= 2010 in Japanese television =

List of years in Japanese television
- … 2000; 2001; 2002; 2003; 2004; 2005; 2006; 2007; 2008; 2009; 2010; 2011; 2012; 2013; 2014; 2015; 2016; 2017; 2018; 2019; 2020 …
- Art; Archaeology; Architecture; Literature; Music; Philosophy; Science; +...

Events in 2010 in Japanese television.

== Events ==
- September 24: Analog television broadcasts shut down in the towns of Suzu and Noto in Ishikawa Prefecture.

== Debuts ==
Show	Station	Premiere Date	Genre	Original Run
Asu no Hikari o Tsukame	Tokai TV	July 5, 2010	Drama	July 5, 2010 – September 2, 2011
HeartCatch PreCure!	ABC TV	February 7, 2010	Anime	February 7, 2010 – January 30, 2011
Tensou Sentai Goseiger	TV Asahi	February 14, 2010	Tokusatsu	February 14, 2010 - February 6, 2011
GeGeGe no Nyōbō	NHK	March 29, 2010	Asadora	March 29 – September 25, 2010
Jewelpet Twinkle	TV Tokyo	April 3, 2010	Anime	April 3, 2010 – April 2, 2011
Beyblade: Metal Masters	TV Tokyo	April 4, 2010	Anime	April 4, 2010 – March 27, 2011
Hime Chen! Otogi Chikku Idol Lilpri	TV Tokyo	April 4, 2010	Anime	April 4, 2010 – March 27, 2011
Shimajirō Hesoka	TV Setouchi; TV Tokyo	April 5, 2010	Anime/Children's Variety	April 5, 2010 – March 26, 2012
Mother	NTV	April 14, 2010	Drama	April 14 – June 23, 2010
Sunao ni Narenakute	Fuji TV	April 15, 2010	Drama	April 15 – June 24, 2010
Gold	Fuji TV	July 8, 2010	Drama	July 8 – September 16, 2010
Kamen Rider OOO	TV Asahi	September 5, 2010	Tokusatsu	September 5, 2010 – August 28, 2011
Pokémon: Best Wishes	TV Tokyo	September 23, 2010	Anime	September 23, 2010 - September 26, 2013

== Ongoing ==
- Music Fair, music (1964–present)
- Mito Kōmon, jidaigeki (1969-2011)
- Sazae-san, anime (1969–present)
- FNS Music Festival, music (1974–present)
- Panel Quiz Attack 25, game show (1975–present)
- Soreike! Anpanman. anime (1988–present)
- Downtown no Gaki no Tsukai ya Arahende!!, game show (1989–present)
- Crayon Shin-chan, anime (1992–present)
- Nintama Rantarō, anime (1993–present)
- Chibi Maruko-chan, anime (1995–present)
- Detective Conan, anime (1996–present)
- SASUKE, sports (1997–present)
- Ojarumaru, anime (1998–present)
- One Piece, anime (1999–present)
- Sgt. Frog, anime (2004-2011)
- Bleach, anime (2004-2012)
- Doraemon, anime (2005–present)
- Naruto Shippuden, anime (2007–2017)
- Kitty's Paradise peace, children's variety (2008-2011)
- Yu-Gi-Oh! 5D's, anime (2008-2011)
- Dragon Ball Kai, anime (2009-2011)
- Tamagotchi!, anime (2009-2012)
- Fairy Tail, anime (2009-2013)

== Endings ==
Show	Station	Ending Date	Genre	Original Run
Fresh Pretty Cure!	ABC TV	January 31, 2010	anime	February 1, 2009 – January 31, 2010
Samurai Sentai Shinkenger	TV Asahi	February 7, 2010	tokusatsu	February 15, 2009 – February 7, 2010
Gintama	TV Tokyo	March 25, 2010	anime	April 4, 2006 – March 25, 2010
Jewelpet	TV Tokyo	March 28, 2010	anime	April 5, 2009 – March 28, 2010
Hakken Taiken Daisuki! Shimajirō	TV Setouchi	March 29, 2010	anime/children's variety	April 7, 2008 – March 29, 2010
Fullmetal Alchemist: Brotherhood	JNN	July 4, 2010	anime	April 5, 2009 – July 4, 2010
Sunao ni Narenakute	Fuji TV	June 24, 2010	drama	April 15 – June 24, 2010
Kamen Rider W	TV Asahi	August 29, 2010	tokusatsu	September 6, 2009 – August 29, 2010
Pokémon: Diamond and Pearl	TV Tokyo	September 9, 2010	anime	September 28, 2006 – September 9, 2010
Gold	Fuji TV	September 16, 2010	drama	July 8 – September 16, 2010

== Deaths ==
Date	Name	Age	Notability	Source
January 17	Daisuke Gōri	57	Japanese voice actor, narrator, and actor for Aoni Production from Kōtō, Tokyo. Death ruled as a suicide by wrist cutting.	

== See also ==
- 2010 in anime
- 2010 Japanese television dramas
- 2010 in Japan
- 2010 in Japanese music
- List of Japanese films of 2010
