= 2012 in Japanese television =

List of years in Japanese television
- … 2002; 2003; 2004; 2005; 2006; 2007; 2008; 2009; 2010; 2011; 2012; 2013; 2014; 2015; 2016; 2017; 2018; 2019; 2020; 2021; 2022 …
- Art; Archaeology; Architecture; Literature; Music; Philosophy; Science; +...

Events in 2012 in Japanese television.

== Events ==
March

Date	Event
31	Analog television ceases broadcasting in the prefectures of Iwate, Miyagi, and Fukushima at 12:00 JST. The analog shutdown was postponed from its original date of July 24, 2011 due to the 2011 Tohoku earthquake and its related nuclear accidents.

== Debuts ==
Show	Station	Premiere Date	Type	Original run
Aikatsu!	TV Tokyo	October 8	Anime	2012-2016
Another	Tokyo MX	January 10	Anime	2012
Aoi Sekai no Chūshin de	Tokyo MX	October 20	Anime	2012-2013
Black Rock Shooter	Fuji TV	February	Anime	2012
Gokujo. Gokurakuin Joshi Kōryō Monogatari	Chukyo TV	January 23	Anime	2012
Honjitsu wa Taian Nari	NHK	January 10	Drama	2012
Inu x Boku SS	MBS	January 12	Anime	2012
Jewelpet Kira Deco!	TV Tokyo	April 7	Anime	2012-2013
JoJo's Bizarre Adventure: The Animation	Tokyo MX	October 5	Anime	2012-2013
Kamen Rider Wizard	TV Asahi	September 2	Tokusatsu	2012-2013
Monsuno	TV Tokyo	October 3	Anime	2012-2013
Mōretsu Pirates	Tokyo MX	January 8	Anime	2012
Poyopoyo Kansatsu Nikki	TV Tokyo	January 8	Anime	2012
Pretty Rhythm: Dear My Future	TV Tokyo	April 7	Anime	2012-2013
Rinne no Lagrange	ytv	January 8	Anime	2012
Saki Achiga-hen Episode of Side-A	TV Tokyo	April 9	Anime	2012
Senhime Zesshō Symphogear	Tokyo MX	January 6	Anime	2012
Shimajirō no Wow!	TV Setouchi; TV Tokyo	April 2	Anime/Children's variety	2012-present
Shokuzai	WOWOW	January	Drama	2012
Smile PreCure!	ABC TV	February 5	Anime	2012-2013
Sword Art Online	Tokyo MX	July 7	Anime	2012
Taira no Kiyomori	NHK	January	Drama	2012
Tamagotchi! Yume Kira Dream	TV Tokyo	September 10	Anime	2012-2013
Tokumei Sentai Go-Busters	TV Asahi	February 26	Tokusatsu	2012–2013
Zetman	ytv	April 2	Anime	2012
Kuroko no Basuke	BS11	April 7	Anime	2012
Sprout	NTV	July 7	Drama	2012
K	MBS	October 5	Anime	2012
Yu-Gi-Oh! ZEXAL II	TV Tokyo	October 7	anime	2012-2014

== Ongoing ==
- Music Fair, music (1964–present)
- Sazae-san, anime (1969–present)
- FNS Music Festival, music (1974–present)
- Panel Quiz Attack 25, game show (1975–present)
- Soreike! Anpanman. anime (1988–present)
- Downtown no Gaki no Tsukai ya Arahende!!, game show (1989–present)
- Crayon Shin-chan, anime (1992–present)
- Nintama Rantarō, anime (1993–present)
- Chibi Maruko-chan, anime (1995–present)
- Detective Conan, anime (1996–present)
- SASUKE, sports (1997–present)
- Ojarumaru, anime (1998–present)
- One Piece, anime (1999–present)
- Doraemon, anime (2005–present)
- Naruto Shippuden, anime (2007–present)
- Fairy Tail, anime (2009-2013)
- Toriko, anime (2011-2014)
- Hunter × Hunter, anime (2011-2014)

== Resuming ==
Show	Station	Resume Date	Type	Original run
Sasuke (TV series)	Tokyo Broadcasting System	December 27	Athletic Competition	1997-

== Endings ==
Show	Station	Ending Date	Type	Original run
Shimajirō Hesoka	TV Setouchi	March 26	anime	April 5, 2010 - March 26, 2012
Bleach	TV Tokyo	March 27	anime	October 5, 2004 - March 27, 2012
Tamagotchi!	TV Tokyo	September 3	anime	October 12, 2009 - September 3, 2012
Suite PreCure	ABC TV	February 6	anime	February 6, 2011 - January 29, 2012
Jewelpet Sunshine	TV Tokyo	March 31	anime	April 9, 2011 - March 31, 2012
Pretty Rhythm: Aurora Dream	TV Tokyo	March 31	anime	April 9, 2011 - March 31, 2012
Yu-Gi-Oh! Zexal	TV Tokyo	September 24	anime	April 11, 2011 – September 24, 2012

== Technology ==
- March 31 – Terrestrial analog television is abandoned at Iwate, Miyagi and Fukushima.

== See also ==
- 2012 in anime
- 2012 Japanese television dramas
- 2012 in Japan
- 2012 in Japanese music
- List of Japanese films of 2012
