= 2013 in Japanese television =

List of years in Japanese television
- … 2003; 2004; 2005; 2006; 2007; 2008; 2009; 2010; 2011; 2012; 2013; 2014; 2015; 2016; 2017; 2018; 2019; 2020; 2021; 2022; 2023 …
- Art; Archaeology; Architecture; Literature; Music; Philosophy; Science; +...

Events in 2013 in Japanese television.

== Channels ==
Closures:

- March 31 - Universal Channel

== Debuts ==
Show	Station	Premiere Date	Type	Original run
Yae's Sakura	NHK	January 6	Taiga Drama	2013
Amachan	NHK	April 1	Asadora	2013
Daiya no A	TV Tokyo	October 6	Anime	2013–2016
Da Capo III	MBS, Tokyo MX	January 5	Anime	2013
DokiDoki! PreCure	ABC TV	February 3	Anime	2013–2014
Hakkenden: Tōhō Hakken Ibun	MBS, Tokyo MX	January 5	Anime	2013
Jewelpet Happiness	TV Tokyo	April 6	Anime	2013–2014
Hakuba no Ōji-sama Junai Tekireiki	NTV, Yomiuri TV	October 3	Drama	2013
Meganebu!	Tokyo MX	October 6	Anime	2013
Sasami-san@Ganbaranai	TBS, BS-TBS	January 11	Anime	2013
Neo Ultra Q	WOWOW	January 12	Tokusatsu	2013
Tamagotchi! Miracle Friends	TV Tokyo	September 5	Anime	2013–2014
Takeda Tetsuya no Shōwa wa kagayaiteita	BS Japan			2013 onwards
Zyuden Sentai Kyoryuger	TV Asahi	February 17	Tokusatsu	2013–2014
Ultraman Ginga	TV Tokyo	July 10	Tokusatsu	2013
AKB48 Show!	BS Premium	October 5	Variety	2013-
Kamen Rider Gaim	TV Asahi	October 6	Tokusatsu	2013–2014
Pocket Monsters XY	TV Tokyo	October 17	Anime	2013–2016

== Ongoing ==
- Music Fair, music (1964–present)
- Sazae-san, anime (1969–present)
- FNS Music Festival, music (1974–present)
- Panel Quiz Attack 25, game show (1975–present)
- Soreike! Anpanman. anime (1988–present)
- Downtown no Gaki no Tsukai ya Arahende!!, game show (1989–present)
- Crayon Shin-chan, anime (1992–present)
- Nintama Rantarō, anime (1993–present)
- Chibi Maruko-chan, anime (1995–present)
- Detective Conan, anime (1996–present)
- SASUKE, sports (1997–present)
- Ojarumaru, anime (1998–present)
- One Piece, anime (1999–present)
- Doraemon, anime (2005–present)
- Naruto Shippuden, anime (2007–2017)
- Toriko, anime (2011-2014)
- Hunter × Hunter, anime (2011-2014)
- Shimajirō no Wow!, anime/children's variety (2012-present)
- Yu-Gi-Oh! ZEXAL II, anime (2012-2014)
- Aikatsu!, anime (2012-2016)

== Ending ==
- Smile PreCure!, anime (2012-2013)
- JoJo's Bizarre Adventure: The Animation, anime (2012-2013)
- Jewelpet Kira Deco!, anime (2012-2013)
- Pretty Rhythm: Dear My Future, anime (2012-2013)
- Tamagotchi! Yume Kira Dream, anime (2012-2013)
- Pocket Monsters Best Wishes, anime (2010-2013)

== Returning ==
Show	Station	Returning Date	Type	Original run
Hajime no Ippo: Rising	NTV	October 5	Anime	2013-2014
Kuroko no Basuke (Season 2)	BS11, Mainichi Broadcasting System	October 5	Anime	2013-2014

== See also ==
- 2013 in anime
- 2013 Japanese television dramas
- 2013 in Japan
- 2013 in Japanese music
- List of Japanese films of 2013
