= 14th Yokohama Film Festival =

1993 film festival in Yokohama, Japan

- Location: Kannai Hall, Yokohama, Kanagawa, Japan
- Founded: 1980
- Festival date: 7 February 1993

The 14th Yokohama Film Festival (第14回ヨコハマ映画祭) was held on 7 February 1993 in Kannai Hall, Yokohama, Kanagawa, Japan.

== Awards ==
- Best Film: Sumo Do, Sumo Don't
- Best New Actor:
  - Etsushi Toyokawa – The Gentle 12, Kira Kira Hikaru, Kachō Shima Kōsaku
  - Yoshiyuki Ōmori – Wangan Bad Boy Blue, The Rocking Horsemen, The Strange Tale of Oyuki
- Best Actor: Masahiro Motoki – Sumo Do, Sumo Don't
- Best Actress: Yōko Minamino – Kantsubaki, Hold Me and Kiss Me
- Best New Actress: Yuki Sumida – The Strange Tale of Oyuki
- Best Supporting Actor: Hideo Murota – Original Sin
- Best Supporting Actress:
  - Keiko Oginome – The Triple Cross
  - Misa Shimizu – Sumo Do, Sumo Don't, Future Memories: Last Christmas, Okoge
- Best Director: Masayuki Suo – Sumo Do, Sumo Don't
- Best New Director:
  - Katsuya Matsumura – All Night Long
  - Tadafumi Tomioka – Wangan Bad Boy Blue
- Best Screenplay: Masayuki Suo – Sumo Do, Sumo Don't
- Best Cinematography: Yasushi Sasakibara – Wangan Bad Boy Blue, Original Sin
- Special Prize: Kinji Fukasaku (Career)

== Best 10 ==
1. Sumo Do, Sumo Don't
2. The Triple Cross
3. The Rocking Horsemen
4. Original Sin
5. Kira Kira Hikaru
6. Sosuke Loses His Love
7. The Games Teachers Play
8. The Gentle 12
9. Wangan Bad Boy Blue
10. Arifureta Ai ni Kansuru Chōsa

runner-up: Pineapple Tours
