= 1992 in Japanese television =

List of years in Japanese television
- … 1982; 1983; 1984; 1985; 1986; 1987; 1988; 1989; 1990; 1991; 1992; 1993; 1994; 1995; 1996; 1997; 1998; 1999; 2000; 2001; 2002 …
- Art; Archaeology; Architecture; Literature; Music; Philosophy; Science; +...

Events in 1992 in Japanese television.

== Debuts ==
Show	Station	Premiere date	Genre	Original run
The Brave Fighter of Legend Da-Garn	Nagoya TV	February 8	Anime	February 8, 1992 – January 23, 1993
Cooking Papa	TV Asahi	April 9	Anime	April 9, 1992 – May 25, 1995
Crayon Shin-chan	TV Asahi	April 13	Anime	April 13, 1992 - present
The Girl in the Wind: Jeanie with the Light Brown Hair	TV Tokyo	October 15	Anime	October 15, 1992 – September 30, 1993
Kyōryū Sentai Zyuranger	TV Asahi	February 21	Tokusatsu	February 21, 1992 – February 12, 1993
Sono toki Heartwa Nusumareta	Fuji TV	November 19	Drama	November 19, 1992 – December 17, 1992
Space Knight Tekkaman Blade	TV Tokyo	February 18	Anime	February 18, 1992 - February 2, 1993
The Girl in the Wind: Jeanie with the Light Brown Hair	TV Tokyo	February 18	Anime	February 18, 1992 – February 2, 1993
Tokusou Exceedraft	TV Asahi	February 2	Tokusatsu	February 2, 1992 – January 24, 1993
Sailor Moon	TV Asahi	March 7	anime	March 7, 1992 – February 8, 1997
YuYu Hakusho	Fuji TV	October 10	Anime	October 10, 1992 - January 7, 1995

== Ongoing shows ==
- Music Fair, music (1964–present)
- Mito Kōmon, jidaigeki (1969-2011)
- Sazae-san, anime (1969–present)
- Ōoka Echizen, jidaigeki (1970-1999)
- FNS Music Festival, music (1974-present)
- Panel Quiz Attack 25, game show (1975–present)
- Doraemon, anime (1979-2005)
- Kiteretsu Daihyakka, anime (1988-1996)
- Soreike! Anpanman, anime (1988-present)
- Dragon Ball Z, anime (1989–1996)
- Downtown no Gaki no Tsukai ya Arahende!!, game show (1989–present)

== Endings ==
Show	Station	Ending date	Genre	Original run
Chibi Maruko-chan	Fuji TV	September 27	Anime	January 7, 1990 – September 27, 1992
Chōjin Sentai Jetman	TV Asahi	February 14	Tokusatsu	February 15, 1991 – February 14, 1992
Dragon Quest: The Adventure of Dai	TBS	September 24	Anime	October 17, 1991 – September 24, 1992
Ranma ½ Nettohen	Fuji TV	September 25	Anime	October 20, 1989 – September 25, 1992
The Brave Fighter of Sun Fighbird	Nagoya TV	February 1	Anime	February 2, 1991 – February 1, 1992
Tokkyuu Shirei Solbrain	TV Asahi	January 26	Tokusatsu	January 20, 1991 – January 26, 1992
YAWARA! a fashionable judo girl	Yomiuri TV	September 21	Anime	October 16, 1989 – September 21, 1992

== See also ==
- 1992 in anime
- List of Japanese television dramas
- 1992 in Japan
- List of Japanese films of 1992
