= 1991 in Japanese television =

List of years in Japanese television
- … 1981; 1982; 1983; 1984; 1985; 1986; 1987; 1988; 1989; 1990; 1991; 1992; 1993; 1994; 1995; 1996; 1997; 1998; 1999; 2000; 2001 …
- Art; Archaeology; Architecture; Literature; Music; Philosophy; Science; +...

Events in 1991 in Japanese television.

== Channels ==
Launches:

- April 1 - Kids Station

== Debuts ==
Show	Station	Premiere Date	Genre	Original Run
Chojin Sentai Jetman	TV Asahi	February 15	tokusatsu	February 15, 1991 – February 14, 1992
City Hunter '91	Nippon TV	April 28	anime	April 28, 1991 – October 10, 1991
Dragon Quest: The Adventure of Dai	TBS	October 17	anime	October 17, 1991 – September 24, 1992
Future GPX Cyber Formula	Nippon TV	March 15	anime	March 15, 1991 – December 20, 1991
Tokkyuu Shirei Solbrain	TV Asahi	January 20	tokusatsu	January 20, 1991 – January 26, 1992
The Brave Fighter of Sun Fighbird	Nagoya TV	February 2	anime	February 2, 1991 – February 1, 1992

== Ongoing shows ==
- Music Fair, music (1964–present)
- Mito Kōmon, jidaigeki (1969-2011)
- Sazae-san, anime (1969–present)
- Ōoka Echizen, jidaigeki (1970-1999)
- FNS Music Festival, music (1974–present)
- Panel Quiz Attack 25, game show (1975–present)
- Doraemon, anime (1979-2005)
- Kiteretsu Daihyakka, anime (1988-1996)
- Soreike! Anpanman, anime (1988–present)
- YAWARA! a fashionable judo girl, anime (1989-1992)
- Ranma ½ Nettohen, anime (1989−1992)
- Dragon Ball Z, anime (1989-1996)
- Downtown no Gaki no Tsukai ya Arahende!!, game show (1989–present)
- Chibi Maruko-chan, anime (1990-1992)
- Magical Taruruto-kun, anime (1990-1992)

== Resuming ==
Show	Station	Resuming Date	Genre	Original Run
Dragon Quest	Fuji TV	January 11	anime	January 11, 1991 – April 5, 1991

== Endings ==
Show	Station	Ending Date	Genre	Original Run
Brave Exkaiser	Nagoya TV	January 26	anime	February 3, 1990 – January 26, 1991
Chikyuu Sentai Fiveman	TV Asahi	February 8	tokusatsu	March 2, 1990 – February 8, 1991
City Hunter '91	Nippon TV	October 10	anime	April 28, 1991 – October 10, 1991
Special Rescue Police Winspector	TV Asahi	January, 13	tokusatsu	February 4, 1990 - January 13, 1991
Mashin Hero Wataru 2	Nippon TV	March 8	anime	March 3, 1990 – March 8, 1991
Delightful Moomin Family	TV Tokyo	October 3	anime	April 12, 1990 – October 3, 1991
Nadia: The Secret of Blue Water	NHK	April 12	anime	April 13, 1990 - April 12, 1991
NG Knight Ramune & 40	TV Tokyo	January 4	anime	April 6, 1990 – January 4, 1991
Dragon Quest	Fuji TV	April 5	anime	January 11, 1991 – April 5, 1991
Idol Angel Yokoso Yoko	TV Tokyo	February 4	anime	April 2, 1990 – February 4, 1991
Kyatto Ninden Teyandee	TV Tokyo	February 12	anime	February 1, 1990 - February 12, 1991
Magical Angel Sweet Mint	TV Tokyo	March 27	anime	May 2, 1990 – March 27, 1991
Future GPX Cyber Formula	Nippon TV	December 20	anime	March 15, 1991 – December 20, 1991

== See also ==
- 1991 in anime
- List of Japanese television dramas
- 1991 in Japan
- List of Japanese films of 1991
