= List of Japanese films of 1992 =

A list of films released in Japan in 1992 (see 1992 in film).

Title	Director	Cast	Genre	Notes
1992
Dragon Ball Z: Return of Cooler	Daisuke Nishio		Science fiction Martial arts	
Dragon Ball Z: Super Android 13!				
Future Memories: Last Christmas	Yoshimitsu Morita	Misa Shimizu		
Godzilla vs. Mothra			Kaiju	First Heisei era Mothra film.
The Guard from Underground	Kiyoshi Kurosawa	Hatsunori Hasegawa, Makiko Kuno, Ren Osugi	Horror	
Luminous Moss	Kei Kumai			Entered into the 42nd Berlin International Film Festival
Midori				Edited following its premiere to remove imagery that was considered illegal at the time; roughly six minutes of this footage remains lost
Minbo	Juzo Itami	Nobuko Miyamoto, Yasuo Daichi		
Oira Sukeban: Kessen! Pansutō	Teruyoshi Ishii			Based on a manga
Original Sin	Takashi Ishii	Shinobu Otake, Masatoshi Nagase		
Porco Rosso	Hayao Miyazaki		Fantasy, Anime	
Ramayana: The Legend of Prince Rama	Yugo Sako			
The Setting Sun	Rou Tomono	Masaya Kato, Diane Lane		
Sumo Do, Sumo Don't	Masayuki Suo	Masahiro Motoki; Misa Shimizu; Naoto Takenaka		Japan Academy Prize for Best Film
Talking Head	Mamoru Oshii			
Tetsuo II: Body Hammer	Shinya Tsukamoto		Horror	
Tora-San Makes Excuses	Yoji Yamada	Kiyoshi Atsumi	Comedy	45th in the Otoko wa Tsurai yo series

== See also ==
- 1992 in Japan
- 1992 in Japanese television
