= List of Japanese films =

The following are lists of films produced in Japan.

== Before 1950 ==
- List of Japanese films before 1910
- List of Japanese films of the 1910s
- List of Japanese films of the 1920s
- List of Japanese films of the 1930s
- List of Japanese films of the 1940s

== 1950–1999 ==
- 1950
- 1951
- 1952
- 1953
- 1954
- 1955
- 1956
- 1957
- 1958
- 1959
- 1960
- 1961
- 1962
- 1963
- 1964
- 1965
- 1966
- 1967
- 1968
- 1969
- 1970
- 1971
- 1972
- 1973
- 1974
- 1975
- 1976
- 1977
- 1978
- 1979
- 1980
- 1981
- 1982
- 1983
- 1984
- 1985
- 1986
- 1987
- 1988
- 1989
- 1990
- 1991
- 1992
- 1993
- 1994
- 1995
- 1996
- 1997
- 1998
- 1999

== 21st century ==
- 2000
- 2001
- 2002
- 2003
- 2004
- 2005
- 2006
- 2007
- 2008
- 2009
- 2010
- 2011
- 2012
- 2013
- 2014
- 2015
- 2016
- 2017
- 2018
- 2019
- 2020
- 2021
- 2022
- 2023
- 2024
- 2025
- 2026
- 2027

== See also ==
- Cinema of Japan
- Category:Japanese films
- List of highest-grossing films in Japan
- List of highest-grossing Japanese films
