= 1990 in Japanese television =

| List of years in Japanese television |
- … 1980; 1981; 1982; 1983; 1984; 1985; 1986; 1987; 1988; 1989; 1990; 1991; 1992; 1993; 1994; 1995; 1996; 1997; 1998; 1999; 2000 …
- Art; Archaeology; Architecture; Literature; Music; Philosophy; Science; +...

Events in 1990 in Japanese television.

== Debuts ==
| Show | Station | Premiere date | Genre | Original run |
|---|---|---|---|---|
| Brave Exkaiser | Nagoya TV | February 3 | Anime | February 3, 1990 – January 26, 1991 |
| Chibi Maruko-chan | Fuji TV | January 7 | Anime | January 7, 1990 – September 27, 1992 |
| Chikyuu Sentai Fiveman | TV Asahi | March 2 | Tokusatsu | March 2, 1990 – February 8, 1991 |
| Idol Angel Yokoso Yoko | TV Setouchi | April 2 | Anime | April 2, 1990 – February 4, 1991 |
| Karasu Tengu Kabuto | NHK | July 29 | Anime | July 29, 1990 – June 30, 1991 |
| Kyatto Ninden Teyandee | TV Tokyo | February 1 | Anime | February 1, 1990 – February 12, 1991 |
| Magical Angel Sweet Mint | TV Tokyo | May 2 | Anime | May 2, 1990 – March 27, 1991 |
| Mashin Hero Wataru 2 | Nippon TV | March 3 | Anime | March 3, 1990 – March 8, 1991 |
| My Daddy Long Legs | Fuji TV | January 13 | Anime | January 13, 1990 – December 22, 1990 |
| Nadia: The Secret of Blue Water | NHK | April 13 | Anime | April 13, 1990 – April 12, 1991 |
| NG Knight Ramune & 40 | TV Tokyo | April 6 | Anime | April 6, 1990 – January 4, 1991 |
| Robin Hood no Daibōken | NHK | July 29 | Anime | July 29, 1990 – June 30, 1991 |
| Sunset on Third Street | TBS | October 12 | Tokusatsu | October 12, 1990 – March 22, 1991 |
| Tanoshii Moomin Ikka | TV Tokyo | April 12 | Anime | April 12, 1990 – October 3, 1991 |
| Tokkei Winspector | TV Asahi | February 4 | Tokusatsu | February 4, 1990 – January 13, 1991 |

== Ongoing shows ==
- Music Fair, music (1964–present)
- Mito Kōmon, jidaigeki (1969–2011)
- Sazae-san, anime (1969–present)
- Ōoka Echizen, jidaigeki (1970–1999)
- FNS Music Festival, music (1974–present)
- Panel Quiz Attack 25, game show (1975–present)
- Doraemon, anime (1979–2005)
- Kiteretsu Daihyakka, anime (1988–1996)
- Soreike! Anpanman, anime (1988–present)
- YAWARA! a fashionable judo girl, anime (1989–1992)
- Ranma ½ Nettohen, anime (1989−1992)
- Dragon Ball Z, anime (1989–1996)
- Downtown no Gaki no Tsukai ya Arahende!!, game show (1989–present)

== Hiatus ==
| Show | Station | Hiatus date | Genre | Original run |
|---|---|---|---|---|
| Dragon Quest | Fuji TV | September 22 | Anime | December 2, 1989 – September 22, 1990 |

== Endings ==
| Show | Station | End date | Genre | Original run |
|---|---|---|---|---|
| City Hunter 3 | Yomiuri TV | January 21 | Anime | October 15, 1989 – January 21, 1990 |
| Dragon Quest | Fuji TV | September 22 | Anime | December 2, 1989 – September 22, 1990 |
| Idol Densetsu Eriko | TV Setouchi | March 26 | Anime | April 3, 1989 – March 26, 1990 |
| Jungle Emperor | TV Tokyo | October 11 | Tokusatsu | October 12, 1989 – October 11, 1990 |
| Kidou Keiji Jiban | TV Asahi | January 28 | Tokusatsu | January 29, 1989 – January 28, 1990 |
| Kousoku Sentai Turboranger | TV Asahi | February 23 | Tokusatsu | February 25, 1989 – February 23, 1990 |
| Legend of Heavenly Sphere Shurato | TV Tokyo | January 18 | Anime | April 6, 1989 – January 18, 1990 |
| Madö King Granzört | Nippon TV | March 2 | Anime | April 7, 1989 – March 2, 1990 |
| Magical Hat | Fuji TV | July 6 | Anime | October 18, 1989 – July 6, 1990 |
| My Daddy Long Legs | Fuji TV | December 22 | Anime | January 13, 1990 – December 22, 1990 |
| Patlabor: The TV Series | Nippon TV | September 29 | Anime | October 11, 1989 – September 29, 1990 |

== See also ==
- 1990 in anime
- List of Japanese television dramas
- 1990 in Japan
- List of Japanese films of 1990
