= 1982 in Japanese television =

List of years in Japanese television
- … 1972; 1973; 1974; 1975; 1976; 1977; 1978; 1979; 1980; 1981; 1982; 1983; 1984; 1985; 1986; 1987; 1988; 1989; 1990; 1991; 1992 …
- Art; Archaeology; Architecture; Literature; Music; Philosophy; Science; +...

Events in 1982 in Japanese television.

== Debuts ==
- Baxinger, an anime that aired from 1982 to 1983.
- Uchuu Keiji Gavan, a tokusatsu series that aired from 1982 to 1983.
- Cobra, an anime series that ran from 1982 to 1983.
- Combat Mecha Xabungle, an anime series that aired from 1982 to 1983.
- Dai Sentai Goggle-V, a tokusatsu series that aired from 1982 to 1983.
- Gyakuten! Ippatsuman, an anime series that aired from 1982 to 1983.
- Hiatari Ryōkō!, a drama that aired in 1982.
- Kikou Kantai Dairugger XV, an anime series that ran from 1982 to 1983.
- Lucy of the Southern Rainbow (1982).
- The New Adventures of Maya the Honey Bee, an anime series that aired from 1982 to 1983.
- Shadow Warriors III, a drama series from 1982.
- Tōge no Gunzō, a Taiga drama that aired in 1982.
- Tokimeki Tonight, an anime series that ran from 1982 to 1983.
- Super Dimension Fortress Macross, an anime series that aired from 1982 to 1983.

== Ongoing ==
- Music Fair, a music show that has been running since 1964.
- Mito Kōmon, a jidaigeki series that ran from 1969 to 2011.
- Sazae-san, an anime series that has been ongoing since 1969.
- Ōedo Sōsamō, an anime series that ran from 1970 to 1984.
- Ōoka Echizen, a jidaigeki series that ran from 1970 to 1999.
- Star Tanjō!, a talent show that ran from 1971 to 1983.
- FNS Music Festival, a music show that has been running since 1974.
- Panel Quiz Attack 25, a game show that has been running since 1975.
- Doraemon, an anime series that ran from 1979 to 2005.
- Dr. Slump - Arale-chan, an anime series that ran from 1981 to 1986.
- Urusei Yatsura, an anime series that ran from 1981 to 1986.

== Endings ==
- Beast King GoLion, an anime that concluded in 1982.
- Braiger, an anime that concluded in 1982.
- Fisherman Sanpei, an anime that concluded in 1982.
- G–Men '75, a drama series that concluded in 1982.
- Golden Warrior Gold Lightan, an anime that concluded in 1982.
- Hello! Sandybell, an anime that concluded in 1982.
- Hiatari Ryōkō!, a drama series that concluded in 1982.
- Shadow Warriors II, a drama series that concluded in 1982.
- Shadow Warriors III, a drama series from 1982.
- Superbook, an anime that concluded in 1982.
- Taiyo Sentai Sun Vulcan, a tokusatsu series that concluded in 1982.
- Tōge no Gunsō, a Taiga drama that concluded in 1982.
- Yattodetaman, an anime that concluded in 1982.

== See also ==
- 1982 in anime
- List of Japanese television dramas
- 1982 in Japan
- List of Japanese films of 1982
