= Okoge =

Okoge may refer to:

- Okoge (food)
- Okoge (film), a 1992 gay-themed Japanese film
- Okoge (御焦げ), a Japanese slang term meaning fag hag
