= Okoge (film) =

- Original theatrical release poster
- Directed by: Takehiro Nakajima
- Written by: Takehiro Nakajima
- Produced by: Yoshinori Takazawa; Masafumi Moromisato
- Starring: Misa Shimizu; Takehiro Murata; Takeo Nakahara
- Cinematography: Yoshimasa Hakata
- Edited by: Hikoji Goto
- Music by: Edison
- Distributed by: Tokyo Theatre Company
- Release dates: October 10, 1992 (Japan); April 2, 1993 (United States)
- Running time: 120 minutes
- Country: Japan
- Language: Japanese

Okoge (おこげ; lit. 'Fag Hag') is a gay-themed Japanese comedy drama film written and directed by Takehiro Nakajima, theatrically released on October 10, 1992, in Japan. The film was also screened at the 2nd Tokyo International Lesbian & Gay Film Festival. Its title comes from Japanese slang for a woman who prefers the company of gay men; okama (おかま or オカマ, cooking pot) is used as a slang reference for gay men, and by analogy okoge (おこげ, burnt rice), rice that sticks to a cooking pot during cooking, is used to refer to their female friends.

== Premise ==
Due to a mix-up, Sayoko, an anime voice actress, ends up on an LGBT+ beach. There she meets Goh and Tochi, a gay couple who, despite Tochi's sham marriage, are very much in love. The three bond quickly. Later, Goh's apartment becomes crowded when his mother moves in after a fight with a relative. Sayoko offers a spare room to the displaced couple. Soon an unorthodox family unit forms in Sayoko's flat, until Tochi's wife discovers her husband's secret.

== Cast ==
Actor	Role
Misa Shimizu	Sayoko Morohashi
Takehiro Murata	Goh Yoshino
Takeo Nakahara	“Tochi”, Tochihiko Terazaki
Atsushi Fukazawa	Tamio
Takatoshi Takeda	Tsuyuki, Gay Bar Bartender
Masayuki Shionoya	Genji Kurihara
Kyōzō Nagatsuka	Toichi Yoshino, Goh's Brother
Mitsuko Oka	Tokuko, Toichi's Wife
Michiyo Yokoyama	Manami
Noriko Sengoku	Kinoe Yoshino, Goh's Mother
Toshie Negishi	Yayoi Terasaki, Tochi's Wife
Charles Garfield	Sayoko's Stepfather
Yoshiko Kuga	Women's Clothing Store Manager
Dump Matsumoto	Izakaya Guest
Toshinori Omi	Nirakawa
Casey Takamine	Kojima's Father
Guts Ishimatsu	Sayoko's Second Adoptive Father
Eriko Watanabe	Sayoko's Second Adoptive Mother
Midori Kiuchi	Older Voice Actress
Hairi Katagiri	Colleague Voice Actress
Michio Kida	Komo-san
Asako Mori	
Yoko Okawa	Miyoko Kojima
Shô Ryûzanji	
Yumenosuke Sanshoutei	Host of Nirakawa's Wedding Reception
Michino Yokoyama	Manami
Kayano Komaki	
Yasufumi Hayashi	
Bunmei Tobayama	

== Awards and nominations ==
17th Hochi Film Awards

- Won: Best Actress (Misa Shimizu, also won for Sumo Do, Sumo Don't and Future Memories: Last Christmas)
- Won: Best Supporting Actor (Takehiro Murata, also won for Minbo)

66th Kinema Junpo Best Ten Awards

- Won: Best Supporting Actor (Takehiro Murata)

47th Mainichi Film Awards

- Won: Best Supporting Actor (Takehiro Murata, also won for Minbo)

5th Nikkan Sports Film Awards

- Won: Best Newcomer (Misa Shimizu)
- Won: Best Supporting Actor (Takehiro Murata)

14th Yokohama Film Festival Awards

- Won: Best Actress (Misa Shimizu, shared with Keiko Oginome)

16th Japan Academy Awards

- Nominated: Best Supporting Actor (Takehiro Murata)

== See also ==
- List of lesbian, gay, bisexual or transgender-related films
- Tokyo International Lesbian & Gay Film Festival
