= List of Japanese films of 2001 =

== Highest-grossing films ==
Rank	Title	Gross
1	Spirited Away	¥30.4 billion
2	Pokémon 4Ever	¥3.90 billion
3	Battle Royale	¥3.11 billion
4	Onmyōji	¥3.01billion
5	Doraemon: Nobita and the Winged Braves	¥3.00 billion

== List of films ==
A list of films released in Japan in 2001 (see 2001 in film).

Japanese films released in 2001
Title	Director	Cast	Genre	Notes
Akumyō				
Akumyō 2: Araburu Kenkadamashī				
All About Lily Chou-Chou	Shunji Iwai	Hayato Ichihara	Drama	
Apartment Wife: Moans from Next Door	Toshiki Satō	Mao Nakagawa; Tsukasa Saitō	Pink	Best Film, Pink Grand Prix
Avalon	Mamoru Oshii		Science fiction	Screened at the 2001 Cannes Film Festival
Blue	Hiroshi Ando		Drama	Entered into the 24th Moscow International Film Festival
Crayon Shin-chan: The Adult Empire Strikes Back				
Desert Moon	Shinji Aoyama		Drama	Entered into the 2001 Cannes Film Festival
Detective Conan: Countdown to Heaven				
Distance	Hirokazu Koreeda			Entered into the 2001 Cannes Film Festival
Gaoranger: Fire Mountain Howls			Tokusatsu	Shown on a double bill with Kamen Rider Agito: Project G4
Gaoranger vs. Super Sentai			Tokusatsu	V-Cinema
Go				
Godzilla, Mothra & King Ghidorah: Giant Monsters All-Out Attack	Shusuke Kaneko		Kaiju	
Goryokaku			Historical epic	Based on events in the Boshin War of the 1860s
H Story	Nobuhiro Suwa		Drama	Screened at the 2001 Cannes Film Festival
The Happiness of the Katakuris	Takashi Miike	Kenji Sawada, Keiko Matsuzaka, Shinji Takeda	Horror, musical	
Ichi the Killer	Takashi Miike		Crime, Horror	
Inugami	Masato Harada	Yūki Amami, Atsuro Watabe, Eugene Harada	—N/a	
Inuyasha the Movie: Affections Touching Across Time			Fantasy anime	
Kamen Rider Agito: Project G4			Tokusatsu	Shown on a double bill with Gaoranger: Fire Mountain Howls
Kinnikuman Nisei the Movie				
Man Walking on Snow	Masahiro Kobayashi		Drama	Screened at the 2001 Cannes Film Festival
Metropolis	Rintaro		Science fiction Anime	
Millennium Actress	Satoshi Kon		Drama, Anime	
Minna no Ie				
Mourning Wife	Daisuke Gotō	Mayuko Sasaki; Koharu Yamasaki	Pink	Silver Prize, Best Actress, 2nd place and Best Cinematography, Pink Grand Prix
Saiyuki: Requiem - The Motion Picture	Hayato Date	Toshihiko Seki, Sōichirō Hoshi, Hiroaki Hirata, Akira Ishida	Adventure, fantasy	
One Piece the Movie: Clockwork Island Adventure		Mayumi Tanaka, Kazuya Nakai, Akemi Okamura, Kappei Yamaguchi, Hiroaki Hirata		
Onmyoji	Yōjirō Takita	Mansai Nomura	Fantasy, Martial arts	
Pistol Opera	Seijun Suzuki	Makiko Esumi	Crime	
Poketto Monsutā Serebii: The Meeting that Traversed Time	Kunihiko Yuyama		Fantasy Anime	
The Princess Blade	Shinsuke Sato	Yumiko Shaku, Hideaki Itō	Action, Science fiction	
Pulse	Kiyoshi Kurosawa	Kumiko Asō, Haruhiko Kato, Koyuki	J-horror	
Spirited Away	Hayao Miyazaki		Fantasy Anime	Blue Ribbon Award winner Japan Academy Prize for Best Film; Academy Award for Best Animated Feature winner
St. John's Wort	Ten Shimoyama	Megumi Okina, Yoichiro Saito, Koji Okura	J-horror	
Timeranger vs. GoGoV			Tokusatsu	V-Cinema
Tomie: Re-birth	Takashi Shimizu	Miki Sakai	Horror	
Ultraman Cosmos: The First Contact			Tokusatsu	
Warm Water Under a Red Bridge	Shōhei Imamura	Kōji Yakusho; Misa Shimizu; Mitsuko Baisho		Imamura's last feature film, entered into Cannes
Waterboys	Shinobu Yaguchi		Sports comedy	

== See also ==
- 2001 in Japan
- 2001 in Japanese television
