= Takeo Nakahara =

Japanese actor

- 中原 丈雄
- Born: October 19, 1951 (age 74); Kumamoto, Japan
- Occupation: Actor
- Years active: 1989–present
- Agent: Office Sasaki

Takeo Nakahara (中原 丈雄, Nakahara Takeo; born October 19, 1951 in Kumamoto, Japan) is a Japanese actor.

== Filmography ==
=== Film ===
- Okoge (1992) – Tochihiko Terazaki
- Kaettekita Kogarashi Monjirō (1993) - Hachibei
- Godzilla 2000 (1999) – Takada
- Godzilla Against Mechagodzilla (2002) – JXSDF Chief Ichiyanagi
- Bayside Shakedown 2 (2003) – Sakakibara
- Blue Swallow (2005) – The Minister for Foreign Affairs of Japan
- Death Note (2006) – Matsubara
- Map of the Sounds of Tokyo (2009) – Nagara
- Isoroku (2011) – Chūichi Nagumo
- The Floating Castle (2012) – Hōjō Ujimasa
- Cape Nostalgia (2014) – Narumi
- Assassination Classroom (2015) – Gōki Onaga
- Assassination Classroom: Graduation (2016) – Gōki Onaga
- Musashi (2019) – Itakura Katsushige
- Rurouni Kenshin: The Final (2021) – Maekawa Miyauchi
- Familia (2023)
- Voices of Loved One (2024)
- Sasayaki no Kawa (2025)
- Kami no Shima (2025)

=== Television ===
- Taiga drama
  - Homura Tatsu (1993–94) – Fujiwara no Motoaki
  - Tokugawa Yoshinobu (1998) – Umezawa Magotaro
  - Sanada Maru (2016) – Takanashi Naiki
- Asadora
  - Himawari (1996)
  - Dondo Hare (2007) – Hideki Yamamuro
  - Sunshine (2011) – Shotaro Kamikura
  - Hanako and Anne (2014) – Heisuke Muraoka
  - Natsuzora: Natsu's Sky (2019)
  - Chimudondon (2022) – Tomohiro Ino
- The Great White Tower (2003, Fuji TV) – Professor Funao
- Jyouou (2005, TV Tokyo) – Seiji Nakabō
- Bloody Monday (2008, TBS) – Takao Sonoma
- Zettai Reido (2010–11, Fuji TV) – Shintarō Shiraishi
- Nankyoku Tairiku (2011, TBS) – Shinpei Hatano
- Hayami-san to Yobareru Hi (2012, Fuji TV) – Hiroshi Kanai
- Nemuri Kyōshirō The Final (2018, Fuji TV) - Kunen
- Shikatanakatta to Iute wa Ikan no desu (2021, NHK)
