= List of Japanese films of 1990 =

A list of films released in Japan in 1990 (see 1990 in film).

Title	Director	Cast	Genre	Notes
1990
A-Ge-Man: Tales of a Golden Geisha	Juzo Itami	Nobuko Miyamoto, Masahiko Tsugawa, Hiroshi Okochi	Comedy	
Boiling Point	Takeshi Kitano	Beat Kateshi	Thriller	
Childhood Days	Masahiro Shinoda	Yuji Horioka; Tetsuya Fujita	Drama	Japan Academy Prize for Best Film
Chinpui-Eri-sama katudo daisasshin	Mitusro Hongo			Animated film
Dragon Ball Z: The World's Strongest				
Dragon Ball Z: The Tree of Might				
Dreams	Akira Kurosawa	Mitsuko Baisho, Toshihiko Nakano, Akira Terao	Drama, fantasy	
Guinea Pig: Devil Woman Doctor			Horror	
Heaven and Earth	Kadokawa Haruki			aka "Ten to chi to"
Hon Kon paradaisu	Shusuke Kaneko	Yuki Saito, Kaoru Kobayashi, Yoshiyuki Ohsawa	—N/a	
Maroko	Mamoru Oshii	Masako Katsuki, Toshio Furukawa, Kenichi Ogata	Comedy, drama, science fiction	
Graveyard Shift	Ralph S. Singleton	David Andrews, Kelly Wolf, Stephen Macht, Brad Dourif	Horror	
Memphis Belle	Michael Caton-Jones	Matthew Modine, Eric Stoltz, Sean Astin, Harry Connick Jr., Reed Diamond, Tate Donovan, John Lithgow, D. B. Sweeney, Billy Zane, Courtney Gains, Neil Giuntoli, Jane Horrocks, Mac McDonald	War, drama	British-Japanese-American co-production
Mr. Redei-Yoakeno Shinderera	Masaharu Segawa	Tsurutaro Kataoka, Akira Onodera, Mari Yagizawa	Comedy	
Nobita and the Animal Planet	Tsutomu Shibayama, Daikichiro Kusube			
The Rescuers Down Under	Hendel Butoy, Mike Gabriel	Bob Newhart, Eva Gabor, John Candy, Adam Ryen, George C. Scott, Tristan Rogers	Animated adventure	
Reversal of Fortune	Barbet Schroeder	Glenn Close, Jeremy Irons, Ron Silver	Drama	American-Japanese-British co-production
Roar of the Crowd	Yutaka Osawa	Tomokazu Miura, Misako Tanaka, Yasufumi Hayashi	—N/a	
Rōnin-gai				
Saga of the Phoenix				
Shirokumakun, dokoe?	Shinya Sadamitsu		—N/a	
The Sting of Death	Kōhei Oguri			Won two awards at Cannes
Tasmania Story	Yasuo Furuhata	Kunie Tanaka, Hiroko Yakushimaru, Jinpachi Nezu	—N/a	
Tekken	Junji Sakamoto	Takeshi Yamato, Bunta Sugawara	Drama	
Tora-san Takes a Vacation	Yoji Yamada	Kiyoshi Atsumi	Comedy	43rd in the Otoko wa Tsurai yo series
Uchū no hōsoku	Kazuyuki Izutsu	Masato Furuoya		
Ultra Q The Movie: Legend of the Stars	Akio Jissoji	Masami Horiuchi, Hiroshi Tsuburaya	Kaiju	
White Wolf	Yosei Maeda		Animated films	
The Wonderful Galaxy of Oz	Soji Yoshikawa	Mariko Kouda, Ai Sato		
ZIPANG	Kaizo Hayashi	Masahiro Takashima, Narumi Yasuda, Haruko Wanibuchi	Fantasy adventure, comedy	

== See also ==
- 1990 in Japan
- 1990 in Japanese television
