= Future Memories: Last Christmas =

- Film poster

Japanese name
- Kanji: 未来の想い出 Last Christmas
- Kana: みらいのおもいで Last Christmas
Transcriptions
- Revised Hepburn: Mirai no Omoide: Rasuto Kurisumasu
- Directed by: Yoshimitsu Morita
- Screenplay by: Yoshimitsu Morita
- Based on: Mirai no Omoide: Last Christmas by Fujiko F. Fujio
- Produced by: Hikaru Suzuki; Katsuhiko Aoki; Kazuko Misawa; Mitsuyo Fujita
- Starring: Misa Shimizu; Shizuka Kudo; David Ito; Motoya Izumi; Toshiaki Karasawa
- Cinematography: Yonezo Maeda
- Edited by: Akimasa Kawashima
- Music by: Takashi Kako
- Production companies: Kouwa International; Fujiko F. Fujio Production Co., Ltd.
- Distributed by: Toho
- Release date: August 29, 1992 (Japan)
- Running time: 118 minutes
- Country: Japan
- Language: Japanese

Future Memories: Last Christmas (Japanese: 未来の想い出 Last Christmas, Hepburn: Mirai no Omoide: Rasuto Kurisumasu) is a 1992 Japanese fantasy romantic drama film written and directed by Yoshimitsu Morita. It is based on a semi-autobiographical seinen manga by Fujiko F. Fujio, first published in 1991. The film stars Misa Shimizu and Shizuka Kudo in the lead roles, alongside David Ito, Motoya Izumi and Toshiaki Karasawa. Toho released the film on August 29, 1992, in Japan. "Last Christmas" by the English pop duo Wham! serves as the film's theme song.

== Plot ==
Yuko has dreamed her whole life of becoming a bestselling children's book author. She enters the publishing industry in 1981 but struggles to find success. A decade later, on Christmas Day 1991, Yuko despondently finds herself bonding with a woman named Ginko. Ginko used to be an office worker, but a tragic love life and failed marriage have left her selling fortune telling services on the side of the road. The two women bond and swap phone numbers, but tragedy soon befalls them both. Yuko has a heart attack and dies at an office golf outing, while Ginko suffers an accident on the way back from attending Yuko's funeral. However, both women wake up in 1981 with their next ten years' worth of memories intact. They set out to make better choices and save their futures from ruin.

== Cast ==
- Misa Shimizu as Yuko Nando
- Shizuka Kudo as Ginko Kanae
- David Ito as Takio Kurami
- Motoya Izumi as Toshiya Natsuki
- Toshiaki Karasawa as Kirinami
- Fujiko F. Fujio as Palmist (cameo)
- Isao Hashizume as Hitoshi Urusawa
- Ichirota Miyakawa as Ikuo Sugita
- Kimie Shingyoji as Fumiko Tashiro
- Tsuyoshi Ujiki as Machida
- Kyōka Suzuki as Hikaru Shimayama
- Fujio Akatsuka as Self – Manga Artist at the Party
- Fujiko A. Fujio as Self – Manga Artist at the Party
- Shotaro Ishinomori as Self – Manga Artist at the Party
- Go Nagai as Self – Manga Artist at the Party
- Takao Saito as Self – Manga Artist at the Party
- Jirō Tsunoda as Self – Manga Artist at the Party

== Awards and nominations ==
17th Hochi Film Awards

- Won: Best Actress – Misa Shimizu (also won for Sumo Do, Sumo Don't and Okoge)
