= 2005 in Japanese television =

Events in 2005 in Japanese television.

== Debuts ==
Show	Station	Premiere Date	Genre	Original Run
Absolute Boy	NHK	May 21	anime	May 21, 2005 – November 19, 2005
Amaenaide yo!!	AT-X	July 1	anime	July 1, 2005 – September 16, 2005
Ah My Goddess	TBS	January 6	anime	January 6, 2005 - July 7, 2005
Aikurushii	TBS	April 10	drama	April 10, 2005 – June 26, 2005
Air	BS-i	January 6	anime	January 6, 2005 - March 31, 2005
Air in Summer	BS-i	August 28	anime	August 28, 2005 – September 4, 2005
B-Legend! Battle B-Daman Fire Spirits	TV Tokyo	January 10	anime	January 10, 2005 – December 26, 2005
Black Cat	TBS	October 6	anime	October 6, 2005 – March 30, 2006
Chousei Kantai Sazer-X	TV Tokyo	October 1	tokusatsu	October 1, 2005 – June 24, 2006
Comic Party Revolution	tvk	June 27	anime	April 4, 2005 – June 27, 2005
Doraemon	TV Asahi	April 15	anime	April 15, 2005 – present
Eyeshield 21	TV Tokyo	April 6	anime	April 6, 2005 - March 19, 2008
Fushigiboshi no Futagohime	TV Tokyo	April 2	anime	April 2, 2005 – March 25, 2006
Futari wa Pretty Cure Max Heart	ABC TV	February 6	anime	February 6, 2005 – January 29, 2006
Ganbatte Ikimasshoi	Nippon TV	July 5	drama	July 5, 2005 – September 13, 2005
Garo	TV Tokyo	October 7	tokusatsu	October 7, 2005 – March 31, 2006
GIRLS Bravo second season	WOWOW	January 27	anime	January 27, 2005 – April 21, 2005
Haruka Seventeen	TV Asahi	July 1	drama	July 1, 2005 – September 16, 2005
Kamen Rider Hibiki	TV Asahi	January 30	tokusatsu	January 30, 2005 – January 22, 2006
Kitty's Paradise PLUS	TV Tokyo	October 4	children's variety	October 4, 2005 – September 30, 2008
MÄR	TV Tokyo	April 3	anime	April 3, 2005 – March 25, 2007
Magical Girl Lyrical Nanoha A's	Chiba TV	October 1	anime	October 1, 2005 – December 25, 2005
Mahou Sentai Magiranger	TV Asahi	February 13	tokusatsu	February 13, 2005 – February 12, 2006
Onegai My Melody	TV Osaka	April 3	anime	April 3, 2005 – March 26, 2006
Peach Girl	TV Tokyo	January 8	anime	January 8, 2005 – June 25, 2005
Psalms of Planets Eureka SeveN	MBS	April 17	anime	April 17, 2005 - April 2, 2006
Rockman EXE Beast	TV Tokyo	October 1	anime	October 1, 2005 - April 1, 2006
Shuffle!	WOWOW	July 7	anime	July 7, 2005 – January 5, 2006
Suzuka	TV Tokyo	July 6	anime	July 6, 2005 – December 28, 2005
Transformers: Galaxy Force	TV Tokyo	January 8	anime	January 8, 2005 – December 31, 2005
Tsubasa Chronicle	NHK	April 9	anime	April 9, 2005 - October 15, 2005
Ultraman Max	CBC	July 2	tokusatsu	July 2, 2005 – April 1, 2006
Water Boys 2005 Natsu	Fuji TV	August 19	drama	August 19, 2005 – August 20, 2005
Yoshitsune	NHK	January 9	drama	January 9, 2005 – December 11, 2005
Yume de Aimashou	TBS	April 14	drama	April 14, 2005 – June 23, 2005

== Ongoing shows ==
- Music Fair, music (1964–present)
- Mito Kōmon, jidaigeki (1969-2011)
- Sazae-san, anime (1969–present)
- FNS Music Festival, music (1974–present)
- Panel Quiz Attack 25, game show (1975–present)
- Soreike! Anpanman. anime (1988–present)
- Downtown no Gaki no Tsukai ya Arahende!!, game show (1989–present)
- Crayon Shin-chan, anime (1992–present)
- Shima Shima Tora no Shimajirō, anime (1993-2008)
- Nintama Rantarō, anime (1993–present)
- Chibi Maruko-chan, anime (1995–present)
- Detective Conan, anime (1996–present)
- SASUKE, sports (1997–present)
- Ojarumaru, anime (1998–present)
- One Piece, anime (1999–present)
- Pocket Monsters Advanced Generation, anime (2002-2006)
- Naruto, anime (2002–2007)
- Konjiki no Gash Bell!!, anime (2003-2006)
- Tottoko Hamtaro: Ham Ham Paradise!, anime (2004-2006)
- Initial D Fourth Stage, anime (2004-2006)
- Yu-Gi-Oh! Duel Monsters GX, anime (2004-2008)
- Sgt. Frog, anime (2004-2011)
- Bleach, anime (2004-2012)

== Hiatus ==
Show	Station	Hiatus Date	Genre	Original Run
Tsubasa Chronicle	NHK	October 15	anime	April 9, 2005 - October 15, 2005

== Endings ==
Show	Station	Ending Date	Genre	Original Run
Absolute Boy	NHK	November 19	anime	May 21, 2005 – November 19, 2005
Ah My Goddess	TBS	July 7	anime	January 6, 2005 - July 7, 2005
Aikurushii	TBS	June 26	drama	April 10, 2005 – June 26, 2005
Air	BS-i	March 31	anime	January 6, 2005 - March 31, 2005
Air in Summer	BS-i	September 4	anime	August 28, 2005 – September 4, 2005
Amaenaide yo!!	AT-X	July 1	anime	July 1, 2005 – September 16, 2005
B-Legend! Battle B-Daman Fire Spirits	TV Tokyo	December 26	anime	January 10, 2005 – December 26, 2005
Bobobo-bo Bo-bobo	TV Asahi	October 29	anime	November 8, 2003 – October 29, 2005
Comic Party Revolution	tvk	June 27	anime	April 4, 2005 – June 27, 2005
Doraemon	TV Asahi	March 18	anime	April 2, 1979 – March 18, 2005
Elemental Gelade	TV Tokyo	September 27	anime	April 5, 2005 - September 27, 2005
Futari wa Pretty Cure	TV Asahi	January 30	anime	February 1, 2004 – January 30, 2005
Ganbatte Ikimasshoi	Nippon TV	September 13	drama	July 5, 2005 – September 13, 2005
Genseishin Justirisers	TV Tokyo	September 24	tokusatsu	October 2, 2004 – September 24, 2005
Get Ride! Amdriver	TV Tokyo	March 28	anime	April 5, 2004 – March 28, 2005
GIRLS Bravo second season	WOWOW	April 21	anime	January 27, 2005 – April 21, 2005
Haruka Seventeen	TV Asahi	September 26	drama	July 1, 2005 – September 16, 2005
Kamen Rider Blade	TV Asahi	January 23	tokusatsu	January 25, 2004 – January 23, 2005
Kitty's Paradise Fresh	TV Tokyo	September 27	children's variety	October 1, 2002 – September 27, 2005
Magical Girl Lyrical Nanoha A's	Chiba TV	December 25	anime	October 1, 2005 – December 25, 2005
Peach Girl	TV Tokyo	June 25	anime	January 8, 2005 – June 25, 2005
Rockman EXE Stream	TV Tokyo	September 24	anime	October 2, 2004 - September 24, 2005
School Rumble	TV Tokyo	March 29	anime	October 5, 2004 – March 29, 2005
Suzuka	TV Tokyo	December 28	anime	July 6, 2005 – December 28, 2005
Tokusou Sentai Dekaranger	TV Asahi	February 6	tokusatsu	February 15, 2004 – February 6, 2005
Transformers: Galaxy Force	TV Tokyo	December 31	anime	January 8, 2005 – December 31, 2005
Tweeny Witches	NHK	March 4	anime	April 9, 2004 – March 4, 2005
Ultraman Nexus	CBC	June 25	tokusatsu	October 2, 2004 – June 25, 2005
Viewtiful Joe	TV Tokyo	September 24	anime	October 2, 2004 - September 24, 2005
Water Boys 2005 Natsu	Fuji TV	August 20	drama	August 19, 2005 – August 20, 2005
Yoshitsune	NHK	December 11	drama	January 9, 2005 – December 11, 2005
Yume de Aimashou	TBS	June 23	drama	April 14, 2005 – June 23, 2005

== See also ==
- 2005 in anime
- 2005 Japanese television dramas
- 2005 in Japan
- List of Japanese films of 2005
