= 2007 in Japanese television =

Events in 2007 in Japanese television.

== Debuts ==
Show	Station	Premiere Date	Genre	Original Run
Afro Samurai	WOWOW	May 3	anime	May 3, 2007 – May 4, 2007
Ancient Ruler Dinosaur King DKids Adventure	TV Asahi	February 4	anime	February 4, 2007 – January 27, 2008
Ayakashi	AT-X	December 12	anime	December 12, 2007 – March 5, 2008
Bakugan Battle Brawlers	TV Tokyo	April 5	anime	April 5, 2007 – March 27, 2008
Bambino!	NTV	April 18	drama	April 18, 2007 – June 27, 2007
Clannad	TBS	October 4	anime	October 4, 2007 – March 27, 2008
First Kiss	Fuji TV	July 9	drama	July 9, 2007 – September 17, 2007
Fūma no Kojirō	Tokyo MX	October 3	drama	October 3, 2007 – December 26, 2007
Galileo	Fuji TV	October 15	drama	October 15, 2007 – December 17, 2007
Hana Yori Dango Returns	TBS	January 5	drama	January 5, 2007 – March 16, 2007
Hanazakari no Kimitachi e	Fuji TV	July 3	drama	July 3, 2007 - September 18, 2007
Hataraki Man	NTV	October 10	drama	October 10, 2007 - December 19, 2007
Himitsu no Hanazono	Kansai TV	January 9	drama	January 9, 2007 – March 3, 2007
Hotaru no Hikari	NTV	July 11	drama	July 11, 2007 - September 12, 2007
Juken Sentai Gekiranger	TV Asahi	February 19	tokusatsu	February 18, 2007 – February 10, 2008
Kamen Rider Den-O	TV Asahi	January 28	tokusatsu	January 28, 2007 – January 20, 2008
Karei-naru Ichizoku	TBS	January 14	drama	January 14, 2007 – March 18, 2007
Kaze no Stigma	TVQ Kyushu Broadcasting	April 11	anime	April 11, 2007 – September 19, 2007
Kenko Zenrakei Suieibu Umisho	Independent UHF Stations	July 4	anime	July 4, 2007 – September 26, 2007
Kuitan 2	NTV	April 14	drama	April 14, 2007 – June 23, 2007
Liar Game	Fuji TV	April 14	drama	April 14, 2007 – June 23, 2007
Life	Fuji TV	June 30	drama	June 30, 2007 – September 15, 2007
Lucky Star	Chiba TV	April 8	anime	April 8, 2007 – September 16, 2007
Mop Girl	TV Asahi	October 12	drama	October 12, 2007 – December 14, 2007
Naruto: Shippuden	TV Tokyo	February 15	anime	February 15, 2007 – March 23, 2017
Operation Love	Fuji TV	April 16	drama	April 16, 2007 – June 25, 2007
Rental Magica	Chiba TV	October 7	anime	October 7, 2007 – March 23, 2008
Ryusei no Rockman Tribe	TV Tokyo	November 3	anime	November 3, 2007 - March 29, 2008
Sexy Voice and Robo	NTV	April 10	drama	April 10, 2007 – June 19, 2007
Shuffle! Memories	Independent UHF Stations	January 7	anime	January 7, 2007 – March 25, 2007
Sushi Ouji!	TV Asahi	July 27	drama	July 27, 2007 – September 14, 2007
SP	Fuji TV	November 3	drama	November 3, 2007 – January 12, 2008
Tantei Gakuen Q	NTV	July 3	drama	July 3, 2007 – September 11, 2007
Ultra Galaxy Mega Monster Battle	BS11	December 1	tokusatsu	December 1, 2007 – February 23, 2008
Ultraseven X	CBC	October 5	tokusatsu	October 5, 2007 – December 21, 2007
Watashitachi no Kyokasho	Fuji TV	April 12	drama	April 12, 2007 – June 28, 2007
Yama Onna Kabe Onna	Fuji TV	July 5	drama	July 5, 2007 – September 20, 2007
Yamada Tarō Monogatari	TBS	July 6	drama	July 6, 2007 - September 14, 2007
Yes! PreCure 5	ABC TV	February 4	anime	February 4, 2007 – January 27, 2008
You're Under Arrest: Full Throttle	TBS	October 4	anime	October 4, 2007 – March 27, 2008
Yukan Club	NTV	October 16	drama	October 16, 2007 - December 18, 2007

== Ongoing shows ==
- Music Fair, music (1964–present)
- Mito Kōmon, jidaigeki (1969-2011)
- Sazae-san, anime (1969–present)
- FNS Music Festival, music (1974–present)
- Panel Quiz Attack 25, game show (1975–present)
- Soreike! Anpanman. anime (1988–present)
- Downtown no Gaki no Tsukai ya Arahende!!, game show (1989–present)
- Crayon Shin-chan, anime (1992–present)
- Shima Shima Tora no Shimajirō, anime (1993-2008)
- Nintama Rantarō, anime (1993–present)
- Chibi Maruko-chan, anime (1995–present)
- Detective Conan, anime (1996–present)
- SASUKE, sports (1997–present)
- Ojarumaru, anime (1998–present)
- One Piece, anime (1999–present)
- Yu-Gi-Oh! Duel Monsters GX, anime (2004-2008)
- Sgt. Frog, anime (2004-2011)
- Bleach, anime (2004-2012)
- Eyeshield 21, anime (2005-2008)
- Kitty's Paradise PLUS, children's variety (2005-2008)
- Doraemon, anime (2005–present)
- Kirarin Revolution, anime (2006-2008)
- D.Gray-Man, anime (2006-2008)
- Gintama, anime (2006-2010)
- Pocket Monsters Diamond & Pearl, anime (2006-2010)

== Endings ==
Show	Station	Ending Date	Genre	Original Run
Afro Samurai	WOWOW	May 4	anime	May 3, 2007 – May 4, 2007
Bakegyamon	TV Tokyo	March 26	anime	April 3, 2006 - March 26, 2007
Buso Renkin	TV Tokyo	March 29	anime	October 5, 2006 - March 29, 2007
Digimon Savers	Fuji TV	March 25	anime	April 2, 2006 - March 25, 2007
Fūma no Kojirō	Tokyo MX	December 26	drama	October 3, 2007 – December 26, 2007
Fushigiboshi no Futagohime Gyu!	TV Tokyo	March 31	anime	April 1, 2006 – March 31, 2007
Futari wa Pretty Cure Splash Star	ABC TV	January 28	anime	February 5, 2006 – January 28, 2007
GoGo Sentai Boukenger	TV Asahi	February 11	tokusatsu	February 19, 2006 – February 11, 2007
Himitsu no Hanazono	Kansai TV	March 3	drama	January 9, 2007 – March 3, 2007
Kamen Rider Kabuto	TV Asahi	January 21	tokusatsu	January 29, 2006 – January 21, 2007
Kaze no Stigma	TVQ	September 19	anime	April 11, 2007 – September 19, 2007
Kanon	BS-i	March 15	anime	October 5, 2006 - March 15, 2007
Kenichi: The Mightiest Disciple	TV Tokyo	September 29	anime	October 7, 2006 – September 29, 2007
Kenko Zenrakei Suieibu Umisho	Independent UHF Stations	September 26	anime	July 4, 2007 – September 26, 2007
Lucky Star	Chiba TV	September 16	anime	April 8, 2007 – September 16, 2007
MÄR	TV Tokyo	March 25	anime	April 3, 2005 – March 25, 2007
Naruto	TV Tokyo	February 8	anime	October 3, 2002 - February 8, 2007
Ryusei no Rockman	TV Tokyo	October 27	anime	October 7, 2006 – October 27, 2007
Sexy Voice and Robo	Nippon TV	June 19	drama	April 10, 2007 – June 19, 2007
SHUFFLE! memories	Independent UHF Stations	March 25	anime	January 7, 2007 – March 25, 2007
Sumomomo Momomo: The Strongest Bride on Earth	TV Asahi	March 15	anime	October 5, 2006 - March 15, 2007
Ultraman Mebius	CBC	March 31	tokusatsu	April 8, 2006 – March 31, 2007
Ultraseven X	CBC	December 21	tokusatsu	October 5, 2007 – December 21, 2007
Watashitachi no Kyokasho	Fuji TV	April 12	drama	April 12, 2007 – June 28, 2007

== See also ==
- 2007 in anime
- 2007 Japanese television dramas
- 2007 in Japan
- 2007 in Japanese music
- List of Japanese films of 2007
