= 2001 in Japanese television =

Events in 2001 in Japanese television.

== Debuts ==
Show	Station	Genre	Original Run
A Little Snow Fairy Sugar	TBS	anime	October 2, 2001 – March 26, 2002
Angel Tales	WOWOW	anime	October 4, 2001 - December 20, 2001
Ashita ga Arusa	Nippon TV	drama	April 21, 2001 - June 30, 2001
Ask Dr. Rin!	TV Tokyo	anime	March 5, 2001 – February 25, 2002
Bakuten Shoot Beyblade	TV Tokyo	anime	January 8, 2001 - December 24, 2001
Comic Party	TV Kanagawa	anime	April 2, 2001 - June 25, 2001
Cyborg 009: The Cyborg Soldier	TV Tokyo	anime	October 14, 2001 – October 13, 2002
Digimon Tamers	Fuji TV	anime	April 1, 2001 - March 31, 2002
Fruits Basket	TV Tokyo	anime	July 5, 2001 - December 27, 2001
Galaxy Angel	Animax	anime	April 7, 2001 - September 29, 2001
Groove Adventure RAVE	TBS	anime	October 13, 2001 – September 28, 2002
Hero	Fuji TV	drama	January 8, 2001 – March 19, 2001
Hikaru no Go	TV Tokyo	anime	October 10, 2001 – March 26, 2003
Hellsing	Fuji TV	anime	October 10, 2001 – January 16, 2002
Hyakujuu Sentai Gaoranger	TV Asahi	tokusatsu	February 18, 2001 – February 10, 2002
I My Me! Strawberry Eggs	WOWOW	anime	July 4, 2001 - September 26, 2001
Kamen Rider Agito	TV Asahi	tokusatsu	January 28, 2001 – January 27, 2002
Kirby of the Stars	CBC	anime	October 6, 2001 – September 27, 2003
Martial Arts Cooking Legend Bistro Recipe	NHK	anime	December 11, 2001 - June 25, 2002
Mobile Angel: Angelic Layer	TV Tokyo	anime	April 1, 2001 - September 23, 2001
Motto! Ojamajo Doremi	TV Asahi	anime	February 4, 2001 – January 27, 2002
PaRappa the Rapper	Fuji TV	anime	April 14, 2001 – January 14, 2002
s-CRY-ed	TV Tokyo	anime	July 4, 2001 - December 26, 2001
Shaman King	TV Tokyo	anime	July 4, 2001 - September 25, 2002
Shin Shirayuki Hime Densetsu Pretear	WOWOW	anime	April 4, 2001 - June 27, 2001
Super GALS! Kotobuki Ran	TV Tokyo	anime	April 1, 2001 - March 31, 2002
The Prince of Tennis	TV Tokyo	anime	October 10, 2001 – March 30, 2005
The SoulTaker	WOWOW	anime	April 4, 2001 - July 4, 2001
Ultraman Cosmos	TBS	tokusatsu	July 7, 2001 – September 28, 2002
X	WOWOW	anime	October 3, 2001 – March 27, 2002
You're Under Arrest	TBS	anime	April 7, 2001 – September 29, 2001

== Ongoing shows ==
- Music Fair, music (1964–present)
- Mito Kōmon, jidaigeki (1969-2011)
- Sazae-san, anime (1969–present)
- FNS Music Festival, music (1974–present)
- Panel Quiz Attack 25, game show (1975–present)
- Doraemon, anime (1979-2005)
- Soreike! Anpanman, anime (1988–present)
- Downtown no Gaki no Tsukai ya Arahende!!, game show (1989–present)
- Crayon Shin-chan, anime (1992–present)
- Shima Shima Tora no Shimajirō, anime (1993-2008)
- Nintama Rantarō, anime (1993–present)
- Chibi Maruko-chan, anime (1995–present)
- Kochira Katsushika-ku Kameari Kōen-mae Hashutsujo, anime (1996-2004)
- Detective Conan, anime (1996–present)
- SASUKE, sports (1997–present)
- Ojarumaru, anime (1998–present)
- Pocket Monsters, anime (1998-2002)
- One Piece, anime (1999–present)
- Daa! Daa! Daa!, anime (2000-2002)
- Kitty's Paradise GOLD, children's variety (2000-2002)
- Hajime no Ippo: THE FIGHTING!, anime (2000-2002)
- InuYasha, anime (2000-2004)
- Tottoko Hamtaro, anime (2000-2004)
- Yu-Gi-Oh! Duel Monsters, anime (2000-2004)

== Endings ==
Show	Station	Ending Date	Genre	Original Run
Android Kikaider: The Animation	Kids Station	January 8	anime	October 16, 2000 – January 8, 2001
Angel Tales	WOWOW	December 20	anime	October 4, 2001 - December 20, 2001
Argento Soma	TV Tokyo	March 22	anime	October 6, 2000 – March 22, 2001
Ashita Ga Arusa	Nippon TV	June 30	drama	April 21, 2001 - June 30, 2001
Baby Felix	NHK	June 29	anime	October 8, 2000 – June 29, 2001
Bakuten Shoot Beyblade	TV Tokyo	December 24	anime	January 8, 2001 - December 24, 2001
Comic Party	TV Kanagawa	June 25	anime	April 2, 2001 - June 25, 2001
Digimon Adventure 02	Fuji TV	March 25	anime	April 2, 2000 - March 25, 2001
Fruits Basket	TV Tokyo	December 27	anime	July 5, 2001 - December 27, 2001
Galaxy Angel	Animax	September 29	anime	April 7, 2001 - September 29, 2001
Gensomaden Saiyuki	TV Tokyo	March 27	anime	April 4, 2000 – March 27, 2001
Ghost Stories	Fuji TV	March 15	anime	October 22, 2000 - March 15, 2001
Gravitation	WOWOW	January 10	anime	October 4, 2000 – January 10, 2001
Hero	Fuji TV	March 19	drama	January 8, 2001 – March 19, 2001
Hunter × Hunter	Fuji TV	March 31	anime	October 16, 1999 - March 31, 2001
I My Me! Strawberry Eggs	WOWOW	September 26	anime	July 4, 2001 - September 26, 2001
Kamen Rider Kuuga	TV Asahi	January 21	tokusatsu	January 30, 2000 – January 21, 2001
Kyorochan	TV Tokyo	March 29	anime	July 1, 1999 - March 29, 2001
Mighty Cat Masked Niyandar	Nagoya TV	September 30	anime	February 6, 2000 - September 30, 2001
Mirai Sentai Timeranger	TV Asahi	February 11	tokusatsu	February 13, 2000 – February 11, 2001
Monster Farm	TBS	September 30	anime	April 17, 1999 – September 30, 2001
Mobile Angel: Angelic Layer	TV Tokyo	September 23	anime	April 1, 2001 - September 23, 2001
Ojamajo Doremi #	TV Asahi	January 29	anime	February 6, 2000 - January 29, 2001
Shin Shirayuki Hime Densetsu Pretear	WOWOW	June 27	anime	April 4, 2001 - June 27, 2001
The SoulTaker	WOWOW	July 4	anime	April 4, 2001 - July 4, 2001
Ultraman Neos	CBC	January 28	tokusatsu	November 22, 2000 – January 28, 2001
You're Under Arrest	TBS	September 29	anime	April 7, 2001 – September 29, 2001
s-CRY-ed	TV Tokyo	December 26	anime	July 4, 2001 - December 26, 2001

== TV Specials ==
Show	Station	Genre	Original Run
Di Gi Charat: Ohanami Special	TBS	anime	April 6, 2001
Di Gi Charat: Natsuyasumi Special	TBS	anime	August 2, 2001 - August 3, 2001
Di Gi Charat: Tsuyu Special	TBS	drama	August 25, 2001

== See also ==
- 2001 in anime
- List of Japanese television dramas
- 2001 in Japan
- List of Japanese films of 2001
