= 2015 in Japanese television =

Events in 2015 in Japanese television.

== Events ==
Date	Event
January 1-April 30	Between January 1, 2015 and April 30, 2015, analog cable television services were shut down by the country's cable providers.
September 27	The 2015 Formula One World Championship will be held at 2015 Japanese Grand Prix.
October 11	The 2015 MotoGP World Championship will be held at 2015 Japanese motorcycle Grand Prix.

== Debuts ==
Start date	Show	Channel	Type	Source
January 4	Absolute Duo	AT-X, Tokyo MX, Sun TV, KBS, TV Aichi, BS11	Anime	
January 7	Miritari!	AT-X, KBS, TVS, tvk, SUN	Anime	
January 8	Saenai Heroine no Sodatekata	Fuji TV	Anime	
January 9	Assassination Classroom	Fuji TV	Anime	
January 10	Kuroko's Basketball 3rd season	MBS, Tokyo MX, BS11	Anime	
January 10	The Rolling Girls	MBS, Tokyo MX, BS11	Anime	
January 10	Gakkō no Kaidan	NTV	Drama	
January 13	Masshiro	TBS	Drama	
January 11	Aldnoah.Zero	Tokyo MX, BS11	Anime	
January 11	Dog Days''	Tokyo MX	Anime	
January 15	Durarara!!x2	Tokyo MX, MBS, CBC, Gunma TV, Tochigi TV, BS11	Anime	
January 8	Kantai Collection	Tokyo MX	Anime	
January 9	Sōkyū no Fafner: Dead Aggressor: Exodus	MBS, TBS, CBC, BS-TBS	Anime	
January 10	The IDOLM@STER Cinderella Girls	Tokyo MX, BS11	Anime	
January 16	Ouroboros~Kono Ai Koso, Seigi	TBS	Drama	
February 1	Go! Princess PreCure	TV Asahi	Anime	
February 22	Shuriken Sentai Ninninger	TV Asahi	Tokusatsu	
April 3	Food Wars!: Shokugeki no Soma	TBS	Anime	
April 4	Uta no Prince-sama 3rd season	Tokyo MX	Anime	
April 11	Do S Deka	NTV	Drama	
April 10	Algernon ni Hanataba o	TBS	Drama	
April 13	Yōkoso, Wagaya e	Fuji TV	Drama	
April 15	Dr.Rintarō	NTV	Drama	
April 16	Yamegoku: Yakuza Yamete Itadakimasu	TBS	Drama	
April 16	I'm Home	TV Asahi	Drama	
June 19	The Last Cop	NTV	Drama	
June 20	Dragon Ball Super	Fuji TV	Anime	
July 5	Death Note	NTV	Drama	
July 7	Hotel Concierge	TBS	Drama	
July 8	Hanasaki Mai ga Damattenai 2nd season	NTV	Drama	
July 9	Tantei no Tantei	Fuji TV	Drama	
July 11	Dokonjō Gaeru	NTV	Comedy	
July 11	Hatsumori Bemars	TV Tokyo	Drama	
July 14	Ultraman X	TV Tokyo	Tokusatsu	
July 17	Omotesando High School Chorus Club!	TBS	Drama	
July 20	Koinaka	Fuji TV	Drama	
July 24	Fate/kaleid liner Prisma Illya 2wei Herz!	Tokyo MX	Anime	
October 4	Kamen Rider Ghost	TV Asahi	Tokusatsu	
October 4	Meet Up at the Pokémon House?	TV Tokyo	Variety	
October 6	Mr. Osomatsu	TV Tokyo	Anime	
October 7	Couple of disguise	NTV	Drama	
October 10	Okitegami Kyōko no Bibōroku	NTV	Drama	
October 12	5-ji Kara 9-ji Made: Watashi ni Koi Shita Obōsan	Fuji TV	Drama	
October 15	Adult Woman	Fuji TV	Drama	
October 16	Kounodori	TBS	Drama	
October 18	Shitamachi Rocket	TBS	Drama	
November 7	Transit Girls	Fuji TV	Drama	

== Ongoing ==
- AKB48 Show!, variety (2013–present)
- AKBingo!, variety (2008–present)
- Music Fair, music (1964–present)
- Sazae-san, anime (1969–present)
- FNS Music Festival, music (1974–present)
- Panel Quiz Attack 25, game show (1975–present)
- Soreike! Anpanman, anime (1988–present)
- Downtown no Gaki no Tsukai ya Arahende!!, game show (1989–present)
- Crayon Shin-chan, anime (1992–present)
- Nintama Rantarō, anime (1993–present)
- Chibi Maruko-chan, anime (1995–present)
- Detective Conan, anime (1996–present)
- SASUKE, sports (1997–present)
- Ojarumaru, anime (1998–present)
- One Piece, anime (1999–present)
- Doraemon, anime (2005–present)
- Naruto: Shippuden, anime (2007–2017)
- Aikatsu!, anime (2012-2016)
- Tetsujin 28-go Gao!, anime (2013–2016)
- Pocket Monsters XY, anime (2013–2016)
- Fairy Tail, anime (2014–2016)
- PriPara, anime (2014–2017)
- Yo-kai Watch, anime (2014–2018)
- Yu-Gi-Oh! Arc-V, anime (2014–2017)
- World Trigger, anime (2014–2016)
- Cardfight!! Vanguard G GIRS Crisis, anime (2015–2016)

== Returning Series ==
- Majisuka Gakuen, drama (2010-2012; 2015–present) Moved to NTV
- NogiBingo!, variety (2013–present)

== Ended ==
- JoJo's Bizarre Adventure: Stardust Crusaders, anime (2014-2015)
- Dragon Ball Kai, anime (2014–2015)
- Sailor Moon Crystal, ONA 1st Season (2014-2015)
- Idoling!!!, variety show (2006-2015)
- Cardfight!! Vanguard G, anime (2014–2015)
- Utage!, musical (2013-2015)
- Tamagotchi, anime (2009-2015)
- Ultraman X, tokusatsu (2015)
- Kamen Rider Drive, tokusatsu (2014-2015)
- Ressha Sentai ToQger, tokusatsu (2014-2015)

== Deaths ==
Date	Name	Age	Notability	Source
Jan. 15	Chikao Ōtsuka	85	Actor and voice actor, known for his role as Doctor Eggman in the Sonic the Hedgehog series, also had roles in Dragon Ball, Digimon Adventure and One Piece among others. Was also the dub voice for Captain Hook and Dick Dastardly.	
Jun. 18	Kazuya Tatekabe	80	Actor and voice actor, known for his role as Jaian in the Doraemon (1979 anime), also had roles in Time Bokan and Yatterman. Was also the dub voice for others.	
Oct. 27	Miyu Matsuki	38	Voice actress; her last role was Anna, in Shimonetta.	

== See also ==
- 2015 in anime
- 2015 Japanese television dramas
- 2015 in Japan
- 2015 in Japanese music
- List of Japanese films of 2015
