= 2000 in Japanese television =

Events in 2000 in Japanese television.

== Events ==
- December 1 - Digital BS satellite broadcasts begin using the ISDB-S standard. Ten channels are initially available: the four existing analog satellite channels (NHK BS1, NHK BS2, NHK BShi, and WOWOW), Star Channel, and the newly-launched channels BS Asahi, BS Fuji, BS-i, BS Japan, and BS NTV.

== Debuts ==
Show	Station	Premiere Date	Genre	Original Run
Android Kikaider: The Animation	Kids Station	October 16th	anime	October 16, 2000 – January 8, 2001
Argento Soma	TV Tokyo	October 6th	anime	October 6, 2000 – March 22, 2001
Baby Felix	NHK	October 8th	anime	October 8, 2000 – June 29, 2001
Boys Be...	WOWOW	April 11th	anime	April 11, 2000 - July 4, 2000
Carried by the Wind: Tsukikage Ran	WOWOW	January 26th	anime	January 26, 2000 – April 19, 2000
Ceres Celestial Legend	WOWOW	April 20th	anime	April 20, 2000 – September 28, 2000
Daa! Daa! Daa!	NHK	March 28th	anime	March 28, 2000 – February 26, 2002
Digimon Adventure 02	Fuji TV	April 2nd	anime	April 2, 2000 - March 25, 2001
Ghost Stories	Fuji TV	October 22nd	anime	October 22, 2000 - March 15, 2001
Gate Keepers	WOWOW	April 3rd	anime	April 3, 2000 – September 18, 2000
Gensomaden Saiyuki	TV Tokyo	April 4th	anime	April 4, 2000 – March 27, 2001
Gravitation	WOWOW	October 4th	anime	October 4, 2000 – January 10, 2001
Hajime no Ippo: THE FIGHTING!	Nippon TV	October 3rd	anime	October 3, 2000 - March 26, 2002
InuYasha	Yomiuri TV	October 16th	anime	October 16, 2000 – September 13, 2004
Kamen Rider Kuuga	TV Asahi	January 30th	tokusatsu	January 30, 2000 – January 21, 2001
Kitty's Paradise GOLD	TV Tokyo	April 4th	children's variety	April 4, 2000 – September 24, 2002
Mighty Cat Masked Niyandar	Nagoya TV	February 6th	anime	February 6, 2000 - September 30, 2001
Mirai Sentai Timeranger	TV Asahi	February 13th	tokusatsu	February 13, 2000 – February 11, 2001
Mushrambo	TV Asahi	February 5th	anime	February 5, 2000 - September 23, 2000
Ojamajo Doremi #	TV Asahi	February 6th	anime	February 6, 2000 - January 29, 2001
Sakura Wars	TBS	April 8th	anime	April 8, 2000 - September 23, 2000
Shomuni	Fuji TV	April 12th	drama	April 12, 2000 – June 28, 2000
Transformers: Car Robots	TV Tokyo	April 5th	anime	April 5, 2000 - December 27, 2000
Ultraman Neos	CBC	November 22nd	tokusatsu	November 22, 2000 – January 28, 2001
Yu-Gi-Oh! Duel Monsters	TV Tokyo	April 18th	anime	April 18, 2000 - September 29, 2004

== Ongoing shows ==
- Music Fair, music (1964–present)
- Mito Kōmon, jidaigeki (1969-2011)
- Monster Farm, anime (1999-2001)
- Sazae-san, anime (1969–present)
- FNS Music Festival, music (1974-present)
- Panel Quiz Attack 25, game show (1975–present)
- Doraemon, anime (1979-2005)
- Soreike! Anpanman, anime (1988-present)
- Downtown no Gaki no Tsukai ya Arahende!!, game show (1989–present)
- Crayon Shin-chan, anime (1992-present)
- Shima Shima Tora no Shimajirō, anime (1993-2008)
- Nintama Rantarō, anime (1993–present)
- Chibi Maruko-chan, anime (1995-present)
- Kochira Katsushika-ku Kameari Kōen-mae Hashutsujo, anime (1996-2004)
- Detective Conan, anime (1996–present)
- SASUKE, sports (1997-present)
- Ojarumaru, anime (1998-present)
- Pocket Monsters, anime (1998-2002)
- Kyorochan, anime (1999-2001)
- Hunter × Hunter, anime (1999-2001)
- One Piece, anime (1999–present)

== Endings ==
Show	Station	Ending Date	Genre	Original Run
Blue Gender	TBS	March 30th	anime	October 7, 1999 - March 30, 2000
Bomberman B-Daman Bakugaiden V	Nagoya TV	January 30th	anime	February 7, 1999 - January 30, 2000
Boys Be...	WOWOW	July 4th	anime	April 11, 2000 - July 4, 2000
Cardcaptor Sakura	NHK BS2	March 21st	anime	September 7, 1999 – March 21, 2000
Carried by the Wind: Tsukikage Ran	WOWOW	April 19th	anime	January 26, 2000 – April 19, 2000
Ceres Celestial Legend	WOWOW	September 28th	anime	April 20, 2000 – September 28, 2000
Digimon Adventure	Fuji TV	March 26th	anime	March 7, 1999 – March 26, 2000
Gate Keepers	WOWOW	September 18th	anime	April 3, 2000 – September 18, 2000
Initial D: Second Stage	Fuji TV	January 6th	anime	October 14, 1999 - January 6, 2000
Kamikaze Kaito Jeanne	TV Asahi	January 29th	anime	February 13, 1999 – January 29, 2000
Kitty's Paradise II	TV Tokyo	March 28th	children's variety	October 5, 1999 - March 28, 2000
Infinite Ryvius	TV Tokyo	March 23rd	anime	October 6, 1999 - March 23, 2000
Jibaku-kun	TV Tokyo	March 28th	anime	October 5, 1999 - March 28, 2000
Kyuukyuu Sentai GoGoFive	TV Asahi	February 6th	tokusatsu	February 21, 1999 – February 6, 2000
Moero!! Robocon	TV Asahi	January 31st	tokusatsu	January 31, 1999 – January 23, 2000
Mushrambo	TV Asahi	September 23rd	anime	February 5, 2000 - September 23, 2000
Ojamajo Doremi	TV Asahi	January 30th	anime	February 7, 1999 - January 30, 2000
Sakura Wars	TBS	September 23rd	anime	April 8, 2000 - September 23, 2000
Sorcerous Stabber Orphen 2: Revenge	TBS	March 26th	anime	October 2, 1999 – March 26, 2000
Transformers: Car Robots	TV Tokyo	December 27th	anime	April 5, 2000 - December 27, 2000
Trouble Chocolate	TV Asahi	March 24th	anime	October 8, 1999 - March 24, 2000

== TV Specials ==
Show	Station	Genre	Original Run
Di Gi Charat: Summer Special 2000	TBS	anime	August 22, 2000 - August 23, 2000
Di Gi Charat: Christmas Special	TBS	anime	December 16, 2000
G-Saviour	TV Asahi	drama	December 29, 2000

== See also ==
- 2000 in anime
- List of Japanese television dramas
- 2000 in Japan
- List of Japanese films of 2000
