= 2018 in Japanese television =

Events in 2018 in Japanese television.

== Events ==
Date	Event
January 30	Nickelodeon's Japanese channel launches for the second time.
April 8	AKB48 Show! changes its timeslot on BS Premium from Saturday 23:45 JST to Sunday 23:00 JST.
May 3	Boruto: Naruto Next Generations changes its timeslot on TV Tokyo from Wednesday 17:55 JST to Thursday 19:25 JST.
September 2	AKB48 Show! changes its timeslot once again in BS Premium and starts 10 minutes earlier, at Sunday 22:50 JST.
October 7	Boruto: Naruto Next Generations changes its timeslot on TV Tokyo from Thursday 19:25 JST to Sunday 17:30 JST.
October 7	Pokémon Sun & Moon changes its timeslot on TV Tokyo from Thursday 18:55 JST to Sunday 18:00 JST.
October 7	The 2018 Formula One World Championship will be held at 2018 Japanese Grand Prix.
October 21	The 2018 MotoGP World Championship will be held at 2018 Japanese motorcycle Grand Prix.

== Ongoing ==
Show	Type	Channel	First aired	Source
AKB48 Show!	Variety Show, Music	BS Premium, NHK World Premium	October 5, 2013	
AKBingo!	Variety Show	Nippon Television	October 1, 2008	
Black Clover	Anime	TV Tokyo	October 3, 2017	
Boruto: Naruto Next Generations	Anime	TV Tokyo	April 5, 2017	
Chibi Maruko-chan	Anime	Fuji Television	January 8, 1995	
Count Down TV	Music	Tokyo Broadcasting System	April 7, 1993	
Crayon Shin-chan	Anime	TV Asahi	April 13, 1992	
Detective Conan	Anime	NNS	January 8, 1996	
Doraemon	Anime	TV Asahi	April 15, 2005	
Downtown no Gaki no Tsukai ya Arahende!!	Game-Show	Nippon Television	October 3, 1989	
FNS Music Festival	Music	Fuji Television	July 2, 1974	
Music Fair	Music	Fuji Television	August 31, 1964	
Music Station	Music	TV Asahi	October 24, 1986	
NHK Amateur Song Contest	Talent Show	NHK-G, NHK World Premium	March 15, 1953 (TV)	
Nintama Rantarō	Anime	NHK	April 10, 1993	
Ojarumaru	Anime	NHK	October 5, 1998	
One Piece	Anime	Fuji Television	October 20, 1999	
Panel Quiz Attack 25	Game-Show	TV Asahi	April 6, 1975	
Pokémon Sun & Moon	Anime	TV Tokyo	November 17, 2016	
Sasuke	Sports	Tokyo Broadcasting System	September 26, 1997	
Sazae-san	Anime	Fuji Television	October 5, 1969	
Soreike! Anpanman	Anime	Nippon Television	October 3, 1988	
Super Hero Time	Tokusatsu	TV Asahi	September 28, 2003	
Utacon	Music	NHK-G, NHK World Premium	April 22, 2016	
With Mother	Kids	E-TV, NHK World Premium	October 5, 1959	
Yu-Gi-Oh! VRAINS	Anime	TV Tokyo	May 10, 2017	

== New shows and returning series ==
Show	Network	Premiere	Finale	Status	Source
Ultraman Orb: The Chronicle	TV Tokyo	January 6	June 30	Series Ended	
Cardcaptor Sakura: Clear Card	NHK, Crunchyroll	January 7	June 10	Series Ended	
Idolish7	Tokyo MX	January 7	May 19	Series Ended	
Segodon	NHK	January 7	December 16	Series Ended	
Yowamushi Pedal 4: Glory Line	TV Tokyo	January 9	June 25	Series Ended	
Violet Evergarden	Tokyo MX	January 10	April 4	Series Ended	
Beatless	MBS	January 12	September 28	Series Ended	
Dagashi Kashi – Season 2	TBS	January 12	March 31	Series Ended	
Seven Deadly Sins: Revival of the Commandments	JNN	January 12	June 30	Series Ended	
Spring Has Come	WOWOW	January 13	February 10	Series Ended	
Princess Jellyfish	Fuji Television	January 15	March 19	Series Ended	
Seven Heavenly Virtues	AT-X	January 26	March 30	Series Ended	
Fate/Extra Last Encore	Tokyo MX	January 27	March 31	Series Ended	
Hugtto! PreCure	TV Asahi	February 4	January 27, 2019	Ending 2019	
Lupinranger VS Patoranger	TV Asahi	February 11	February 10, 2019	Ending 2019	
GeGeGe no Kitarō	Fuji Television	April 1	March 29, 2020	Continues 2019	
Magic × Warrior Magimajo Pures!	TV Tokyo	April 1	March 24, 2019	Ending 2019	
Half Blue Sky	NHK	April 2	September 29	Series Ended	
Uma Musume Pretty Derby	Tokyo MX	April 2	June 17	Series Ended	
Gundam Build Divers	TV Tokyo	April 3	September 25	Series Ended	
Lupin the Third Part 5	Nippon TV	April 4	September 18	Seried Ended	
Aikatsu Friends!	TV Tokyo	April 5	September 26, 2019	Continues 2019	
Inazuma Eleven: Ares	TV Tokyo	April 6	September 28	Series Ended	
Major 2nd	NHK-E	April 7	September 22	Season Ended; Renewed for 2nd Season	
My Hero Academia – Season 3	Nippon Television	April 7	September 29	Season Ended; Renewed for 4th Season	
Sword Art Online Alternative Gun Gale Online	Tokyo MX	April 7	June 30	Series Ended	
Kiratto Pri Chan	TV Tokyo	April 8	Currently Airing	Continues 2019	
Layton Mystery Tanteisha: Katori no Nazotoki File	Fuji TV	April 8	March 31, 2019	Ending 2019	
High School DxD: Hero	AT-X	April 10	June 27	Series Ended	
Yo-kai Watch Shadowside	TV Tokyo	April 13	March 29, 2019	Ending 2019	
Cardfight!! Vanguard: DX	Tokyo MX	May 5	May 4, 2019	Continues 2019	
Harukana Receive	Tokyo MX	July 6	September 21	Series Ended	
Ultraman R/B	TV Tokyo	July 7	December 22	Series Ended	
Shingeki no Kyojin – Season 3	NHK	July 23	October 15	Season Paused; To be resumed 2019	
Kamen Rider Zi-O	TV Asahi	September 2	August 25, 2019	Continues 2019	
Manpuku	NHK	October 1	March 30, 2019	Ending 2019	
Inazuma Eleven: Orion no Kokuin	TV Tokyo	October 5	September 27, 2019	Continues 2019	
JoJo's Bizarre Adventure: Golden Wind	Tokyo MX	October 6	July 28, 2019	Continues 2019	
Fairy Tail: The Final Chapter	TV Tokyo	October 7	September 29, 2019	Continues 2019	
Sword Art Online: Alicization	Tokyo MX	October 7	March 30, 2019	Continues 2019	
Senran Kagura Shinovi Master -Tokyo Yōma-hen-	Tokyo MX	October 13	December 27	Series Ended	

== Ending ==
End date	Show	Channel	First aired	Replaced by	Source
January 28	Kirakira PreCure a la Mode	TV Asahi	February 5, 2017	Hugtto! PreCure	
February 4	Uchuu Sentai Kyuranger	TV Asahi	February 12, 2017	Lupinranger VS Patoranger	
March 3	Banana Zero Music (2nd Series)	NHK	April 23, 2016	Arita P Entertainer	
March 25	Dragon Ball Super	Fuji Television	July 5, 2015	GeGeGe no Kitarō	
March 25	Idol x Warrior Miracle Tunes!	TV Tokyo	April 2, 2017	Magic × Warrior Magimajo Pures!	
March 27	Idol Time PriPara	TV Tokyo	April 4, 2017	Gundam Build Divers	
March 29	Aikatsu Stars!	TV Tokyo	April 7, 2016	Aikatsu Friends!	
March 30	Yo-kai Watch	TV Tokyo	January 8, 2014	Yo-kai Watch Shadowside	
March 31	Warotenka	NHK	October 2, 2017	Half Blue Sky	
March 31	Mecha-Mecha Iketeru!	Fuji Television	October 19, 1996	Sekai! Goku taun ni sunde miru	
April 1	Cardfight!! Vanguard G: Z	TV Tokyo	October 8, 2017	Kiratto Pri Chan	
April 1	Monster Hunter Stories: Ride On	Fuji Television	October 2, 2016	Layton Mystery Tanteisha: Katori no Nazotoki File	
August 26	Kamen Rider Build	TV Asahi	September 3, 2017	Kamen Rider Zi-O	
August 30	Kamisama Minarai: Himitsu no Cocotama	TV Tokyo	October 1, 2015	Kira Kira Happy Hirake! Cocotama	

== Sports ==
Airdate	Sports	Network	Source
October 7	2018 Formula One World Championship	Fuji TV Next	
October 21	2018 MotoGP World Championship	G+	

== Special events and milestone episodes ==
Airdate	Show	Network	Source
January 20	The 7th AKB48 Kouhaku Taikou Utagassen	BS Sky Perfect	
March 3	NHK Nodojiman: Champion Taikai 2018	NHK	
March 25	Masashi Sada Midnight Special: SadaFes 2018	NHK	
March 29	Aikatsu Stars! #100 – Series Finale; To the Unseen Future	TV Tokyo	
April 7	CDTV 25th Anniversary Celebration Special	Tokyo Broadcasting System	
May 5	Detective Conan #900; Solving Mysteries in a Locked Room	NNS	
July 10	AKBingo! #500; What is Team 8? (Part 2)	Nippon Television	
July 25	FNS Uta no Natsu Matsuri 2018	Fuji Television	
August 5	Miitsuketa! – The Stage Show	NHK-E & World Premium	
August 18	50th Melody of Memories	NHK-G & World Premium	
August 21	Teacher Itsuki's School of Songs: The Midsummer Special Lesson	NHK-G & World Premium	
August 25 & 26	24 Hour Television 2018	Nippon Television	
September 8 & 9	FNS 27 Hour TV	Fuji Television	
September 17	Music Station Ultra Fes 2018	TV Asahi	
October 14	AKB48 Show! #200; Party ga Hajimaru yo/Sekai to Hito e/Kimi wa Melody/Sentimental Train	BS Premium	
October 23	Utacon #100; The 100th Festival - Fall Songs from Sendai	NHK	
December 5	2018 FNS Music Festival; Part 1	Fuji Television	
December 7	Animelo Summer Live 2018: OK!; Day 1 (August 24, 2018)	BS Fuji	
December 12	2018 FNS Music Festival; Part 2	Fuji Television	
December 14	Animelo Summer Live 2018: OK!; Day 2 (August 25, 2018)	BS Fuji	
December 21	Animelo Summer Live 2018: OK!; Day 3 (August 26, 2018)	BS Fuji	
December 21	Music Station Super Live 2018	TV Asahi	
December 30	The 60th Japan Record Awards	Tokyo Broadcasting System	
December 31	69th NHK Kōhaku Uta Gassen	NHK	
December 31	Johnny's Countdown 2018-19	Fuji Television	

== Deaths ==
Date	Name	Aged	Notable Works	Source
February 8	Makiko Nitta	56	Voice actress; aortic dissection.	
February 21	Ren Osugi	66	Supporting actor; cast of Crying 100 Times: Every Raindrop Falls and Back Street Girls: Gokudols.	
April 5	Isao Takahata	82	Director, producer, screenwriter and co-founder of Studio Ghibli	
May 16	Hideki Saijo	63	Singer and songwriter, participated 18 times on annual NHK's Kouhaku Utagassen.	
June 29	Steve Ditko	90	Original co-creator of Marvel's Spider-Man, a character that had a Japanese live-action series in 1978, and also a protagonic role in Marvel Disk Wars: The Avengers on 2014.	
July 6	Shota Nakao	22	Performer and member from LDH's FANTASTICS from EXILE TRIBE.	
August 4	Masahiko Tsugawa	78	Actor, film director and critic; Heart failure.	
August 10	Kin Sugai	92	Actress, noctable for the role of the mother-in-law of the protagonist in NHK's Taiga drama series Inochi; Heart failure.	
August 13	Unshō Ishizuka	67	Actor, voice actor and director, most notably by providing the voice from Professor Oak in Pokémon, Monarca La Deus in Flashman and Heihachi Mishima in Tekken Series.	
August 15	Kunihiro Abe	50	Animator, most notably for Gundam Series.	
August 15	Momoko Sakura	53	Manga artist, most notably for Chibi Maruko-chan.	
October 17	Nobuo Tanaka	83	Narrator from Super Sentai Series.	
October 19	Takanobu Hozumi	87	Voice actor.	
October 23	Kouji Tsujitani	56	Voice actor, most notably for InuYasha and Yu Yu Hakusho.	
November 6	Tetsuo Gotō	68	Voice actor, most notably for One Piece and Dragon Ball Super.	
November 12	Stan Lee	95	Original co-creator of many Marvel Comics characters that were adapted on many Japanese TV shows (both anime and tokusatsu).	
November 13	Ken Narita	73	Singer most notably for Denshi Sentai Denziman and Cyborg 009.	

== See also ==
- 2018 in anime
- 2018 in Japan
- 2018 in Japanese music
- List of Japanese films of 2018
