= Misa Shimizu =

Japanese actress

- Born: 25 September 1970 (age 56); Tanashi, Tokyo, Japan
- Occupation: Actress
- Years active: 1987–present

Misa Shimizu (清水美沙, Shimizu Misa; born 25 September 1970) is a Japanese actress. She made her screen debut by winning the heroine audition for 1987 film Shōnan Bōsōzoku. She starred in NHK's morning drama series Seishun Kazoku in 1989. She portrayed Keiko, the female protagonist, in Palme d'Or winning The Eel directed by Shohei Imamura. She also makes regular appearances in Masayuki Suo's films. She won the award for best actress at the 17th Hochi Film Award for Okoge, Sumo Do, Sumo Don't, Future Memories: Last Christmas.

== Filmography ==
=== Film ===
- The Eel (1997), Keiko
- Little Love Song (2019)
- Gunkan Shōnen (2021)
- Bishu: The World's Kindest Clothes (2024), Shizue Tomono
- Silence of the Sea (2024), Botan
- Sasayaki no Kawa (2025)
- Stella Next to Me (2025), Chie Amano

=== TV series ===
- Tokugawa Yoshinobu (1998), Oyoshi
- Fūrin Kazan (2007), Shinome

== Awards and nominations ==
- 1991, won Japan Academy Film Prize for 'Newcomer of the Year' for Isam sozoku (1990), Bakayaro! 3: Henna Yatsura (1990) and Inamura Jane (1990)
- 1992, won Hochi Film Awards for ‘Best Actress’ for Sumo Do, Sumo Don't (1992), Future Memories: Last Christmas (1992) and Okoge (1992)
- 1992, won Nikkan Sports Film Awards for ‘Best New Talent’ for Sumo Do, Sumo Don't (1992), Future Memories: Last Christmas (1992) and Okoge (1992)
- 1993, won Yokohama Film Festival ‘Festival Prize’ for ‘Best Supporting Actress’ for Sumo Do, Sumo Don't (1992), Future Memories: Last Christmas (1992) and Okoge (1992)
- 1993, won Japanese Professional Movie Awards for Sumo Do, Sumo Don't (1992)
- 1993, nominated for Japan Academy Film Prize for 'Best Supporting Actress' for Sumo Do, Sumo Don't (1992)
- 1998, nominated for Japan Academy Film Prize for 'Best Actress’ for The Eel (1997)
