= Sumo Do, Sumo Don't =

- DVD cover for Sumo Do, Sumo Don't (1992)
- Directed by: Masayuki Suo
- Written by: Masayuki Suo
- Produced by: Shōji Masui
- Starring: Masahiro Motoki; Misa Shimizu; Naoto Takenaka
- Cinematography: Naoki Kayano
- Edited by: Junichi Kikuchi
- Music by: Yoshikazu Suo; Sizzle Ohtaka
- Production companies: Cabin Company Ltd. Daiei Studios
- Distributed by: Toho
- Release date: January 15, 1992 (Japan)
- Running time: 103 minutes
- Country: Japan
- Language: Japanese

Sumo Do, Sumo Don't (Japanese: シコふんじゃった。, Hepburn: Shiko funjatta) is a 1992 Japanese film directed by Masayuki Suo. It was chosen as Best Film at the Japan Academy Prize ceremony. It is one of the few notable depictions of sumo in film.

== Plot ==
Kyoritsu University student Shuhei Yamamoto gets a job with his uncle's connection but learns from the supervisor of his graduation thesis, Professor Anayama that he's missing the credits to graduate. The professor makes a deal with Shuhei that if he participates in the tournament for Kyoritsu's sumo club, he would be willing to overlook the missing credits. Shuhei reluctantly accepts at the request of Natsuko Kawamura, a graduate student from the Anayama Lab and a sumo club manager.

The Sumo Club's only member is Aoki Tomio, a traditionalist sumo enthusiast who has repeated years. Shuhei and Aoki struggle to recruit Shuhei's younger brother Haruo and obese Hosaku Tanaka. The amateur team loses at the tournament, and are abused by alumni at the afterparty. Shuhei promises they'll win next, recruiting a British student and experienced footballer George Smiley who joins to save on rent. During the summer vacation, the team visits Anayama's hometown for a training camp. At the end of the camp, the team plays a practice match against elementary schoolers in the neighbourhood.

The team wins the next third league match and replaced the second league. Haruo breaks his arm in the third match, and Shuhei is injured. Masako Mamiya, a female manager with a crush on Haruo, volunteers to join as a member. On the day of the match, Masako binds her chest with bandages and tape but loses. The Sumo Club is inspired by her attempt, with Tanaka and Aoki winning their matches. The team wins the league match in the final round, when Shuhei dramatically throws his opponent out of the ring.

Tanaka is scouted for sumo wrestling, Smiley returns to Britain, Masako and Haruo leave to study abroad in London, and Aoki graduates. Shuhei declines the job offer to continue the sumo club as the sole member. Natsuko visits him in the club, and the movie ends as they playfully practice shiko.

== Cast ==
- Masahiro Motoki as Shuhei Yamamoto
- Misa Shimizu as Natsuko Kawashima
- Naoto Takenaka as Aoki Tomio
- Akira Emoto as Professor Tokichi Anayama
- Kaori Mizushima as Chie Asai
- Hiromasa Taguchi as Hosaku Tanaka
- Robert Hoffman as George Smiley
- Kentarô Sakai
- Masaaki Takarai as Haruo Yamamoto
- Ritsuko Umemoto as Masako Mamiya
- Masaru Matsuda as Tatsuo Horino
- Hiroshi Miyasaka as Hokudo no Ken
- Goro Kataoka as Hayashi
- Naomasa Musaka as Kumota-san (Sumo OB)
- Fuyuki Murakami as Yasujiro Mine (OB-Kai Kaicho)
- Mutsuko Sakura as Yuki Anayama
- Kouichi Oohori

== Reception ==
The film has been described by Japan Times columnist and sumo commentator John Gunning as "well-crafted and at times touching" and he notes that it is virtually the only big-screen sumo film with the exception of the Wakanohana Kanji I biopic Devil of the Dohyō.

=== Awards and nominations ===
16th Japan Academy Prize

- Won: Best Picture
- Won: Best Director - Masayuki Suo
- Won: Best Screenplay - Masayuki Suo
- Won: Best Actor - Masahiro Motoki
- Won: Best Supporting Actor - Naoto Takenaka
- Nominated: Best Supporting Actress - Misa Shimizu
- Nominated: Best Editing - Junichi Kikuchi

==== 14th Yokohama Film Festival Prizes ====
- Won: Best Picture
- Won: Best Actor - Masahiro Motoki
- Won: Best Supporting Actress - Misa Shimizu
- Won: Best Director - Masayuki Suo

== TV series ==
The film was remade as a television series, with Misa Shimizu and Naoto Takenaka reprising their roles, which premiered on Disney+ on October 26, 2022.

The plot remains closely to the original film with the addition of a romantic fumble as part of the catalyst for the character, Ryota Moriyama, to join the sumo club.
