= List of Hello Kitty animated series =

- Hello Kitty
- Hello Kitty in a kimono from Hello Kitty Animation Theater vol.1

ハローキティ (Harō Kiti)
- Created by: Yuko Shimizu; Sanrio
- Original video animation

Hello Kitty and Friends
- Directed by: Yasuo Ishikawa; Masami Hata; Fumio Kurokawa
- Produced by: Takaharu Yoshikawa
- Music by: Senji Nanba
- Studio: Grouper Production
- Licensed by: Kaleidoscope Entertainment, Inc. Family Home Entertainment
- Released: 1989 – 2000
- Episodes: 83
- Original video animation

Hello Kitty's Paradise
- Directed by: Hideaki Oba
- Produced by: Yuki Saito
- Written by: Keiko Kimoto
- Music by: Eri Takeda
- Studio: Imagica; Multi-Access Company
- Licensed by: US: Saban Entertainment
- Released: March 25, 1999 – October 22, 1999
- Runtime: 8–9 minutes (each)
- Episodes: 32
- Original video animation

Growing Up With Hello Kitty
- Directed by: Hiroshi Iwata
- Produced by: Yasuhito Ito; Yuki Saito
- Written by: Chinatsu Hojo
- Music by: Eri Takeda
- Studio: Group TAC
- Released: March 1, 2001 – March 17, 2001
- Runtime: 8–9 minutes (each)
- Episodes: 16
- Original video animation

Hello Kitty's Animation Theater
- Directed by: Yoshio Kuroda
- Written by: Chinatsu Houjou; Miho Maruo; So Toyama; Yumi Kageyama
- Music by: Eri Takeda
- Studio: Group TAC
- Released: July 20, 2001 – December 21, 2001
- Runtime: 25 minutes (each)
- Episodes: 13
- Original video animation

Hello Kitty's Stump Village
- Directed by: Han-Jung-Suk; Soo-Hyun Kim
- Produced by: Chris Eum; Luke Han
- Written by: Ju-Young-Ahn
- Studio: Studio Tomorrow; SOVIK Venture Capital
- Licensed by: NA: Geneon
- Released: May 5, 2005 – October 27, 2005
- Episodes: 26
- Anime television series

Hello Kitty: Ringo no Mori no Fantasy
- Studio: Asahi Production
- Original network: TV Tokyo
- Original run: April 4, 2006 – September 19, 2006
- Episodes: 13

There are several different Hello Kitty animated series, featuring the cartoon character Hello Kitty, from the Japanese company Sanrio.

== Hello Kitty's Furry Tale Theater (1987) ==
Hello Kitty's Furry Tale Theater is a Japanese-American animated series co-produced by DIC Enterprises and MGM Television and animated by Toei Animation. The series featured Hello Kitty and her friends retelling their own versions of popular fairy tales and stories. Each of the 13 half-hour episodes consisted of two 11-minute cartoons, and they first aired on CBS from September 19 to December 12, 1987.

=== Cast ===
- Tara Strong - Hello Kitty
- Elizabeth Hanna - Mama Kitty, Grandma Kitty
- Len Carlson - Papa Kitty
- Carl Banas - Grandpa Kitty
- Sean Roberge - Tuxedo Sam
- Mairon Bennett - My Melody
- Noam Zylberman - Chip
- Cree Summer - Catnip
- Denise Pidgeon - Fangora
- Greg Morton - Grinder
- Fred Savage - Mouser

== Hello Kitty and Friends (1989–2000) ==
SANRIO Animation Series, also known as Sanrio World Masterpiece Cinema Series (サンリオ世界名作映画館シリーズ, Sanrio sekai meisaku eigakan shirīzu), is a series of 83 Japanese OVAs produced between 1989 and 2000, and animated by Grouper Production. 30 of these OVAs (and two Sanrio Anime Festival films) were dubbed in English under the title Hello Kitty and Friends and aired on YTV in Canada. The series featured Hello Kitty and other characters, such as Keroppi, Pochacco, and Pekkle. Episodes were also broadcast on Toon Disney (United States), ZDF and Super RTL (Germany), Boomerang, DeA Kids and Ka-Boom (Italy), Canal de las Estrellas (Mexico), and ABS-CBN (Philippines, under the "Sanrio World of Animation" banner).

=== Episodes (available outside Japan) ===
1. Hello Kitty - Cinderella (22 July 1989)
2. Keroppi - The Big Adventure (27 September 1989)
3. Keroppi - Find the Pink Mushroom (1990)
4. Hello Kitty - The Sleeping Princess (20 July 1991)
5. Hello Kitty - The Circus Comes to Town (21 July 1992)
6. Hello Kitty - The Day the Big Clock Stopped (21 July 1992)
7. Keroppi - Let's Play Baseball (21 July 1992)
8. Hello Kitty - Mom Loves Me After All (21 August 1992)
9. Hello Kitty - The Magic Apple (21 September 1992)
10. Hello Kitty - Santa's Missing Hat (1 November 1992)
11. Keroppi - The Christmas Eve Gift - Santa and His Reindeer Kuppi (1 November 1992)
12. Pekkle - The Great Swimming Race (21 March 1993)
13. Pekkle - Find the Secret Treasure (21 April 1993)
14. Hello Kitty - The Wonderful Sisters (21 May 1993)
15. Keroppi - The Adventures of the Coward Prince (21 May 1993)
16. Hello Kitty - Snow White (21 July 1993)
17. Hello Kitty - Heidi (21 August 1993)
18. Keroppi - The Adventures of Gulliver (21 August 1993)
19. Pekkle - Aladdin and His Magic Lamp (21 September 1993)
20. Pochacco - Exciting Birthday (21 October 1993)
21. Pekkle - The Adventures of Sinbad (21 October 1993)
22. Hello Kitty - Alice in Wonderland (21 November 1993)
23. Keroppi - The Frog's Secret House (21 November 1993)
24. Pochacco - The Excitement at the Carrot Patch (21 November 1993)
25. Hello Kitty - The Dream Thief (21 December 1993)
26. Keroppi - Robin Hood (21 January 1994)
27. Hello Kitty - The Prince in his Dream Castle (12 February 1994)
28. Keroppi - Let's Be Friends (21 February 1994)
29. Keroppi - Our Treasure (21 March 1994)
30. Patty and Jimmy - You're a Superstar (21 March 1994)

=== Cast ===
- Karen Bernstein - Hello Kitty
- Mary Long - Mimmy
- Elizabeth Hanna - Mama
- Paul De La Rosa - Papa
- Judy Orban - Grandma
- Addison Bell - Grandpa
- Jill Frappier - Fifi, Keroppi
- Paulina Gillis - Thomas, Tracy, Pochacco
- Julie Lemieux - Jody, Kyorosuke/Soak, Jimmy
- Tracey Hoyt - Keroleen
- Elva Mai Hoover - Den Den, Noberun/Newton
- Jeff Lumby - Ganta/Junk
- Nadine Rabinovitch - Teru Teru/Ruby
- Chris Wiggins - Kerada, Narrator
- Susan Roman - Pekkle
- Katie Griffin - Patty
- Harvey Atkin
- Kirsten Bishopric
- Anne Butler
- Gina Clayton
- Tony Daniels
- Naz Edwards
- David Fraser
- Catherine Gallant
- Jennifer Griffiths
- Loretta Jafelice
- Hadley Kay
- Kathleen Laskey
- Gordon Masten
- Jonathan Potts
- Tony Robinow
- Rino Romano
- Ron Rubin
- John Stocker
- Claudia Theriault
- Katherine Trowell

== Hello Kitty's Paradise (1999) ==
Kitty's Paradise (Japanese: キティズパラダイス, Hepburn: Kitizu Paradaisu; lit. Kitty's Paradise) is an animated series featuring the adventures of Hello Kitty and her twin sister Mimmy that officially ran from January 5, 1999, to March 29, 2011. The show was the longest-running weekly children's program in TV Tokyo's history, and aired on Tuesday mornings at 7:30 AM JST throughout its 12-year run. Following the series finale, it was immediately replaced by Pretty Rhythm Aurora Dream in its timeslot on April 9, 2011.

Animated shorts were released on video with the Kitty's Paradise brand between March 25 and October 22, 1999. Saban Entertainment adapted these shorts into a TV series in the U.S. titled Hello Kitty's Paradise. This show ran on the Fox Family Channel from March 4 to September 16, 2000. ADV Films licensed the home video rights to this series and initially released it on VHS and DVD between November 26, 2002 and March 25, 2003.

=== Episodes ===
1. A Blooming Good Morning (あさがおさいた)
2. A Storybook Adventure (おはなしをつくろう)
3. Kitty's Clean Cuisine (ごはんはたのしく！)
4. A Day Out with Dad (おみせやさんなにやさん？)
5. Underground Kitty (つちのなかはどうなってるの)
6. Watch the Birdie (キティとミミィとことりさん)
7. Minding Manners (フォークどうする？)
8. Streetwise (まちへおでかけ)
9. The Magic Bags (ふしぎなふくろ)
10. The Dust Monster (ほこりオバケがでてきたぞ)
11. Put On a Happy Place (かざってみよう)
12. The Train to Grandma's House (でんしゃでおでかけ)
13. Paper Play (かみでつくろう)
14. Sizing Things Up (ちょっとといっぱい)
15. The Broken Robot (こわれたロボット)
16. What's in Store (これっていくつ？)
17. Shadow Play (かげであそぼう)
18. Happy Birthday Papa (パパにおてがみ)
19. The Great Kitty Car Race (つみきののりもの)
20. Adventures in Groceryland (おつかいできる？)
21. A Trip to Rainbow Park (なにいろがいいかな)
22. Birthday Party Time (おたんじょうびにおよばれ)
23. Making Cookies (クッキーをつくろう)
24. Great Shapes! (いろんなかたち)
25. A Stitch in Time Saves Nine Lives! (とけいのなかは・・・)
26. The Big and Small of It (おおきい？ちいさい？)
27. A Puzzling Day (かたちであそぼ)
28. A Fair Share (はんぶんこしよう)
29. Can You Count Them? (かぞえられる？)
30. Everything Has Its Place (あそんだあとはもとのばしょ)
31. Once Upon A Kitty (キティとミミィのえほん)
32. A Nice Little Walk in the City (どうろのルール)

=== Cast ===
- Melissa Fahn - Hello Kitty
- Laura Summer - Mimmy
- Jennifer Darling - Mama
- Tony Pope - Papa
- Barbara Goodson - Moley
- Sally/Birdie
- Hally/Flirdie
- Sandy Fox - Tracey Fernando Kitty and Mateo

== Growing Up With Hello Kitty (2001) ==
Together with Hello Kitty (Japanese: ハローキティといっしょ, Hepburn: Harōkiti to Issho) is a series of OVAs by Sanrio featuring Hello Kitty and her twin sister Mimmy as they learn life lessons. The first 16-episode series was released on video between August 21, 1994 and October 21, 1998, while the second 16-episode series was released on video between March 1 and March 17, 2001. AnimEigo released the second series on DVD in 2012 in North America as Growing Up With Hello Kitty, with an English dub by Coastal Studios. Each disc contains six episodes focusing on issues such as learning how to talk on the phone, cleaning up a messy room and playing nicely. The production has been generally well-reviewed, with viewers pleased by both the quality of the production as well as the educational content.

=== Segments ===
1. Going to The Bathroom (トイレにいけるよ)
2. Changing Our Clothes (ひとりできがえ)
3. Eating Nicely (きちんとしょくじ)
4. I Can Share With Friends (がまんできるよ)
5. Sleeping By Ourselves (ひとりでおやすみ)
6. Saying I'm Sorry (ごめんねいえる)
7. Cleaning Up My Mess (おかたづけできる)
8. Replying Properly (きちんとおへんじ)
9. Talking On the Phone (でんわでおはなし)
10. Let's Play Together (なかよくあそぼう)
11. It's Fun to Help (たのしいおてつだい)
12. Eating Our Vegetables (なんでもたべよう)

Undubbed

1. Traffic Safety (こうつうあんぜん)
2. Let's Brush (はみがきしようね)
3. Energetic Greeting (げんきにあいさつ)
4. I Like Bathing (だいすきおふろ)

== Hello Kitty's Animation Theater (2001) ==
Sanrio Anime World Masterpiece Theater (サンリオアニメ世界名作劇場, Sanrio Anime Sekai Meisaku Gekijō) is a 13-episode anime series produced by Sanrio and animated by Group TAC. Each episode features two stories (a 16-minute and an 8-minute story), totalling 26 stories. The episodes aired on TV from July 20 to December 25, 2001 and they were released simultaneously on home video from April 3 to December 21, 2001. It was licensed by ADV Films and released on home video as Hello Kitty's Animation Theater between February 1 and July 12, 2005.

=== Episodes ===
1. Hello Kitty in "Snow White and the Seven Dwarfs" / Badtz-Maru in "The Shepherd Boy and the Wolf"
2. Pochacco in "Jack and the Beanstalk" / Hello Kitty & Mimmy in "The Story of King Midas"
3. Hello Kitty & Dear Daniel in "Hansel & Gretel" / My Melody in "Little Red Riding Hood"
4. Hello Kitty in "The Bamboo Princess" / Hangyodon in "The Emperor's New Clothes"
5. Hello Kitty in "Sleeping Beauty" / Badtz-Maru in "The Ants and the Grasshopper"
6. Hello Kitty in "The Wild Swans" / Monkichi in "Mercury and the Workmen"
7. Hello Kitty in "The Nutcracker" / Corocorokuririn in "The Country Mouse and the Town Mouse"
8. Hello Kitty in "Momotaro" / Pompompurin in "The Tortoise and the Hare"
9. Hello Kitty in "Cinderella" / Pekkle in "Drakestail"
10. Keroppi in "Aladdin and the Magic Lamp" / Hello Kitty in "The Little Match Girl"
11. Hello Kitty in "Puss in Boots" / Pekkle in "The Ugly Duckling"
12. Hello Kitty in "Thumbelina" / Pompompurin in "The North Wind and the Sun"
13. Hello Kitty & Dear Daniel in "The Snow Queen" / Hello Kitty, Mimmy, & Dear Daniel in "The Three Little Pigs"

== Hello Kitty's Stump Village (2005) ==
Hello Kitty's Stump Village is a South Korean-Japanese clay-animated series co-produced in 2005 by Sanrio, SOVIK Venture Capital, and Studio Tomorrow. It was acquired for North American distribution by Geneon and released on DVD with an English dub by Bang Zoom! Entertainment between October 31, 2006, and September 4, 2007. In Japan, the series was released on DVD on April 25, 2007, by Tohokushinsha Film. It later premiered on Cartoon Network in the country on May 3, 2008. In South Korea, the series debuted on Champ on October 1, 2007.

Unlike other series, there is no dialogue in this one. Instead, the narrator tells the events of the episodes.

1. Seesaw Nutcracker
2. Veggie Sunglasses
3. Goodie Town
4. Heart Shaped Fruit
5. Friends Again
6. Strange Penguin
7. Shadow Show
8. Hoop-a-Doop
9. Domino Game
10. Please Come Back
11. Air Balloon
12. Little Twin Stars
13. Kiwi Cars
14. Magical Bowling
15. Grape Juice
16. Mask Party
17. Don't Be Picky
18. Candy Tree
19. Stump Theater
20. Circus
21. Puppet Show
22. Scarecrow
23. Wheat Field
24. Windmill
25. Trick or Treat
26. Keroppi the Frog

== Hello Kitty: Ringo no Mori (2006–2008) ==
Hello Kitty: Ringo no Mori was an anime series divided into three seasons. The seasons are: Hello Kitty: Ringo no Mori no Fantasy (ハローキティ りんごの森のファンタジー), Hello Kitty: Ringo no Mori no Mystery (ハローキティ りんごの森のミステリー) and Hello Kitty: Ringo no Mori to Parallel Town (ハローキティ りんごの森とパラレルタウン). The anime was an Asahi Production.

While this series was never released in English, it received several dubs in Spanish, Valencian, Italian, French, Portuguese, Chinese, Malay, and Arabic.

== The Adventures of Hello Kitty & Friends (2008–2009) ==
The Adventures of Hello Kitty & Friends is a 3D CGI-animated series featuring Hello Kitty and other characters from the Japanese company Sanrio from 2008, co-developed by Sanrio's digital entertainment entity Sanrio Digital and Dream Cortex. It premiered on TVB Jade along with the reboot of The Adventures of Rocky and Bullwinkle and Friends.

== The World of Hello Kitty (2016–2019) ==
The World of Hello Kitty (Portuguese: O Mundo da Hello Kitty) is a 2D flash animated web series of shorts co-produced by Sanrio and the Brazilian animation studio Plot Kids. It started streaming on the Latin American Hello Kitty YouTube channels in 2016 and ended in 2019, lasting 4 seasons with 76 episodes and 19 video clips. The last season was themed to honor the character's 45th birthday. An English-dubbed version began streaming on the Southeast Asian Hello Kitty YouTube channels in April 2020.

This animation has appearances of other Sanrio characters such as Keroppi, Badtz-Maru and Chococat (introduced in the second season), and also My Melody and Little Twin Stars (appearing only in the final season). In 2020, a special season with 6 episodes entitled Hello Kitty & Amigos: Chef Star was released.

== Hello Kitty & Friends – Let's Learn Together (2017) ==
Hello Kitty & Friends – Let's Learn Together (Japanese: キティと一緒に学び、考えていく, Hepburn: Kiti to Issho ni Manabi, Kangaete Iku; lit. Learn and Think with Kitty) is a series of animated educational webshorts by Sanrio that began streaming in Japan on Hikari TV Channel on July 28, 2017. A total of 21 seven-minute episodes were produced. The show was later released on DVD in Japan by Nippon Columbia.

On July 25, 2018, Sentai Filmworks acquired the rights to release the series in the United States, Canada, the United Kingdom, Australia, and New Zealand. An English dubbed version was then released on DVD in November 2018.

The series is aimed at young kids and toddlers.

== Hello Kitty Channel (2018) ==
In August 2018, Sanrio began streaming a CGI-animated web series on YouTube. It features Hello Kitty talking to the camera about her life in the style of vlogging YouTubers.

== Gundam vs Hello Kitty (2019) ==
In January 2019, a limited original net animation series in three episodes entitled Gundam vs Hello Kitty (Japanese: ガンダムvsハローキティ, Hepburn: Gandamu vs harōkiti; lit. Gundam vs Hello Kitty) was launched featuring a crossover between Hello Kitty with the classic 1979 anime series Mobile Suit Gundam. The animation was part of a cross-promotion to commemorate the 40th anniversary of Gundam and the 45th anniversary of Hello Kitty. The episodes were made available on its own YouTube channel with animation made by Sunrise.

== Hello Kitty Fun (2019–2021) ==
Hello Kitty Fun is another 2D flash animated web series of shorts, also exclusive from Hello Kitty's Latin YouTube channels. The series was created as a replacement for The World of Hello Kitty, however, different from the previous one, this series uses a hand-drawn art style, and it has no dialogue. Besides Hello Kitty, no other character has appeared in this series. The series is a production made between Sanrio and the Brazilian animation studio Split Studio.

On the English channel, the series is presented under the name Sweet Moments with Hello Kitty.

== Hello Kitty and Friends Supercute Adventures (2020–present) ==
Hello Kitty and Friends Supercute Adventures is an official, free 2020 animated web series published weekly to the official Hello Kitty and Friends YouTube channel. The first episode aired on Monday, October 26, at 3 pm PST with an all-star cast of Hello Kitty, Keroppi, Badtz-Maru, My Melody, Pompompurin, and Kuromi. In season 2, Chococat and Cinnamoroll joined the main cast, while in season 4, Pochacco joined the cast, in season 8, Dear Daniel joined the cast, and in season 13, the Little Twin Stars, whose names are Kiki and Lala, joined the cast.

=== Main characters ===
- Hello Kitty (voiced by Sarah Anne Williams)
- My Melody (voiced by Michelle Marie)
- Keroppi (voiced by Georgie Kidder)
- Badtz-Maru (voiced by Evette Wulk in seasons 1-9, and Alex Cazares from season 10 onwards)
- Kuromi (voiced by Jenny Yokobori)
- Pompompurin (voiced by Ryan Bartley)
- Chococat (voiced by Michelle Marie)
- Cinnamoroll (voiced by Jenny Yokobori)
- Pochacco (voiced by Jillian Michaels)
- Dear Daniel (voiced by Sonny Onorati)
- Little Twin Stars (voiced by Percy Blythe [Kiki] and Risa Mei [Lala])

=== Supporting characters ===
- Pochi (vocal effects by Sarah Anne Williams)
- Pikki
- Koroppi
- Joey
- Baku (voiced by Sonny Onorati)
- My Sweet Piano
- Mama (hands and voice only, voice actress unknown)
- Tracy
- Tuxedo Sam (voiced by Tiana Camacho)
- Hana-Maru
- Hangyodon
- Pekkle
- Dokidoki Yummychums

=== Episodes ===
1. Perfect Gift (October 26, 2020)
2. Hello-ween (October 28, 2020)
3. Birthday Mess (November 6, 2020)
4. DIY Luck (November 11, 2020)
5. Perfection (November 18, 2020)
6. Happy Family (November 26, 2020)
7. Happy Campers (December 2, 2020)
8. The Claw (December 9, 2020)
9. Hello Kitty Noir (December 16, 2020)
10. Winter Wander-Land (December 23, 2020)
11. Telephone Game (December 30, 2020)
12. Mission Invisible (January 8, 2021)
13. Kuromi's Bad Day (January 13, 2021)
14. Left Out (February 3, 2021)
15. Special Delivery (February 10, 2021)
16. Speedy Sweets (April 14, 2021)
17. Keroppi Faces The Music (April 22, 2021)
18. All Thumbs (April 28, 2021)
19. Hello Kitty's Bake Off (May 5, 2021)
20. My Melody's Tea Party (May 12, 2021)
21. Badtz-Maru's Danger Drone (May 19, 2021)
22. Imperfection (May 26, 2021)
23. Pie In The Sky (June 2, 2021)
24. Fly A Kite (June 9, 2021)
25. Hello Kitty's Bow Chase (June 16, 2021)
26. Kuromi's Sleepover (June 23, 2021)
27. Cinnamoroll's Dance Craze (June 30, 2021)
28. The Wiltening (July 7, 2021)
29. Kuromi Takes The Plunge (July 14, 2021)
30. Dynamic Derby (July 21, 2021)
31. My Melody's Friendship Ultra Blast! (August 25, 2021)
32. My Melody's Wish (September 1, 2021)
33. Keroppi's Mini Mart Madness (September 8, 2021)
34. Happy Napgus, Pompompurin! (September 15, 2021)
35. Hello Kitty's Apple Pie Surprise (September 22, 2021)
36. Badtz-Maru's Manga Mania (September 29, 2021)
37. Hello Kitty's Gameshow Showdown (October 6, 2021)
38. Badtz-Maru's Sweet Beats (October 13, 2021)
39. Kuromi's Perfect Pumpkin (October 20, 2021)
40. My Melody's Mystery Train (October 27, 2021)
41. Kuromi's Night Of The Living Desserts (October 31, 2021)
42. Lost And Found (November 3, 2021)
43. Flowers For Chococat (November 10, 2021)
44. Keroppi's World Record (November 17, 2021)
45. Rainy Day Adventure (November 24, 2021)
46. My Melody's Holiday Plush One (December 22, 2021)
47. Hello Kitty's Mochi Quest (December 29, 2021)
48. Pochacco's Goals (January 5, 2022)
49. My Melody's Mer-Adventure (January 12, 2022)
50. Adventures In Pochi-Sitting (January 19, 2022)
51. Chococat's Mini-Golf Trick Shot (January 26, 2022)
52. My Faire Badtz-Maru (February 2, 2022)
53. Kuromi's Sweet Valentine (February 9, 2022)
54. Give Pompompurin A Break! (February 16, 2022)
55. My Melody's Relax-a-thon (February 23, 2022)
56. Hello Kitty's Overdue (March 2, 2022)
57. Kuromi's Girls Day Toy Hunt (March 9, 2022)
58. Kuromi's Ghost Adventure (March 16, 2022)
59. Pochacco's Super Fun Run (March 23, 2022)
60. Missing April Fool's Day (March 30, 2022)
61. Chococat's Dig Adventure Part 1 (June 2, 2022)
62. Chococat's Dig Adventure Part 2 (June 8, 2022)
63. Kuromi's Escape Room (June 15, 2022)
64. Keroppi's Friday The 13th (June 22, 2022)
65. Pochacco And Thw Blue Ribbon (June 29, 2022)
66. Cinnamoroll Sweetness! (July 6, 2022)
67. Hello Keroppi (July 20, 2022)
68. Bite Sized Badtz-Maru (July 20, 2022)
69. Kuromi's Funhouse (July 27, 2022)
70. Hello Kitty's Kind Capsule (August 3, 2022)
71. My Melody's Tiny Gifts (August 10, 2022)
72. Pompompurin's Road Trip (August 17, 2022)
73. Kuromi's Arcade Antics (August 24, 2022)
74. Chococat Vs. Gravity (August 31, 2022)
75. Hello Kitty's Ramen Round-up (September 7, 2022)
76. Kuromi's Super Spooky Special Part 1 (October 12, 2022)
77. Kuromi's Super Spooky Special Part 2 (October 19, 2022)
78. Kuromi's Super Spooky Special Part 3 (October 26, 2022)
79. My Melody's Bad Day Part 1 (January 18, 2023)
80. My Melody's Bad Day Part 2 (January 25, 2023)
81. My Melody's Bad Day Part 3 (February 1, 2023)
82. Hello Kitty And The Beanstalk Part 1 (February 8, 2023)
83. Hello Kitty And The Beanstalk Part 2 (February 15, 2023)
84. Hello Kitty And The Beanstalk Part 3 (February 22, 2023)
85. Hello Kitty In "Back To My Friends" Part 1 (March 1, 2023)
86. Hello Kitty In "Back To My Friends" Part 2 (March 8, 2023)
87. Hello Kitty In "Back To My Friends" Part 3 (March 15, 2023)
88. Keroppi Town Part 1 (March 22, 2023)
89. Keroppi Town Part 2 (March 29, 2023)
90. Keroppi Town Part 3 (March 31, 2023)
91. Cinnamorollin' With The Crew (May 17, 2023)
92. Kuromi's Internet Auction Mystery (May 24, 2023)
93. Keroppi's Lock-In! (May 31, 2023)
94. Jinx! (June 7, 2023)
95. Kuromi In "Beware The Night Librarian" (June 14, 2023)
96. Hello Kitty, Hello Summer Part 1 (June 21, 2023)
97. Hello Kitty, Hello Summer Part 2 (June 28, 2023)
98. Keroppi's Snail Surprise Part 1 (June 28, 2023)
99. Keroppi's Snail Surprise Part 2 (July 12, 2023)
100. International Friendship Day Part 1 (July 19, 2023)
101. International Friendship Day Part 2 (July 26, 2023)
102. International Friendship Day Part 3 (August 2, 2023)
103. Kuromi's Conspiracy Cruise Part 1 (August 9, 2023)
104. Kuromi's Conspiracy Cruise Part 2 (August 16, 2023)
105. The Kuromi & My Melody Fall Ball (September 20, 2023)
106. Badtz-Maru's Artist Alley Adventures (September 27, 2023)
107. Kuromi's K-Pop Drop Part 1 (October 4, 2023)
108. Kuromi's K-Pop Drop Part 2 (October 11, 2023)
109. Kuromi's Pumpkin Power (October 18, 2023)
110. Kuromi's Midnight Ride (October 25, 2023)
111. Hello Kitty's Boba Birthday (November 1, 2023)
112. Captain Keroppi's Kindness Machine (November 8, 2023)
113. Kuromi's Movie Madness Part 1 (November 15, 2023)
114. Kuromi's Movie Madness Part 2 (November 22, 2023)
115. New Keroppi Part 1 (November 29, 2023)
116. New Keroppi Part 2 (December 6, 2023)
117. Hello Kitty's Holiday Cookie Swap Part 1 (December 13, 2023)
118. Hello Kitty's Holiday Cookie Swap Part 2 (December 20, 2023)
119. My Melody's Snow Day (December 27, 2023)
120. When Hello Kitty And My Melody First Met (April 3, 2024)
121. Hello Kitty's Earth Day Disarray Part 1 (April 10, 2024)
122. Hello Kitty's Earth Day Disarray Part 2 (April 17, 2024)
123. Pompompurin's Birthday Kick-Off (April 24, 2024)
124. Cinnamoroll's Bad Day (May 1, 2024)
125. Hello Kitty's Picture Hunt Surprise (May 8, 2024)
126. A Super New My Melody Moon (May 15, 2024)
127. Kuromi's Splashdown Doom? (May 22, 2024)
128. Hello Kitty's Best Friend's Dinner Party (May 29, 2024)
129. Kuromi's Fancy Pants (June 5, 2024)
130. Hello Kitty's Incredible Race (June 12, 2024)
131. Cinnamoroll's Flight School (June 19, 2024)
132. Kuromi's Burger Rescue (June 26, 2024)
133. Hello Kitty's Summer Camp Adventures (July 3, 2024)
134. Hello Kitty's Bow Stacking Bonanza (August 21, 2024)
135. Cinnamoroll The Champion (August 28, 2024)
136. Would My Melody Rather...? (September 4, 2024)
137. Hello Kitty's Pretty Little Cupcakes Part 1 (September 11, 2024)
138. Hello Kitty's Pretty Little Cupcakes Part 2 (September 18, 2024)
139. Pompompurin's Desert Dessert (September 25, 2024)
140. Kuromi's Which Witch (October 2, 2024)
141. Kuromi's Kawaii Haunted House (October 9, 2024)
142. Professor Kuromi's School Of Autumn (October 16, 2024)
143. My Melody And Kuromi's Fall Feast (October 23, 2024)
144. Kuromi's Golden Jack-O-Lanterns (October 30, 2024)
145. Hello Kitty's Dear, Dear Daniel (November 6, 2024)
146. Hello Kitty's Kindness Challenge (November 13, 2024)
147. Hello Kitty's Holiday Pajama Party (December 11, 2024)
148. Pompompurin Drops The Ball Part 1 (December 18, 2024)
149. Pompompurin Drops The Ball Part 2 (December 24, 2024)
150. My Melody's Photo Frenzy (January 1, 2025)
151. Kuromi, What's In Your Bag? (January 8, 2025)
152. Cinnamoroll's Top Battle (January 15, 2025)
153. Pompompurin's Cozy Holiday (January 22, 2025)
154. Cinnamoroll's Cloud Candy (January 29, 2025)
155. Hello Kitty's Galentine's Surprise (February 5, 2025)
156. Pochacco's Beach Day (February 12, 2025)
157. Pochacco's Birthday Part 1 (February 19, 2025)
158. Pochacco's Birthday Part 2 (February 26, 2025)
159. Pochacco's Super Rad Workout (March 5, 2025)
160. Hello Kitty's Holiday Kindness Parade (March 12, 2025)
161. Balloon Race (September 24, 2025)
162. Kuromi And Pochacco's Fortune Comes True (October 1, 2025)
163. Kuromi's Hayride Surprise (October 8, 2025)
164. Kuromi's Spooky Storytime Part 1 (October 15, 2025)
165. Kuromi's Spooky Storytime Part 2 (October 22, 2025)
166. Kuromi's Ghosts In Space (October 29, 2025)
167. Elementary, My Dear Pompompurin (November 5, 2025)
168. Cinnamoroll's School Of Cool (November 12, 2025)
169. My Melody's Origami Adventures (November 19, 2025)
170. Hello Kitty's Joy Of Cleaning (November 26, 2025)
171. Keroppi's Singing Texts (December 3, 2025)
172. Magical Girl Hello Kitty (December 10, 2025)
173. Hello Kitty's Ice Skating Show (December 17, 2025)
174. Badtz-Maru's Pals-of-Mine Day (February 11, 2026)
175. Lunar New Year Pop-up (February 18, 2026)
176. Hello Kitty's Picnic (February 25, 2026)
177. Hello Kuromi's Cloud Companions (March 4, 2026)
178. Pompompurin's Pie Surprise (March 11, 2026)
179. My Melody's Super Good Day (March 18, 2026)
180. Dance Duo Friends (March 25, 2026)
181. Hello Kitty's River Ramen (April 1, 2026)
182. Pompompurin's Curry Cook Off (April 8, 2026)
183. Pompompurin And The Blanket Fort (April 15, 2026)
184. Pompompurin Takes On Twins Day (April 22, 2026)
185. Hello Kitty's Garage Band (April 29, 2026)
186. Stargazing With Kiki And Lala Part 1 (May 6, 2026)
187. Stargazing With Kiki And Lala Part 2 (May 13, 2026)
188. Chococat's Flower Frenzy (September 2, 2026)
189. Tuxedosam's Fashion Show (September 9, 2026)
190. Rocket Chococat Part 1 (September 16, 2026)
191. Rocket Chococat Part 2 (September 23, 2026)
192. Keroppi's Rapid Ramen Recipe (September 30, 2026)
193. The Little Twin Cars (October 7, 2026)
194. My Melody's Five Challenges (October 14, 2026)
195. Hangyodon's Fortunes (October 21, 2026)
196. Kuromi's All Year Halloween (October 28, 2026)
197. Puddin' Boss Pompompurin (November 4, 2026)
198. Keroppi Cares! (November 11, 2026)
199. Kuromi's Sky Pirates Part 1 (November 18, 2026)

== Hello Kitty: Super Style! (2022–2024) ==
Hello Kitty: Super Style! is a CGI animated show which began streaming on Amazon Kids+ in December 2022. The series consists of 12 seasons and 52 episodes in total. The series is a French and Italian co-production. The theme song is performed by Carly Rae Jepsen.

== Hello Kitty and Friends Supercute Adventures: A Day in the Life with Kuromi (2026–present) ==
Hello Kitty and Friends Supercute Adventures: A Day in the Life with Kuromi is an official, free 2026 animated spin-off web series of Hello Kitty and Friends Supercute Adventures published two days a week to the official Hello Kitty and Friends YouTube channel. The first episode aired on Monday, October 2, at 5 pm PST with an all-star cast of Kuromi, Baku, and Gureco.

=== Main characters ===
- Kuromi (voiced by Jenny Yokobori)
- Baku (voiced by Doug Erholtz)
- Gureco (voiced by Jewels Aguirre)

=== Supporting characters ===
- Badtz-Maru (voiced by Alex Cazares)
- Keroppi (voiced by Georgie Kidder)
- Pompompurin (voiced by Ryan Bartley)
- My Melody
- Dear Daniel
- Dokidoki Yummychums
- Hello Kitty (voiced by Sarah Anne Williams)

=== Episodes ===
1. Hungry Plant (October 2, 2026)
2. The Joy Of Missing Out (October 6, 2026)
3. Flying Fiasco (October 9, 2026)
4. Double Trouble Part 1 (October 13, 2026)
5. Double Trouble Part 2 (October 16, 2026)
6. Baku's Meltdown (October 20, 2026)
7. Musical Hunt (October 23, 2026)
8. Kuromi's Epic Birthday Marathon (October 27, 2026)
9. Rabbit On The Moon (October 30, 2026)
10. Hiccups In The Plan (October 31, 2026)
11. Sleepwalker (November 6, 2026)
12. A Totally Normal And Relaxing Day For Kuromi (November 13, 2026)
13. The Spark (November 20, 2026)
