= Music Fair =

- Presented by: see #Hosts
- Country of origin: Japan

Production
- Production location: Tokyo International Forum (2008-present)
- Running time: 30 minutes
- Production company: Fuji Television

Original release
- Network: FNS (Fuji TV)
- Release: 31 August 1964 – present

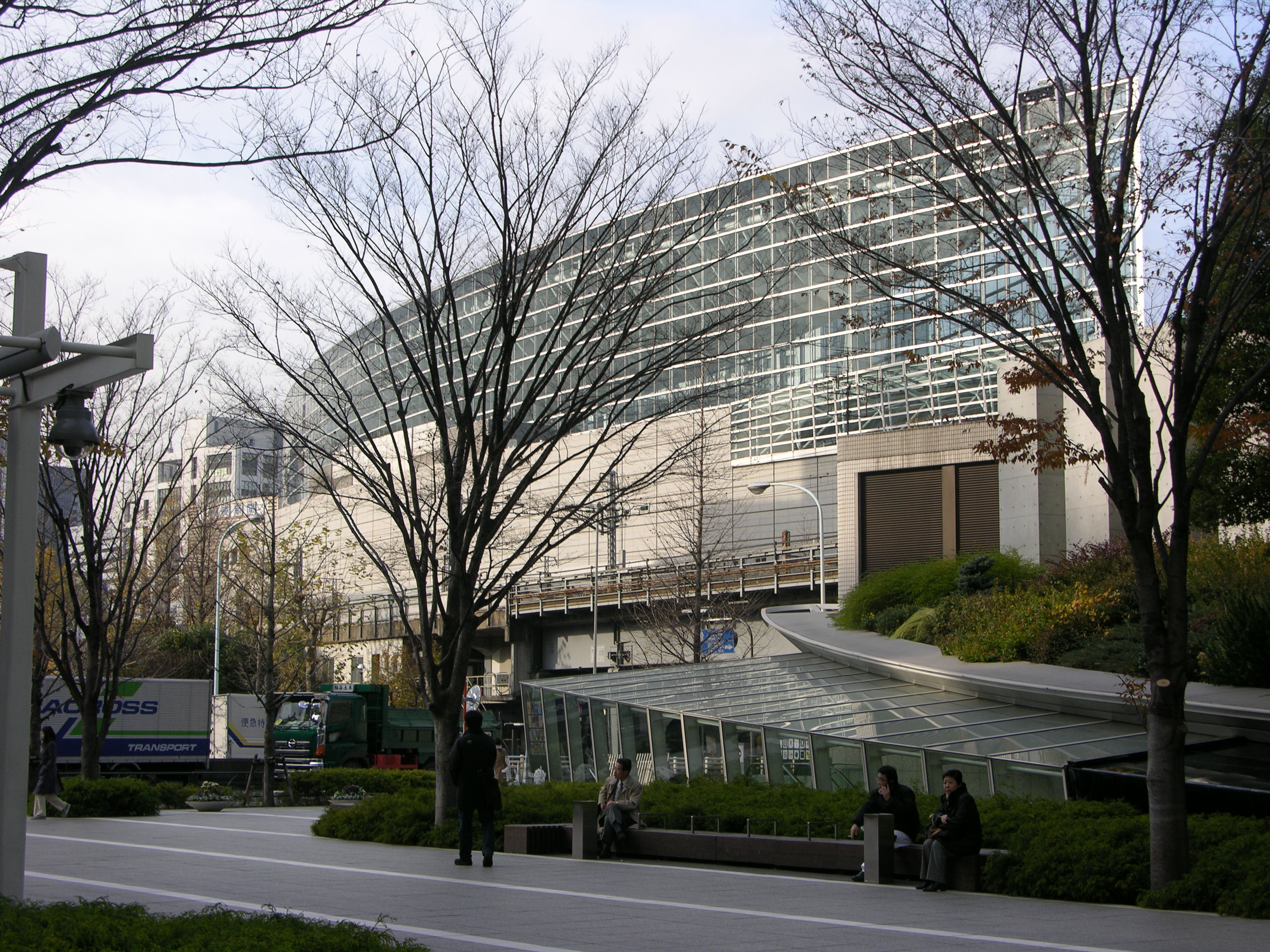
Tokyo International Forum. Japan.

Music Fair (ミュージックフェア) is a Japanese music show. It is broadcast by Fuji Television. The shows started in 1964 and it is the longest-running Japanese music show and is sponsored by Shinogi Healthcare, a subsidiary of Shionogi.

As of 2025, it is considered one of the longest-running music shows in Japan. Its main theme is music, having created many competitions and collaborations unique to the program, resulting in not only song, but also dance and musical performance. And between performances, the program has a talk corner where the guests talk about different themes, including "Memories of Music Fair," "What I Want to ask at Music Fair," and "Turning Points in My Life." Musical guests are not only from Japan, but also from overseas.

== History ==
"Shionogi Music Fair", known commonly as "Music Fair", started in August 1964.

It has been sponsored by Shionogi since its inception until 2015, when the company transferred its consumer healthcare into a separate wholly owned subsidiary known as Shinogi Healthcare.

The program started in black and white, changed to color in 1967, audio modified to stereo in 1978, turned from analog to digital (high definition) in 2004. It started airing Mondays at 21:00 and has changed air time and day a total of 5 times, until 2001, where it has remained until now, Saturdays at 18:00.

By March 2024, it had aired 3000 programs, and was recognized by Guinness World Records as the world's longest weekly music TV program (59 years, 184 days, as of March 2, 2024).

In January 2025, due to the Fuji Television - Masahiro Nakai scandal, Shionogi has considered removing their name from the program.

== Hosts ==
- Fubuki Koshiji (1964)
- Sachiko Hidari (1965)
- Yōko Minamida & Hiroyuki Nagato (1965-1981)
- Tomoko Hoshino (1982-1988)
- Yuko Kotegawa (1988-1995)
- Anju Suzuki (1995–2016)
- Toshiaki Megumi (2001–2016)
- Yukie Nakama & Shin'ichi Karube (2016–Present)

== Foreign Performers ==
- Beyoncé
- Amy Holland
- ABBA
- Ariana Grande
- Leona Lewis
- Mariah Carey
- Roxette
- Shania Twain
- TVXQ
- Halcali
- Destiny's Child
- The Pussycat Dolls
- Kelly Clarkson
- Taylor Swift
- Jejung & Yuchun
- Eric Carmen
- Olivia Newton-John
- Spice Girls
- Teresa Teng
- Madonna
- Pentatonix
- IZ*ONE
- Onew

== See also ==
- FNS Music Festival
- Hey! Hey! Hey! Music Champ
