= 2016 in Japanese television =

Events in 2016 in Japanese television.

== Events ==
Date	Event
October 9	The 2016 Formula One World Championship will be held at 2016 Japanese Grand Prix.
October 16	The 2016 MotoGP World Championship will be held at 2016 Japanese motorcycle Grand Prix.

== Ongoing ==
Show	Type	Channel	First Aired	Source
AKB48 Show!	Variety Show, Music	BS Premium, NHK World Premium	October 5, 2013	
AKBingo!	Variety Show	Nippon Television	October 1, 2008	
Dragon Ball Super	Anime	Fuji Television	July 5, 2015	
Naruto Shippuden	Anime	TV Tokyo	February 15, 2007	
Nodojiman	Talent Show	NHK-G, NHK World Premium	March 15, 1953 (TV)	
Music Fair	Music	Fuji Television	August 31, 1964	
Sazae-san	Anime	Fuji Television	October 5, 1969	
FNS Music Festival	Music	Fuji Television	July 2, 1974	
Panel Quiz Attack 25	Game-Show	TV Asahi	April 6, 1975	
Okaasan to Issho	Kids	E-TV, NHK World Premium	October 5, 1959	
Soreike! Anpanman	Anime	Nippon Television	October 3, 1988	
Downtown no Gaki no Tsukai ya Arahende!!	Game-Show	Nippon Television	October 3, 1989	
Crayon Shin-chan	Anime	TV Asahi	April 13, 1992	
Nintama Rantarō	Anime	NHK	April 10, 1993	
Chibi Maruko-chan	Anime	Fuji Television	January 8, 1995	
Detective Conan	Anime	NNS	January 8, 1996	
SASUKE	Sports	Tokyo Broadcasting System	August 26, 1997	
Ojarumaru	Anime	NHK	October 5, 1998	
One Piece	Anime	Fuji Television	October 20, 1999	
Doraemon	Anime	TV Asahi	April 15, 2005	
Yu-Gi-Oh! Arc-V	Anime	TV Tokyo	April 6, 2014	
Yo-kai Watch	Anime	TV Tokyo	January 8, 2014	

== Ending ==
End date	Show	Channel	First Aired	Source
January 31	Go! Princess PreCure	TV Asahi	February 1, 2015	
February 7	Shuriken Sentai Ninninger	TV Asahi	February 22, 2015	
March 15	NHK Kayou Concert	NHK	March 12, 1994	
March 16	KonoSuba	Tokyo MX	January 14, 2016	
March 25	Gate: Jieitai Kano Chi nite, Kaku Tatakaeri	Tokyo MX	July 4, 2015	
March 26	Durarara!!×2	Tokyo MX	January 10, 2015	
March 26	Tetsujin 28-go Gao!	Fuji Television	April 6, 2013	
March 26	Fairy Tail (2nd Series)	TV Tokyo	April 5, 2014	
March 27	Brave Beats	TV Asahi	October 11, 2015	
March 29	Ariyoshi AKB Kyōwakoku	Tokyo Broadcasting System	March 30, 2010	
March 30	Gintama°	TV Tokyo	April 8, 2015	
March 30	Musaigen no Phantom World	Tokyo MX	January 6, 2016	
March 31	Aikatsu!	TV Tokyo	October 8, 2012	
March 31	Dagashi Kashi	Tokyo Broadcasting System	January 7, 2016	
March 31	Poco Potteito (Segment from With Mother)	NHK	March 28, 2011	
April 1	Bitworld	NHK World Premium	April 6, 2007	
April 1	Hook Book Row	NHK	March 28, 2011	
April 2	Asa ga Kita	NHK	September 28, 2015	
April 3	World Trigger	TV Asahi	October 5, 2014	
April 3	Music Japan	NHK	April 7, 2007	
April 10	Cardfight!! Vanguard G GIRS Crisis	TV Tokyo	October 11, 2015	
June 20	Hundred	TV Tokyo	April 4, 2016	
June 22	Busujima Yuriko no Sekirara Nikki	Tokyo Broadcasting System	April 20, 2016	
June 29 & 30	AKB48 no Anta, Dare?	NOTTV	April 2, 2012	
July 1 (TV)	Sakamoto Desu ga?	Tokyo Broadcasting System	April 8, 2016	
September 18	Re:Zero	TV Tokyo	April 3, 2016	
September 20	Masou Gakuen HxH (Season 1)	Tokyo MX	July 5, 2016	
September 24	Qualidea Code	Tokyo MX	July 9, 2016	
September 25	Kamen Rider Ghost	TV Asahi	October 4, 2015	
September 25	Macross Δ	Tokyo MX	April 3, 2016	
September 27	Keyabingo! (Season 1)	Nippon Television	July 11, 2016	
October 1	Toto Neechan	NHK	April 4, 2016	
October 27	Pocket Monsters XYZ	TV Tokyo	October 29, 2015	
December 18	Sanada Maru	NHK	January 10, 2016	
December 23	JoJo's Bizarre Adventure: Diamond is Unbreakable	Tokyo MX, Crunchyroll	April 1, 2016	
December 24	Ultraman Orb	TV Tokyo	July 9, 2016	
December 26	SMAP×SMAP	Fuji Television	April 15, 1996	
December 26	Nogibingo! 7	Nippon Television	October 10, 2016	

== New Series & Returning Shows ==
Show	Network	First Aired	Finale	Status	Source
Musaigen no Phantom World	Tokyo MX, Crunchyroll	January 6	March 30	Ended	
Dagashi Kashi	TBS, Crunchyroll	January 7	March 31	Ended	
Fairy Tail Zero	TV Tokyo, Crunchyroll	January 9	March 26	Ended	
Sanada Maru	NHK-G, NHK World Premium	January 10	December 18	Ended	
KonoSuba	Tokyo MX, Crunchyroll	January 14	March 16	Season Ended	
Maho Girls PreCure!	TV Asahi	February 7	January 29, 2017	Ended	
Doubutsu Sentai Zyuohger	TV Asahi	February 14	February 5, 2017	Ended	
JoJo's Bizarre Adventure: Diamond is Unbreakable	Tokyo MX, Crunchyroll	April 1	December 23	Ended	
Macross Δ	Tokyo MX	April 3	September 25	Ended	
Re:Zero	TV Tokyo	April 3	September 19	Season Ended	
Boku no Hero Academia	Japan News Network	April 3	June 26	Season Ended	
Toto Neechan	NHK-G, NHK World Premium	April 4	October 1	Ended	
Galapico Poo (Segment from With Mother)	NHK, NHK World Premium	April 4	Currently Airing	Continues 2017	
Hundred	TV Tokyo	April 4	June 20	Ended	
Beyblade: Burst	TV Tokyo	April 4		Continues 2017	
Sailor Moon Crystal - Season III	Tokyo MX, Crunchyroll	April 4	June 27	Season Ended	
Aikatsu Stars!	TV Tokyo	April 7	Currently Airing	Continues 2017	
Sakamoto Desu ga?	Tokyo Broadcasting System	April 8	October 26 (DVD Release)	Ended (TV)	
Kabaneri of the Iron Fortress	Fuji Television	April 8	July 1	Ended	
Nogibingo! 6	Nippon Television	April 11	June 28	Season Ended	
Utacon	NHK-G, NHK World Premium	April 12	Currently Airing	Continues 2017	
Banana Zero Music	NHK-G, NHK World Premium	April 16		Continues 2017	
Cardfight!! Vanguard G: Stride Gate	TV Tokyo	April 17	September 25	Ended	
Busujima Yuriko no Sekirara Nikki	Tokyo Broadcasting System	April 20	June 22	Ended	
AKB Love Night Koi Koujou	TV Asahi	April 20	September 21	Ended	
Kamiwaza Wanda	TBS	April 23	March 25, 2017	Season Ended	
Love Live! Sunshine!!	Tokyo MX	July 2	September 24	Season Ended	
Masou Gakuen HxH	Tokyo MX	July 5	September 20	Season Ended	
Keyabingo!	Nippon Television	July 5	September 26	Season Ended	
Fate/kaleid liner Prisma Illya 3rei!	Tokyo MX	July 6	September 21	Season Ended	
This Art Club Has a Problem!	Tokyo Broadcasting System	July 7	September 29	Ended	
Ultraman Orb	TV Tokyo	July 9	December 24	Ended	
Qualidea Code	Tokyo MX	July 10	September 24	Ended	
Heybot!	TV Asahi	September 18	September 24, 2017	Ended 2017	
Kamen Rider Ex-Aid	TV Asahi	October 2	August 27, 2017	Ended	
Cardfight!! Vanguard G: NEXT	TV Tokyo	October 2		Continues 2017	
Show By Rock!!#	Tokyo MX	October 2	December 18	Ended	
Idol Memories	Tokyo MX	October 2	December 18	Ended	
Beppinsan	NHK-G, NHK World Premium	October 3	April 1, 2017	Ended	
Jimi ni Sugoi! Kōetsu Girl: Kouno Etsuko	NTV, Hulu	October 5	December 7	Ended	
Keijo!!!!!!!!	Tokyo MX	October 6	December 22	Ended	
Haikyū!! Karasuno Kōkō VS Shiratorizawa Gakuen Kōkō	MBS	October 8	December 10	Ended	
Nogibingo! 7	Nippon Television	October 11	December 27	Season Ended	
Kyabasuka Gakuen	Nippon Television	October 29	December 24	Ended	
Pokémon Sun & Moon	TV Tokyo	November 17	Currently Airing	Continues 2017	

== Sports ==
Airdate	Sports	Network	Source
October 6	2016 Formula One World Championship	Fuji TV Next	
October 16	2016 MotoGP World Championship	G+	

== Special Events ==
Airdate	Show	Type	Network	Source
January 3	Domoto Kyodai: New Year's Special 2016	Music	Fuji Television	
January 11	NHK Nodojiman Champion Taikai - 70th Anniversary	Talent Show	NHK-G and World Premium	
January 16	AKB48 Show! #100 "100th Episode Special"	Milestone Special	BS Premium and NHK World Premium	
January 22	Nogizaka46 Show! Kouhaku Special	Variety Show, Special	BS Premium	
February 7	MJ Presents: 15th Anniversary Celebration! Nana Mizuki 77 Minute Special Live! ~Complete~	Special	BS Premium	
February 11	Nogizaka46 Show! Kouhaku Special ~Extended Version~	Variety Show, Special	BS Premium	
March 21	MJ Presents: Ikimonogakari no 10nengakari	Special	NHK-G and World Premium	
March 28	MJ Presents: Chatmonthy Festival ~10th Anniversary~	Special	NHK-G and World Premium	
April 3	MJ Presents: Babymetal Revolution (Music Japan last episode)	Special, Series Finale	NHK-G and World Premium	
June 14	PriPara #100 "Tension 100 MAX!"	Milestone Special	TV Tokyo	
June 14 & 21	AKBingo! Bad Boys' Graduation Special Edition	Special	Nippon Television	
June 25	AKB48 Show Presents: The Girls on the Borderline	Special	BS Premium and NHK World Premium	
July 16	Ongaku no Hi 2016	Special	Tokyo Broadcasting System	
July 17	One Piece #750 "A Desperate Situation! Luffy Fights a Battle in Extreme Heat!"	Milestone Special	Fuji Television	
July 18	FNS 2016 Uta no Natsu Matsuri	Special	Fuji Television	
July 23 & 24	FNS 27 Hour TV	Telethon	Fuji Television	
July 26	AKBingo! #400 "Fate Battle!"	Milestone Special	Nippon Television	
August 27 & 28	24-Hour Television 2016	Charity	Nippon Television	
September 11	Doubutsu Sentai Zyuohger #29; Super Sentai 2,000th Episode: Champion of the Champions	Milestone Special	TV Asahi	
September 18	Kochikame 40th Anniversary Special; "THE FINAL! The Last Day of Ryotsu Kankichi"	Special	Fuji Television	
September 19	Music Station Ultra Fes 2016 - 30th Anniversary	Special	TV Asahi	
October 21	AKB48 A to Z 2016	Documentary	BS Premium and NHK World Premium	
October 22	Super Premium AKB48 Fes 2016	Live Concert, Special	BS Premium and NHK World Premium	
November 13	Animelo Summer Live 2016: Toki - Day 1 Part 1	Live Concert	BS Premium	
November 20	Animelo Summer Live 2016: Toki - Day 1 Part 2	Live Concert	BS Premium	
November 27	Animelo Summer Live 2016: Toki - Day 2 Part 1	Live Concert	BS Premium	
December 4	Animelo Summer Live 2016: Toki - Day 2 Part 2	Live Concert	BS Premium	
December 7	2016 FNS Music Festival - Day 1	Music, Special	Fuji Television	
December 11	Animelo Summer Live 2016: Toki - Day 3 Part 1	Live Concert	BS Premium	
December 14	2016 FNS Music Festival - Day 2	Music, Special	Fuji Television	
December 16	Domoto Kyodai: Christmas Special 2016	Music	Fuji Television	
December 18	Animelo Summer Live 2016: Toki - Day 3 Part 2	Live Concert	BS Premium	
December 23	Music Station Super Live 2016	Special	TV Asahi	
December 30	58th Japan Record Awards	Special	Tokyo Broadcasting System	
December 31	67th NHK Kōhaku Uta Gassen	Special	NHK-G and World Premium	
December 31	Johnny's Countdown 2016-17	Special	Fuji Television	

== Deaths ==
Date	Name	Age	Notability	Source
April 3	Kōji Wada	42	Singer from Digimon franchise. His last single released prior his death was "Seven ~tri ver.~", released March 30.	
April 12	Tōru Ōhira	86	Narrator and voice actor, known for his role of Dr. Kozaburo Nambu in Science Ninja Team Gatchaman and its sequel Gatchaman II, and his narration of the Super Sentai series (1975-1983, 1992, 1995) and several of the Metal Hero series; also provided the Japanese dub voices of Darth Vader, Fred Flintstone, Homer Simpson, and Clark Kent/Superman in the Adventures of Superman	
May 2	Tomohiro Matsu	43	Light Novel writer	
May 17	Yuko Mizutani	51	Voice actress; her latest role was Ikuko Tsukino, in Sailor Moon Crystal	
October 9	Michiyuki Kawashima	47	Japanese musician and lead vocals/guitars from Boom Boom Satellites.	
October 10	Kazunari Tanaka	49	Voice actor, most known in Haikyu!!	

== See also ==
- 2016 in anime
- 2016 in Japan
- 2016 in Japanese music
- List of Japanese films of 2016
