= Hirofumi Arai =

Zainichi Korean actor (born 1979)

- 新井浩文
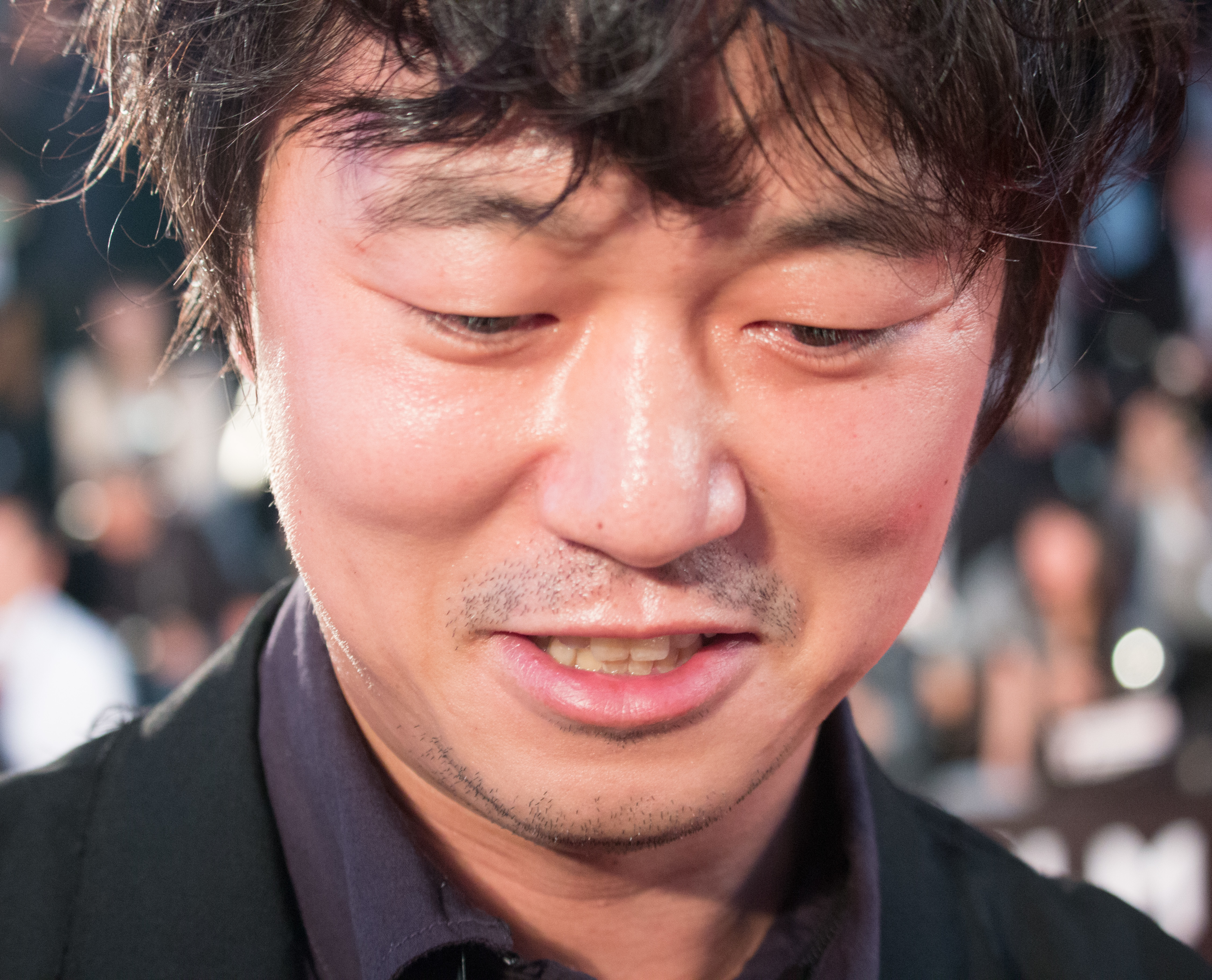
- Arai at the 28th Tokyo International Film Festival in 2015
- Born: Park Kyung-bae (박경배); January 18, 1979 (age 47); Hirosaki, Aomori, Japan
- Citizenship: Chōsen-seki (until 2005); South Korea (since 2005)
- Occupation: Actor
- Years active: 2001–2019

Korean name
- Hangul: 박경배
- Hanja: 朴慶培
- RR: Bak Gyeongbae
- MR: Pak Kyŏngbae

Park Kyung-bae (born January 18, 1979), professionally known by his Japanese alias Hirofumi Arai (新井 浩文, Arai Hirofumi) is a Zainichi South Korean former actor.

== Career ==
Arai made his screen debut in Isao Yukisada's Go in 2001 when he was 22 years old. His next film role was the emotionally disturbed senior high school student Aoki in Toshiaki Toyoda's Blue Spring, which won him the Best New Actor award at the 17th Takasaki Film Festival.

In 2011, Arai co-starred as Detective Kazuhiko Soga in a one-off TV crime thriller Douki with co-stars Ryuhei Matsuda as Detective Ryota Udagawa and Chiaki Kuriyama as Michiru Soga.

The June 2012 issue of Switch, a Japanese arts and media magazine, features a special segment on top ten manga that teaches love and passion, chosen by Japanese actors, artists and musicians including Arai, who chose Bakuman while explaining: "You should up your girl power by learning how to behave like a heroine."

Arai was represented by Anore Inc., a talent agency founded in 1996 by actor Tadanobu Asano, Asano's father Yukihisa Sato and Asano's musician brother Kujun Sato.

The talent agency terminated his contract shortly after Arai's arrest on February 1, 2019.

== Personal life ==
Arai had stated in a number of Japanese interviews that he has a continual interest in being involved with films that explore Korean-Japanese issues.

Tokyograph announced in 2007 that Arai entered a "serious relationship" with singer Miu Sakamoto, the eldest daughter of noted musician Ryuichi Sakamoto and singer-songwriter Akiko Yano, after meeting during a television talk show in 2006.

== Arrest ==
On February 1, 2019, Arai was arrested for sexual assault involving rape of an outcall masseuse on July 1, 2018 by the Tokyo Metropolitan Police Department. On February 21, 2019, he was indicted by the Tokyo District Public Prosecutors Office. On December 2, 2019, Arai was sentenced to five years in prison.

On December 25, 2019, Arai's lawyer requested bail from the Tokyo District Court. On December 27, the Tokyo District Court decided to grant bail, and Arai paid a bail deposit of 5 million yen.

On November 17, 2020, the sentence was reduced to four years in prison due to the actor paying a settlement of 3 million yen (about US$29,000) to the victim.

== Filmography ==
=== Film ===
Year	Title	Other titles	Director	Notes
2001	Blue Spring	Aoi haru	Toshiaki Toyoda	Based on Taiyō Matsumoto's manga, sets in a run-down all-boys school where violence and apathy rule the roost.
2001	Go		Yukisada Isao	Based on Kazuki Kaneshiro's coming-of-age novel, Go.
2002	Justice		Yukisada Isao	(short film)
2003	Josee, the Tiger and the Fish	ジョゼと虎と魚たち; Joze to Tora to Sakanatachi	Isshin Inudo	Based on Seiko Tanabe's novel.
2004	Heaven's Bookstore	天国の本屋～恋火; Tengoku no honya	Tetsuo Shinohara	Based on Atsushi Matsuhisa and Wataru Tanaka's novel.
2004	Loved Gun	ラブドガン; Rabudo gan	Kensaku Watanabe	
2004	69 sixtynine		Sang-il Lee	Based on Ryu Murakami's semi-autobiographical novel, 69.
2004	Blood and Bones	血と骨; Chi to Hone	Yoichi Sai	Based on Yan Sogiru's semi-autobiographical novel.
2005	Neighbour No. 13	隣人13号; Rinjin 13 Gou	Yasuo Inoue	Based on Santa Inoue's 3-volume dark psychological thriller manga.
2005	The Whispering of the Gods	ゲルマニウムの夜 Gerumaniumu no Yoru (Germanium's Night)	Tatsushi Ōmori	Based on Mangetsu Hanamura's novel. Rou (Arai) returns to his childhood home, a monastery of a tight-knit Christian community, where he soon forces them to face its dark brutal past.
2006	Sway	ゆれる Yureru	Miwa Nishikawa	A courtroom drama that revolves around fraternal rivalry that ends with the murder of a childhood friend.
2007	The Matsugane Potshot Affair	松ヶ根乱射事件; Matsugane Ransha Jiken	Nobuhiro Yamashita	Based on Ryūnosuke Akutagawa's crime novel.
2008	A Crowd of Three	(ケンタとジュンとカヨちゃんの国; Kenta to Jun to Kayo-chan no Kuni	Tatsushi Ōmori	a.k.a. Kenta, Jun And Kayo-chan's Country
2008	My Darling of the Mountains	Yama no Anata ~Tokuichi no Koi~ (Beyond the Mountains: Tokuichi in Love)	Katsuhito Ishii	A remake of Hiroshi Shimizu’s 1938 film The Masseurs and a Woman.
2009	The Blood of Rebirth	Yomigaeri no Chi	Toshiaki Toyoda	
2009	The Crab Cannery Ship	Kanikōsen	Hiroyuki Tanaka	Based on Takiji Kobayashi's 1929 politically satirical novella.
2009	The Wonderful World of Captain Kuhio	Kuhio Taisa (Captain Kuhio)	Daihachi Yoshida	Based on Kazumasa Yoshida’s 2006 biographical novel Kekkon Sagishi Kuhio Taisa (Marriage Swindler: Captain Kuhio).
2009	224466		Tadanobu Asano	Part of R246 Story, a film anthology that revolves around Japan's 76-mile highway, Route 246. Other R246 Story short films: CLUB246 (Ilmari), Jiroru: Densetsu no Yo-na-o-shi (Shido Nakamura), Bento Fufu (Yūsuke Santamaria), Arifureta Kisho (Genki Sudo), Dead Noise (Verbal).
2009	Villon's Wife	ヴィヨンの妻; Viyon no Tsuma	Kichitaro Negishi	Based on Osamu Dazai's 1947 semi-autobiographical short story.
2009	Mt. Tsurugidake	劒岳 点の記; Tsurugidake Ten no Ki	Daisaku Kimura	Based on Jirō Nitta's historical novel.
2010	Douki (TV movie)	同期 (Synchronization)	Yu Irie	Detective Ryouta Udagawa (Ryuhei Matsuda) searches for his rival colleague Kazuhiko Soga (Hirofumi Arai) who went missing after a murder.
2010	Love & Loathing & Lulu & Ayano	(名前のない女たち; Namae no Nai Onnatachi (Nameless Women)	Hisayasu Satō	Based on Atsuhiko Nakamura's memoir on how she was roped into working in Japan's porn industry.
2010	A Yakuza's Daughter Never Cries	Doch yakudzy Yakuza Girl	Sergei Bodrov	
2010	Confessions	告白; Kokuhaku	Tetsuya Nakashima	Based on Kanae Minato's 2008 novel.
2010	All Around Us	ぐるりのこと; Gururi no Koto (What's All Round Us)	Ryōsuke Hashiguchi	
2010	BOX: The Hakamada Case - What's Life?	BOX 袴田事件 命とは; BOX: Hakamada jiken - inochi towa	Banmei Takahashi	Based on the Hakamada Incident, a real-life event that inspires former magistrate Norimichi Kumamoto's nationwide campaign to save a man who was sentenced to Japan's Death Row for murdering a family of four in 1966.
2011	That's the Way!! A Film Starring Fujio Akatsuka	これでいいのだ!! 映画★赤塚不二夫; Korede iinoda!! Eiga★Akatsuka Fujio	Hideaki Sato	Based on the life of manga artist Fujio Akatsuka.
2011	Slapstick Brothers	漫才ギャング; Manzai gyangu (Manzai Gang)	Hiroshi Shinagawa	
2011	Hara-Kiri: Death of a Samurai	一命; Ichimei (one life)	Takashi Miike	A 3D remake of Masaki Kobayashi's 1962 film Harakiri.
2011	Seiji: House 475	セイジ 陸の魚; Seiji: Riku no Sakana	Yûsuke Iseya	Based on Tomoki Tsujiuchi's novel, Seiji. In 2012, House 475 was retitled and re-released as Seiji: Riku no Uo (Seiji: Fish on Land).
2011	Love Strikes!	モテキ; Moteki	Hitoshi Ohne	Based on Mitsuro Kubo's romantic comedy manga. Set a year after the ending of the 2010 TV series Moteki with Mirai Moriyama reviving his leading role as Yukiyo Fujimoto. Arai appears as Yuichi Shimada, Fujimoto's long-suffering friend.
2011	The Eclipse's Shadow		Shiro Tokiwa	(short film) Three couples meet during the afternoon of a total solar eclipse.
2012	Liar Game: Reborn	ライアーゲーム-再生-	Hiroaki Matsuyama	Based on Shinobu Kaitani's manga Liar Game.
2012	Space Brothers	宇宙兄弟	Yoshitaka Mori	Based on Chūya Koyama's 2008 drama-comedy manga Uchu Kyodai.
2012	House of Quilt	キルトの家; Quilt no ie		Two-part NHK TV drama. Broadcast in January, 2012. After an earthquake, a young couple moves to a residential complex in Tokyo where they meet residents and learn about life from them.
2012	Helter Skelter	ヘルタースケルター; Heruta Sukeruta	Mika Ninagawa	Based on Kyoko Okazaki's manga that revolves around a superstar whose mind and life rapidly unravel.
2012	Ushijima the Loan Shark	闇金ウシジマくん; Yamikin Ushijima-kun	Masatoshi Yamaguchi	Based on Shohei Manabe's manga series.
2012	Outrage Beyond	アウトレイジ ビヨンド; Autoreiji Biyondo	Takeshi Kitano	A sequel to Kitano's 2010 film Outrage.
2012	Blazing Famiglia	莫逆家族; Bakugeki Kazoku (Bakugyaku Family)	Kazuyoshi Kumakiri	Based on Hiroshi Tanaka's 11-volume manga series.
2012	The Samurai That Night	その夜の侍; Sono Yoru no Samurai	Masaaki Akahori	Based on director Akahori's stage play.
2012	Hitori Shizuka	ヒトリシズカ	Hirayama Hideyuki	A TV adaptation of Honda Tetsuya's mystery novel, which revolves around a police investigation of six murders.
2013	The Ravine of Goodbye	さよなら渓谷 (Sayonara keikoku)	Tatsushi Ōmori	Based on Shuichi Yoshida's short story that explores the media's role in determining the guilt of a potential child murderer.
2013	The Eternal Zero	永遠の0 (Eien no Zero)	Takashi Yamazaki	
2014	100 Yen Love	百円の恋	Masaharu Take	
2014	Tada's Do-It-All House	まほろ駅前狂騒曲	Tatsushi Omori	
2014	Close Range Love	近キョリ恋愛	Naoto Kumazawa	
2014	Climbing to Spring	春を背負って	Daisaku Kimura	
2014	Kiki's Delivery Service	魔女の宅急便	Takashi Shimizu	
2014	Love's Whirlpool	愛の渦	Daisuke Miura	
2014	Judge!	ジャッジ！	Akira Nagai	
2015	Sayonara	さようなら	Kōji Fukada	Based on a play by Oriza Hirata.
2015	Parasyte: Part 2	寄生獣 完結編	Takashi Yamazaki	
2015	Akegarasu	明烏	Yuichi Fukuda	
2015	Hero		Masayuki Suzuki	
2015	Bakuman	バクマン。	Hitoshi One	
2016	The Actor	俳優 亀岡拓次	Satoko Yokohama	
2016	While the Women Are Sleeping	女が眠る時	Wayne Wang	
2016	Lost and Found	星ガ丘ワンダーランド	Show Yanagisawa	
2016	Hentai Kamen: Abnormal Crisis	変態仮面~アブノーマル・クライシス	Yuichi Fukuda	
2016	The Katsuragi Murder Case	葛城事件	Masaaki Akahori	
2016	Emi-Abi	エミアビのはじまりとはじまり	Kensaku Watanabe	
2017	A Boy Who Wished to be Okuda Tamio And A Girl Who Drove All Men Crazy	奥田民生になりたいボーイと出会う男すべて狂わせるガール	Hitoshi Ohne	
2017	Gintama	銀魂	Yūichi Fukuda	
2017	The Disastrous Life of Saiki K.	斉木楠雄のΨ難	Yūichi Fukuda	
2018	Samurai's Promise	散り椿	Daisaku Kimura	
2018	Thicker Than Water	犬猿	Keisuke Yoshida	
2018	Nakimushi Shottan no Kiseki	泣き虫しょったんの奇跡	Toshiaki Toyoda	
2019	Typhoon Family	台風家族	Masahide Ichii	

=== Television ===
- Penance (2012)
- Going My Home (2012)
- Hitori Shizuka Ep.2 (2012)
- Secret Honeymoon (2012)
- Makyo Onsen: Hito o sagashite (2012)
- Kuroi Junin no Kuroki Hitomi (Ep. Kuroi Hakui no Onna) (2012)
- The Locked Room Murders Ep.5 (2012)
- Kaitakusha-tachi (2012)
- Shokuzai Last ep. (2012)
- Hakuba no Ōji-sama Junai Tekireiki (2013)
- Taberudake (2013)
- Radio (2013)
- Shoten'in Michiru no Mi no ue Banashi (2013)
- Mahoro Ekimae Bangaichi Ep.5 (2013)
- Nobunaga Concerto (2014)
- 64: Rokuyon (2015)
- I'm Home (2015)
- Do Konjo Gaeru (2015)
- Ichiban Densha ga Hashitta (2015)
- Shitamachi Rocket (2015), Keiji Tomiyama
- Aka Medaka (2015)
- Sanada Maru (2016), Katō Kiyomasa
- Indigo no Koibito (2016), Kenji Harada
- Busujima Yuriko no Sekirara Nikki (2016, Shōta Ozu
- Totto TV (2016), Rokusuke Ei
- Haikei, Minpaku-sama (2016), Kanta Yamashita
- Kidnap Tour (2016)
- Midnight Diner: Tokyo Stories (2016)
- Shukatsu Kazoku: Kitto, Umaku Iku (2017), Kota Kunihara
- Innocent Days (2018)
