= Ghost Cat Anzu =

Japanese manga series

- Cover of the volume

化け猫あんずちゃん (Bakeneko Anzu-chan)
- Manga
- Written by: Takashi Imashiro
- Published by: Kodansha
- Magazine: Comic BomBom
- Original run: 2006 – 2007
- Volumes: 1
- Manga

Bakeneko Anzu-chan: Fūun-hen
- Written by: Takashi Imashiro
- Published by: Kodansha
- Magazine: Comic Days
- Original run: July 14, 2024 – December 29, 2024
- Volumes: 1
- Anime film
- Ghost Cat Anzu (2024)

Ghost Cat Anzu (Japanese: 化け猫あんずちゃん, Hepburn: Bakeneko Anzu-chan) is a Japanese manga series written and illustrated by Takashi Imashiro. It was serialized in Kodansha's Comic BomBom magazine from 2006 to 2007 and published in a single volume. A French-Japanese anime film adaptation by Shin-Ei Animation and Miyu Productions premiered in July 2024.

== Plot ==
Anzu is a cat who has lived at Soseiji Temple for decades in a rural town in South Izu, eventually transforming into a bakeneko, a supernatural ghost cat. Adopted and raised by the temple's head priest, Anzu continues to live at the temple, carrying out small tasks and interacting with the townspeople. His daily life is portrayed through episodic encounters with the priest, visitors, and residents of the town.

The story also focuses on Karin, an 11-year-old girl who is left by her father at the temple to live with her grandfather who is the head priest. The priest asks Anzu to look after Karin, leading to a sometimes difficult but gradually deepening relationship between the stubborn girl and the easygoing ghost cat.

== Characters ==
Anzu (あんず)
Voiced by: Mirai Moriyama
Karin (かりん)
Voiced by: Noa Gotō
Tetsuya (あんず)
Voiced by: Munetaka Aoki
Yuzuki (かりん)
Voiced by: Miwako Ichikawa
Oshō (あんず)
Voiced by: Keiichi Suzuki
God of Poverty
Voiced by: Shingo Mizusawa
Tanuki (あんず)
Voiced by: Sawabe Wataru

== Media ==
=== Manga ===
Written and illustrated by Takashi Imashiro, the series began serialization in Kodansha's Comic BomBom magazine in 2006. The series completed serialization in 2007. It was published in a single tankōbon volume on November 16, 2007.

A sequel manga by Imashiro was serialized on Kodansha's Comic Days website from July 14 to December 29, 2024. A single ebook volume was released on February 21, 2025.

=== Film ===
A French-Japanese anime film adaptation was announced on October 3, 2022. It is produced by Shin-Ei Animation and Miyu Productions, with Yōko Kuno and Nobuhiro Yamashita directing, Shinji Imaoka writing the scripts, Yōko Kuno designing the characters, and Keiichi Suzuki composing the music. Distributed by Toho Next, it premiered in Japanese theaters on July 19, 2024. The film's theme song is "Matatabi" performed by Chiaki Satō. GKIDS has licensed the film in North America.
