= Tamako =

- Gender: Female

Origin
- Origin: Japanese
- Meaning: Different meanings depending on the kanji used

Tamako (written: 球子 or 璋子) is a feminine Japanese given name. Notable people with the name include:

- Fujiwara no Tamako (藤原 璋子; 1101–1145), Japanese empress consort
- Tamako Kataoka (片岡 球子; 1905–2008), Japanese painter

== Fictional characters ==
- Tamako (タマ子), a character in the manga series Isuca
- Tamako (魂子), a character in the manga series Rin-ne
- Tamako Arai (新井 珠子), a character in the manga series Barakamon
- Tamako Inada (稲田 多摩子), a character in the manga series Silver Spoon
- Tamako Kitashirakawa (北白川 たまこ), protagonist of the anime series Tamako Market
- Tamako Kobayashi (小林 タマ子), a character in the manga series Kemeko Deluxe!
- Tamako Naruse (成瀬 珠子), a character in the manga series Nozoki Ana
- Tamako Nekoya (根古屋 珠子), a character in the manga series Anima Yell!
- Tamako Sakai (坂井 タマ子), protagonist of the film Tamako in Moratorium
