= Moshidora =

2009 Japanese novel

- Cover of novel featuring Minami Kawashima

もしドラ
- Novel
- Written by: Natsumi Iwasaki
- Illustrated by: Yukiusagi and Bamboo
- Published by: Diamondosha
- Published: December 4, 2009
- Manga
- Published by: Shueisha
- Magazine: Super Jump; (2010–2011); Grand Jump Premium; (2011–2012)
- Original run: December 22, 2010 – September 26, 2012
- Volumes: 3
- Anime television series
- Directed by: Takayuki Hamana
- Produced by: Atsuko Kashiwagi; Kenji Saito; Mitsuhisa Ishikawa
- Written by: Junichi Fujisaku
- Music by: Jun Sato
- Studio: Production I.G
- Licensed by: NA: AnimEigo
- Original network: NHK General TV
- Original run: April 25, 2011 – May 6, 2011
- Episodes: 10
- Live-action film
- Moshidora (2011)

Moshi Kōkō Yakyū no Joshi Manager ga Drucker no "Management" o Yondara (もし高校野球の女子マネージャーがドラッカーの『マネジメント』を読んだら; What If the Female Manager of a High School Baseball Team Read Drucker's "Management"?), or Moshidora (もしドラ), is a 2009 Japanese novel by Natsumi Iwasaki. It follows high school girl Minami Kawashima who manages her school's baseball team using Peter Drucker's Management: Tasks, Responsibilities, Practices to rally her dispirited teammates. A 10-episode anime television series by Production I.G aired between April and May 2011. A live-action movie was released in Japan on June 4, 2011.

== Plot ==
The story follows Minami Kawashima who, as a favor to her childhood friend, Yuki Miyata, takes over as manager for the Hodokubo High School Baseball team when Yuki is hospitalized with an illness. With no previous experience managing a team, Minami ends up picking up a copy of Peter Drucker's business management book, Management: Tasks, Responsibilities, Practices, and starts to manage the baseball team like one would manage a business, with the goal of reaching the nationals.

== Characters ==
Minami Kawashima (川島 みなみ, Kawashima Minami)
Voiced by: Yōko Hikasa
Minami is a high school kid who hates baseball, having had her dreams of becoming a professional baseball player shattered at a young age. When her best friend, Yuki, is hospitalized with an illness, Minami takes her place as manager for a high school baseball team, using Peter Drucker's Management as a reference point.
Yuki Miyata (宮田 夕紀, Miyata Yūki)
Voiced by: Kana Hanazawa
Minami's best friend who has been with her since they were babies. She has had a condition since when she was little and had become hospitalized after becoming the manager of the baseball team. She joined the team having been impressed seeing Minami play baseball as a kid, and dreams of taking her team to the nationals. However, just as the team reach the finals of the prefectural tournament, she succumbs to her terminal illness and passes away.
Makoto Kachi (加地 誠, Kachi Makoto)
Voiced by: Kenjiro Tsuda
The coach of the Hodokubo Baseball Team. While his orders are sometimes harsh, he always has the team's safety in mind. After Minami informs him about innovation, he concocts the 'no-bunt, no-ball' strategy, hoping to revolutionize high school baseball.
Keiichirō Asano (浅野 慶一郎, Asano Keiichirō)
Voiced by: Tetsuya Kakihara
The team's main pitcher. He is often determined to show his worth on the field, though his play tends to weaken after making 100 pitches.
Jirō Kashiwagi (柏木 次郎, Kashiwagi Jirō)
Voiced by: Akio Suyama
The team's catcher, who is also one of Minami's childhood friends.
Ayano Hōjō (北条 文乃, Hōjō Ayano)
Voiced by: Sayaka Nakaya
The team's score keeper and part of the management team. She is incredibly shy, usually saying little else besides "Oh, yeah, right," and has a strong admiration for Yuki.
Jun Hoshide (星出 純, Hoshide Jun)
Voiced by: Yoshimasa Hosoya
Initially the team's captain, though prior to the prefectural tournament he steps down from this position to focus on his plays.
Masayoshi Nikai (二階 正義, Nikai Masayoshi)
Voiced by: Shintaro Asanuma
One of the team members who joins the management team and is later made the team's captain after Jun steps down.
Fumiaki Kutsuki (朽木 文明, Kutsuki Fumiaki)
Voiced by: Ryouta Akazawa
The team's pinch runner. He is a fast athlete, often occasionally training with the track club.
Yūnosuke Sakurai (桜井 祐之助, Sakurai Yūnosuke)
Voiced by: Hideki Nakanishi
The team's shortstop. He is rather timid and often makes mistakes under pressure.
Daisuke Niimi (新見 大輔, Niimi Daisuke)
Voiced by: Yasuaki Takumi
He's the team's secondary pitcher. He often lacks physical strength.
Hanae Chin (陳 花江, Chin Hanae)
Voiced by: Yukiko Monden
Hanae is a friend of Yūnosuke's who tries to support him when he's down. She later joins the management team, wanting to make something of herself.

== Media ==
=== Novel ===
The original novel, written by Natsumi Iwasaki with illustrations by Yukiusagi and Bamboo, was published by Diamondosha and released in Japan on December 4, 2009. The novel sold 1.81 million copies during its first year and became the year's bestselling novel in Japan.

=== Manga ===
A manga adaptation was launched in Shueisha's seinen manga magazine Super Jump on December 22, 2010. After Super Jump ceased publication in 2011, the manga was transferred to Grand Jump Premium on December 21, 2011. The most recent chapter of the series was published in the magazine's October 2012 issue, published on September 26. The series has been suspended since then. Shueisha compiled the series into three tankōbon volumes, released from May 2, 2011

=== Anime ===
In October 2010, the Japanese public broadcaster NHK announced that a 10-episode anime television series based on the novel would begin airing on its network starting in March 2011. Due to the 2011 Tōhoku earthquake and tsunami, the series was delayed from its original airdate and aired between April 25, 2011, and May 6, 2011, instead. Aimed at men and women in their 30s and 40s, the anime series is produced by Production I.G under the direction of Takayuki Hamana. The series' screenplay is by Jun'ichi Fujisaku while Jun Sato composes the music. The opening theme is "Dream Note" (夢ノート, Yume Nōto) performed by azusa and the closing theme is "I Love You" (大好きだよ, Daisuki dayo) performed by momo.

==== Episode list ====
No.	Title	Original release date
1	"Minami Meets "Management"" "Minami wa "Manejimento" to deatta" (みなみは「マネジメント」と出会った)	April 25, 2011
When Yuki Miyata is hospitalized with an illness, her best friend, Minami Kawashima, offers to take her place as manager of Hodokubo High School's baseball team, despite the fact she hates baseball herself. She buys Management: Tasks, Responsibilities, Practices by Peter Drucker which she later discovers is about business management as opposed to managing a baseball team, but Minami nonetheless becomes intrigued by its contents. Deciding that she first needs to 'define what the team is', she talks with Masayoshi Nakai, who hopes to become the team's CEO someday. Later, Yuki recalls a memory on how moved she was when Minami scored a winning bat during elementary school, which inspired her to join the baseball club. Having determined what the goal of the club is, Minami's decides to move onto the next step: Marketing.
2	"Minami Ventures into Marketing" "Minami wa Mākatingu ni Torikunda" (みなみはマーケティングに取り組んだ)	April 26, 2011
While trying to figure out how to apply marketing to her management, Minami becomes curious about the team's pitcher, Keiichirō Asano, who rarely shows up for practice, and co-manager Ayano Hōjō, who is very shy around others. Yuki mentions that Keiichirō is an alumnus who rejoined his team, but became distant when he heard his favorite teacher got fired for allegedly beating students. Later, Yuki manages to get Ayano to talk about why she wanted to join the club, talking about how she wanted to change herself and make friends with others. Afterward, Minami and Yuki hold interviews with the teammates to find out what they want out of the club. When it comes to Keiichirō's turn, he expresses dislike towards the team's coach, Makoto Kachi, who pulled him out of a recent game as he was concerned for his body's limits. Minami decides she needs to learn to be a 'translator' for the jargon between the coach and the teammates. As a fall tournament takes place, Keiichirō's dropping performance following 100 pitches starts to show as he makes a lot of foul balls. Following the match, as the catcher complains about Keiichirō's throws, claiming he did them on purpose, Makoto, who had asked a fellow pitcher for his point of view following his talk with Minami, manages to voice Keiichirō's feelings to the other teammates. Afterward, Keiichirō starts coming to practise more often.
3	"Minami Tries to Specialise in Labour" "Minami wa Hitono Tsuyomi wo ika Sōtoshita" (みなみは人の強みを生かそうとした)	April 27, 2011
Despite showing some initial improvement, Minami notices the team being less motivated following a week of exams, with many members skipping practice. After school, Minami encounters Yūnosuke Sakurai opting for karaoke instead of practice, saying he's not worthy to be on the team following some of his slip-ups in the previous game. Looking to Management, she looks into 'consumerism', believing the absentees to be a form of boycott against the way they practice. Minami and Yuki ask Ayano for her help, who determines most players who only show up for games because of its competitive nature compared to practice. With this information, she and Makoto set up a new training exercise focused around teams and points which encourages the players to be more responsible and strive to improve themselves. Later, Keiichirō asks Minami to try to get Yūnosuke to rejoin practice, but he continues to avoid her. However, his friend Hanae Chin manages to make him listen to what Minami has to say, which includes how Keiichirō was able to improve because of his mistakes. After convincing Yūnosuke to resume practice, Minami gets Hanae to join the team before finding herself being approached by several club captains about managing their clubs.
4	"Minami Tackles Innovation" "Minami wa Inobēshon ni Torikunda" (みなみはイノベーションに取り組んだ)	April 28, 2011
After just losing an exhibition match, Masayoshi, who is a little downhearted about not being in the starting lineup, feels that both he and the team need to change to make it to the nationals. Minami makes some suggestions to Masayoshi after reading about 'Innovation' in her book, before being harshly reminded about the promises she made to the other clubs who approached her. After talking with teammate Jun Hoshide, Masayoshi decides to join the management team. Later, the team works on joint exercises with some of the other clubs Minami helped out with to mutual benefit. Later, as Masayoshi discusses innovation to the other managers, Minami suggests that Makoto aim to revolutionize high school baseball like other coaches before him. As an exhibition is being set up, Makoto reveals his innovative idea; the "no-bunt, no-ball" strategy.
5	"Minami Abandons Traditional High School Baseball" "Minami wa Kako no Kōkō Yakyū wo Suteta" (みなみは過去の高校野球を捨てた)	April 29, 2011
As the team work on their strategy, designed to reduce the time the pitcher spends on the field and encourage defense, Minami learns Yuki is due to undergo surgery on the day of the exhibition match. It is revealed that Minami used to love baseball when she was little, but as she grew older, her hopes of becoming a professional baseball player were dashed. The exhibition match goes underway, with the team implementing their new strategy to only aim for strikes. While the match appears one-sided, the team notices their improvement as the game goes on. After managing to improve on defense, they start to implement their no bunt strategy on offense which takes the other team by surprise. Despite losing the game, the team feels proud
6	"Minami Meditates on Strategies and the Status Quo" "Minami wa Senryaku to Genjō Nitsuite Kangae ta" (みなみは戦略と現状について考えた)	May 2, 2011
With new members joining the club and more responsibilities piling up, including evaluations on the other players, Minami decides to implement 'top management', splitting the various tasks amongst herself, Masayoshi, Ayano and Hanae. Minami becomes concerned that the growing number of applicants will result in many players never seeing the field, as well as leaving some of the other clubs empty-handed. She decides to focus on 'optimizing', interviewing each applicant and reducing them from 30 to 12 based on why they want to join the club, while recommending those who didn't make the cut to other clubs, though she forgets about the evaluations in the process. After thinking about her observations and the interviews, Minami and Makoto manage to decide on a starting lineup for the upcoming tournament, appointing Masayoshi as the team captain.
7	"Minami Thinks About Results" "Minami wa Seika Nitsuite Kangae ta" (みなみは成果について考えた)	May 3, 2011
The tournament begins, with the team winning their first five games thanks to their 'no bunt no ball' strategy, earning them a place in the quarter-finals. Afterward, Yuki gives her thanks to Minami for all the courage she had given her the past year, though feels downhearted when Minami appears to put more focus on results than the overall experience. As the team start to struggle in the quarter-finals, Minami has the crowd sing Keiichirō's favorite song to give him encouragement, and the team make a comeback, winning thanks to the pinch runner, Fumiaki Kutsuki.
8	"Minami Thinks About How Management Should Be" "Minami wa Manejimento no Arubeki Sugata wo Kangae ta" (みなみはマネジメントのあるべき姿を考えた)	May 4, 2011
Hodokubo faces off against Shuuhoku in the semi-finals, whose pitcher is one of the most fearsome and has a rivalry with Jun. As the score remains tied up until the last inning, Jun manages to hit a home run in the last inning. As they try to defend their point, Yūnosuke makes a few mistakes, leading to the bases getting loaded, but thankfully the support of his team help them knock out the other players and win the match. As the management team discuss taking Yūnosuke off the starting lineup, due to the mistakes he makes under pressure. Minami insists that he kept in for similar reasons to Keiichirō. However, as Minami goes to the hospital, she learns that something terrible has happened to Yuki.
9	"Minami Loses Something Irreplaceable" "Minami wa Taisetsuna Mono o Nakushita" (みなみは大切なものをなくした)	May 5, 2011
Yuki's condition takes a turn for the worse and she is put on life support, with nothing more that can be done to save her life. As Yuki's mother brings everyone to say their last goodbyes, Minami can't bear the bad news, wanting Yuki to fight through it, but her mother reveals that she had been fighting for a whole year despite being expected to only have three months to live. Minami feels guilty about the last thing she had said to Yuki before the quarter-finals. Yuki passes away by the morning of the finals and Minami becomes angry, believing everything she has done has become pointless and blaming herself for making Yuki suffer for so long. As Minami reveals her hatred for baseball, it is revealed the team already knew having been told by Yuki. Conflicted, Minami runs off, but Ayano catches up to her, bringing her back to the stadium as the team are down 4-0. Overcoming her fears, Minami begins to cheer her heart out for her team.
10	"Minami Is Moved By Highschool Baseball" "Minami wa Kōkō Yakyū ni Kandō Shita" (みなみは高校野球に感動した)	May 6, 2011
With encouragement from Minami's cheers, the team start making a comeback making the score 4-3 as it comes to the last inning. With Yūnosuke forced to make the definitive bat, he makes the same play that Minami once did when she was younger, the play that inspired Yuki to love baseball, allowing the runners to reach home and clinch the match. As the team celebrate their victory, Minami has a vision of seeing Yuki, remembering all the good times they shared together. With the memories of Yuki in their hearts, the team moves on to the nationals, hoping to play baseball the way the customers want.

=== Live-action film ===
A film adaption starring actress Atsuko Maeda as the lead role of Minami Kawashima was released in Japanese theatres on June 4, 2011. Over 30 companies bid for the novel's film rights, and it debuted on the 4th position in the Japanese box office with a total gross of US$2,232,675 on its debut weekend. The original soundtrack was released by Sony Music Entertainment on June 1, 2011.
