= Live 2016 =

Live 2016 may refer to:

- Live 2016, live album by John Bramwell, released in 2017
- Celine Live 2016 tour, concert tour by Celine Dion
- Adele Live 2016, concert tour by Adele
- Animelo Summer Live 2016 2016 in Japanese television
