= 22nd Japan Film Professional Awards =

Japanese film awards in 2013

- Date: June 15, 2013
- Site: Theatre Shinjuku, Tokyo, Japan

The 22nd Japan Film Professional Awards (第22回日本映画プロフェッショナル大賞) was the 22nd edition of the Japan Film Professional Awards. Films of 2012 which had not already won a major domestic film award were eligible. The ceremony took place on June 15, 2013, at Theatre Shinjuku in Tokyo.

== Awards ==
- Best Film: SR Saitama no Rappā Road Side no Tōbōsha
- Best Director: Kōji Wakamatsu (11/25 The Day Mishima Chose His Own Fate, Kaien Hotel Blue)
- Best Actress: Atsuko Maeda (Kueki Ressha)
- Best Actor: Arata Iura (11/25 The Day Mishima Chose His Own Fate, Our Homeland)
- Best New Director: Shō Miyake (Playback)
- Best New Producer: Kiki Sugino (Odayaka)
- Special: Ginza Cinepathos (In recognition of the theatre's achievements, which closed in March 2013.)
- Special: Naoko Otani (For Land of Hope and her longtime work.)

== 10 best films ==
1. SR Saitama no Rappā Road Side no Tōbōsha (Yu Irie)
2. Beyond Outrage (Takeshi Kitano)
3. Ai to Makoto (Takashi Miike)
4. Odayaka (Nobuteru Uchida)
5. Like Someone in Love (Abbas Kiarostami)
6. Himizu (Sion Sono)
7. Fly with the Gold (Kazuyuki Izutsu)
8. 11/25 The Day Mishima Chose His Own Fate (Kōji Wakamatsu)
9. Casting Blossoms to the Sky (Nobuhiko Obayashi)
10. Wolf Children (Mamoru Hosoda)
