= Seventh Code =

- Theatrical release poster
- Directed by: Kiyoshi Kurosawa
- Written by: Kiyoshi Kurosawa
- Starring: Atsuko Maeda
- Cinematography: Shinya Kimura
- Edited by: Koichi Takahashi
- Music by: Yusuke Hayashi
- Production company: AKS
- Distributed by: Nikkatsu
- Release dates: November 13, 2013 (Rome Film Festival); January 11, 2014 (Japan)
- Running time: 60 minutes
- Country: Japan
- Language: Japanese

Seventh Code (Japanese: セブンス・コード) is a 2013 Japanese action thriller film written and directed by Kiyoshi Kurosawa, starring Atsuko Maeda. It won the Best Director award and the Best Technical Contribution award at the 8th Rome Film Festival. The film was released in Japan on January 11, 2014.

== Plot ==
Akiko (Atsuko Maeda), a young woman, comes to Vladivostok to meet Matsunaga (Ryohei Suzuki), a young businessman she has met in Tokyo only once. Akiko finally finds Matsunaga. However, he leaves her again, warning her not to trust strangers in a foreign country. She tries to follow him, but she is attacked by thugs and dumped on the outskirts of town.

== Cast ==
- Atsuko Maeda as Akiko
- Ryohei Suzuki as Matsunaga
- Aissy as Hsiao-yen
- Hiroshi Yamamoto as Saito

== Reception ==
Deborah Young of The Hollywood Reporter gave Seventh Code a mixed review, where she found the "closely observed emotions" that were typical of Kurosawa's other works such as his Tokyo Sonata film and his made-for-TV serial drama Penance were "decidedly missing". Jay Weissberg of Variety described the film as "a quirky one-hour caper designed as a showcase for singer-actress Atsuko Maeda." Dan Fainaru of Screen International noted that "each of the film's sequences are shot and directed with the smooth, precise authority that clearly attests to Kurosawa's high professional standards." Mark Schilling of The Japan Times gave the film 3 out of 5 stars, commenting that "Maeda is not about to become a new action superstar from her work in Seventh Code, but it might well extend her appeal beyond her AKB48 fan base."
