= Kimi wa Boku Da =

Single by Atsuko Maeda
- A-side: "Kimi wa Boku Da"
- B-side: "Migikata"; "Toomawari"; "Aishisugiru to…"; "Sunday drive"
- Released: June 20, 2012
- Genre: J-pop
- Label: You, Be Cool! / King
- Songwriter(s): Yasushi Akimoto (lyrics)
- Producer(s): Yasushi Akimoto

Atsuko Maeda singles chronology
"Flower" (2011)	"Kimi wa Boku Da" (2012)	"Time Machine Nante Iranai" (2013)

Professional ratings
Review scores
Source	Rating
Billboard Japan	Favorable ("Kimi wa Boku Da" Act I)

"Kimi wa Boku Da" (君は僕だ, "You're Me") is Atsuko Maeda's second solo single. It was released in three CD+DVD "act" editions. The title track was used a theme song for the movie LOVE Masao-kun ga Iku!, which starred Shingo Katori. Following the release of this single, Maeda held her first solo live on September 15 at Nakano Sun Plaza and on September 22 at Kobe Kokusai Kaikan.

== Track listings ==
=== ACT.1 ===
CD

1. Kimi wa Boku da
2. Migikata
3. Toomawari
4. Kimi wa Boku Da (off vocal)
5. Migikata (off vocal)
6. Toomawari (off vocal)

DVD

1. Kimi wa Boku Da Music Video
2. Kimi wa Boku Da Music Video (Drama Version)
3. Making the music video “Kimi wa Boku da”

=== ACT.2 ===
CD

1. Kimi wa Boku Da
2. Migikata
3. Aishisugiru to…
4. Kimi wa Boku Da (off vocal)
5. Migikata (off vocal)
6. Aishisugiru to… (off vocal)

DVD

1. Kimi wa Boku Da Music Video
2. Kimi wa Boku Da Music Video (Drama Version)
3. Maeda Atsuko Graduation Documentary Interview

=== ACT.3 ===
CD

1. Kimi wa Boku Da
2. Migikata
3. Sunday drive
4. Kimi wa Boku Da (off vocal)
5. Migikata (off vocal)
6. Sunday drive (off vocal)

DVD

1. Kimi wa Boku Da Music Video
2. Kimi wa Boku Da Music Video (Drama Version)
3. Bokutachi no Goshujinsama ~Aikentachi to Maeda Atsuko no Nichijou~

== Charts ==
Chart (2012)	Peak position
JPN Oricon	2
TWN Five Music J/K-pop Chart	7
