= Time Machine Nante Iranai =

Single by Atsuko Maeda
- Released: September 18, 2013
- Genre: J-pop
- Label: You, Be Cool! / King
- Songwriter: Yasushi Akimoto
- Producer: Yasushi Akimoto

Atsuko Maeda singles chronology
"Kimi wa Boku da" (2012)	"Time Machine Nante Iranai" (2013)	"Seventh Chord" (2014)

"Time Machine Nante Iranai" (タイムマシンなんていらない, Taimu Mashin Nante Iranai) is the third solo single by former AKB48 headliner Atsuko Maeda; it was released in Japan on September 18, 2013. It is the first single she has released since she formally left AKB48. She first performed the song at an AKB48 concert in Sapporo Dome where she made a special guest appearance.

== Promotion ==
Maeda first performed the song at an AKB48 concert on July 31 at the Sapporo Dome where she made a special guest appearance. On August 15, Maeda released a promotional video for the single.

Maeda spent a week in New York City for the filming of the single's music video as well as posing for the jacket covers for the four different editions (Type-A to Type-D). The Type-A and Type-D jacket covers have Maeda at an old diner where she holds a tall shake or eyes a giant hamburger. The Type-B jacket was taken at Times Square. The Type-C jacket has her on a bicycle and was taken at Brooklyn Heights.

A promotion was held at Shibuya Tatsuya where over-the-counter purchasers of the single would receive a lottery ticket for a chance at an autographed poster. That same week, Maeda appeared on NHK shows Hemp 1, I dreamed Shi Asaki and Music Japan; and NTV's Music Dragon.

== Tie-in ==
"Time Machine Nante Iranai" was selected to be the theme song for the live-action adaptation of Yamada-kun and the Seven Witches. Maeda described the song as "cheerful and fun" and hopes it will liven up the show.

== Track listings ==
=== Type-A ===
CD
No.	Title	Length
1.	"Time Machine Nante Iranai" (タイムマシンなんていらない)
2.	"Kowareta Shigunaru" (壊れたシグナル)
3.	"Kaze no Accordion" (風のアコーディオン)
4.	"Time Machine Nante Iranai (off vocal ver.)" (タイムマシンなんていらない (off vocal ver.))
5.	"Kowareta Shigunaru (off vocal ver.)" (壊れたシグナル (off vocal ver.))
6.	"Kaze no Accordion (off vocal ver.)" (風のアコーディオン (off vocal ver.))

DVD
No.	Title	Length
1.	"Time Machine Nante Iranai Music Video" (タイムマシンなんていらない Music Video)
2.	"Making of Atsuko in NY"

=== Type-B ===
CD
No.	Title	Length
1.	"Time Machine Nante Iranai" (タイムマシンなんていらない)
2.	"Kowareta Shigunaru" (壊れたシグナル)
3.	"Yasashii Kimochi" (やさしい気持ち)
4.	"Time Machine Nante Iranai (off vocal ver.)" (タイムマシンなんていらない (off vocal ver.))
5.	"Kowareta Shigunaru (off vocal ver.)" (壊れたシグナル (off vocal ver.))
6.	"Yasashii Kimochi (off vocal ver.)" (やさしい気持ち (off vocal ver.))

DVD
No.	Title	Length
1.	"Time Machine Nante Iranai Music Video" (タイムマシンなんていらない Music Video)
2.	"Making of Atsuko in SAPPORO（2013.07.31）"

=== Type-C ===
CD
No.	Title	Length
1.	"Time Machine Nante Iranai" (タイムマシンなんていらない)
2.	"Kowareta Shigunaru" (壊れたシグナル)
3.	"I'm free"
4.	"Time Machine Nante Iranai (off vocal ver.)" (タイムマシンなんていらない (off vocal ver.))
5.	"Kowareta Shigunaru (off vocal ver.)" (壊れたシグナル (off vocal ver.))
6.	"I'm free (off vocal ver.)"

DVD
No.	Title	Length
1.	"Time Machine Nante Iranai Music Video" (タイムマシンなんていらない Music Video)
2.	"Atsuko Maeda, I fish the Tokyo Bay!!" (前田敦子 東京湾を釣る!)

=== Type-D ===
CD
No.	Title	Length
1.	"Time Machine Nante Iranai" (タイムマシンなんていらない)
2.	"Kowareta Shigunaru" (壊れたシグナル)
3.	"Tsumetai Honō (Note: As of September 3, 2013, King Records has not listed a title for the third track of its Type-D edition, however, the title "Tsumetai Honō" (冷たい炎) is found on Maeda's website.)" (冷たい炎)
4.	"Time Machine Nante Iranai (off vocal ver.)" (タイムマシンなんていらない (off vocal ver.))
5.	"Kowareta Shigunaru (off vocal ver.)" (壊れたシグナル (off vocal ver.))
6.	"Tsumetai Honō (off vocal ver.)" (冷たい炎 (off vocal ver.))

== Charts ==
"Time Machine Nante Iranai" debuted at number two on the Oricon Daily charts, behind Exile's hit, "EXILE PRIDE ~Konna Sekai wo Aisuru Tame~ (こんな世界を愛するため)". It would later peak at number one on the daily, and number two on the weekly chart. On Billboard's Japan Hot 100 chart, it debuted at number one.

=== Billboard charts ===
Chart (2013)	Peak position
Billboard Japan Hot 100	1
Japan Hot 100 for 2013	-
Japan Hot Singles Sales for 2013	75

=== Oricon charts ===
Release	Oricon Singles Chart	Peak position	Debut sales (copies)	Sales total (copies)
September 18, 2013	Daily Chart	1	28,137	74,293
September 18, 2013	Weekly Chart	2	60,687	74,293
September 18, 2013	Monthly Chart	7	70,853	74,293

=== G-music (Taiwan) ===
Chart	Peak position
Combo	15

== Release history ==
Date	Version	Catalog	Format	Label
September 18, 2013	Type-A	KIZM-207~8	CD+DVD	King Records
September 18, 2013	Type-B	KIZM-209~10	CD+DVD	King Records
September 18, 2013	Type-C	KIZM-211~12	CD+DVD	King Records
September 18, 2013	Type-D	KICM-1474	CD	King Records
