= Ghost Cat Anzu (film) =

2024 French–Japanese animated film

- Theatrical release poster

Japanese name
- Kanji: 化け猫あんずちゃん
- Revised Hepburn: Bakeneko Anzu-chan
- Directed by: Yōko Kuno; Nobuhiro Yamashita
- Screenplay by: Shinji Imaoka
- Based on: Ghost Cat Anzu by Takashi Imashiro
- Starring: Mirai Moriyama; Noa Gotō
- Music by: Keiichi Suzuki
- Production companies: Shin-Ei Animation; Miyu Productions
- Distributed by: Toho Next (Japan); Diaphana Distribution (France)
- Release dates: May 21, 2024 (Cannes); July 19, 2024 (Japan)
- Running time: 95 minutes
- Countries: France; Japan
- Language: Japanese
- Box office: $659,170

Ghost Cat Anzu (Japanese: 化け猫あんずちゃん, Hepburn: Bakeneko Anzu-chan) is a 2024 animated film directed by Yōko Kuno and Nobuhiro Yamashita and produced by Shin-Ei Animation and Miyu Productions. Based on the manga of the same name by Takashi Imashiro, the film stars Mirai Moriyama as Anzu, the titular ghost cat, and Noa Gotō as a young girl named Karin. The film opened in Japan in July 2024.

== Plot ==
The 11-year-old Karin accompanies her father Tetsuya to the Sousei-Ji temple, where her grandfather lives. Tetsuya has come to the temple to ask his father for money to repay his debts to loan sharks and leaves Karin at the temple when he is refused the money, promising to return on the anniversary of her mother's death.

At the temple, Karin encounters Anzu, a bakeneko (a supernatural cat who walks and talks like a human), uses a cell phone and moped, and works as a masseur. Anzu befriends two local boys Karin's age, who treat him like a gang boss. Anzu also notices that a local man, Yotchan, is being stalked by the God of Poverty, and tricks him into leaving Yotchan alone. Meanwhile, Karin is listless and bored in her new home, frequently visiting the train station to wait for her father, who never comes, even on their promised meeting date.

Anzu follows a flock of quails, discovering that they are actually forest sprites, and meets a monster frog and other yōkai. He invites them to a party at the temple, where they meet Karin. Karin cries about being abandoned by her father and having no money in order to gain sympathy from the yokai, which she is successful at. Later, Karin convinces one of the boys to steal Anzu's bike so she can run away to Tokyo. When she gets lost and is then found by the monster frog, she and Anzu head out together.

After being unable to enter the columbarium in Tokyo where Karin's mother's grave is, Anzu realizes the God of Poverty is now attached to Karin. The god leads them to the Land of the Dead through a portal in a out-of-order toilet stall in order to see Karin's mother. While there, Karin sees her father being dangled between life and death, and is informed he has been beaten "half to death" by the loan sharks. She then finds her mother, and takes her back into the land of the living while being pursued by oni and Enma, the king of the dead. Anzu, Karin, and her mother are chased to a festival, where the monster frog and the other yokai arrive to help, but they are beaten easily by the oni. Anzu tries to trick Enma into leaving them alone, but Enma refuses and pushes him aside. Karin's mother returns to the Land of the Dead, accepting the punishment waiting for her, but promises she and Karin will meet again.

Karin is then reunited with her father, who has survived his encounter with the loan sharks and paid back all of his debts. However, when he asks Karin to return to Tokyo with him, she turns him down, deciding to stay in Sousei-Ji with her grandfather and Anzu.

== Cast ==
Anzu (あんず)
Voiced by: Mirai Moriyama (Japanese); Jason Simon (English)
Karin (かりん)
Voiced by: Noa Gotō (Japanese); Evie Hsu (English)
Tetsuya (てつや)
Voiced by: Munetaka Aoki (Japanese); Andrew Kishino (English)
Yuzuki (ゆずき)
Voiced by: Miwako Ichikawa (Japanese); Erica Schroeder (English)
Oshō (おしょう)
Voiced by: Keiichi Suzuki
God of Poverty
Voiced by: Shingo Mizusawa (Japanese); David Goldstein (English)
Tanuki
Voiced by: Wataru Sawabe (Japanese); Jon Allen (English)

== Production ==
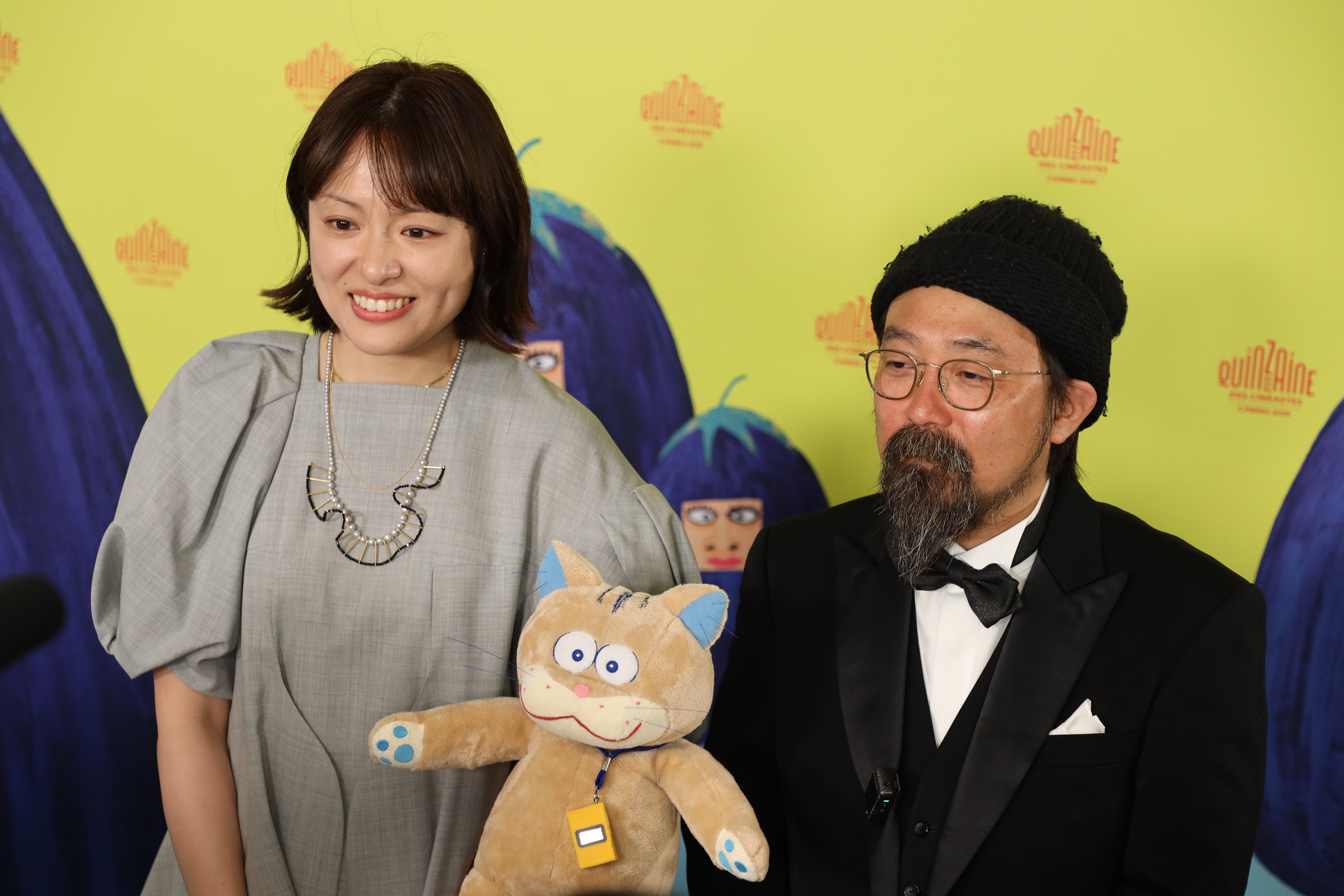
Directors Yôko Kuno and Nobuhiro Yamashita at the 2024 Cannes Film Festival

=== Animation ===
Ghost Cat Anzu was first filmed in live action; animation was rotoscoped based on this footage.

=== Music ===
The film's theme song, "Matabi", was performed by Chiaki Sato, and the score was composed by Keiichi Suzuki.

== Release ==
Ghost Cat Anzu screened as a work in progress at the 2023 Annecy International Animation Film Festival. That same month, it was acquired by GKIDS for a North American release the following year with Charades also handling international sales. The finished film premiered on May 21, 2024, in the Directors' Fortnight section of the Cannes Film Festival. The film was released in Japan on July 19, 2024, followed by a North American premiere at the 28th Fantasia International Film Festival on July 21, 2024. It was invited to 'Open Cinema' at the 29th Busan International Film Festival and was screened at the outdoor theater in October 2024.

== Reception ==
=== Critical reception ===
Deadline Hollywood's Valerie Complex thought the animation technique of using live-action recording made the film more authentic, but also noted the film's poor pacing and lack of a cohesive narrative structure. Similarly, Cineuropa's Olivia Popp praised the "charming and warm" animation but had issues with the uneven pacing. For Screen Daily's Wendy Ide, the voice acting was one of the highlights of the film.

=== Accolades ===
Award	Year	Category	Recipient(s)	Result	Ref.
Cannes Film Festival	May 25, 2024	Directors' Fortnight	Ghost Cat Anzu	Nominated	
Annecy International Animation Film Festival	June 15, 2024	Cristal Award for Best Feature Film	Ghost Cat Anzu	Nominated	
Sitges Film Festival	October 13, 2024	Best Feature Film	Ghost Cat Anzu	Nominated	
Sitges Film Festival	October 13, 2024	Best Animated Feature Film	Ghost Cat Anzu	Nominated	
Asia Pacific Screen Awards	November 30, 2024	Best Animated Film	Yoko Kuno, Nobuhiro Yamashita, Keiichi Kondo, Emmanuel-Alain Raynal, Pierre Baussaron, Hiroyuki Negishi	Nominated	
