= Justice (2002 film) =

- Directed by: Isao Yukisada
- Starring: Tsumabuki Satoshi; Christian Storms; Ayase Haruka; Arai Hirofumi
- Release date: 2002
- Country: Japan

Justice (2002) is a short film by director Yukisada Isao. It stars Tsumabuki Satoshi as Tojo, Christian Storms as Mr. Robert, Ayase Haruka as Hoshi, and Arai Hirofumi as Itadaki. The movie was released by Sega/Amuse as part of the Jam Films collection.

== Plot summary ==
Justice is set in a Japanese high school, where Mr. Robert's class is doing a running translation of the Potsdam Declaration. The action in the classroom is centered on:

- Mr. Robert's lifeless, monotonous recitation of the document.
- Itadaki's hurried efforts to write it all down in grammatically correct Japanese prose.
- An unnamed student's creation of pornographic flipbook animation in the corner of one of his textbooks.
- The initially drowsy Tojo.

Tojo, who is not paying attention, wakes up when he realizes a girls' gym class is running the hurdles outside. He clears the books and blank notes off his desk and begins to watch. Using the five-stroke Chinese character "正", Tojo keeps a running tally of when the girls readjust their buruma (literally "bloomers", roughly the same as the spankies cheerleaders and female volleyball players wear). Each readjustment is recorded with a color (red, blue, or green) and emphasized for the audience by the sound of snapping spandex.

The stunning Hoshi notices Tojo staring at her and she self-consciously puts her all into her time. When she trips over a hurdle and hits the asphalt, Tojo can't hide his alarm. Immediately, Mr. Robert turns on him and lectures about focusing on Potsdam rather than buruma. He uses racist language — "What do you Japs mean by this character?" — when he asks Tojo about the "正正正" written on the desk; Tojo's reply is "justice" ("justice" being 正義 in Japanese). After Mr. Robert looks out the window, who is astonished by the girls' beauty at the first sight, he throws Tojo out of class and tells him in English and Japanese to "get out in the hall".

The girls' gym class comes back into the building and Hoshi flirtatiously confronts Tojo, who sprouts a nosebleed when he sees her adjust her bloomers. He denies all wrongdoing but grins at the camera and displays a "V" for "victory" once Hoshi's back is turned.
