= Drucker in the Dug-Out =

- Poster advertising the film in Japan
- Directed by: Makoto Tanaka
- Screenplay by: Makoto Tanaka
- Based on: Moshi Kōkō Yakyū no Joshi Manager ga Drucker no Management o Yondara by Natsumi Iwasaki
- Starring: Atsuko Maeda; Haruna Kawaguchi
- Cinematography: Koichi Nakayama
- Edited by: Masahiro Onaga
- Music by: Takayuki Hattori
- Distributed by: Toho
- Release date: 4 June 2011 (Japan)
- Running time: 125 minutes
- Country: Japan
- Language: Japanese

Drucker in the Dug-Out: A Japanese baseball girl meets Peter Drucker (もし高校野球の女子マネージャーがドラッカーの『マネジメント』を読んだら, Moshi Kōkō Yakyū no Joshi Manējā ga Dorakkā no "Manejimento" o Yondara; lit. 'What If the Female Manager of a High-School Baseball Team Read Drucker's Management?'), or Moshidora (もしドラ) for short, is a 2011 Japanese live-action film directed by Makoto Tanaka which was released in Japanese cinemas on 4 June 2011. It is based on the bestselling book of the same name and followed a preceding anime series also of the same name.

== Story ==
The movie is about Minami Kawashima (played by Atsuko Maeda), a high school girl who becomes the manager of her school's baseball team in place of her hospitalized friend, Yuki Miyata (Haruna Kawaguchi). She tries to lead the team to the National High School Baseball Championship by learning strategies from the business book Management: Tasks, Responsibilities, Practices by Peter Drucker, which she mistakenly bought.

== Cast ==
- Atsuko Maeda as Minami Kawashima (川島 みなみ, Kawashima Minami), the team assistant
- Koji Seto as Keiichirō Asano (浅野 慶一郎, Asano Keiichirō), the baseball team's ace pitcher
- Minami Minegishi as Ayano Hōjō (北条 文乃, Hōjō Ayano), the team's scorekeeper
- Sosuke Ikematsu as Jirō Kashiwagi (柏木 次郎, Kashiwagi Jirō), the team's catcher
- Haruna Kawaguchi as Yuki Miyata (宮田 夕紀, Miyata Yūki), Minami's childhood friend
- Yo Oizumi as Makoto Kachi (加地 誠, Kachi Makoto), the team's coach
- Hiroshi Oizumi as the manager
- Hiroki Suzuki as Masayoshi Nikai
- Yukito Nishii as Yunosuke Sakurai

== Filming ==
=== Development ===
Drucker in the Dug-Out was first announced on 13 December 2010, together with the main cast. The main character would be played by Atsuko Maeda in her first lead film role. Although the book was modeled on her fellow AKB48 member Minami Minegishi, Atsuko Maeda was chosen because she had more acting experience. Minami Minegishi will also star in the film as a supporting character.

=== Music ===
Drucker in the Dug-Out's theme song was announced to be the song "Everyday, Kachūsha", sung by idol group AKB48. The lyrics of this song was written by Yasushi Akimoto, and the music was composed by Yoshimasa Inoue.

== Release ==
=== Box office ===
Drucker in the Dug-Out was first released in Japanese cinemas on 4 June 2011. It debuted in the 4th position at the Japanese box office with a total gross of US$2,232,675 in its debut weekend.

== Soundtrack disc ==
Drucker in the Dug-Out Original Soundtrack

Soundtrack album by AKB48
- Released: 1 June 2011
- Label: Anchor Records/Sony Music Entertainment Japan (UZCL-2016)

The original soundtrack for the film Drucker in the Dug-Out was released on 1 June 2011 by Sony Music Entertainment Japan.

== Merchandise ==
=== Official visual book ===
An official visual book of the Drucker in the Dug-Out film was released on 28 May 2011. It contains photographs of the making of the film.
