= 1905 (film) =

- Directed by: Kiyoshi Kurosawa
- Starring: Tony Leung Chiu Wai; Shota Matsuda; Atsuko Maeda
- Distributed by: Prenom H Shochiku
- Country: Japan
- Language: Mandarin
- Budget: $10 million

1905 (一九〇五, Ichi Kyū Zero Go) is a Japanese film that was to be directed by Kiyoshi Kurosawa and starring Tony Leung Chiu Wai, Shota Matsuda, and Atsuko Maeda. Originally scheduled to be released in late 2013, on 25 February 2013, it was announced that production of the film had been cancelled before filming could start due to difficulties with Tony Leung's involvement exacerbated by the Senkaku Islands dispute and the bankruptcy of Prenom H on 20 February 2013.

== Plot ==
In 1905, during the waning years of the Qing Dynasty, at a time when numerous Chinese revolutionaries traveled to Japan as students to study modernization, Yan Yunlong (Tony Leung Chiu Wai), a loan shark, travels to Japan to collect overdue debts from five men. Meanwhile, Tamotsu Kato (Shota Matsuda) is a member of Houkokukai, an ultra-nationalist group, who is also searching for the same five men.

== Cast ==
- Tony Leung Chiu Wai as Yan Yunlong
- Shota Matsuda as Tamotsu Kato
- Atsuko Maeda

== Production ==
Plans for the film were made in 2009. Although the film was a Japanese production, approximately 90% of dialogue was to be in Chinese. Filming was scheduled to start in November 2012, in various locations in Japan and Taiwan. The film was scheduled to be released in Fall 2013. During the filming process, the set in Taiwan was to recreate Yokohama as it appeared in 1905. The film was backed by Hong Kong-based film studio Sil-Metropole, and was to be co-distributed by Shochiku and Prenom H. The project was estimated to cost $10 million, and was Kurosawa's largest film to date.
