= Flower (Atsuko Maeda song) =

Single by Atsuko Maeda
- A-side: "Flower"
- B-side: "Kono Mune no Melody"; "Yoake Made"; "La Brea Ave."
- Released: June 22, 2011 (Japan)
- Genre: J-pop
- Label: You, Be Cool! / King
- Producer: Yasushi Akimoto

Atsuko Maeda singles chronology
"Flower" (2011)	"Kimi wa Boku da" (2012)

Regular Edition Cover

"Flower" is Atsuko Maeda's first solo single. It was released in four versions: three regular CD+DVD "act" editions and a limited CD-only theater edition. First pressings of the regular editions came with a photo book (unique for each edition), while the theater edition came with either a handshake event ticket or one of ten photos at random. The title track was used as an insert song in the film Moshi Koukou Yakyuu no Joshi Manager ga Drucker no "Management" wo Yondara, starring Maeda herself. The single was released on June 22, 2011.

== Track listings ==
The single was released in four versions: three regular CD+DVD "act" editions and a limited CD-only theater edition.

=== ACT.1 ===
CD

1. Flower
2. Kono Mune no Melody (この胸のメロディー)
3. Flower (off-vocal)
4. Kono Mune no Melody (off-vocal)

DVD

1. Flower music video
2. Flower music video <dialog ver.>
3. Maeda Atsuko Special Interview (前田敦子スペシャルインタビュー『今、考えていること』)
4. Making the music video "Flower"

=== ACT.2 ===
CD

1. Flower
2. Yoake Made (夜明けまで)
3. Flower (off-vocal)
4. Yoake Made (off-vocal)

DVD

1. Flower music video
2. Flower music video <dialog ver.>
3. Until Flower Blooms ~Maeda Atsuko's Journey~ (Flowerが咲くまで ～前田敦子の軌跡～)

=== ACT.3 ===
CD

1. Flower
2. La Brea Ave.
3. Flower (off-vocal)
4. La Brea Ave. (off-vocal)

DVD

1. Flower music video
2. Flower music video <dialog ver.>
3. Maeda Atsuko Fashion Book (前田敦子ファッションブック『今、着てみたいお洋服』)

=== Theater Edition ===
1. Flower
2. Kono Mune no Melody (この胸のメロディー)
3. Brunch wa Blueberry (Brunchはブルーベリー)
4. Mousou Denwa "Moshi, Maeda Atsuko ga Koibito Dattara..." 1 (妄想電話「もし、前田敦子が恋人だったら・・・」①)
5. Mousou Denwa "Moshi, Maeda Atsuko ga Koibito Dattara..." 2 (妄想電話「もし、前田敦子が恋人だったら・・・」②)
6. Mousou Denwa "Moshi, Maeda Atsuko ga Koibito Dattara..." 3 (妄想電話「もし、前田敦子が恋人だったら・・・」③)
- First pressings of the regular editions came with a photo book (unique for each edition), while the theater edition came with either a handshake event ticket or one of ten photos at random.

== TV performances ==
- [2011.06.19] Music Japan (NHK General TV)
- [2011.06.19] Shin Domoto Kyoudai (Fuji Television)
- [2011.06.20] HEY! HEY! HEY! Music Champ (Fuji Television)
- [2011.06.20] Coming Soon!! (Tokyo Broadcasting System)
- [2011.06.24] Music Station (TV Asahi)
- [2011.06.24] Happy Music (Nippon Television)
- [2011.06.26] CDTV (Tokyo Broadcasting System)

== Charts and sales ==
=== Charts ===
Chart (2011)	Peak position
JPN Oricon	1
TWN Five Music J/K-pop Chart	8

First Week Sales: 176,967 Total Reported Sales: 212,766
