= The Matsugane Potshot Affair =

2006 film by Nobuhiro Yamashita

- DVD cover
- Directed by: Nobuhiro Yamashita
- Written by: Kōsuke Mukai; Kumiko Satō; Nobuhiro Yamashita
- Produced by: Yuji Sadai; Hiroki Ohwada; Mitsuru Ōshima; Tetsujirō Yamagami; Haruo Okamoto; Eiji Watanabe
- Starring: Hirofumi Arai; Takashi Yamanaka; Tomokazu Miura
- Cinematography: Takahiro Tsutai
- Edited by: Ryūji Miyajima; Takashige Kikui
- Music by: Pascals
- Production company: Bitters End
- Distributed by: Bitters End
- Release dates: October 2006 (Tokyo International Film Festival); February 24, 2007 (Japan)
- Running time: 112 minutes
- Country: Japan
- Language: Japanese

The Matsugane Potshot Affair (Japanese: 松ヶ根乱射事件, Hepburn: Matsugane Ransha Jiken) is a 2006 Japanese drama film directed by Nobuhiro Yamashita, starring Hirofumi Arai.

== Plot ==
The lives of twin brothers Kotaro and Hikaru change when a woman's body is found on the outskirts of Matsugane after being hit by a car. Kotaro, a police officer, discovers that the woman is still alive and later finds out that it was his brother who had almost killed her.

== Cast ==
- Hirofumi Arai as Kotaro Suzuki
- Takashi Yamanaka as Hikaru Suzuki
- Tomokazu Miura as Toyomichi Suzuki
- Midoriko Kimura as Misako Suzuki
- Tamae Ando as Haruko Kuniyoshi
- Setsuko Karasuma as Izumi Kuniyoshi
- Miwa Kawagoe as Miyuki Ikeuchi
- Yūichi Kimura as Yuji Nishioka
- Mari Nishio as Yoko Togashi
- Ken Mitsuishi as Detective
