= Kueki Ressha =

- Poster
- Directed by: Nobuhiro Yamashita
- Screenplay by: Shinji Imaoka
- Based on: Kueki Ressha by Kenta Nishimura
- Produced by: Hiroyuki Negishi
- Starring: Mirai Moriyama; Kengo Kora; Atsuko Maeda
- Cinematography: Yoshihiro Ikeuchi
- Edited by: Takashi Sato
- Music by: Shinco
- Production company: Matchpoint
- Distributed by: Toei Company
- Release date: July 14, 2012 (Japan)
- Running time: 114 minutes
- Country: Japan
- Language: Japanese

Kueki Ressha (Japanese: 苦役列車, Hepburn: The Drudgery Train) is a 2012 Japanese film directed by Nobuhiro Yamashita. It is based upon the novel of the same name by Kenta Nishimura. The film was released in Japan on July 14, 2012.

== Plot ==
The story begins in 1986. Kanta Kitamachi is 19 years old. When he was in the fifth grade of elementary school, his family was torn apart due to a sexual crime committed by his father. After graduating from junior high school, he has been working as a day laborer, living from day to day. His only enjoyment is reading. He spends most of the money he earns on alcohol and sex, and never thinks about paying rent. One day, on the shuttle bus for his temporary work, he is accosted by Shoji Kusakabe, a vocational school student, and for the first time in his life, Kanta has what could be called a friend. Kanta has always had a crush on Yasuko Sakurai, a part-time worker at a used bookstore. Owing to Shoji’s approach, Kanta and Yasuko become "friends". Not knowing how to nurture a relationship with girls, other than by way of sex, he starts awkward relationship with Yasuko, even licking her hand after a date. He falls behind on his rent, borrows 50,000 yen from Shoji, gets drunk and asks Shoji's girlfriend, "Do you regularly masturbate?", leading Shoji to quit hanging out with Kanta who is full of problems. Kanta approaches Yasuko, saying, "You want to do it, don't you? You'll fall in love with me if you do it," making her run away. Loss of friends leads to his carelessness at work and fights with his boss, finally to being fired. Yasuko had quit her job at the used bookstore before Kanta knew it. A former colleague whom Kanta once looked down on was singing on a singing contest on the TV in the diner. After getting into a TV channel fight with a yakuza, wanting to listen to the song and getting beaten up, Kanta returns to his rundown apartment and sits down to start writing a novel.

== Cast ==
- Mirai Moriyama as Kanta Kitamachi
- Kengo Kora as Shoji Kusakabe
- Atsuko Maeda as Yasuko Sakurai
