= The Complex (film) =

- Japanese poster for The Complex
- Directed by: Hideo Nakata
- Written by: Junya Kato; Ryuta Miyake
- Produced by: Tadashi Tanaka; Masayuki Akieda; Takahiro Suematsu; Chiaki Noji
- Starring: Atsuko Maeda; Hiroki Narimiya
- Cinematography: Junichiro Hayashi
- Edited by: Naoko Aono
- Music by: Kenji Kawai
- Distributed by: Shochiku
- Release dates: January 27, 2013 (Rotterdam Film Festival); May 18, 2013 (Japan)
- Running time: 106 minutes
- Country: Japan
- Language: Japanese
- Box office: $8,738,992

The Complex (クロユリ団地, Kuroyuri danchi) is a 2013 Japanese horror film directed by Hideo Nakata. The film premiered at the Rotterdam Film Festival on January 1, 2013, and was released in Japan on May 18 that same year. A 12 episode drama, titled Kuroyuri Danchi ~Josho~ follows events leading up to those that take place in the film. It began airing in Japan on April 9, 2013. In May 2018, the series was released in the United States on Toku.

== Plot ==
Nursing student Asuka Ninomiya (Atsuko Maeda) moves to a dilapidated apartment complex with her father Isao, mother Sachiko (Naomi Nishida), and younger brother Satoshi. She tries to greet her elderly next-door neighbor Shinozaki with little success and befriends his ward, Minoru Kinoshita.

Asuka begins experiencing strange occurrences, including scratching noises and the sound of an alarm clock, both coming from Shinozaki's flat. She is also wary of her own family, who seem to be repeating the same actions and conversations every day. She later discovers Shinozaki died while scratching the wall, which she heard. A detective tells her that he has been dead for three days without anyone knowing. Since then, Asuka feels that Shinozaki resents her for not finding him sooner.

When a cleanup team arrives to clean Shinozaki's flat, Asuka becomes acquainted with Shinobu Sasahara (Hiroki Narimiya), a cleaner with experiences in the supernatural who tells her that the living and the dead experience time differently: the living moves forward, while the dead is stuck at the time they died. Asking about Shinozaki's haunting, she is told that he can contact a psychic friend of his. Returning home, Asuka is greeted by a completely empty home and no family and becomes hysterical. Shinobu learns from Asuka's foster parents that her entire family had died years ago; since then, Asuka has been blaming herself. Shinobu invites his psychic friend, Sanae Nonomura, who learns that Shinozaki's spirit is not hostile - he only wants to thank her for discovering him and warn her that she is in danger. She is actually haunted by Minoru, a boy from the apartment complex who died 13 years ago when he hid inside a garbage incinerator during a hide-and-seek game and was burned to death.

Asuka becomes withdrawn and depressed, refusing to move out. She continues to play with Minoru, seeing him as a replacement for her dead little brother. Shinobu and Nonomura force her to undergo an exorcism to expel Minoru's spirit from her damaged mind. Shinobu stops Asuka from letting Minoru in the flat even when Minoru projects her family's last memories. However, he himself is lured into Minoru's trap by the projection of his vegetative girlfriend, Hitomi Makimura (Megumi Sato). He lets in Minoru, who kills Nonomura. Asuka agrees to become Minoru's playmate in exchange for Shinobu's life. However, Shinobu pushes her away and gets himself thrown into a memory of Minoru's garbage incinerator and burned alive.

Asuka, found scratching and screaming at her apartment floor, is taken back by her foster parents. Despite their care, she continues to babble about her dead parents and brother while clutching her brother's doll.

== Cast ==
- Atsuko Maeda as Asuka Ninomiya
  - Yumena Kano as Young Asuka
- Hiroki Narimiya as Shinobu Sasahara
- Masanobu Katsumura as Isao Ninomiya
- Naomi Nishida as Sachiko Ninomiya
- Ruiki Sato as Satoshi Ninomiya
- Shiro Namiki as Takehiko Ninomiya
- Mariko Tsutsui as Eiko Ninomiya
- Megumi Sato as Hitomi Makimura
- Satomi Tezuka as Sanae Nonomura
- Yurei Yanagi as Ishizuka
- Masaya Takahashi as Shinozaki
- Kanau Tanaka as Minoru Kinoshita
- Taro Suwa as Detective

== Release ==
The Complex premiered at the Rotterdam Film Festival on January 27, 2013. It had its theatrical release in Japan on May 18, 2013. The Complex debuted in first place at the Japanese Box Office grossing $1,486,523. It remained at the top of the Japanese Box Office for two weeks. The film has grossed a total of $8,738,992.

== Reception ==
Critical reception for the movie was mixed. Screen Daily gave a positive review for The Complex, saying that it was an "impressively structured horror film that is likely to thrill audiences". The Hollywood Reporter panned the film as a "disappointingly cliche-bound return to J-Horror inspires more giggles than shivers."
