= Atsuko Maeda =

Japanese actress and singer (born 1991)

- 前田 敦子
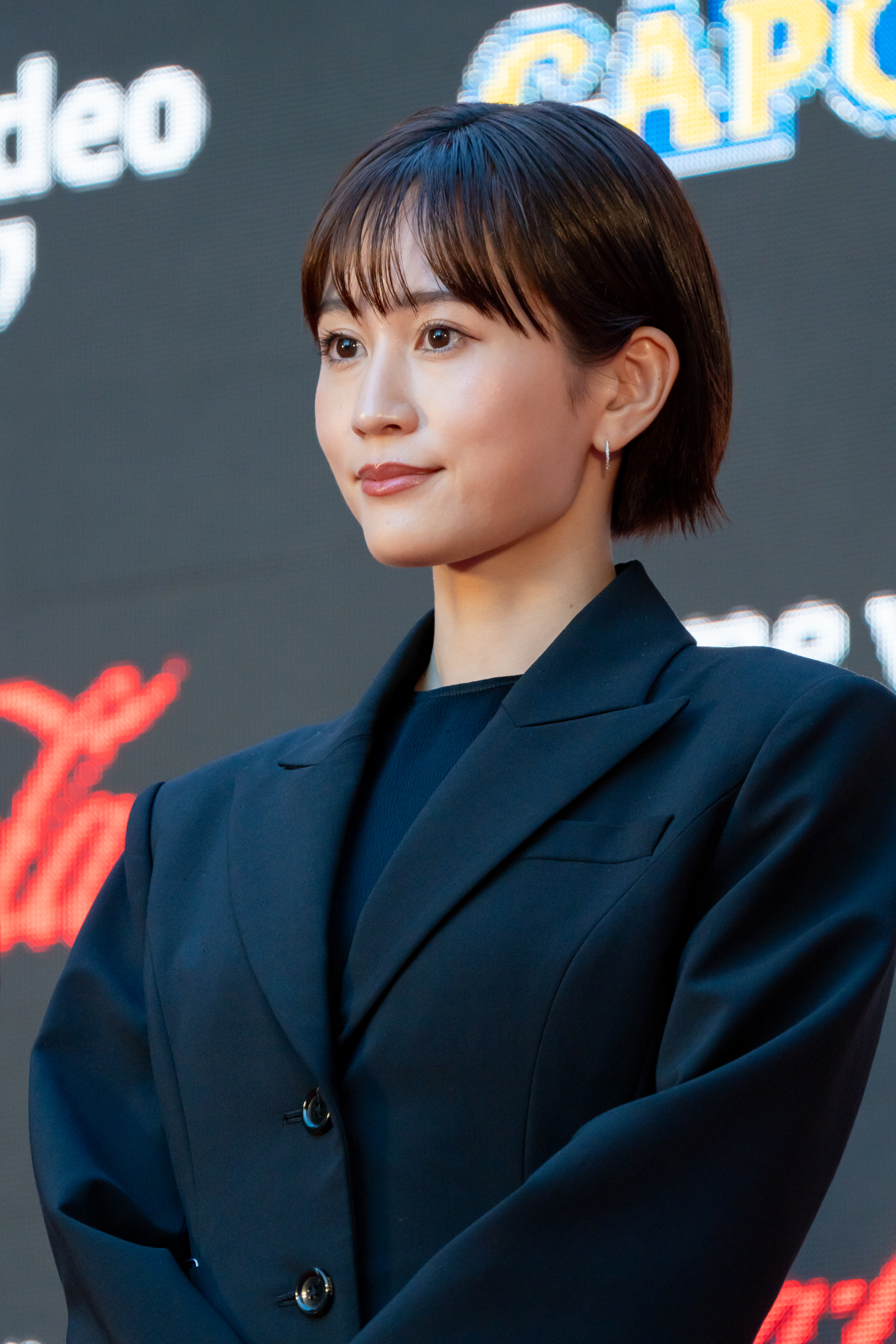
- Maeda at the 36th Tokyo International Film Festival in October 2023
- Born: July 10, 1991 (age 35); Ichikawa, Chiba, Japan
- Other name: Acchan (あっちゃん) (nickname)
- Occupations: Singer, actress
- Spouse: Ryo Katsuji (m. 2018; div. 2021)
- Children: 1
- Musical career
- Genres: J-pop
- Instrument: Vocals
- Years active: 2005–present (2005–2012 with AKB48)
- Label: King
- Website: www.atsuko-maeda.com

Atsuko Maeda (前田 敦子, Maeda Atsuko; born July 10, 1991) is a Japanese actress and singer best known for being a former member of the idol girl group AKB48. Nicknamed Acchan (あっちゃん), she was one of AKB48's most prominent members at the time with such monikers as the "absolute ace", "immovable center", and the "face of AKB". After graduating on August 27, 2012, Maeda has since then continued with a solo singing and acting career.

== Career ==
=== AKB48 ===
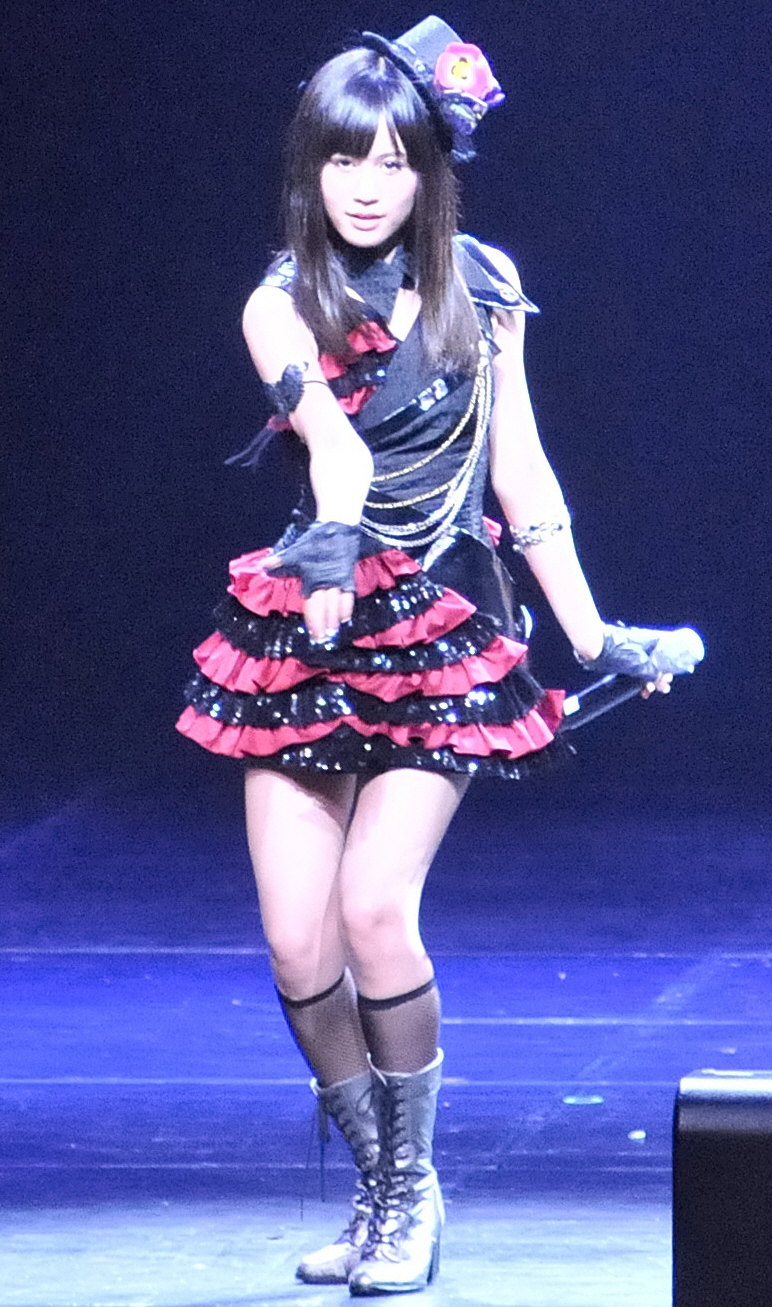
Maeda performs as part of AKB48 in 2011.

Maeda was born in Ichikawa, Chiba. At age 14, she became a member of AKB48's first group, Team A, which was composed of 24 girls and debuted on December 8, 2005.

In 2009, Maeda won the first edition of AKB48's annual general elections and played center for the group's 13th single, "Iiwake Maybe". The following year, she placed second overall to Yuko Oshima, but still had a significant choreography position in the lineup for "Heavy Rotation". Later that year, AKB48 employed a rock-paper-scissors tournament to determine the top spot of AKB48's 19th major single "Chance no Junban". Maeda placed 15th, which secured her a spot on the title track. Maeda also won the group's third general election held in 2011.

Maeda was one of the members who sang on every AKB48 title track since the group's inception. Her streak of A-side appearances ended in 2011, when she lost to Team K captain Sayaka Akimoto at a rock-paper-scissors tournament which determined the featured members for the group's 24th single "Ue kara Mariko".

On March 25, 2012, during an AKB48 Concert at the Saitama Super Arena, Maeda announced that she would leave the group. This caused a large buzz in the Japanese news, and spawned a rumor (later proven false) a student from University of Tokyo had committed suicide over the announcement. AKB48 later announced that Maeda would leave after the Tokyo Dome concerts; For her final performance, there were 229,096 requests filed for seat tickets. Her farewell performance and ceremony occurred on August 27 at the AKB48 theater, and was streamed live on YouTube.

=== Solo career ===
On April 23, 2011, Maeda announced that she would make her solo debut with her debut single "Flower", released on June 22. It was met with commercial success in Japan, debuting at number 1 on the Oricon Charts with first week sales of 176,967 copies.

The follow-up single "Kimi wa Boku Da", released in June 2012, was Maeda's last solo single while still a member of AKB48. It debuted at number two on the Oricon charts and reached number one on the Billboard Japan Hot 100.

On June 15, 2013, at AKB48's handshake event held at Makuhari Messe, AKB48 announced that Maeda would appear as a special guest at the group's summer concert series at the Sapporo Dome on July 31. There, she performed her third single, "Time Machine Nante Iranai" (タイムマシンなんていらない, I don't need a time machine), which was later released on September 18. It was selected to be the theme song for the live-action adaptation of Yamada-kun to 7-nin no Majo (Yamada and the Seven Witches). Maeda described the song as "cheerful and fun" and hoped it would liven up the show. "Time Machine Nante Iranai" eventually peaked at number one on the Oricon Daily charts, and number two on the Oricon Weekly chart. On Billboard's Japan Hot 100, it debuted at number one and stayed there for just the week of September 30.

Maeda's 4th single "Seventh Code" was released on March 5, 2014. It was used as the theme song of the movie "Seventh Code" in which Maeda herself starred. It debuted at number 4 on the Oricon charts and reached number three on the Billboard Japan Hot 100.

On December 12, 2015, it was announced that Maeda's first album would be released later the next year. Eventually, the album was set to be released on June 22, 2016.

=== Acting career ===
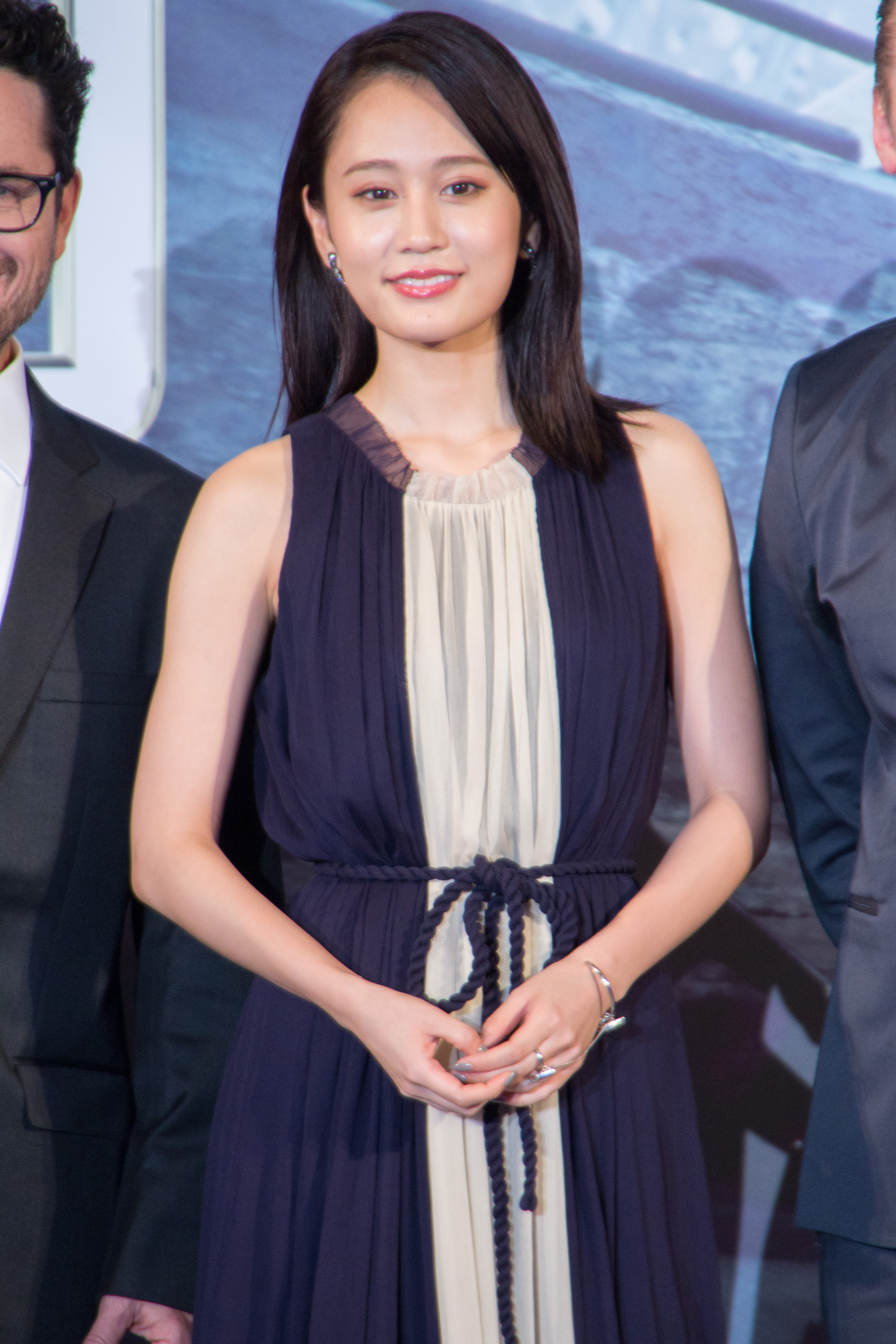
Maeda in 2016

In 2007, Maeda played a supporting role in the film Ashita no Watashi no Tsukurikata, which was her debut as an actress. She starred in the 2011 film Moshidora and appeared in Nobuhiro Yamashita's 2012 film Kueki Ressha. She also starred in Hideo Nakata's 2013 horror film The Complex. It was announced that she would co-star with Tony Leung Chiu-wai in Kiyoshi Kurosawa's film 1905.

In 2013, Maeda starred in a series of 30-second station ID videos for Music On! TV where she played Tamako, a Tokyo University graduate who does not find a job and lives at home where she just eats and sleeps, over the course of the four seasons. This became a TV drama special, and was developed into a full-fledged film, Tamako in Moratorium, the last of which was planned for a theater release in November 2013.

Maeda starred in the film Seventh Code, in which she plays a Japanese woman in Russia who is trying to track down a guy she previously met. The film was shown at the Rome Film Festival in November 2013, and was released for a short theater run in January 2014. She released a single of the same name on March 5.

In May 2015, it was announced that Maeda had been cast in the role of Kyoko Yoshizawa, the female lead of the anime and manga series Dokonjō Gaeru (The Gutsy Frog), in a live-action version of the story set to air on Nippon TV in July.

In 2016, she took the lead role of the drama "Busujima Yuriko no Sekirara Nikki" on TBS. The first episode is set to air on April 20, 2016.

In 2019, she appeared in Kiyoshi Kurosawa's To the Ends of the Earth (旅のおわり世界のはじまり), playing Yoko, a television host and would-be singer who goes to Uzbekistan with a small crew to shoot a travel documentary. In the film, she twice sings the classic Édith Piaf anthem, Hymne à l'amour (with Japanese lyrics), including in the finale.

== Personal life ==
Maeda married actor Ryo Katsuji; they registered their marriage on July 30, 2018. She gave birth to their first child, a son in 2019. On April 23, 2021, she announced that they have amicably divorced.

== Discography ==
=== Solo singles ===
Title	Release date	Chart positions				Oricon sales	
Title	Release date	Oricon Weekly Singles Chart	Billboard Japan Hot 100	RIAJ Digital Track Chart	TWN Combo	First week	Total
"Flower"	June 22, 2011	1	1	5	—	176,967	213,787
"Kimi wa Boku Da"	June 20, 2012	2	1	4	—	136,212	170,944
"Time Machine Nante Iranai"	September 18, 2013	2	1		15	60,687	79,081
"Seventh Chord"	March 5, 2014	4	3		—	42,784	53,286

=== AKB48 ===
Year	No.	Title	Role	Notes
2006	Ind-1	"Sakura no Hanabiratachi"	A-side	
2006	Ind-2	"Skirt, Hirari"	A-side, Center	One of seven members who sang on the title track.
2006	1	"Aitakatta"	A-side, Center	
2007	2	"Seifuku ga Jama o Suru"	A-side, Center	
2007	3	"Keibetsu Shiteita Aijō"	A-side, Center	
2007	4	"Bingo!"	A-side, Center	
2007	5	"Boku no Taiyō"	A-side, Center	
2007	6	"Yūhi o Miteiru ka?"	A-side, Center	
2008	7	"Romance, Irane"	A-side, Center	
2008	8	"Sakura no Hanabiratachi 2008"	A-side, Center	
2008	9	"Baby! Baby! Baby!"	A-side, Center	
2008	10	"Ōgoe Diamond"	A-side.	
2009	11	"10nen Sakura"	A-side, Center	also sang on "Sakurairo no Sora no Shita de", Shared center with Jurina Matsui of SKE48
2009	12	"Namida Surprise!"	A-side, Center	
2009	13	"Iiwake Maybe"	A-side, Center	Ranked 1st in 2009 General Election
2009	14	"River"	A-side, Center	
2010	15	"Sakura no Shiori"	A-side, Center	also sang on "Majisuka Rock 'n' Roll"
2010	16	"Ponytail to Shushu"	A-side, Center	also sang on "Majijo Teppen Blues"
2010	17	"Heavy Rotation"	A-side	Ranked 2nd in 2010 General Election, also sang on "Yasai Sisters" and "Lucky Seven"
2010	18	"Beginner"	A-side, Center, Mint	Also sang on "Kimi ni Tsuite" as subgroup Mint.
2010	19	"Chance no Junban"	A-side	Placed 15th in rock-paper-scissors tournament., also sang on "Yoyakushita Christmas" and "Kurumi to Dialougue"
2011	20	"Sakura no Ki ni Narō"	A-side, Center, Mint	Also sang on "Kiss Made 100 Mile" as Mint.
2011	–	"Dareka no Tame ni – What can I do for someone?"	–	charity single
2011	21	"Everyday, Katyusha"	A-side, Center	also sang on "Korekara Wonderland" and "Yankee Soul"
2011	22	"Flying Get"	A-side, Center	Ranked 1st in 2011 General Election, also sang on "Seishun to Kizukanai Mama", "Ice no Kuchizuke", "Yasai Uranai"
2011	23	"Kaze wa Fuiteiru"	A-side, Center	
2011	24	"Ue kara Mariko"	B-side	Did not participate in title song; lineup was determined by rock-paper-scissors tournament; She sang on "Noël no Yoru", and on "Rinjin wa Kizutsukanai" as Team A
2012	25	"Give Me Five!"	A-side (Baby Blossom), Center, Selection 6	Played rhythm guitar in Baby Blossom; she also sang on "Sweet & Bitter" as Selection 6
2012	26	"Manatsu no Sounds Good!"	A-side, Center	Did not participate in 2012 General Election.
2012	27	"Gingham Check"	B-side	Did not participate in title song. Participated in "Yume no Kawa" which was also her graduation song
2016	43	"Kimi wa Melody"	A-side	Marked as the 10th Anniversary Single. Participated as graduated member.
2021	58	"Nemohamo Rumor"	B-side	Did not participate in the title song. Participated in "Hanarete Ite mo" as graduated member.
2025	66	"Oh My Pumpkin!"	A-side	Marked as the 20th Anniversary Single. Participated as graduated member.

== Filmography ==
=== Films ===
Year	Title	Role	Notes	Ref(s)
2007	How to Become Myself	Hinako Hanada		
2007	The Suicide Song	Kana Takahashi		
2008	Nasu Shōnenki	Megumi Sasahara		
2011	Drucker in the Dug-Out	Minami Kawashima	Lead role	
2012	The Drudgery Train	Yasuko Sakurai		
2013	1905		Production cancelled	
2013	The Complex	Asuka Ninomiya	Lead role	
2013	Tamako in Moratorium	Tamako Sakai	Lead role	
2013	Pokémon: Eevee and Friends	Narrator		
2013	Seventh Code	Akiko	Lead role	
2014	Eight Ranger 2	Saigo Jun		
2014	As the Gods Will	Maneki-neko (voice)		
2015	Kabukicho Love Hotel	Saya Iijima	Lead role	
2015	Initiation Love	Mayuko "Mayu" Naruoka	Lead role	
2016	The Mohican Comes Home	Yuka		
2016	Shin Godzilla	Refugee	Cameo	
2017	Mukoku	Kazuno		
2017	Before We Vanish	Asumi Kase		
2017	The Last Shot in the Bar	Reiko Suwa		
2018	Dynamite Graffiti	Makiko		
2018	Flea-picking Samurai	Ochie		
2018	Eating Women	Tamiko Shirako		
2019	To the Ends of the Earth	Yōko	Lead role	
2019	Masquerade Hotel	Keiko Takayama		
2019	The Master of Funerals	Yukiko Watanabe	Lead role	
2019	Almost a Miracle	Rira Sakae		
2019	The Confidence Man JP: The Movie	Suzuki-san		
2020	The Confidence Man JP: Episode of the Princess	Suzuki-san		
2021	Caution, Hazardous Wife: The Movie	Reiko Saegusa		
2021	Remain in Twilight	Mikie		
2021	DIVOC-12	Toko	Lead role; anthology film	
2022	Convenience Story	Keiko		
2022	To the Supreme!	Machiko Okazaki	Lead role	
2022	I Am What I Am	Maho Yonaga		
2023	And So I'm at a Loss	Satomi Suzuki		
2023	The Lump In My Heart	Tōko		
2023	Love Will Tear Us Apart	Kaori Yasukawa		
2024	Voice		Lead role	
2024	Undead Lovers			
2024	Baby Assassins: Nice Days	Iruka Minami		
2024	Documentary of Baby Assassins	Herself	Documentary	
2025	The Sickness Unto Love	Toko Irumi		

=== Television dramas ===
- Swan no Baka!: Sanmanen no Koi (2007)
- Shiori to Shimiko no Kaiki Jikenbo (2008)
- Taiyo to Umi no Kyoshitsu (2008)
- Majisuka Gakuen (2010)
- Ryōmaden (2010)
- Q10 (2010)
- Sakura Kara no Tegami (2011)
- Hanazakari no Kimitachi e (2011)
- Majisuka Gakuen 2 (2011)
- Saikou no Jinsei (2012)
- Kasuka na Kanojo (2013)
- Nobunaga Concerto Episode 3 (2014)
- Leaders (2014) - Misuzu Shimabara
- Kageri Yuku Natsu (2015) – Yu Kahara (witness of infant kidnapping case)
- Dokonjō Gaeru (2015)
- Majisuka Gakuen 5 (2015)
- Busujima Yuriko no Sekirara Nikki (2016) - Yuriko Busujima
- Gou Gou, The Cat 2 - Iida (2016)
- Shuukatsu Kazoku(2017)
- Inspector Zenigata - Detective Natsuki Sakuraba (2017)
- Leaders 2 (2017) - Misuzu Shimabara
- The Legendary Mother (2020)
- Modern Love Tokyo (2022) - Aya
- Utsubora: The Story of a Novelist (2023) - Aki Fujino / Sakura Miki
- Kashimashi Meshi (2023) - Chiharu Oda
- The Crimes of Those Women (2023) - Yukari Jinno
- Baby Assassins Everyday! (2024) - Iruka Minami

=== Television shows ===
- AKBingo! (2008–2012)
- Shukan AKB (2009–2012)
- AKB48 Nemōsu TV (2008–2012)
- Gachi Gase (2012)

=== Documentaries ===
- Documentary of AKB48: The Future 1 mm Ahead (2011)
- Documentary of AKB48: To Be Continued (2011)
- Documentary of AKB48: Show Must Go On (2012)
- Documentary of AKB48: No Flower Without Rain (2013)

=== Radio shows ===
- Atsuko Maeda's Heart Songs (2010–2013)

== Bibliography ==
- Hai (2009)
- Acchan in Hawaii (2010)
- Maeda Atsuko in Tokyo (2010)
- Atsuko in NY (2010)
- Bukiyō (2012)
- AKB48 Sotsugyo Kinen Photobook "Acchan" (2012)

== Awards and nominations ==
Year	Award	Category	Work	Result
2010	Blog of the year	female section		Won
2011	35th Japan Academy Film Prize	Popularity Award (Actor Category)	Moshidora	Won
2011	Japanese Movie Critics Awards	new artist award		Won
2011	International Jewellery Tokyo	teenage department		Won
2011	VOCE Beauty Awards	The Best Beauty of The Year (special award)		Won
2012	4th Tama Film Awards	Best Emerging Actress Award	The Drudgery Train	Won
2012	22nd Japan Film Professional Awards	Best Actress	The Drudgery Train	Won
2012	Foreign Movie Import and Distribution Association	Foreign Movie Best Supporter Award		Won
2013	23rd Japan Film Professional Awards	Best Actress	Tamako in Moratorium	Won
2014	Selfish theater award	Actress award	Sun 2068	Won
2016	11th Asian Film Awards	Best Supporting Actress	The Mohican Comes Home Japan	Nominated
2016	3rd Inter Pet Best Pet Smile Award			Won
2017	Best Formerist Award	female section		Won
2019	11th Tama Film Awards	Best Actress		Won
2019	Fumiko Yamaji Film Award	Best Actress	To the Ends of the Earth, Almost a Miracle	Won
2024	37th Nikkan Sports Film Awards	Best Supporting Actress	Baby Assassins: Nice Days, Voice	Nominated
