= Seiji: Riku no Sakana =

- Directed by: Yusuke Iseya
- Screenplay by: Yusuke Iseya
- Based on: Seiji by Tomoki Tsujiuchi
- Starring: Hidetoshi Nishijima; Mirai Moriyama; Nae Yūki; Masahiko Tsugawa
- Release date: February 18, 2012 (Japan)
- Running time: 108 minutes
- Country: Japan
- Language: Japanese

Seiji: Riku no Sakana (セイジ 陸の魚) is a 2012 Japanese drama film directed by Yusuke Iseya.

== Cast ==
- Hidetoshi Nishijima as Seiji
- Mirai Moriyama
- Nae Yūki
- Masahiko Tsugawa
