= Penance (Japanese TV series) =

2012 Japanese TV Series

- Shokuzai
- Based on: Shokuzai by Kanae Minato
- Written by: Kiyoshi Kurosawa
- Directed by: Kiyoshi Kurosawa
- Starring: Kyōko Koizumi; Yū Aoi; Eiko Koike; Sakura Ando; Chizuru Ikewaki
- Theme music composer: Yusuke Hayashi
- Country of origin: Japan
- Original language: Japanese
- No. of episodes: 5

Production
- Cinematography: Akiko Ashizawa
- Running time: 270 minutes

Original release
- Network: WOWOW
- Release: January 8 – February 5, 2012

Penance, known in Japanese as Shokuzai (贖罪), is a Japanese television drama miniseries that started airing on WOWOW in January 2012. It is based on a novel of the same name by Kanae Minato and directed by Kiyoshi Kurosawa.

== Plot ==
15 years ago, an elementary school student named Emiri transferred from Tokyo to an elementary school in the small town of Ueda. Emiri soon became friends with Sae, Maki, Akiko and Yuka. Emiri invited her friends to her house and had good time.

One day, Sae discovered that her antique doll is missing from her case. Later, the five friends talk about the recent thefts of antique dolls in their town. Sae tells her friends that her antique dolls is missing as well. While they play volleyball at school, a man picks up their volleyball and gives it back to the girls. The man then asks if someone could help him fix a ventilation opening in the gym and points towards Emiri. Emiri says yes and follows the man. The other four girls continue to play and, after a while, notice that Emiri still hasn't returned. The girls decide to go to the gym where the man and Emiri went. When the girls get inside of the gym they find Emiri dead. The four girls cannot remember the man's face and, because of this, the man is never apprehended.

Several months later, Emiri's mother Asako (Kyōko Koizumi) invites the four girls to her house on Emiri's birthday. Asako sits in front of the four girls and tells the girls that she is sick of hearing that the girls could not remember the man's face. Asako also tells the girls that if the man is not caught the girls should make atonements for their wrongs. 15 years later, the lives of the four girls are in difficult states because of what happened in their past.

== Cast ==
- Kyōko Koizumi as Asako Adachi
- Yū Aoi as Sae Kikuchi
- Eiko Koike as Maki Shinohara
- Sakura Ando as Akiko Takano
- Chizuru Ikewaki as Yuka Ogawa
- Ryo Kase as Koji Takano
- Ayumi Ito as Mayu Murakami
- Mirai Moriyama as Takahiro Otsuki
- Teruyuki Kagawa as Hiroaki Aoki
- Hirofumi Arai as Detective Moriya
- Kyūsaku Shimada as Detective Yabe
- Kenji Mizuhashi as Tanabe
- Tomoharu Hasegawa as Keita Murakami
- Tetsushi Tanaka as Toshio Adachi
- Hazuki Kimura as Emili Adachi

== Release ==
The 270-minute film version of the drama screened out of competition at the 69th Venice International Film Festival in 2012.

== Reception ==
Oliver Lyttelton of IndieWire gave Penance a B− grade. He felt the first four segments are so unexpectedly funny, rich and moving that it makes more disappointing that Kiyoshi Kurosawa can't bring it to a satisfying close. Meanwhile, he also commented that the film is a reminder of what a tremendously talented writer and director Kurosawa is. Todd Brown of Twitch Film felt each episode is meticulously well constructed and beautifully performed. He said Penance is certainly an intriguing and worthwhile investment of time and effort despite not being up to the standards of Kurosawa's best work.

Mark Schilling of The Japan Times said, "throughout the series the Kurosawa style, minimalist but atmospheric, imparts an eerie, intimate tension to even the most mundane scenes, while revealing inner lives more by incisive suggestion than the usual TV-drama shouting." Andrew Sun of South China Morning Post noted the video quality and the predictable structure are constant reminders of that it is a television project. However, he said, "little of Kurosawa's brooding style is lost in the smaller budget and extreme close-ups demanded of the smaller screen." On Metacritic, the series holds a score of 58 out of 100 based on 7 reviews, indicating "mixed or average" reviews.
