= AKB48 Show! =

- Title card used from episode 128 to 163
- Genre: Variety show
- Created by: Yasushi Akimoto
- Directed by: Tomoko Matsuda; Takashi Arikawa
- Starring: AKB48
- Opening theme: "Matenrō no Kyori" (episode 199-216) "Influencer" (for Nogizaka46 Show episodes)
- Country of origin: Japan
- No. of seasons: 6
- No. of episodes: 216

Production
- Producers: Masashi Nishi; Shin Ishihara
- Running time: 29 minutes (without breaks)
- Production company: NHK

Original release
- Network: BS Premium; NHK World Premium; TV Japan (North America)
- Release: October 5, 2013 – March 24, 2019

Related
- AKBingo!

AKB48 Show! is a TV variety show produced by NHK in Japan, and aired weekly on BS Premium and NHK World Premium from October 5, 2013, to March 24, 2019. The show featured songs, comedy skits and short dramas performed by AKB48 and sister groups.

From September 2, 2018 until March 24, 2019, the show aired on BS Premium every Sunday at 10:50 PM JST, with repeats from previous episode every Sunday at 09:30 AM JST.

The show ended on March 24, 2019, after 216 episodes.

== Episode structure ==
Episodes usually start with a short skit set in a dressing room, after which the performers run onto the stage for their opening performance, which changes every episode. Generally the 48G groups have two or three musical performances. Some episodes have special performances, solo performances or live band performances. Some episodes (such as Sousenkyo Specials) has no music performances or are broadcast live from a remote location.

Full Band Performances (as of June 2017, including AKB48 FES)

- "One Night Carnival" (Nogidan - #66) - Original song by Kishidan
- "Magirashiteiru" (Mayu Watanabe - #82)
- "Bokura no Eureka" & "HA!" (NMB48 BAND - #113) - Infiltration report from NMB48 Live House Tour 2016
- "First Rabbit" (AKB48 TEAM 8) Live from AKB48 Fes 2016
- "Iiwake Maybe" (NGT48) - Live from AKB48 Fes 2016
- "Melon Juice" (HKT48) - Live from AKB48 Fes 2016
- "Seishun no Laptime" (NMB48) - Live from AKB48 Fes 2016
- "Kataomoi Finally" (SKE48) - Live from AKB48 Fes 2016
- "Ponytail to Shushu" (AKB48) - Live from AKB48 Fes 2016
- "Halloween Night" (AKB48 GROUP) - Live from AKB48 Fes 2016
- "365 Nichi no Kamihikouki" & "To Be Continued" (AKB48 GROUP - #130) - Live from AKB48 Fes 2016
- "Rainbow Rose" (Sayaka Yamamoto - #131)
- "Miss You" (Yuki Kashiwagi - #136)
- "Ayamachi" (Sayaka Yamamoto & Junichi Inagaki - #141)
- "Get You!" & "Love Trip" (Rino Sashihara - #154) - Sasshi solo versions
- "First Rabbit" (The Eightles - #190)

In the first episodes, were presented episodes of AKB Classroom in which Ian Moore talks to classes about the 48G universe. Some episodes are focused on a 48G particular event as "Request Hour" or a concert in another country. Episodes 35 and 36 were a TV adaptation of Documentary of AKB48: The Time Has Come.

On October 3, 2015, to mark the Season 3 Premiere a new opening title sequence was introduced, with a pink degradée background instead of solid white, and rotating cubes forming the show's logo, followed by a frame attached to a striped band (inherited from the opening sequence of 2014-15 Season) with one of the members shouting the title of the show.

On November 21, 2015, 48 SHOW was the only TV show to perform the full version of the song "Shekarashika!" from HKT48, four days prior official release. However, this episode wasn't aired on NHK World Premium, due to sports coverage. The Full MV from "Shekarashika!" was released in April 2016. 48 SHOW is also the only TV show to air NGT48's "Max Toki 315 Gou" edited MV, and NGT48 Official Channel wasn't released a full version (available only in single). On August 13, 2016, SKE48 performed live "Kin no Ai, Gin no Ai", thus making the only show to present the full-length song 4 days before its official release. "Bagutte Iijan" (HKT48) is the only 48G single not performed yet on the show.

From episode #128 to #163, a new opening was introduced, based on "Colorful Garden" animations, using footage from latest episodes, and the show's logo on white background with moving colored flowers. A 5th opening movie was introduced on episode #164 and lasted until episode #180. From episodes #181 to #198, a new title sequence using the song "Jyuryoku Sympathy" was introduced for the show's new timeslot. From episodes #199 to #216, the seventh and final opening sequence features the instrumental section of "Matenrou no Kyori" and clips from music videos from "Teacher Teacher", "Ikinari Punchline", "Hayaokuri Calendar", "Sekai no Hito e", "Kurayami" and "Yokubomono".

The last song performed on the show (episode #216) is "Yakusoku yo", performed by 56 members from 48G, and the final recording was held on March 15, 2019.

=== AKB48 Show Remix ===
Starting from April 2017 and lasting until February 2019, AKB48 SHOW REMIX presents a compilation with some of the performances presented in past episodes of the show, always with a single theme. 21 episodes from Remix Series were aired.

Remix Series episodes aired (2017–18)

1. Graduating Members I (April 29, 2017)
2. Team 8 SP I (May 27, 2017)
3. Nogizaka46 Show I (June 24, 2017)
4. Keyakizaka46 Show I (September 9, 2017)
5. Acoustic SP (September 30, 2017)
6. Team 8 SP II (October 28, 2017)
7. Fall & Winter Songs (November 25, 2017)
8. Nogizaka46 Show II (December 9, 2017)
9. NGT48 (February 3, 2018)
10. Fresh Members
11. Graduated Members II (April 1, 2018)
12. Greatest Hits (April 1, 2018)

Remix Series episodes aired (2018–19)

1. SKE48 - Part 1 (April 29, 2018)
2. Rina Ikoma (May 27, 2018)
3. SKE48 - Part 2 (June 17, 2018)
4. Summer Songs (July 22, 2018)
5. Acoustic & Live Band versions (September 9, 2018)
6. Solo Performances (October 28, 2018)
7. Original Member Unit - Part 1 (December 2, 2018)
8. Original Member Unit - Part 2 (January 6, 2019)
9. NOT AIRED
10. Special Edition (February 10, 2019)

== Segments ==
=== Last Segments ===
- Dressing Room opening skit
- General Manager Yui Yokoyama's Lecture Room
- Captain Reika Sakurai's Lecture Room (in Nogizaka46 Show episodes)
- 48G Daily Series
- Infiltration Reports
- Yuri Yokomichi's Dance Classroom
- Mirumiru Art Club

=== Former Segments ===
- Opening Challenger
- AKB News
- AKB48 Intense Classroom
- General Manager Minami Takahashi's Lecture Room
- Miki Nishino's Dance Classroom

=== The Lecture Room ===
During their series, the Lecture Room was one of the most important segments from AKB48 Show. From the first 3 seasons, this segment was host by AKB48 TEAM A/SOUKANTOKU Minami Takahashi until her graduation, on April 8, 2016. Starting from October 8, 2016 until the series finale, AKB48 TEAM A/SOUKANTOKU Yui Yokoyama take over the segment, which interviews one random 48G Member.

In Nogizaka46 Show episodes, this segment was host by NOGIZAKA46 CAPTAIN Reika Sakurai.

=== Broadcast overview ===
Season	Episodes	Originally released	
Season	Episodes	First released	Last released
1	43	October 5, 2013	September 13, 2014
2	44	October 4, 2014	September 19, 2015
3	40	October 3, 2015	September 24, 2016
4	36	October 8, 2016	September 30, 2017
5	35	October 7, 2017	September 23, 2018
6	18	October 7, 2018	March 24, 2019

Note that "Original aired date" refers to the NHK BS Premium broadcast, excluding specials & Encore/Remix episodes

OPENING THEME SONG

- "Juryoku Sympathy" (AKB48, from episodes 167 to 198)
- "Matenrou no Kyori" (AKB48, from episodes 199 to 216)
- "Influencer" (Nogiaka46, for Nogizaka46 Show episodes)

=== Episode list ===
A total of 216 episodes aired on NHK BS Premium.
