= Busujima Yuriko no Sekirara Nikki =

- Promotional poster from Busujima Yuriko
- Genre: Drama
- Directed by: Toshio Tsuboi; Maiko Ouchi; Yoshiaki Murao
- Starring: Atsuko Maeda; Hirofumi Arai; Daichi Watanabe; Shizuka Nakamura
- Opening theme: "Selfish" by Atsuko Maeda
- Composer: Pascals
- Country of origin: Japan
- No. of episodes: 10

Production
- Producers: Azusa Hashimoto; Hiroshi Togeta
- Running time: 30 Minutes

Original release
- Network: Tokyo Broadcasting System
- Release: April 20 – June 22, 2016

Busujima Yuriko no Sekirara Nikki (毒島ゆり子のせきらら日記; The Stark Diary of Yuriko Busujima) is a 2016 Renzoku drama, starring former AKB48 member Atsuko Maeda, starting April 20, 2016. It aired every Wednesday at 24:10 JST (00:10) on Tokyo Broadcasting System. The story focuses on the scandalous daily life of Yuriko Busujima.

== About The Show ==
This is a "late-night soap opera". While working hard as a beat reporter of tycoon politicians, Yuriko is enjoying unbridled love in her private life. In the course of her work, she meets a man who she is instantly attracted to and falls in love. With the themes of love, two-timing and infidelity, this drama faithfully portrays the stark views of love and careers of modern young Japanese women. The drama centres on the two subjects of love and politics. Yuriko's views on love stem from an incident during her childhood, when she encountered her father having an affair, triggering her to develop her own set of rules for avoiding heartache from men. She ensures that she always has two boyfriends, so that even if one dumps her, she will still be loved by the other. To Yuriko, love and betrayal are inseparable. When she sees that the politician she is assigned to will be betrayed, she realizes that the political world is also one of love and betrayal.

The title song, "Selfish", is performed by Atsuko Maeda, with lyrics and production by Yasushi Akimoto. This marks Atsuko's first new song since "Seventh Chord", as she will release her first solo album on June 22, 2016. The title has a meaning of "self-centered" and "selfish", suiting the character of Yuriko. The lyrics intertwine with the character of Yuriko according to Maeda, who commented that "I am sure and I think we view of the world of drama is transmitted." The song performed in the drama by the character Midori Haba Watanabe Daichi is entitled "Let me hug you", a new release from the Japanese rock band 'Black Cat Chelsea'. The song was written by Watanabe for the drama.

== Staff ==
- Opening Theme: "Selfish" (Performed by: Atsuko Maeda)
- Script: Koichi Yajima
- Producers: Azusa Hashimoto, Hiroshi Togeta
- Music Composer: Pascals
- Directed by: Toshio Tsuboi, Maiko Ouchi, Yoshiaki Murao
- Produced by: Tokyo Broadcasting System
