= AKB48 Fes 2016 =

- Genre: Music
- Created by: Yasushi Akimoto
- Directed by: Tomoko Matsuda
- Starring: AKB48; SKE48; NMB48; HKT48; AKB48 TEAM 8 Kyosuke Yabe; Toru Nomaguchi; Masanori Ishii
- Opening theme: "Overture" (Special ver.)
- Ending theme: "Love Trip" (by AKB48)
- Country of origin: Japan

Production
- Executive producer: Shin Ishihara
- Producer: Masashi Nishi
- Production locations: NHK Hall; Tokyo, Japan
- Running time: 180 Minutes
- Production companies: NHK Enterprises; Sony Pictures Television

Original release
- Network: BS Premium
- Release: October 22 – October 22, 2016

AKB48 Fes 2016 is the special event held by AKB48 and sister groups, recorded live at NHK Hall, in July 14, 2016. This program will air on October 22, 2016 from 20:00 to 23:00 JST. The 3-hour special includes 41 songs and comedy skits, and features a live band in the last segment.

Three songs from Encore aired on regular episodes of AKB48 Show!. "Love Trip" was the opening performance from episode #120, and will be the final song for the special. The other two songs are "365 Nichi no Kamihikouki" & "To Be Continued", and will air on episode #130.

== Segments ==
=== Special ===
- Opening performances from 48G
  - Max Toki 315-go
  - 47 no Suteki na Machi e
  - Ibiza Girl
  - Oki Doki
  - Flying Get
  - Oogoe Diamond
  - Koisuru Fortune Cookie
- Comedy Skit #1
  - "Ōgoe Diamond/Koisuru Fortune Cookie"
- Solo Performances
  - "Shonichi" by Miyu Takeuchi
  - "Give Me Five!" by Kurena Cho & Erina Oda
  - "Kareha no Station" by Rion Azuma & Nao Furuhata
- Comedy Skit #2
- NMB48 BAND Showcase
  - "HA!"
  - "Punkish"
- Comedy Skit #3
- Miki Nishino Dance Classroom ~Special Edition~
- Dance Showcase
- Special Units Showcase
  - "Ame no Pianist"
  - "Heart Gata Virus"
  - "Candy"
  - "Warukii" by Miyuki Watanabe & Sayaka Yamamoto
  - "Kiseki wa ma ni Awanai"
  - "Zannen Shoujo"
  - "Itoshiki Natasha"
- Closing performances featuring Live Band
  - "First Rabbit"
  - "Iiwake Maybe"
  - "Melon Juice"
  - "Seishun no Laptime"
  - "Kataomoi Finally"
  - "Ponytail to Shushu"
- Halloween Finale
  - "Halloween Night" with Live Band

=== Extras ===
- Encore
  - "LOVE TRIP" (On-Air setlist, aired on AKB48 Show! #120)
  - "365 Nichi no Kamihikouki" with Live Band (airs on AKB48 Show! #130)
  - Grand Finale: "To Be Continued" with Live Band (airs on AKB48 Show! #130)
- Sayaka Yamamoto's birthday surprise & Miyuki Watanabe final message
- BONUS FOOTAGE: Making of from AKB48 Fes (airs on AKB48 Show! #130)
