= Tamako in Moratorium =

- Poster
- Directed by: Nobuhiro Yamashita
- Screenplay by: Kosuke Mukai
- Starring: Atsuko Maeda
- Cinematography: Akiko Ashizawa; Yoshihiro Ikeuchi
- Edited by: Takashi Sato
- Music by: Shoji Ikenaga
- Distributed by: Bitters End
- Release dates: October 2013 (Busan International Film Festival); November 23, 2013 (Japan)
- Running time: 78 minutes
- Country: Japan
- Language: Japanese

Tamako in Moratorium (Japanese: もらとりあむタマ子, Hepburn: Moratoriamu Tamako) is a 2013 Japanese film directed by Nobuhiro Yamashita. It stars the former AKB48 member Atsuko Maeda as Tamako, an unemployed graduate who lives with her father. It premiered at the 2013 Busan International Film Festival and was released in Japan on 23 November 2013.

== Plot ==
Tamako is an unemployed university graduate living with her divorced father, who runs a sports equipment shop. Tamako spends her time sleeping, eating, watching TV, reading manga, and playing video games. She is disdainful of her father, who is fond of her but wants her to find a job. He often comes home drunk, full of affection, and buys her expensive gifts, which she demands he return.

With the help of a local boy, Tamako has an amateur photoshoot and secretly applies for an idol group. Her father finds out, embarrassing her.

Tamako learns that her father is dating a local teacher. She attends her accessory making class to learn more about her. They strike up conversation, and the woman realises who she is, trying to make friends. After Tamako complains to her about her father, the woman tells her she is mean.

== Cast ==
- Tamako Sakai - Atsuko Maeda
- Yoshitsugu Sakai - Suon Kan
- Jin - Seiya Ito
- Keisuke Sakai - Keiichi Suzuki
- Yoshiko Sakai - Kumi Nakamura
- Yoko - Yasuko Tomita

== Reception ==
Tamako in Moratorium was named the ninth-best Japanese film of 2013 by Kinema Junpo. The Japanese Professional Movie Awards ranked it at 6th place in its Best 10 2013 rankings.

== Awards ==
- 23rd Japanese Professional Movie Awards - Best Actress
