= Kenta Nishimura =

Japanese novelist (1967–2022)

- Born: 12 July 1967; Edogawa, Tokyo, Japan
- Died: 5 February 2022 (aged 54); Kita, Tokyo, Japan
- Education: Middle school graduate
- Occupation: Novelist
- Writing career
- Language: Japanese
- Notable work: Kueki Ressha (2010)
- Notable awards: Noma Literary New Face Prize for Ankyo no yado, Akutagawa Prize for Kueki Ressha

Kenta Nishimura (西村賢太, Nishimura Kenta; 12 July 1967 – 5 February 2022) was a Japanese novelist. He was awarded the 2010 Akutagawa Prize for the novel Kueki Ressha (苦役列車). Having dropped out of school at fifteen, Nishimura's lack of formal education and candidness concerning his lifestyle has drawn media attention.

Nishimura died in Tokyo on 5 February 2022, at the age of 54. Nishimura complained of poor health while in a taxi he boarded the night before, and was taken to the hospital. Police are investigating the cause of death.

== See also ==
- Seizo Fujisawa - A Japanese novelist (1889-1932). Nishimura admired Fujisawa's works and called himself a "posthumous disciple". Nishimura built a tomb next to Fujisawa's grave before his death.
