= Mirai Moriyama =

Japanese actor and dancer (born 1984)

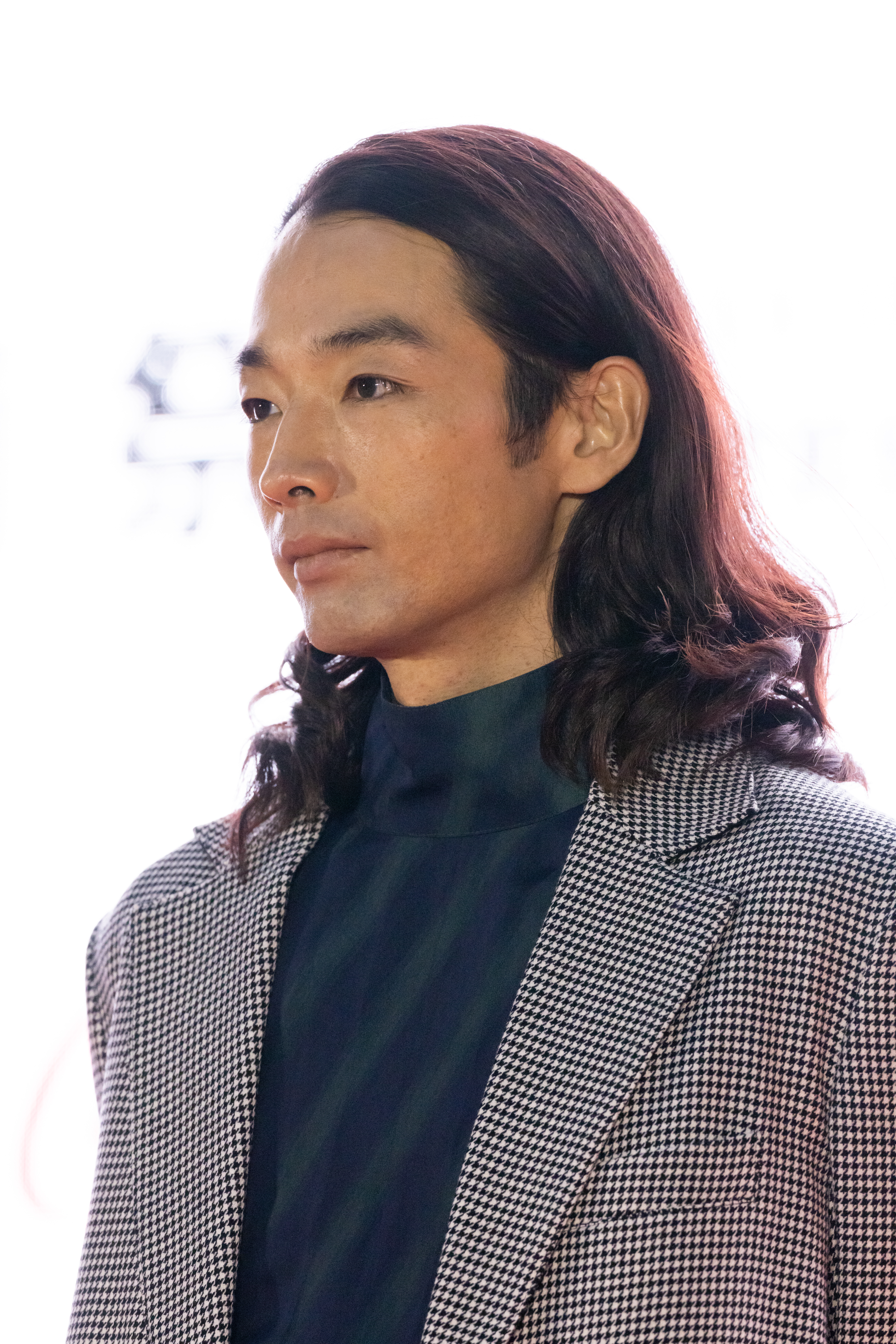
- Moriyama in 2022
- Born: August 20, 1984 (age 42); Kobe, Hyōgo Prefecture, Japan
- Occupation: Actor
- Years active: 1999–present

Mirai Moriyama (Japanese: 森山 未來, Hepburn: Moriyama Mirai; born August 20, 1984) is a Japanese actor and dancer.

== Life and career ==
Moriyama started training in dance when he was 5 years old. He trained in jazz dance, tap dance, ballet and hip-hop, and he appeared in several stage roles. He officially made his stage debut with 1999 Boys Time. In 2008, he played the lead character in a Japanese version of the musical RENT.

In the 2004 film Socrates in Love, he played a high school age hero trying to deal with his terminally-ill girlfriend. He also portrayed the character Kakuta in the film 20th Century Boys.

He starred in Kueki Ressha. He also appeared in Kiyoshi Kurosawa's television drama Penance and Junji Sakamoto's film A Chorus of Angels. In July 2021, he performed in the opening ceremony of the Tokyo Olympic Games.

== Filmography ==
=== Film ===
- Crying Out Love in the Center of the World (2004)
- Smile (2007)
- One Million Yen Girl (2008)
- 20th Century Boys 1: Beginning of the End (2008)
- 20th Century Boys 2: The Last Hope (2009)
- 20th Century Boys 3: Redemption (2009)
- Fish Story (2009)
- Moteki (2010)
- Seiji: Riku no Sakana (2012)
- The Drudgery Train (2012)
- A Chorus of Angels (2012)
- Always: Sunset on Third Street '64 (2012)
- Saint Young Men (2013)
- Human Trust (2013)
- Rage (2016)
- Vision (2018), Gaku
- Samurai Marathon (2019)
- I Was a Secret Bitch (2019), Misawa
- The Horse Thieves: Roads of Time (2019)
- Underdog (2020), Suenaga
- We Couldn't Become Adults (2021), Makoto Satō
- Inu-Oh (2021), Tomona (voice)
- Miss Osaka (2022)
- Mountain Woman (2023), Mountain man
- Shin Kamen Rider (2023), Ichiro Midorikawa / Kamen Rider No. 0
- Shadow of Fire (2023)
- Great Absence (2024)
- Ghost Cat Anzu (2024), Anzu (voice)
- I Ai (2024)
- Ya Boy Kongming! The Movie (2025), Owner Kobayashi
- Kyojo: Requiem (2026), Haru Tozaki

=== Television ===
- Waterboys 2 (2003)
- Itoshi Kimi e (2004)
- Dangerous Beauty (2005)
- Moteki (2010)
- Penance (2012)
- Inagakike no Moshu (2017)
- Miotsukushi Ryōrichō (2017)
- Idaten (2019), Kōzō Minobe
- Thus Spoke Kishibe Rohan (2020), Shishi Jūgo
- Prism (2022), Yūma
- Ya Boy Kongming! (2023), Owner Kobayashi
- The Child of God Murmurs (2023)
- Kazama Kimichika: Kyojo Zero (2023), Haru Tozaki
- Grass for My Pillow (2026), Shokichi Hamada

=== Video games ===
- Dragon Quest Heroes II (2016)

=== Theatre ===
- Metamorphosis (2009)
