= Nobuhiro Yamashita =

Japanese film director (born 1976)

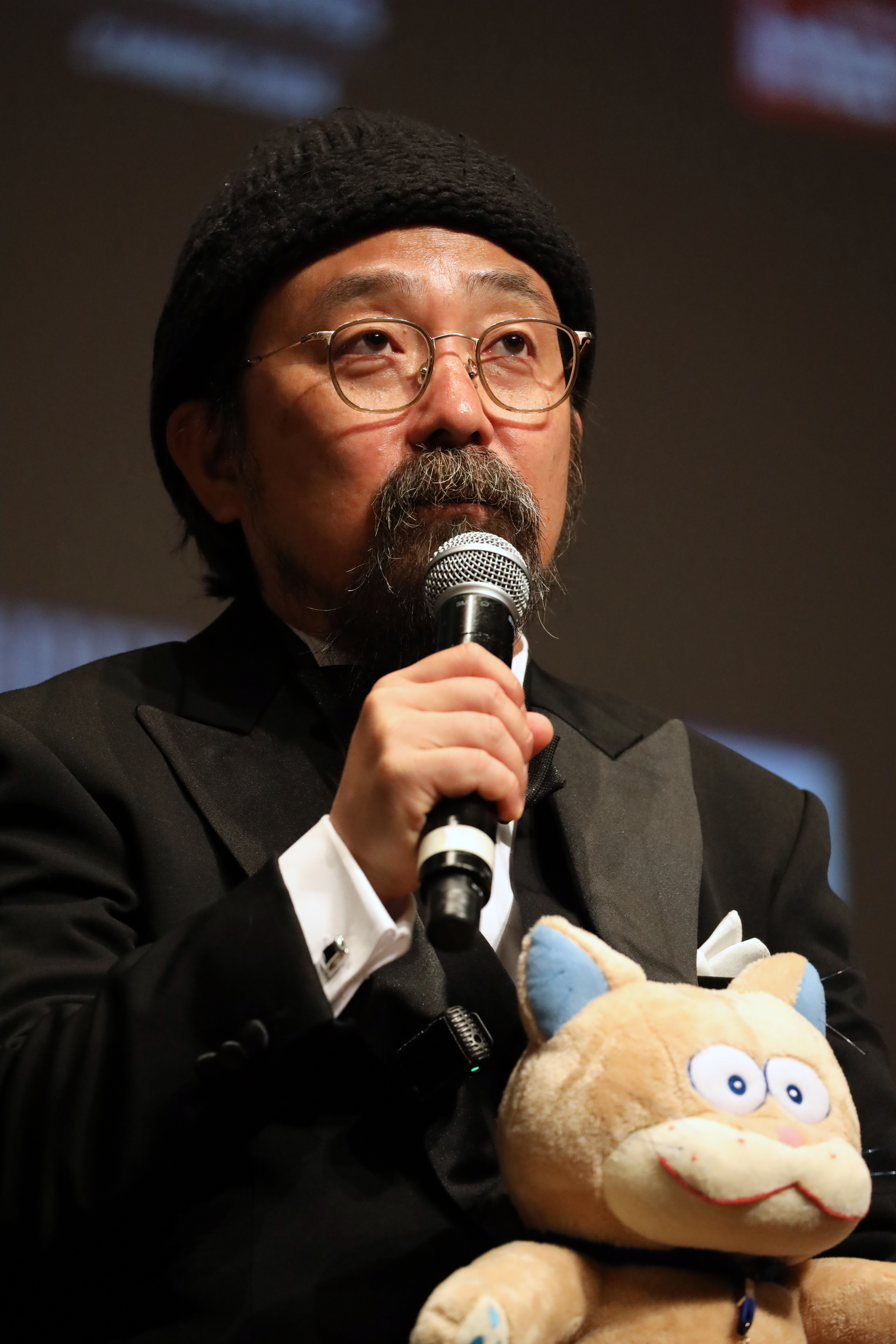
- Yamashita at the 2024 Cannes Film Festival for Ghost Cat Anzu
- Born: 29 August 1976 (age 50); Aichi, Japan
- Occupation: Film director

Nobuhiro Yamashita (山下敦弘, Yamashita Nobuhiro; born 29 August 1976) is a Japanese film director.

== Career ==
Born in Aichi Prefecture, Yamashita attended Osaka University of Arts where he worked on Kazuyoshi Kumakiri's Kichiku Dai Enkai. His graduation film Hazy Life, took the Off Theatre Competition Grand Prize at the 2000 Yubari International Fantastic Film Festival. He also won the award for Best Director at the 32nd Hochi Film Award in 2007 for A Gentle Breeze in the Village and The Matsugane Potshot Affair. He often works with the screenwriter Kōsuke Mukai.

== Filmography ==
=== Film ===
- Hazy Life (どんてん生活, Donten seikatsu) (1999)
- No One's Ark (ばかのハコ船, Baka no hakobune) (2003)
- Ramblers (リアリズムの宿, Riarizumu no yado) (2003)
- Cream Lemon (くりいむレモン, Kurîimu remon) (2004)
- Linda Linda Linda (2005)
- Ten Nights of Dreams (ユメ十夜, Yume Jū-ya) (2006) ominbus
- The Matsugane Potshot Affair (2006)
- A Gentle Breeze in the Village (2007)
- My Back Page (2011)
- The Drudgery Train (2012)
- Tamako in Moratorium (2013)
- La La La at Rock Bottom (2015)
- Over the Fence (2016)
- Boku no Ojisan (ぼくのおじさん) (2016)
- Hardcore (ハード・コア) (2018)
- Ghost Cat Anzu (2023)
- One Second Ahead, One Second Behind (2023)
- Let's Go Karaoke! (2024)
- Swimming in a Sand Pool (2024)
- Confession (2024)
- Ghost Cat Anzu (2024)

=== TV ===
- Midnight Diner (2009–2006)
- Modern Love Tokyo (2022, episode 3)
