= 2022 in Japanese television =

Below is a list of events affecting Japanese television in 2022.

== Events ==
Date	Event	Source
January 16	TV anime World Trigger postponed its third-season finale to next weekend due to a tsunami warning. It was replaced by a special regarding the tsunami.	
January 21	Hypnosis Mic: Division Rap Battle voice actor and Kamen Rider Revice actor Subaru Kimura photobombs a selfie of Akira creator Katsuhiro Otomo.	
January 26	A musical stage play based on Galaxy Express 999 has been adjusted and ticket sales were postponed due to Sayaka Kanda's death.	
January 31	Nickelodeon's Japanese channel closes.	
February 4 - February 20	The 2022 Winter Olympics was held in Beijing, China.	
February 27	Don't Toy with Me, Miss Nagatoro voice actress Sumire Uesaka was criticized due to her love for Russia.	
March 4	Pokémon voice actors Rica Matsumoto and Daiki Yamashita perform the fourth version of the anime's "1・2・3" opening, starting with the 2019 (Journeys) instalment's 100th episode.	
March 4 - March 13	The 2022 Winter Paralympics was held in Beijing, China.	
March 23	Former The IDOLM@STER voice actress Yurika announced that she might lose her home.	
April 9	Following the end of its broadcast on March 24, TV anime Norimono Man Mobile Land no Car-kun moved its initial timeslot from Thursdays to Saturdays.	
April 10	Bittomo × Heroine Kirameki Powers! changed its new episode length from 30 minutes to 15 minutes, making room for the new tokusatsu TV drama series RizSta -Top of Artists!-.	
April 22	Pokémon☆Sunday variety star Shoko Nakagawa fails her astronaut application.	
April 30	Pop Team Epic creator Bkub Okawa got married.	
May 4	Tokusou Sentai Dekaranger actor Yosuke Ito announces marriage with the partner he met on a dating app.	
May 8	Naoto Takenaka appears in a special program for Digimon Ghost Game.	
June 12	Former Hanamaru Kindergarten voice actress Maho Matsunaga becomes wheelchair-reliant after breaking her spinal cord during a suicide attempt.	
June 26	The tokusatsu Girls × Heroine Series ended after its 5th instalment, Bittomo × Heroine Kirameki Powers!, aired its final episode. RizSta -Top of Artists!-, a tokusatsu series related to the Girls × Heroine Series franchise, expands its episode length to 30 minutes, starting in the following week. (July 3)	
July 5	After 1 year and 4 months, NHK's Utacon broadcast again from NHK Hall.	
July 8	Following Shinzo Abe's assassination early that day, the second episode of the anime series Teppen—!!! broadcast had to be canceled with no new air date until August 2022 when it was set to be rescheduled to air on September 10, 2022.	
August 30	Due to her "bad behavior", Kamen Rider Revice actress Yui Asakura was fired from her agency.	
September 25	The 2022 MotoGP World Championship will be held at 2022 Japanese motorcycle Grand Prix.	
October 9	The 2022 Formula One World Championship will be held at 2022 Japanese Grand Prix.	
October 24	Hidekazu Tanaka, composer of the Aikatsu! and The IDOLM@STER Cinderella Girls and two versions of the Pokémon anime's 'Journeys' instalment's "1・2・3" opening, was arrested for an attempted sexual assault.	
November 1	Re:ZERO -Starting Life in Another World- voice actress Marika Kōno limits her activities after being diagnosed with adjustment disorder.	
November 11	Pokémon anime's debut protagonist Ash Ketchum has been congratulated for winning the Master's Eight tournament in the anime.	
November 20 - December 18	Ahead of Christmas 2022, the 2022 FIFA World Cup tournament was held in Qatar. It was won by Argentina.	
December 20	The Melancholy of Haruhi Suzumiya voice actress Aya Hirano claims that she's still receiving death threats from the fans.	

== Ongoing ==
Show	Type	Channel	First aired/Japanese period		Source
NHK
NHK Amateur Song Contest	Talent show	NHK-G, NHK World Premium	March 15, 1953 (TV)	Showa	
With Mother	Kids	E-TV, NHK World Premium	October 5, 1959	Showa	
Nintama Rantarō	Anime	NHK	April 10, 1993	Heisei	
Ojarumaru	Anime	NHK	October 5, 1998	Heisei	
Utacon	Music	NHK-G, NHK World Premium	April 12, 2016	Heisei	
Nippon Television Network System
Shōten	Comedy	Nippon Television	May 15, 1966	Showa	
Soreike! Anpanman	Anime	Nippon Television	October 3, 1988	Showa	
Downtown no Gaki no Tsukai ya Arahende!!	Game show	Nippon Television	October 3, 1989	Heisei	
Detective Conan	Anime	NNS	January 8, 1996	Heisei	
Fuji Network System
Music Fair	Music	Fuji TV	August 31, 1964	Showa	
Sazae-san	Anime	Fuji TV	October 5, 1969	Showa	
FNS Music Festival	Music	FNS	July 2, 1974	Showa	
Chibi Maruko-chan	Anime	Fuji TV	January 8, 1995	Heisei	
One Piece	Anime	Fuji TV	October 20, 1999	Heisei	
TV Tokyo
Boruto: Naruto Next Generations	Anime	TV Tokyo	April 5, 2017	Heisei	
Yo-kai Watch (2021 series)	Anime	TV Tokyo	April 9, 2021	Reiwa	
TV Asahi
Super Hero Time	Tokusatsu	TV Asahi	September 28, 2003	Heisei	
Crayon Shin-chan	Anime	TV Asahi	April 13, 1992	Heisei	
Doraemon	Anime	TV Asahi	April 15, 2005	Heisei	
Music Station	Music	TV Asahi	October 24, 1986	Showa	
Tokyo Broadcasting System
SASUKE	Sports	Tokyo Broadcasting System	September 26, 1997	Heisei	
Count Down TV	Music	Tokyo Broadcasting System	April 7, 1993	Heisei	

== New series and returning shows ==
Show	Network	Premiere	Finale	Status	Source
Police in a Pod (TV anime)	Tokyo MX	January 5, 2022	March 30, 2022	Series Ended	
Saiyuki Reload: Zeroin	Tokyo MX	January 6, 2022	March 31, 2022	Series Ended	
Orient	TV Tokyo	January 6, 2022	March 24, 2022	Season Ended; Renewed for Season 2	
Tokyo 24th Ward	Tokyo MX	January 6, 2022	April 7, 2022	Series Ended	
Ninjala	TV Tokyo	January 8, 2022	Currently Airing	Continues 2023	
CUE!	TBS	January 8, 2022	June 25, 2022	Series Ended	
Miss Kuroitsu from the Monster Development Department	TV Asahi	January 9, 2022	April 3, 2022	Series Ended	
The 13 Lords of the Shogun	NHK	January 9, 2022	December 18, 2022	Series Ended	
Attack on Titan: The Final Season (part 2)	NHK	January 10, 2022	April 4, 2022	Season Ended; Renewed for Final Season part 3	
On Air Dekinai!	TV Tokyo	January 10, 2022	March 28, 2022	Series Ended	
Tribe Nine	Tokyo MX	January 10, 2022	March 28, 2022	Series Ended	
GaruGaku II: Lucky Stars	TV Tokyo	January 10, 2022	March 18, 2022	Series Ended	
Fantasia Sango	BS12	January 11, 2022	March 29, 2022	Series Ended	
Sabikui Bisco	Tokyo MX	January 11, 2022	March 29, 2022	Season Ended; Renewed for Season 2	
Life with an Ordinary Guy who Reincarnated into a Total Fantasy Knockout	TV Tokyo	January 12, 2022	March 30, 2022	Series Ended	
I'm Kodama Kawashiri	Fuji TV	January 14, 2022	August 12, 2022	Series Ended	
Rokuhōdō Yotsuiro Biyori (Live-action series)	TV Asahi	January 15, 2022	March 19, 2022	Series Ended	
Ultraman Chronicle D	TV Tokyo	January 29, 2022	June 25, 2022	Series Ended	
Salaryman's Club	TV Asahi	January 30, 2022	April 17, 2022	Series Ended	
Sweat and Soap	MBS	February 3, 2022	April 1, 2022	Series Ended	
Hairpin Double	BS-Fuji	February 4, 2022		Series Ended	
Delicious Party Pretty Cure	TV Asahi	February 6, 2022	January 29, 2023	Ending 2023	
Love is Blind: Japan	Netflix	February 8, 2022	February 22, 2022	Series Ended	
Short Program	Amazon Prime Video	March 1, 2022	March 14, 2022	Series Ended	
Avataro Sentai Donbrothers	TV Asahi	March 6, 2022	February 26, 2023	Ending 2023	
I Want to Hold Aono-kun so Badly I Could Die	Wowow	March 18, 2022	May 20, 2022	Series Ended	
Shadowverse Flame	TV Tokyo	April 2, 2022	Currently Airing	Continues 2023	
Love All Play	Nippon TV	April 2, 2022	September 24, 2022	Series Ended	
Aharen-san wa Hakarenai	TBS	April 2, 2022	June 18, 2022	Season Ended; Renewed for Season 2	
Black Rock Shooter: Dawn Fall	Tokyo MX	April 3, 2022	June 19, 2022	Series Ended	
Where are we going with Pokémon?!	TV Tokyo	April 3, 2022	Currently Airing	Continues 2023	
Cap Kakumei Bottleman DX	TV Osaka	April 3, 2022	March 26, 2023	Ending 2023	
Yu-Gi-Oh! Go Rush!!	TV Tokyo	April 3, 2022	Currently Airing	Continues 2023	
Magia Record: Dawn of a Shallow Dream	Tokyo MX	April 3, 2022		Series Ended	
Trapped in a Dating Sim: The World of Otome Games is Tough for Mobs	Tokyo MX	April 3, 2022	June 19, 2022	Series Ended	
Healer Girl	Tokyo MX	April 4, 2022	June 20, 2022	Series Ended	
Ya Boy Kongming!	Tokyo MX	April 5, 2022	June 21, 2022	Series Ended	
I'm Quitting Heroing	Tokyo MX	April 5, 2022	June 21, 2022	Series Ended	
RPG Real Estate	Tokyo MX	April 6, 2022	June 22, 2022	Series Ended	
Deaimon	Tokyo MX	April 6, 2022	June 22, 2022	Series Ended	
Murai no Koi	TBS	April 6, 2022	May 25, 2022	Series Ended	
Heroine Tarumono!	Tokyo MX	April 7, 2022	June 23, 2022	Series Ended	
Miss Shachiku and the Little Baby Ghost	Tokyo MX	April 7, 2022	June 23, 2022	Series Ended	
Komi Can't Communicate (Season 2)	TV Tokyo	April 7, 2022	June 23, 2022	Series Ended	
The Dawn of the Witch	TBS	April 8, 2022	July 1, 2022	Series Ended	
Love After World Domination	Tokyo MX	April 8, 2022	June 24, 2022	Series Ended	
The Demon Girl Next Door 2-Chōme	TBS	April 8, 2022	July 1, 2022	Series Ended	
AKB48 Sayonara Mōri-san	Nippon TV	April 8, 2022	March 23, 2023	Ending 2023	
Spy × Family	TV Tokyo	April 9, 2022	June 25, 2022	Season Ended; Part 2 to debut later	
Kaguya-sama: Love Is War -Ultra Romantic-	Tokyo MX	April 9, 2022	June 25, 2022	Season Ended	
RizSta -Top of Artists!-	TV Tokyo	April 10, 2022	December 25, 2022	Series Ended	
Chimudondon	NHK	April 11, 2022	September 30, 2022	Series Ended	
Onipan!	TV Tokyo	April 11, 2022	July 1, 2022	Series Ended	
Ashita, Watashi wa Dareka no Kanojo	TBS	April 13, 2022	June 29, 2022	Series Ended	
Kaginado (Season 2)	Tokyo MX	April 13, 2022	June 29, 2022	Series Ended	
Summer Time Rendering	Tokyo MX	April 15, 2022	September 30, 2022	Series Ended	
Koi ni Mudaguchi	TV Asahi	April 17, 2022	June 19, 2022	Series Ended	
He's Expecting	Netflix	April 21, 2022		Season Ended	
Double	Wowow	June 4, 2022	August 6, 2022	Series Ended	
Phantom of the Idol	TV Tokyo	July 1, 2022	September 3, 2022	Series Ended	
Lycoris Recoil	Tokyo MX	July 2, 2022	September 24, 2022	Series Ended	
Teppen—!!!!!!!!!!!!!!! Laughing 'til you Cry	Tokyo MX	July 2, 2022	September 24, 2022	Series Ended	
Iii Icecrin 2	TV Tokyo	July 2, 2022	September 17, 2022	Season Ended	
Rent-A-Girlfriend (Live-action series)	TV Asahi	July 3, 2022	September 25, 2022	Series Ended	
Kinsō no Vermeil	Tokyo MX	July 5, 2022	September 20, 2022	Series Ended	
Tokyo Mew Mew New	TV Tokyo	July 6, 2022	September 21, 2022	Season Ended; Renewed for Season 2	
Dropkick on My Devil! X	TV Tokyo	July 6, 2022	September 21, 2022	Season Ended	
Made in Abyss: The Sun Blazes Upon the Golden City	Tokyo MX	July 6, 2022	September 28, 2022	Season Ended	
Call of the Night	Fuji TV	July 8, 2022	September 30, 2022	Season Ended	
Shine On! Bakumatsu Boys	Tokyo MX	July 8, 2022	September 23, 2022	Series Ended	
Ultraman Decker	TV Tokyo	July 9, 2022	January 21, 2023	Ending 2023	
Lucifer and the Biscuit Hammer	TBS	July 9, 2022	December 24, 2022	Series Ended	
Prima Doll	Tokyo MX	July 9, 2022	September 24, 2022	Series Ended	
Parallel World Pharmacy	Tokyo MX	July 10, 2022	September 25, 2022	Series Ended	
Extreme Hearts	Tokyo MX	July 10, 2022	September 25, 2022	Series Ended	
Orient (Season 2)	TV Tokyo	July 12, 2022	September 27, 2022	Series Ended	
Shine Post	NTV	July 13, 2022	October 19, 2022	Series Ended	
Love Live! Superstar!! (Season 2)	NHK-E	July 17, 2022	October 9, 2022	Season Ended	
The Maid I Hired Recently Is Mysterious	TV Asahi	July 24, 2022	October 9, 2022	Series Ended	
Fuuto PI	Tokyo MX	August 8, 2022	October 17, 2022	Series Ended	
Rilakkuma's Theme Park Adventure	Netflix	August 25, 2022		Series Ended	
Kamen Rider Geats	TV Asahi	September 4, 2022	Currently Airing	Continues 2023	
Duel Masters Win	TV Tokyo	September 4, 2022	March 26, 2023	Ending 2023	
Spy × Family (Part 2)	TV Tokyo	October 1, 2022	December 24, 2022	Season Ended; Renewed for Season 2	
I'm the Villainess, So I'm Taming the Final Boss	Tokyo MX	October 1, 2022	December 17, 2022	Series Ended	
My Hero Academia (Season 6)	Nippon TV	October 1, 2022	March 25, 2023	Ending 2023	
Beast Tamer	Tokyo MX	October 2, 2022	December 25, 2022	Series Ended	
Maiagare!	NHK	October 3, 2022	March 31, 2023	Ending 2023	
Encouragement of Climb: Next Summit	Tokyo MX	October 4, 2022	December 21, 2022	Series Ended	
Reincarnated as a Sword	Tokyo MX	October 5, 2022	December 21, 2022	Season Ended; Renewed for Season 2	
Do It Yourself!!	TV Tokyo	October 5, 2022	December 22, 2022	Series Ended	
Uncle from Another World	AT-X	October 6, 2022 (Note: Originally started on July 6, 2022)	March 8, 2023	Ending 2023	
Megaton Musashi (Season 2)	Tokyo MX	October 7, 2022	March 3, 2023	Ending 2023	
Blue Lock	TV Asahi	October 8, 2022	March 26, 2023	Ending 2023	
Welcome to Demon School! Iruma-kun (3rd season)	NHK-E	October 8, 2022	March 4, 2023	Ending 2023	
Bleach: Thousand-Year Blood War	TV Tokyo	October 11, 2022	Currently Airing	Continues 2023	
Chainsaw Man	TV Tokyo	October 12, 2022	December 28, 2022	Series Ended	
Love Flops	Tokyo MX	October 12, 2022	December 28, 2022	Series Ended	
Urusei Yatsura (2022 series)	Fuji TV	October 14, 2022	March 24, 2023	Ending 2023; Renewed for Season 2 in 2024	
To Your Eternity (Season 2)	NHK	October 23, 2022	March 12, 2023	Season Ended; Renewed for Season 3	
Arknights: Prelude to Dawn	TV Tokyo	October 28, 2022	December 17, 2022	Season Ended	
Takahashi from the Bike Shop	TV Tokyo	November 3, 2022	December 22, 2022	Series Ended	
Plus-Sized Misadventures in Love!	Tokyo MX	November 7, 2022	December 26, 2022	Season Ended	
Alice in Borderland (Season 2)	Netflix	December 22, 2022		Season Ended	

== Ending ==
End date	Show	Channel	First aired	Replaced by	Source
January 22	Ultraman Trigger	TV Tokyo	July 10, 2021	Ultraman Chronicle D	
January 23	Who Is Princess?	NTV	October 5, 2021	TBA	
January 30	Tropical-Rouge! Pretty Cure	TV Asahi	February 28, 2021	Delicious Party Pretty Cure	
February 27	Kikai Sentai Zenkaiger	TV Asahi	March 7, 2021	Avataro Sentai Donbrothers	
March 18	Shinkansen Henkei Robo Shinkalion Z	TV Tokyo	April 9, 2021	Big Hunter	
March 18	Beyblade Burst Dynamite Battle	YouTube	April 2, 2021	N/A	
March 19	Shibuya Note	NHK	April 24, 2016	Venue101	
March 24	Norimono Man Mobile Land no Car-kun	NHK-E	April 2, 2020	TBA	
March 25	Platinum End	TBS	October 8, 2021	The Demon Girl Next Door 2-Chōme	
March 25	Ranking of Kings	Fuji TV	October 15, 2021	Tatami Time Machine Blues	
March 26	Yashahime: Princess Half-Demon	Nippon TV	October 3, 2020	Love All Play	
March 27	Meet Up at the Pokémon House?	TV Tokyo	October 4, 2015	Where are we going with Pokémon?!	
March 27	Mazica Party	TV Osaka	April 4, 2021	Cap Kakumei Bottleman DX	
March 27	Yu-Gi-Oh! Sevens	TV Tokyo	April 4, 2020	Yu-Gi-Oh! Go Rush!!	
March 27	Mewkledreamy Mix!	TV Tokyo	April 11, 2021	Golf no Kizune	
April 8	Come Come Everybody	NHK	November 1, 2021	Chimudondon	
April 21	Shaman King (2021 series)	TV Tokyo	April 1, 2021	Memory Investigation 2-Shinjuku East Office Case File- (rerun)	
June 25	Cue!	TBS	January 8, 2022	Lucifer and the Biscuit Hammer	
June 25	Ultraman Chronicle D	TV Tokyo	January 29, 2022	Ultraman Decker	
June 26	Bittomo × Heroine Kirameki Powers!	TV Tokyo	July 11, 2021	RizSta -Top of Artists!- Expanded to 30 minutes	
August 28	Kamen Rider Revice	TV Asahi	September 5, 2021	Kamen Rider Geats	
September 24	Love All Play	Nippon TV	April 2, 2022	My Hero Academia (Season 6)	
September 30	Chimudondon	NHK	April 11, 2022	Maiagare!	
September 30	Call of the Night	Fuji TV	July 8, 2022	Urusei Yatsura (2022 series)	
October 9	Waccha PriMagi!	TV Tokyo	October 3, 2021	Strawberry Prince: Here! We! GO!! (Note: Between Wacca PriMagi! and Strawberry Prince: Here! We! GO!!, a few episodes of the documentary series, Norenai tetsudō ni notte mita!, were broadcast on TV Tokyo's Sunday 10am timeslot)	
October 22	Dragon Quest: The Adventure of Dai	TV Tokyo	October 3, 2020	Shadowverse Flame (Note: This is a timeslot change for Shadowverse Flame. Before October 29, 2022, this anime was originally broadcast on TV Tokyo between 10:00 and 10:30)	
December 16	Pokémon ('Journeys' series)	TV Tokyo	November 17, 2019	Pokémon: Mezase Pokémon Master (Note: Described as the "final chapter" in Ash and Pikachu's story, this is a special 11-episode series)	
December 18	The 13 Lords of the Shogun	NHK	January 9, 2022	What Will You Do, Ieyasu?	
December 24	Lucifer and the Biscuit Hammer	TBS	July 9, 2022	Endo and Kobayashi Live! The Latest on Tsundere Villainess Lieselotte	
December 25	RizSta -Top of Artists!-	TV Tokyo	April 10, 2022	RizSta Selection (Note: Some of the RizSta -Top of Artists!- episodes rerun under RiSta Selection from January 2023 to March 2023)	

== Sports ==
Airdate	Sports	Network	Source
February 4 - February 20	2022 Winter Olympics	NHK	
September 25	2022 MotoGP World Championship	G+	
October 9	2022 Formula One World Championship	Fuji TV Next	
November 20 - December 18	2022 FIFA World Cup	Abema TV, Fuji TV, TV Asahi, NHK	

== Special events and milestone episodes ==
Airdate	Show	Episode	Network	Source
January 1	Animelo Summer Live 2021: Colors		BS Fuji	
January 21 - January 28	Pokémon	Pokémon: Arceus, the One Called a God (4-parter)	Amazon Prime Video	
March 4	Pokémon	2019 (Journeys) series #100 "A Full Coverage of Dande's Special Training!!"	TV Tokyo	
April 1	Pokémon	Double episode 25th Anniversary special	TV Tokyo	
May 1	Chibi Maruko-chan	Episode #1500	Fuji TV	
May 8	Digimon Ghost Game	Digimon Ghost Game Special: The Mysterious World Talked by Naoto Takenaka	Fuji TV	
June 3	Pokémon	Episode 1200: ""The Last Mission! Catch Regieleki and Regidorago!!""	TV Tokyo	
June 11	Geinin Anime Kantoku		Fuji TV	
July 10	Dr. Stone	Dr. Stone: Ryusui	Tokyo MX	
September 3	Teppen—!!!!!!!!!!!!!!! Laughing 'til you Cry	Funded special episode	Tokyo MX	
September 10	Teppen—!!!!!!!!!!!!!!! Laughing 'til you Cry	Rescheduled broadcast of 2nd episode ("The Cattle Chapter")	Tokyo MX	
October 22	Dragon Quest: The Adventure of Dai	#100 (Series Finale) "Farewell! The Beloved Earth"	TV Tokyo	
December 31	73rd NHK Kōhaku Uta Gassen		NHK	
December 31	Johnny's Countdown 2022-2023		Fuji Television	

== Deaths ==
Date	Name	Age	Notable Works	Source
January 9	Akira Inore	93	Director (Nemuri Kyōshirō)	
January 10	Shinji Mizushima	82	Original creator (Dokaben)	
January 20	Hideo Onchi	88	Director (Kizu darake no tenshi)	
February 6	Saki Nitta	31	Voice actress (Kill la Kill, D.Gray-man Hallow)	
February 8	Toshiya Ueda	88	Voice actor (Pretty Soldier Sailor Moon, Pokémon, The Adventures of Pepero)	
February 20	Teruhiko Saigō	75	Actor (Shadow Warriors)	
February 26	Yūsuke Kawazu	86	Actor (G-Men '75, Wild 7 (1972 TV series))	
February 28	Norihiro Inoue	63	Voice actor (Code Geass, Negima!?)	
March 3	Kyotaro Nishimura	91	Original creator (Inspector Totsugawa)	
March 7	Mia Ikumi	42	Original creator (Super Doll Licca-chan, Tokyo Mew Mew)	
March 14	Tsunanori Sakaguchi	86	Calligrapher (Demon Slayer: Kimetsu no Yaiba)	
March 14	Akira Takarada	87	Actor (Watashi no Aozora, Carnation), dubbing actor (Disney's House of Mouse)	
March 21	Shinji Aoyama	57	Director, screenwriter (Shiritsu tantei Hama Maiku)	
March 31	Kei Yamamoto	81	Actor (Hitotsu Yane no Shita, Yae's Sakura)	
April 5	Fujiko Fujio A	88	Original creator (The Laughing Salesman, Ninja Hattori-kun), co-creator (Doraemon)	
April 8	Minori Matsushima	81	Voice actress (Ranma ½, Candy Candy, Maison Ikkoku)	
April 16	Mio Murao	69	Character designer (Seishun Anime Zenshu)	
April 18	Shirō Sasaki	83	Anime producer (Noir)	
May 3	Hiroyuki Watanabe	66	Actor (GARO, Ultraman Gaia, Aoi)	
May 11	Ryuhei Ueshima	61	Comedian (Dachō Club), actor	
June 8	Kousuke Takeuchi	45	Voice actor (The Prince of Tennis, Eyeshield 21, Duel Masters Victory)	
June 11	Kumiko Takizawa	69	Voice actress (Ojamajo Doremi, Wedding Peach), dubbing actress (Grey's Anatomy)	
June 23	Chumei Watanabe	96	Composer (Transformers: Victory, Getter Robo Go, Mazinger Z)	
June 27	Teruyoshi Nakano	86	Special effects director (Zone Fighter)	
July 4	Kazuki Takahashi	60	Original creator (Yu-Gi-Oh!)	
July 8	Shinzo Abe	67	Former prime minister	
July 25	Yoko Shimada	69	Actress (Kamen Rider, Oka no Ue no Himawari)	
July 30	Kiyoshi Kobayashi	89	Voice actor (Space Cobra, Death Note)	
August 1	Hiroshi Ōtake	90	Voice actor (Pāman, Pokémon, Hunter × Hunter (2011)), actor (Robot Detective, Gekisō Sentai Carranger)	
August 7	Yoshifumi Ushima	55	Theme song performer (Mobile Fighter G Gundam, H2)	
August 17	Motomu Kiyokawa	87	Voice actor (Pokémon, Restaurant to Another World, Cardcaptor Sakura), actor (Battle Fever J), dubbing actor (Twin Peaks)	
August 25	Shichirō Kobayashi	89	Animation art director (Ashita no Joe 2, Nodame Cantabile, Ganso Tensai Bakabon)	
September 5	Sizzle Ohtaka	69	Theme song performer (Hotarubi no Mori e, I'm Gonna Be An Angel!)	
September 12	Ryuji Mizuno	70	Voice actor (Naruto, Zombie Land Saga Revenge, B't X)	
October 5	Shinsuke Chikaishi	91	Voice actor (Wonder Three, Sazae-san, Osomatsu-kun)	
October 13	Yoshitaka Kohno	??	Animator (Magical Canan (TV series), Magical Project S, Demon Slayer: Kimetsu no Yaiba, Bleach), character designer	
December 6	Ichiro Mizuki	74	Singer and founder member of JAM Project (Spielvan, Metalder, Mazinger Z)	
December 12	Gosaku Ota	74	Original creator (Groizer X)	
December 18	Hitomi Suzuki	26	Idol and voice actress, former member of Fuwafuwa and NOW ON AIR	
December 25	Yuji Nunokawa	75	Founder of Studio Pierrot (Yū Yū Hakusho, Osomatsu-kun, Black Clover)	

== See also ==
- 2022 in British television
- 2022 in Philippine television
- 2022 in television
