= Sumire Matsubara =

Japanese actress, singer and model

Sumire
- すみれ
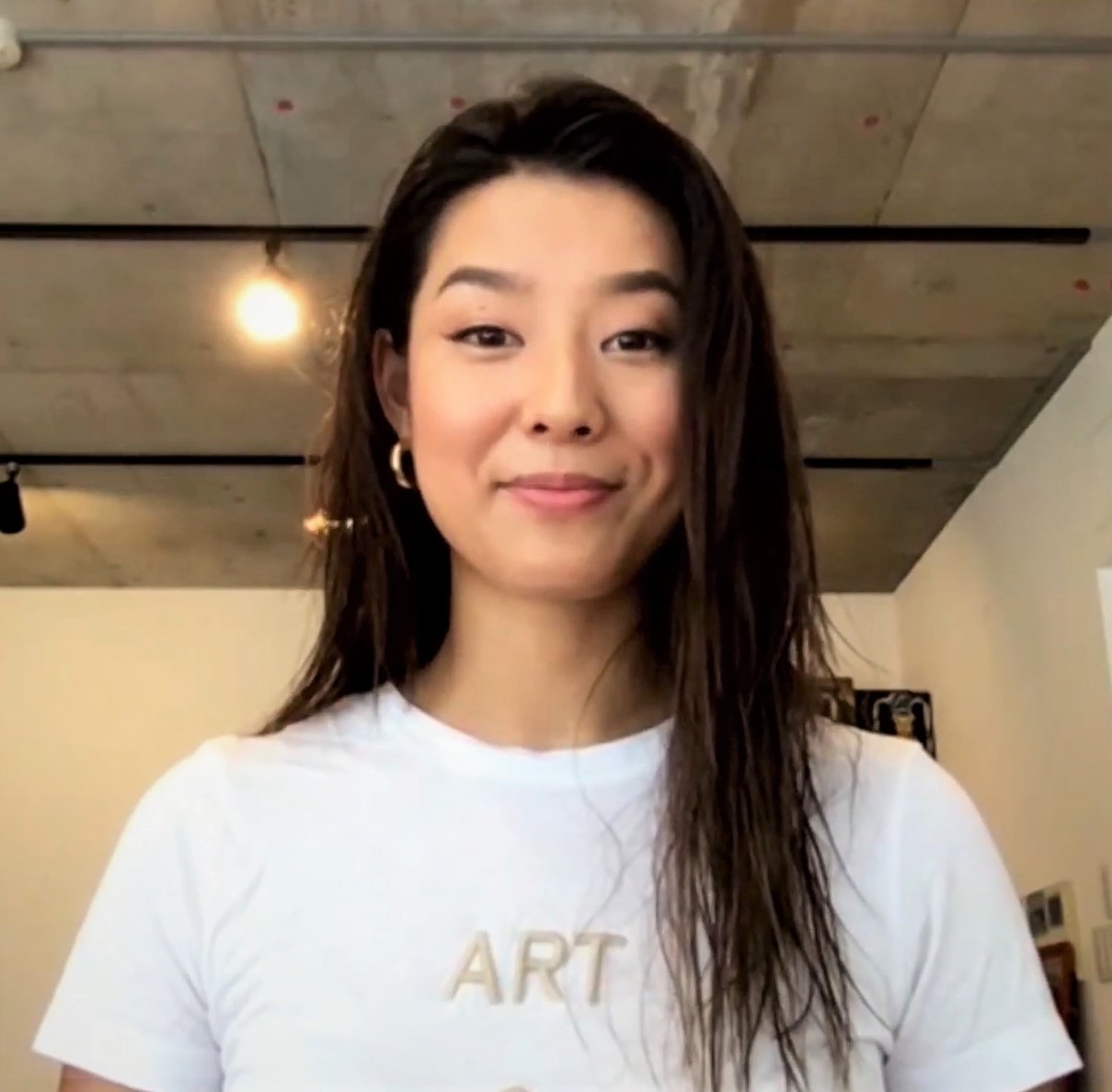
- Sumire in 2020
- Born: Sumire Matsubara; July 15, 1990 (age 36); Tokyo, Japan
- Education: Punahou School; Carnegie Mellon University
- Occupations: Actress; Singer; Fashion model
- Years active: 2006–present
- Agents: Sky Corporation (entertainment activities and advertising); Bon Image (fashion shows and magazines)
- Height: 1.75 m (5 ft 9 in)
- Children: 1
- Parents: Junichi Ishida (father); Chiaki Matsubara (mother)
- Relatives: Issei Ishida

Japanese name
- Kanji: 松原 すみれ
- Hiragana: まつばら すみれ
- Katakana: マツバラ スミレ
Transcriptions
- Romanization: Matsubara Sumire

Sumire Matsubara (松原 すみれ, Matsubara Sumire; born July 15, 1990, in Tokyo), better known mononymously as Sumire (すみれ), is a Japanese actress, singer and fashion model.

== Early life and education ==
Sumire was born in Japan to entertainers Junichi Ishida and Chiaki Matsubara (1958–2022). Sumire's half-brother is actor Issei Ishida. By the time Sumire was seven years old, her parents had divorced, and she moved from Japan to Hawaii with her mother.

Sumire recalled that her mother "would often take me to see musicals, Disney movies, and we would go karaoke together and perform for each other". She enrolled in her school's choir and eventually starred in a Punahou School production of the musical West Side Story. Sumire was accepted to Carnegie Mellon University in Pittsburgh, Pennsylvania, where she pursued a Bachelor of Fine Arts in musical theater and acting. She later complimented the school's conservatory program but noted that she "did feel some racial discrimination from the people of the town. After being in the school, it was amazing, but something in me was telling me that this place was not the place for me."

Following the death of her grandmother in 2010 and the Tōhoku earthquake and tsunami in 2011, Sumire returned to Hawaii to live with her mother. She later moved back to Tokyo.

== Career ==
Sumire is represented by the Japanese talent agency Sky Corporation (for entertainment activities and advertising). In 2014, Sumire guest starred on Hawaii Five-0 as tour bus robber Keilani Makua in the episode "Kanalu Hope Loa".

In 2017, Sumire made her Hollywood debut in the American Christian drama The Shack where she played the role of Holy Spirit (Sarayu). In 2019, she appeared in the sports movie The Brighton Miracle which depicts Japan's performance at the 2015 Rugby World Cup. Sumire played the role of Satomi Leitch, who is married to Michael Leitch and captain of the Japanese rugby team.

In 2021, she became a One Young World Japan Honorary Delegate.

== Personal life ==
Sumire was baptized as an infant and attended church at an early age. She attended a Catholic elementary school in Hawaii before joining Punahou School.

On November 25, 2021, Sumire announced on her Instagram that she had married a businessman on November 12. At the same time, Sumire also announced she was pregnant with her first child. On April 30, 2022, she gave birth to a healthy baby boy.

== Filmography ==
=== Films ===
Year	Title	Role	Notes	Ref(s)
2016	Hold My Hand (Te wo tsunaide kaerôyo) (手をつないでかえろうよ〜シャングリラの向こうで〜)	Reiko Takeuchi		
2017	The Shack	Holy Spirit (Sarayu)	Asian World Film Festival - Rising Star Award (2015)	
2019	The Brighton Miracle	Satomi Leitch		
2024	Rules of Living	Chieko		
2025	Ice on the Moon	Koharu		

=== TV series ===
==== Variety ====
Year	Title	Network	Notes	Ref(s)
2007	Attention Please	TV	Honolulu special episode	
2011	Waratte Iitomo!	Fuji TV		
2013	Shin Chūbōdesu Yo!	TBS	Regular	
2014	All-Star Thanksgiving	TBS		
2014	Viking	Fuji TV	Tuesday regular	

==== Drama ====
Year	Title	Role	Notes	Ref(s)
2014	Hawaii Five-0	Keilani Makua	Episode: "Kanalu Hope Loa"	
2014	Soko o Nantoka	Eiko Mizoguchi	Episode: "Episode 2"	
2014	Cabin Attendant Keiji: New York Satsujin Jiken (キャビンアテンダント刑事)	Megumi Fujisawa	Television film	
2015	Ichiro (一路#テレビドラマ)	Otohime	Episode 4	
2015	Hagane no Keisatsu-i (諏訪のスゴ腕警察医)	Kaede Ishinomori		
2016	Kamogawa shokudô (鴨川食堂)	Hatsuko Shirasaki		
2017	Inhumans	Locus	3 episodes	

=== Theatre ===
Year	Title	Role	Notes	Ref(s)
2013	Nito Monogatari (二都物語)	Lucy Manet	Imperial Theatre	
2013	Anything Goes (エニシング・ゴーズ (ミュージカル))	Hope Harcourt	Imperial Theatre	
2015	Bombay Dreams	Priya	Umeda Arts Theater	

== Discography ==
Studio albums
Title	Details
Kumo No Ue Ha Itsumo Hare	Released: 8 November 2017; Label: SSS Records

As lead artist

Title	Year	Album
"Start Line"	2017	Kumo No Ue Ha Itsumo Hare
"Canvas"	2017	Kumo No Ue Ha Itsumo Hare
"Mijuku"	2017	Kumo No Ue Ha Itsumo Hare
"100°C"	2017	Kumo No Ue Ha Itsumo Hare
"Todoke"	2017	Kumo No Ue Ha Itsumo Hare
"Hitori"	2017	Kumo No Ue Ha Itsumo Hare
"Makenaide"	2017	Kumo No Ue Ha Itsumo Hare
"I Know Only You"	2018	I Know Only You - EP
"Stand By Me"	2018	I Know Only You - EP
"I Was Made For You"	2018	I Know Only You - EP
"Love Untold"	2020	Love Untold - Single
"Still Stay Here"	2020	Love Untold - Single
"Tsuki No Koori"	2020	Love Untold - Single
"Picture Frames (feat. Untorn)"	2020	-
"Home"	2020	Home - EP
"Home (Japanese)"	2020	Home - EP
"Wanna Be Free (feat. 110kid)"	2021	-
"Melody of Love"	2021	-
"CONMAN (with SHIMA)"	2021	-
