= Issei Ishida =

Japanese actor and musician (born 1974)

- いしだ 壱成
- Born: 7 December 1974 (age 51); Tokyo, Japan
- Other names: Issei Hoshikawa (real name); iSSEi iSHiDa (name as DJ)
- Citizenship: Japan
- Occupations: Actor; musician
- Years active: 1992–2001; 2003–present
- Television: Under the Same Roof; Miseinen; Seija no Kōshin; Daisuke Hanamura
- Spouses: Emi Miyake (m. 2003; div. 2006); Takako Iimura (m. 2018; div. 2021)
- Parents: Junichi Ishida (father); Mari Hoshikawa (mother)
- Relatives: Sumire; Takeshi Ishida (grandfather)

Issei Ishida (いしだ 壱成, Ishida Issei; born 7 December 1974), real name Issei Hoshikawa (星川 一星, Hoshikawa Issei; né Ishida (石田)), is a Japanese actor and musician.

== Personal life ==
Ishida was born in Tokyo. His father is actor Junichi Ishida, and his mother is Mari Hoshikawa is an author and translator as well as the director of the Fuchuu City, Tokyo branch of Greens Japan, focusing on denuclearization activism. His uncle, Jun Hoshikawa, was the executive director of Greenpeace Japan. His half-sister is the model Sumire. His paternal grandfather was former NHK announcer, Takeshi Ishida, and his great-grandfather was Taketaro Ishida, a reporter for the former Chūgai Shōgyō Shinpō (now The Nikkei). His aunt is a musician, Momoko Ishida.

=== Early life ===
His father, Junichi, married Mari Hoshikawa when they were students. Issei was born when his parents were twenty years old. His parents divorced when he was three, and he was raised by his mother, with his paternal grandfather Takeshi becoming a substitute for his father. Ishida grew up moving from one place to another such as Yakushima, Yatsugatake, and Oregon in the United States.

=== Entertainment world ===
==== Scoop articles ====
In 1991, a scandal broke about his father, Junichi Ishida, who was making appearances in "trendy dramas" at the time, and became popular as a "trendy actor." In the women's weekly magazine Josei Seven, the article "Junichi Ishida's secret child" was published as a tabloid rumor on the existence of Issei. Junichi acknowledged the rumor, stating that "The term 'hidden' is misleading. [Mari] just chose not to say anything."

==== Acting debut ====
Issei was noticed by a television program producer who happened to be present when he was at one of his aunt's concerts, and subsequently appeared in the "Fuji TV–The Television Tenth Anniversary Drama Special" Kanashī hodo Otenki. He received attention for his androgynous appearance, gaining the nickname "Femio" (フェミ男). He later appeared in the same station's "Boku-tachi no Drama" series, Hōkago. After that, he also appeared in hit works such as Under the Same Roof and Seija no Kōshin.

==== Music debut ====
His music career started with his debut album "Warning" from Warner Music Japan in 1994. The album won a Gold Disk. He later released two other albums. He had been in bands since before he started acting and used this experience to form "The Big Band!!" (along with DJ Dragon, Shinji Takeda, and others) where he was keyboardist and vocalist. They debuted "Hot Road 1996" from Warner Music Japan in 1996, and performed live at Akasaka Blitz.

==== Arrest ====
On 20 August 2001, he was arrested for violation of the Cannabis Control Law because he was caught in possession of cannabis and LSD. He was given a suspended sentence.

==== Cheating scandal and subsequent firing ====
He later returned to acting in 2003 after a two-year probation period. After that, he resumed activities centered on music, films, and theatre.

On 26 January 2009, it was discovered that he was cheating on Chiharu Kawai with another woman. According to mass media coverage, the woman was pregnant with Ishida's child. After the scandal was brought to light, she lost contact with him and subsequently got an abortion. She attempted suicide three times.

His affiliated office also acknowledged that "dating is not a game", and announced that Ishida would be indefinitely suspended from acting.

==== After dismissal ====
He traveled to China in 2010, performing as an extra in various films and TV dramas, later appearing as Yan Hui in the Chinese historical drama Confucius.

In his blog just before the Tōhoku earthquake and tsunami, he discussed being beaten by a member of the Riot Police Unit at 11 years old for participating in a nuclear power phase-out movement with his mother, and revealed that he was called "Raji," which is his Catholic baptismal name.

In 2012, he made various appearances on different television programs; such as Hitoshi Matsumoto no Suberanai Hanashi (23rd edition), Masahiro Nakai no Kinyōbi no Suma-tachi e, Jinsei ga Kawaru 1-funkan no Fukaī Hanashi, Down Town DX: 20-Shūnen Special, and Cream Quiz Miracle 9.

In 2013, he appeared in Soul Dreams at the Tokyo Metropolitan Theatre, and in October, he was the protagonist of People Theater's 58th Performance of Ezo-chi Bekken at the same theatre.

In April 2018, he announced that he was getting married for the third time. His new wife, actress Takako Iimura, was 24 years younger. Iimura also announced her pregnancy. Initially, they planned to submit their marriage forms on the 9th, but Iimura postponed it because she developed acute back pain, and their submission was made later, on the 18th.

In December 2021, he announced that he and Iimura had divorced.

== Biography timeline ==
- 1992 – Acting debut in Kanashī hodo Otenki.
- 1993 – He played the third son, Kazuya in Under the Same Roof.
- 1995 – He won the Television Drama Academy Award Best Actor Award for Miseinen.
- 20 August 2001 – He resigned from the stage play Oh! Edo Rocket, and stopped his entertainment activities.
- 2003 – He returned to acting.
- 17 December 2003 – He married former tv personality, Emi Miyake.
- 30 January 2006 – He divorced Miyake.
- 31 January 2009 – He was fired by his affiliated office.
- 2012 – He moves to Ishikawa Prefecture.
- 14 July 2014 – He married a non-celebrity woman who was eleven years younger.
- 18 October 2017 – He announced his second divorce.
- 2018 – He married again with Takako Iimura, who was 24 years younger while expecting his second child.
- 2021 – He divorced Iimura.

== Major appearances ==
=== TV dramas ===
- Kanashī hodo Otenki (1992, CX)
- Boku-tachi no Drama Series Hōkago (1992, Kyodo Television–CX) – as Kohei Takamoto
- Under the Same Roof (Apr–Jun 1993, CX) – as Kazuya Kashiwagi
- Jajau Manarashi (Jul–Sep 1993, CX) – as Hajime Kubota
- Yonimo Kimyōna Monogatari Fuyu no Tokubetsu-hen "Nigiyakana Shokutaku" (6 Jan 1994, CX) – Koji Morita
- Kimi toita Natsu (Jul–Sep 1994, CX) – as Minoru Sugiya
- Miseinen (Oct–Dec 2015, TBS) Starring – as Hiroto Togawa
- Under the Same Roof 2 (Apr–Jun 1997, CX) – as Kazuya Kashiwagi
- Aki no Drama Special East of Eden (3 Oct 1997, TBS) – Kenji Habuchi
- Seija no Kōshin (Jan–Mar 1998, TBS) Starring – as Eien Machida
- Boy-hunt (Jul–Sep 1998, CX) – as Kei Hoshino
- Haru no Wakusei (1999, TBS) – as Masaya Tatebayashi
- Lip Stick (Apr–Jun 1999, CX) – as Takao Kasai
- Peach na Kankei (Oct–Dec 1999, NTV) Starring – as Shoichi Kitahama
- Koi no Kamisama (Jan–Mar 2000, TBS) – as Shin Takayuki
- Gamou Teijiken (2000, NHK) Starring – as Takashi Ozaki
- Daisuke Hanamura (Jul–Sep 2000, KTV–CX) – as Yoichi Kayama
- Food Fight "Gekikara Curry Taiketsu!! Majutsu… Kokoro Tozashita Shōjo" (15 Jul 2000, NTV) – Episode 3 guest; as street master
- Heaven Cannot Wait (29 Dec 2000, TBS) – as Takashi Sunohara
- Daisuke Hanamura Special "Nurse o Sukue!!" (2 Jan 2001, KTV–CX) – as Yoichi Kayama
- Joshideka! (2007, TBS) – Keita Murakami
- Confucius (2010, CCTV China) – as Yan Hui
- Uta de Aimashou (GyaO Internet television)
- Kurokouchi (2013, TBS) – as detention official
- Yokohama Kenbun-den Star Jan (12 Oct – 28 December 2013, tvk) – as Kakeru / Black Knight (voice) (special appearance)
- Algernon ni Hanataba o (Apr–Jun 2015, TBS) – as Hisato Shiratori
- Otome no Mystery Jidaigeki (2016) – Tozo

=== Stage ===
- Kegawa no Mary (1994, Shibuya Parco Theatre)
- Wandering Eyesbosman to Rena (1995, Rikkōkai Hall)
- Kegawa no Mary (1996, Shibuya Parco Theatre)
- Ai no Sanka (1996, Tokyo Metropolitan Theatre)
- Oh! Edo Rocket (2001, Osaka Shochiku-za. Later stepped down due to his arrest for possession of drugs)
- Blue Blue Birthday (2007, Tokyo Metropolitan Theater)
- Shin Tsumi to Bachi (2009, Akasaka Red Theatre)
- Romeo -Gozen 0-ji no Hōmon-sha- (2009, 30 Sep – 7 Oct, Zenrōsai Hall Space Zero)
- Hamlet -Aoi Bara no kuchizuke- (20–26 Apr 2010, Harajuku Quest Hall)
- Iie, Vintage desu (1–5 Apr 2011, Sun Mall Studio/8–11 Apr 2011, Shimokitazawa Station Theatre)
- Watashi to Aitsu no Kimyōna Tabi (6–10 Jul 2011, Sun Mall Studio)
- Suna no Chronicle (19–25 Oct 2011, People Theater 53rd performance)
- Ningyohime (10–15 Jan 2012, Solarie–Ueno Storehouse)
- Carthage no Hitobito Imelda Foley ni Sasagu (14–20 Mar 2012, People Theater 54th performance)
- Ningyohime Saien (16–20 May 2012, CBGK Shibugeki!!)
- Shinjuku Natsu no Uzu (25–31 Jul 2012, Sun Mall Studio Shinjuku)
- Danganronpa 2 The Stage: Goodbye Despair (3–13 Dec 2015, Zepp Blue Theatre Roppongi) – as Kazuichi Souda

=== Films ===
- Hero Interview (1994) – as Hoshino
- Yuri (1996) – as Masayuki
- Ignacio (1996) – as Kazuo Maeda (Ignacio)
- Artful Dodgers (1998) – as Yuichiro Hayakawa
- The Aurora: Umi no Aurora (2000) – as Hiroshi Ibuki (voice appearance)
- Indian Summer (2005) – as Akio Tomura
- Strange Circus (2005) – as Yuji Tamiya
- Kikyū Club, Sonogo (2006)
- Captain Tokio (2007) – as Aloha
- Nijiiro Harmony: My Rainbow Man (2007) – as Ryo
- Hey Japanese! Do you believe Peace, Love and Understanding? 2008: 2008-Nen, Imadoki Japanese yo. Ai to Heiwa to Rikai o Shinjiru kai? (2008) – as Tokio
- Namidatsubo (2008) – as Yusuke
- Night King (2009) – as Takeshi Enomoto
- Yoroi: Samurai Zombie (2009) – as Aihara
- Samurai Dash (2013)
- The House of Rising Sun (2013) – as Kenji
- Sazanami Rhapsody (2017) – as Jo Matsuo

=== Radio ===
- Groovin' High Radio (InterFM) (2005, Fridays 26:00–27:00)
- Issei Ishida Isse no Sey! (NBS Hikaru Ijūin no Oh! Deka Night box programme)

=== Advertisements ===
- Meiji Seika "American Chips" (1994)
- Shiseido "uno" (1995)
- Thai Airways
- Kirin Beverage "Kirin Lemon Select"

== Discography ==
=== Singles ===
- Warning (25 Feb 1994)
- Love Popsy Love (10 Jul 1994)

Kansai Telecasting Corporation–Fuji TV Shingo & Shinsuke no Abunai Hanashi ending theme

- My Friend (10 Jul 1994)

Meiji Seika "American Chips" advertisement song

- Medicine Wheel (25 Jun 1995)

Nippon TV variety TV Oja Mambo August–September ending theme

- Moon Dance (23 Jun 1999)
- Matorika (23 May 2001)

Yomiuri Telecasting Corporation–Nippon TV drama Pure Soul: Kimi ga Boku o Wasurete mo ending theme

=== Albums ===
- Simple Thing (25 Mar 1994)
- Stone Circle (21 Jul 1995)
- Peter to Ōkami / Zō no Babar (10 Jun 1996)

The songs appeared as part of the narration for the performances of the Opéra National de Lyon conducted by Kent Nagano.

- Pur (28 Jul 1999)

=== Others ===
- give it to me (2005)

Theme song of his self-starring film, Indian Summer.

- BluePrint (11 Jun 2008, Maker–Label: Bambi Promotion) – The first album of the different colour unit "Venus&Mars" formed with Magumi of Lä-Ppisch and Cioccolata's Fukiko Watanabe.
