= The Brighton Miracle (film) =

- Film poster
- Directed by: Max Mannix
- Written by: Max Mannix
- Produced by: Tim Farmer
- Starring: Temuera Morrison; Lasarus Ratuere; Sumire; Yûki Kudô
- Release date: 31 October 2019
- Running time: 83 minutes
- Country: Australia
- Language: English

The Brighton Miracle is a 2019 Australian-made film written and directed by Max Mannix about the lead-up to the Japan national rugby union team's unexpected win over South Africa at the 2015 Rugby World Cup, told through a combination of drama and documentary. Temuera Morrison plays Japan coach Eddie Jones and Lasarus Ratuere plays team captain Michael Leitch.

== Plot ==
The Brighton Miracle tells of one of the greatest sporting upsets in history. when the Japanese rugby administrators hire Australian coach, Eddie Jones (Temuera Morrison), to lead the Japanese national rugby team to the 2015 Rugby World Cup.

Adversity ensues, when Jones suffers a stroke and the mixed race player, Michael Leitch (Lasarus Ratuere), who Jones has selected as captain, breaks his leg. The death of Jones's father also introduces personal challenges. Despite this, Jones employs relentless techniques in order to alter Japan's underdog status, and the team undergoes a gruelling five month pre-World Cup camp, pushing everybody to the brink of despair, including staff, assistant coaches and team manager, JR (Masa Yamaguchi).

In their first ever face-off, Japan goes on to beat the then two-time world champions South Africa in the Pool B stage, with a win of 34-32, due to an 80th minute try.

== Cast ==
- Temuera Morrison as Eddie Jones
- Lasarus Ratuere as Michael Leitch
- Sumire as Satomi Leitch
- Yûki Kudô as Nellie Jones
- Masa Yamaguchi as JR
- Yutaka Izumihara as Ayumi Goromaru
