= Junichi Ishida =

Japanese actor and television personality (born 1954)

- 石田 純一
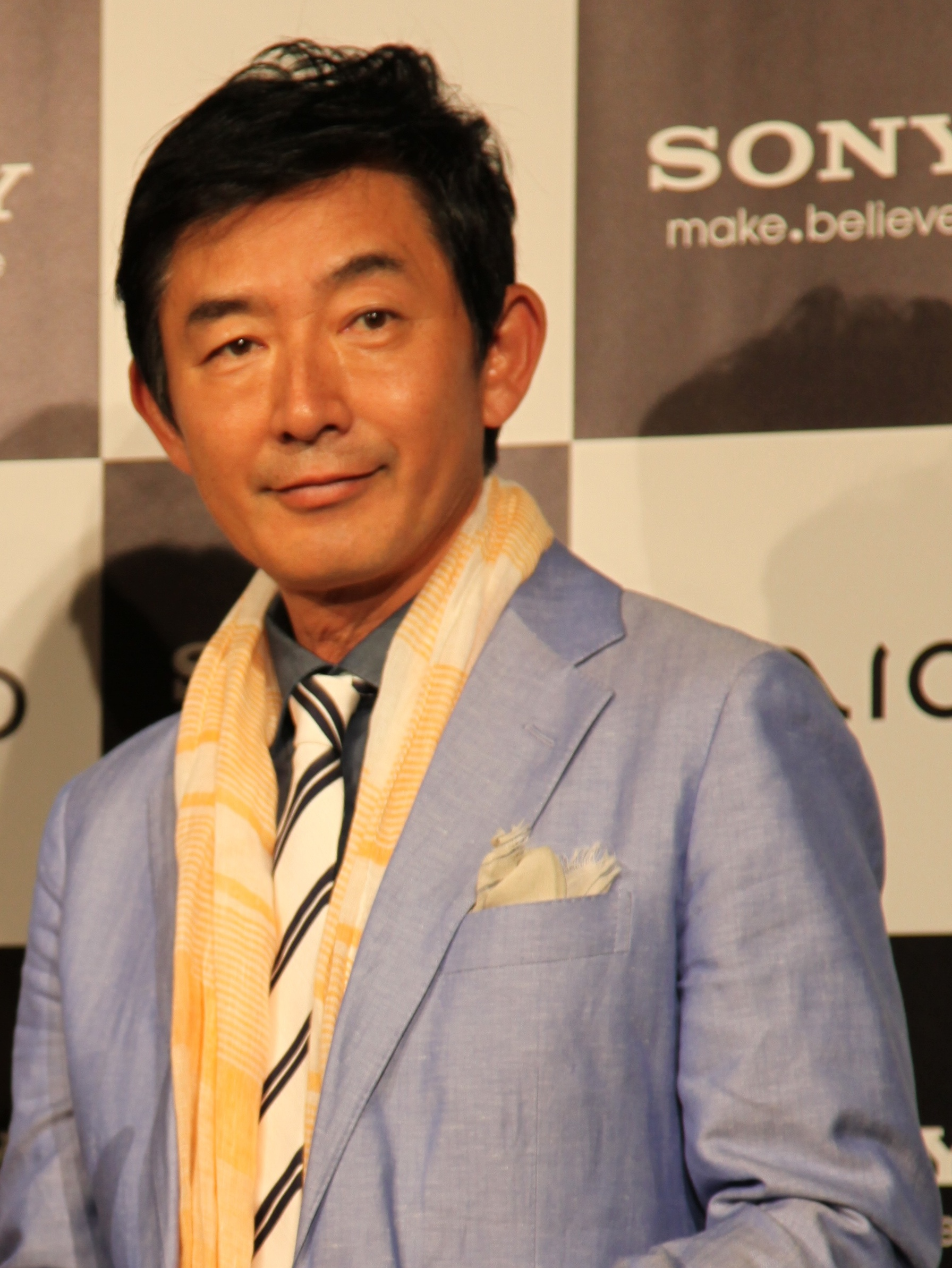
- Junichi Ishida in May 2010
- Born: Tarō Ishida (石田 太郎); 14 January 1954 (age 72); Tokyo, Japan
- Occupations: Actor, TV personality
- Years active: 1979–present
- Agent: Melon
- Height: 1.77 m (5 ft 9 1/2 in)
- Spouses: Chiaki Matsubara (1988–1999); Riko Higashio (2009–)
- Children: Issei, Sumire, Ritarō
- Website: www.ishidajunichi.com

Junichi Ishida (石田 純一, Ishida Jun'ichi; born 14 January 1954 as Tarō Ishida (石田 太郎)) is a Japanese actor and television personality from Tokyo. He is married to professional golfer Riko Higashio.

== Biography ==
Junichi Ishida was born in Tokyo. His father was a foreign correspondent for NHK, and he lived in the U.S. from the ages of three to six. He attended Waseda University, but dropped out before graduating.

Ishida has been married three times. He first married while he was a student, fathering a son, Issei Ishida, who became an actor and musician. His second marriage, to Chiaki Matsubara, lasted for 11 years before they divorced in 1999. They had one daughter, Sumire, who became an actress. He was subsequently in a relationship with TV personality Rie Hasegawa, but their 8-year relationship ended in 2004.

In October 2009, Ishida announced his engagement to professional golfer Riko Higashio. They registered their marriage on 12 December 2009. Their first son, Ritarō (理汰郎), was born on 5 November 2012.

Ishida is famous for not wearing socks in public. He claims that this started after he saw Italians not wearing socks while he was in Milan in 1985.

== Appearances ==
=== Film ===
- Tekkihei, Tonda (1980)
- Against (1981)
- The Gate of Youth (1981)
- The Go Masters (1982)
- Shosetsu Yoshida Gakko (1983)
- Tokyo: The Last Megalopolis (1988)
- Ai to Heisei no Iro Otoko (1989)
- The Aurora (2000)

=== Television ===
- Kage no Gundan4 (1984)
- Marco Polo, (1982–1983) TBS
- The Cowra Breakout (1984)

== Books ==
- Ishida, Junichi (2000). 落ちこぼれのススメ. Japan: Koshinsha. ISBN 978-4877610395.
- Ishida, Junichi (2006). The Day In My Life. Japan: Gentosha Inc. ISBN 978-4344010994.
