= Lasarus Ratuere =

Australian actor

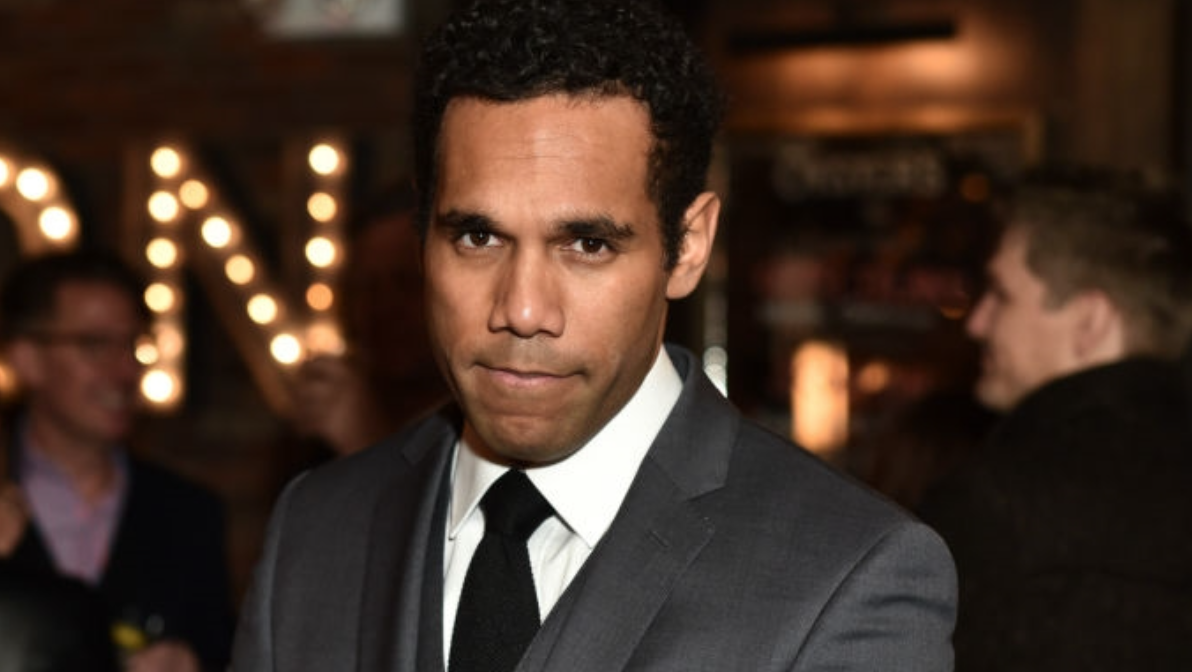
- Born: Adelaide, South Australia, Australia
- Education: St Joseph's College, Nudgee; Australian Performing Arts Conservatory (2012)
- Occupation: Actor
- Years active: 2012–present
- Known for: Ghost in the Shell

Lasarus Ratuere is an Australian actor, known for his portrayal of Ishikawa, in the feature film Ghost in the Shell.

== Early life ==
Ratuere was born in Adelaide, South Australia, Australia to Fijian parents, but grew up in Brisbane, Queensland. He graduated from the Australian Performing Arts Conservatory in 2012.

== Career ==
Ratuere graced Australian screens in 2011 world war epic The Digger, before making his American television debut in Steven Spielberg’s and 20th Century Fox’s sci-fi series Terra Nova in 2012. That same year, he portrayed Malcolm Mabo in the social and politically-motivated 2012 biopic drama Mabo, alongside Jimi Bani and Deborah Mailman.

In 2014, Ratuere played the role of Josh comedy feature film The Mule, alongside Leigh Whannell and Angus Sampson. The following year, he landed a lead role as Mick in award-winning indigenous teen drama series Ready for This.

Ratuere appeared in season 3 of HBO American supernatural drama series The Leftovers in 2017. That same year, he played the role of Ishikawa, a member of Section 9 alongside Scarlett Johansson in the DreamWorks and Paramount Pictures live-action feature film adaptation of the Ghost in the Shell franchise.

Ratuere appeared in two feature films in 2019. He played Corporal Buddy Lea in war drama Danger Close: The Battle of Long Tan alongside Travis Fimmel and Richard Roxburgh. He then played real life rugby captain Michael Leitch, alongside Temuera Morrison, in The Brighton Miracle, a docudrama portraying the lead-up to Japan's unexpected defeat of the Springboks at the 2015 Rugby World Cup.

Ratuere starred in 2021 award-winning black and white short film Nest, which premiered at the 69th Melbourne International Film Festival.. In 2022, Ratuere then appeared as CIA agent Felix Spears opposite Toni Collette in the Netflix thriller Pieces of Her. In 2023, he starred alongside Sheridan Smith as Felix Vatabua in Paramount+ suspense thriller series The Castaways, an adaptation of Lucy Clarke's best-selling novel. He has also been attached to star in a British SAS feature film with the working title Mirbat.

Ratuere's first Sydney theatre role was at Belvoir St Theatre in the Australian play called Kill the Messenger. This earned him a Helpmann Award nomination for his critically acclaimed performance as the troubled lad Paul Witt.

== Awards and nominations ==
Year	Work	Award	Category	Result	Ref.
2015	Kill the Messenger	Helpmann Award	Best Male Actor in a Supporting Role in a Play	Nominated	
2015	Kill the Messenger	Sydney Theatre Award	Best Newcomer	Nominated	

== Filmography ==
=== Film ===
Year	Title	Role	Notes	Ref.
2011	After the Fall	Gypsy	Short film	
2013	Manos Arriba	Bandit 2	Short film	
2014	The Mule	Josh		
2016	Sport	Scot Favro	Short film	
2017	Ghost in the Shell	Ishikawa		
2018	Tender	Fridge Man 2	Short film	
2019	Danger Close: The Battle of Long Tan	Corporal Buddy Lea		
2019	The Brighton Miracle	Michael Leitch		
2021	Nest		Short film	
TBA	Mirbat	Sekonaia Takavesi	Pre-production	

=== Television ===
Year	Title	Role	Notes	Ref.
2011	The Digger	Sir Reginald Saunders	TV movie	
2012	Terra Nova	Richardson (uncredited)	3 episodes	
2012	Mabo	Malcolm Mabo	TV movie	
2015	Ready For This	Mick	13 episodes	
2015	Black Comedy	Guest cast	1 episode	
2017	The Leftovers	Officer Bardo	Season 3, 1 episode	
2017	Cleverman	Bakanah	Season 2, 4 episodes	
2017	Pulse	Kenny Campbell	Episode 7	
2018	Grace Beside Me	Sonny McCardell	1 episode	
2019	Harrow	Myles Hendry	1 episode	
2021	The Tourist	Chris	2 episodes	
2021	Pieces of Her	Felix Spears	Miniseries, 1 episode	
2022	Irreverent	Ryan	Miniseries, 4 episodes	
2023	The Castaways	Felix Vatubua	5 episodes	
TBA	Beyond the Lines – Unspoken	Ratu	TV movie (post-production)	

== Theatre ==
Year	Title	Role	Notes	Ref.
2014	1790: A Tale Not Often Told	Bennelong	Darling Quarter Theatre, Sydney with Founding Modern Australia	
2015	Kill the Messenger	Paul Witt	Belvoir Theatre, Sydney	
