= Megumi Ōji =

Japanese actress

- 大路 恵美
- Born: September 27, 1975 (age 50); Kakogawa, Hyōgo, Japan
- Occupation: Actress
- Years active: 1989–present
- Notable credit: Under One Roof

Megumi Ōji (大路恵美, Ōji Megumi; born September 27, 1975) is a Japanese actress from Kakogawa in Hyōgo Prefecture. She is a graduate of Asia University.

Megumi entered acting in 1989. She made her debut the following year in a commercial for Seibu Department Stores. In 1991, JVC selected her for their annual National High School Baseball Championship poster campaign, following Noriko Sakai, Saki Takaoka, and Yumiko Takahashi (Miho Kanno, Kazumi Murata, Aya Ueto, Anne Watanabe, Anne Suzuki, Erika Toda and others have also appeared on these posters).

Her first dramatic role was in the 1991 TBS series Sensei no Okiniiri. She also appeared in Night Head Genesis (Fuji Television, 1992) and the 1993 series Under the Same Roof.

Megumi appeared as Otsuya in Fuji's 1996 Chūshingura. This presaged her roles in jidaigeki. NHK tapped her for the asadora drama Aguri (1997), and also in that year she reprised her role in Under the Same Roof. Returning to period dramas, she portrayed Sasaki Mifuyu, the female lead, for three years in Fuji's prime-time Kenkaku Shōbai opposite Makoto Fujita. She also played a newspaper reporter for four years in TV Asahi's Kyoto Meikyū Annai. Also on the Asahi network, she played the more mature role of Oshin, the lover of Shimizu Ichigaku, in the 2004 Chūshingura following another Chūshingura on TV Tokyo in 2003. She also appeared in numerous guest roles and in specials such as Onihei Hankachō. Megumi has made the rounds of the prime-time two-hour mystery shows on various networks.

Other activities include radio dramas, television commercials, and stage performances. In addition, she portrayed one of the Himeyuri Students in the 1995 version of the film Himeyuri no Tō. She has published a book of essays and appeared in magazine gravure features.
