= Hitotsu Yane no Shita =

- Written by: Shinji Nojima
- Directed by: Kozo Nagayama
- Starring: Yōsuke Eguchi; Masaharu Fukuyama; Noriko Sakai; Issei Ishida
- Country of origin: Japan
- Original language: Japanese
- No. of seasons: 2
- No. of episodes: 12+12

Production
- Running time: 50 minutes

Original release
- Network: FNS (Fuji TV)
- Release: April 12, 1993 – June 30, 1997

Hitotsu Yane no Shita (ひとつ屋根の下; lit.: "Under One Roof") is a Japanese television series. It had a first season in 1993 and a second season, titled Hitotsu Yane no Shita 2, in 1997. It was very popular in Japan, with its highest rating being 34 percent and it was also exported to other regions in East Asia. It features Yōsuke Eguchi, Noriko Sakai and Masaharu Fukuyama as its leading characters.

== Plot ==
Seven years ago, the Kashiwagi couple were killed in a car accident. They left behind six children, who were forced to live in different families. Tatsuya Kashiwagi, the eldest son, was a marathon runner. After retiring due to injuries, he opened a small laundry shop and was ready to marry his coach's daughter. However, his biggest wish is to find his five separated siblings and form a family together, but the six brothers and sisters grew apart over 7 years. While Tatsuya is very eager in uniting the family, his siblings, with the exception of the eldest daughter Koyuki, are apathetic towards his suggestion. They also have very different lives, one son is the heir to a big hospital - owned by his foster father, another is a juvenile delinquent, etc. The youngest brother was also disabled in an accident. In spite of these challenges, Tatsuya still decides to reunite the family so that they can live "under one roof". To accomplish this wish, he overcame various difficulties, and even sacrificed his own marriage prospects.

== Characters ==
- Yōsuke Eguchi portrays Tatsuya "Anchan" Kashiwagi, the eldest son. He used to be a professional marathon runner, but was forced to retire after tearing his Achilles tendon. He is the guardian of the family. Despite his short temper, he is a genuinely caring person, especially concerning his siblings.
- Masaharu Fukuyama portrays Masaya "Chii-nii-chan" Kashiwagi, the second son. After his parents' accident, he was adopted by a wealthy doctor, Kiuchi Yuuzo. He studied hard to meet the expectations of his foster family, and his foster father later decided to let him inherit his private hospital in the future. In contrast with Tatsuya, Masaya has a calm and mature disposition. Masaya often seen driving a 1992 BMW 5 Series E34.
- Noriko Sakai portrays Koyuki Kashiwagi, the elder adopted daughter of the Kashiwagi family. After the accident, she was adopted by relatives and later moved out to live alone after her foster parents divorced. She had an affair with the manager at her workplace. After Tatsuya's wedding was called off, she resigned and moved into the Kashiwagi family to take care of her siblings. She assists Tatsuya in his laundry shop.
- Issei Ishida portrays Kazuya Kashiwagi, the third son. He dropped out of high school, and was a delinquent, once having gone through a juvenile detention center. After returning to the Kashiwagi family, he turns a new leaf and works hard. His character is similar to that of Tatsuya's. Being headstrong, he often quarrels with Tatsuya. He is talkative, except around women.
- Megumi Ōji portrays Koume Kashiwagi, the fifth child and the younger daughter. After being adopted by her relatives, she was not on good terms with the relative's daughter and was often bullied. Nevertheless, she is a hard worker and eventually gets into college.
- Koji Yamamoto portrays Fumiya Kashiwagi, the youngest son. His legs were injured in an accident. Subsequently, he was sent to a nursing home by his foster family and was mistakenly thought to have autism. Tatsuya found him and took him back in. Back home he overcame his sense of inferiority and started showing his skill with drawing, and he aims to become a painter. He is a tender and resilient boy.
- Yuki Uchida portrays Rina Hiyoshi, a famous theater actress. She was hospitalized due to a heart attack, and became friends with Masaya. She ignores her doctors' advice to not overexert herself, and dies while still onstage.

== Episode titles and viewership ==
Season 1 -

No.	Japanese title	English translation	Date	Viewership
1	苦い再会	Lingering Bitterness	1993/04/12	19.5%
2	弟を舍てるのか！	Just Give Him Up!	1993/04/19	20.6%
3	兄チャンと妹の涙	Tears of Brother and Sister	1993/04/26	23.1%
4	チィ兄ちゃん帰る	Second Brother's Second Chance	1993/05/03	22.0%
5	车椅子の弟へ	The Brother In a Wheelchair	1993/05/10	29.3%
6	结婚宣言	The Wedding Announcement	1993/05/17	26.8%
7	裏切られた纯情	The Farmer and the Viper	1993/05/24	29.6%
8	长女の悲しい家出	The Elder Daughter Leaves Home	1993/05/31	26.5%
9	そこには爱がある	Love is in the Air	1993/06/07	33.5%
10	弟よ、梦を抱け!	Brother, Embrace Your Dream!	1993/06/14	33.2%
11	引き裂かれた绊	Torn Ties	1993/06/21	37.8%
12	上を向いて歩こう	Advance Bravely	1993/06/28	35.9%

Season 2 -

No.	Japanese title	English translation	Date	Viewership
1	さよならチィ兄ちゃん	Goodbye Again, Second Brother	1997/04/14	26.3%
2	下宿人は美少女?	Sheltering a Beauty?	1997/04/21	23.0%
3	心の贫しき者へ	For the Faint Of Heart	1997/04/28	27.0%
4	腐った时代の青春	Life in the Moldy Age	1997/05/05	26.3%
5	车椅子の悲しき恋	Wheelchairs And Heartbreaks	1997/05/12	24.4%
6	车椅子の弟へ	Wheelchair Brother	1997/05/19	22.6%
7	心にはダムがある	The Dam In My Heart	1997/05/26	23.8%
8	雅也よ、帰れ	Go Home, Masaya	1997/06/02	26.3%
9	爱する兄の帰国	The Treasured Second Brother's Return	1997/06/09	28.3%
10	小雪の命、雅也の爱、达也の叫び	Koyuki's Life, Masaya's Love, Tatsuya's Cry	1997/06/16	30.0%
11	地球より重き爱情-兄弟の绊	The Best Kind of Love is Brotherly Love	1997/06/23	28.1%
12	さよなら柏木兄弟-6月の花嫁	Farewell, Kashiwagi Family-A Wedding in June	1997/06/30	34.1%
