= My Hero Academia season 6 =

Sixth season of My Hero Academia

My Hero Academia
- Season 6
- Cover art for the first home media volume of the sixth season as released by Toho Animation in January 2023
- No. of episodes: 25

Release
- Original network: ytv, NTV
- Original release: October 1, 2022 – March 25, 2023

Season chronology
- ← Previous; Season 5 Next → Season 7

The sixth season of the My Hero Academia anime television series was produced by Bones and directed by Kenji Nagasaki (chief director) and Masahiro Mukai, following the story of Kōhei Horikoshi's original My Hero Academia manga series from the final chapter of the 26th volume through the end of the 33rd volume. It covers the "Paranormal Liberation War" (chapters 258–306) and "Dark Hero" arcs (chapters 307–328); the first episode partially covers the rest of last season's chapter, while the rest was the remaining chapters in the former arc. Like the previous four, the season ran in two consecutive cours and aired from October 1, 2022, to March 25, 2023, on ytv and NTV.

The season follows the climactic battle between the Heroes with the students of U.A. High School, including Izuku Midoriya, and the Villains of the Paranormal Liberation Front led by Tomura Shigaraki. With information gathered by Hawks, while undercover at the merged-villain group, the Heroes confront them which leads to an all-out war that could change the superhuman society. The second half of the season depicts the aftermath of the war; the Heroes continue to save civilians and capture Villains while dealing with their casualties resulting from the loss of the public's trust. When All For One escapes from Tartarus and the secrets of "One For All" begin to be revealed to the public, Izuku realizes his powers make him a special target for the at-large Villains and therefore his presence at school endangers his classmates. Izuku decides to leave the school in order to assist the Pro Heroes as they attempt to lure the Villains out of hiding.

Crunchyroll has licensed the season outside of Asia and is streaming it along with an English dub two weeks after the original airing on its streaming service of the same name. However, the English dub of episode 129 was delayed due to inclement weather delays in the Dallas area where the series is dubbed. Medialink licensed the season in Asia-Pacific. The season's English dub aired on Adult Swim's Toonami programming block from December 4, 2022, to April 23, 2023.

For the sixth season: the first opening theme song is "Hitamuki" (ひたむき; lit. 'Single-Minded') performed by Super Beaver, while the first ending theme song is "Sketch" performed by Kiro Akiyama. The second opening theme song is "Bokurano" (ぼくらの; lit. 'Our') performed by Eve, while the second ending theme song is "Kitakaze" (キタカゼ; lit. 'North Wind') performed by Six Lounge.

== Episodes ==
No. overall	No. in season	Title (Note: English translated titles are taken from Crunchyroll.)	Directed by	Storyboarded by	Original release date	English air date (Note: Adult Swim listed the season as premiering on December 3, 2022, at midnight (24:00) EST/PST, which is effectively December 4.)	Viewership rating
114	1	"A Quiet Beginning"; Transliteration: "Shizukana Hajimari" (Japanese: 静かな始まり)	Tomo Ōkubo	Tomo Ōkubo	October 1, 2022	December 4, 2022	3.9%
A month prior to the events of the incoming War, Hawks is approached by Twice asking for advice. Hawks has been continuing his undercover work learning everything he can about the Paranormal Liberation Front and their plans for world domination. He also managed to get Twice to provide him the location of Tomura Shigaraki's current experimentation, due to his trust in him. In the present, a group of Pro Heroes meet at the Police Force Headquarters where they plan to split into two teams, one which will storm the Liberation's headquarters at the Gunga Mountain Villa, and one that will raid the Jaku General Hospital to apprehend Doctor Kyudai Garaki, All For One's secondhand man and creator of the Nomu. While Team Edgeshot await in the distance of the Villa for their orders, Team Endeavor confronts Dr. Garaki. He tries to flee but is restrained by Eraser Head, who uses his Erasure Quirk on him, causing his body to rapidly de-age and grow more decrepit; Present Mic confronts him enraged over what he did to Shirakumo. Mirko busts her way through toward the morgue, warning Endeavor as she comes across a hoard of Nomu in her path. A drill Nomu suddenly emerges from the floor, stabbing itself directly into Garaki, revealing him to merely be one of Twice's doubles. As the real Garaki attempts to flee his laboratory, alongside Shigaraki, Mirko breaks through, completely crushing his mini Nomu Johnny, and destroying several canisters, causing Garaki to scream out in fear.
115	2	"Mirko, the No. 5 Hero"; Transliteration: "Nanbā Faibu no Miruko-san" (Japanese: No.5のミルコさん)	Shōji Ikeno	Shōji Ikeno	October 8, 2022	December 11, 2022	3.1%
Mirko reports to the Heroes of her discovering Garaki, getting ready to kick him to see if he is the real one. A group of Heroes led by Crust make their way to assist her, while Endeavor and Eraser Head deal with the rampaging Nomu on the surface. At this same moment, the students are assigned to begin the evacuation in Jaku City. Lamenting over the loss of most of his Nomu, Dr. Garaki attempts to activate a device, but just as Mirko is going to stop him she is distracted by a small Nomu, giving him enough time to activate it. This device releases the five remaining High-Ends. Garaki uses this opportunity to rush to Shigaraki's containment pod, in order to complete his experimentation as fast as possible. While one High-End faces Crust, preventing the other Heroes from reaching the lab, Mirko faces off against the other four herself. Her left arm ends up brutalized in the battle, but she manages to defeat one of the High-Ends, and remains confident in being able to take on the others. Meanwhile at the Gunga Mountain Villa, Skeptic yells to the other members about the Heroes incoming attack, as Team Edgeshot makes their way to start the battle. An anxious Kaminari is nervous being on the front line, but after receiving support from Midnight and Tokoyami, and thinking about Jiro in the rear guard, he regains his confidence. A member of the Paranormal Liberation Front unleashes his Amplivolt Quirk in attempt to take out most of the Heroes, but his electricity is absorbed into the confident Kaminari.
116	3	"One's Justice"	Tsuyoshi Tobita	Takashi Kawabata	October 15, 2022	December 18, 2022	4.0%
The Heroes continue their assault on the Gunga Mountain Villa, using their Quirks to take down the resisting villains. They also close all the exits to the assembly hall, with Tokoyami assisting Fat Gum, using Dark Shadow at full power to halt Re-Destro and his group from escaping. Dark Shadow warns Tokoyami after noticing Gigantomachia in the hall, but Fat Gum reassures him he will only move upon given orders by his master; he also reveals to Tokoyami that Hawks provided them with all this info. Meanwhile, Hawks uses his feathers to keep a distressed Twice at bay, preventing him from helping the Paranormal Liberation Front with his Double Quirk. Twice begins to break down, realizing that just like what happened with Overhaul, he has been tricked and everything has begun to fall apart because of him. Hawks tries to talk Twice into turning himself in and starting over, believing him to not be a bad person, but Twice refuses to listen, dedicating himself for the sake of the League's happiness. Hawks is easily able to deal with Twice's retaliation with his Quirk and is about to finish the job when Dabi suddenly appears, shooting his fire at the Hero, revealing he never truly trusted him. Dabi provides an opening for Twice to escape and assist the others, however Hawks manages to evade the fire, and despite being caught off guard by Dabi referring to him by his real name, "Keigo Takami", he is able to prevent Twice from fleeing, fatally stabbing him in the back. One last Twice Double is able to reach Toga and Mr. Compress, saving them from a Hero, and apologizing to them for his mistake as he begins to fade away. Toga embraces Twice, thanking him for saving her, as he thinks about despite what Hawks claimed, he did have a happy life, as he turns to mush.
117	4	"Inheritance"; Transliteration: "Keishō" (Japanese: 継承)	Kazuma Komatsu	Motonobu Hori	October 22, 2022	January 8, 2023	4.0%
Dabi overpowers Hawks using his Blueflames in retaliation for Twice's death. Hawks says he was unable to find any information about Dabi's past, as he tells him he never cared about the League's goals, and instead will use them to make "Stain's will" a reality. After he reveals his identity, stunning Hawks, Dabi prepares to burn him alive. Back at the hospital, Mirko finds herself struggling to deal with the High-Ends as they begin to stabilize, so she rushes toward Garaki to destroy Shigaraki's containment capsule. She is held back by one of the High-Ends, but through her tenacity, and the assistance of Endeavor and Eraser Head, she is able to destroy the pod when it is at 75% completion. Garaki attempts to awaken Shigaraki, but Present Mic is able to completely destroy the lab before he can, punching the Doctor for good measure. While he drags Garaki away to stop the Nomu, the Hero X-Less watches over the comatose Shigaraki. Garaki reveals that he developed the Quirk Singularity theory over 70 years ago, but was ridiculed with only All For One believing him; he also reveals the incident that created Kurogiri was meant for Eraser Head. Meanwhile, Shigaraki finds himself in a shattered mindscape, where he is approached by visions of his family members. A shadowy All For One beckons him, as it is also revealed that Shigaraki was bestowed upon him the original All For One Quirk. He is held back by his family members, including Nana Shimura, but he decays them away, telling them not to reject him, as he enters the darkness. In the real world, a jolt of electricity awakens Shigaraki.
118	5	"The Thrill of Destruction"; Transliteration: "Hametsu no Borutēji" (Japanese: 破滅のボルテージ)	Ikurō Satō	Michio Fukuda	October 29, 2022	January 15, 2023	4.4%
Tokoyami arrives just in time to save Hawks before Dabi can kill him. The villain attempts to corner the bird heroes, but Tokoyami is able to take advantage of Dabi's monologuing to evade the fire, and use the escalating fighting between the Heroes and Paranormal Liberation Front to escape with the unconscious Hawks. Meanwhile at the Hospital, Shigaraki kills X-Less, steals his cape, and unleashes his Decay. The resulting effect proceeds to consume the entire Hospital, forcing the Heroes to desperately flee; in the chaos Crust ends up sacrificing himself to save Eraser Head. In the city, Deku receives a warning from the first user of One For All of Shigaraki's awakening, as the Decay begins to spread into the city and toward the evacuation team. The heroes, including Deku and Shoto Todoroki, attempt to stop the wave but fail, forcing them to carry the civilians away to avoid their deaths. Burnin tries to call out Endeavor or other Heroes, but receives no response which sends her into a panic. In the remaining crater of the Hospital left behind, Shigaraki discovers the nearly all ruined Quirk-Destroying Bullets Garaki was recreating, which was destroyed by X-Less before his death. A voice starts to speak in his head, as he uses a communicator to summon Gigantomachia to him, declaring that it is time to destroy everything.
119	6	"Encounter, Part 2"; Transliteration: "Enkauntā Ni" (Japanese: エンカウンター2)	Tomo Ōkubo	Tomo Ōkubo	November 5, 2022	January 22, 2023	3.6%
At the Villa, Tokoyami takes Hawks to safety while the Pro Heroes and the Liberation Front continue their battle. Toga uses her Quirk to transform into another hero, going on a killing spree enraged over Twice's death, with Mr. Compress and Dabi watching on from the side, just as Gigantomachia's hand emerges from beneath. Meanwhile in Jaku City, the Police HQ scramble to keep up with the chaos caused by Shigaraki's Decay. Endeavor faces the villain head-on, who is able to easily rebuff the flame hero with his new Super Regeneration, as well as the extra Quirks from All For One. Despite this, a voice continues to call out to Shigaraki from within, telling him to get "One For All". Endeavor overhears this, which is promptly overheard by the others on the comms, including Deku. Realizing that Shigaraki is now after him, which he is able to thanks to the Search Quirk stolen from Ragdoll, Deku makes his way back into the city away from the evacuees, accompanied by Bakugo, who intends to use this opportunity to get revenge on Shigaraki for his previous kidnapping. Deku informs Endeavor that he is Shigaraki's target, causing the villain to use his Quirks to destroy their communication devices. Shigaraki suddenly appears before Deku and Bakugo, ready to steal One For All, but they are saved by Gran Torino. Endeavor and Ryukyu proceed to physically attack Shigaraki, which they now can do thanks to Eraser Head using his Erasure on him, however they are shocked to find that his new All Might-level physical strength is not a Quirk but his actual body physically enhanced, just like the Nomu. Gran Torino tells Deku and Bakugo to remain on the sidelines while the Heroes handle things, however everyone is stunned when suddenly a group of Nomu appear from underground.
120	7	"Disaster Walker"; Transliteration: "Dizasutā Wōkā" (Japanese: 災害歩行(ディザスターウォーカー))	Shōji Ikeno	Shōji Ikeno	November 12, 2022	January 29, 2023	3.4%
A news helicopter reports in on the devastating destruction of Jaku City, with All Might watching on nervously. In the city, Shigaraki is able to efficiently deal with Endeavor and Ryukyu's attacks, while the Heroes attempting to assist are forced to face against the newly awakened "Near High-End Nomu"; Nomu with the strength of a High-End but lacking coherent thoughts. Shigaraki tries to use this opportunity to kill Eraser Head, but Deku suddenly arrives and tackles him, declaring his and Bakugo's intentions to save their teacher. As Endeavor returns to the battle, he agrees to let the two students join in the fight. Shigaraki hopes to try and capture Deku and escape, but in the process, he ends up calling him his "little brother", surprising the two. He realizes that the will of his master still persists within the Quirk, rejecting it and declaring his desire to be better than All For One. The Heroes proceed to overwhelm Shigaraki with their coordinated attacks. Meanwhile at the Villa, Gigantomachia carries the League of Villains members on his back in an attempt to reach Shigaraki; right before he does Dabi nabs Skeptic to take with them, planning to use him for a specific purpose. Mt. Lady is able to barely hold Gigantomachia off, slowing him down while being pushed backward. Midnight attempts to use her Quirk to send the villain back to sleep but is thwarted by the attacks of Dabi and Mr. Compress, which knocks her to the ground, injuring her. She calls on Momo Yaoyorozu and tells her to create anesthetics in order to put the beast to sleep, just as their call is cut off. With the Heroes busy fighting the villains and only the U.A. students remaining, Momo takes charge, issuing orders to her classmates as they prepare to intercept Gigantomachia.
121	8	"League of Villains vs. U.A. Students"; Transliteration: "Viran Rengō bāsasu Yūei Sei" (Japanese: 敵(ヴィラン)連合vs雄英生)	Kazuma Komatsu	Kō Matsuo	November 19, 2022	February 5, 2023	3.4%
The Class 1-A and 1-B students led by Momo work together to set up their trap, successfully getting Gigantomachia stuck in the ground, with the plan of forcing his mouth open and injecting a sedative into him to knock him out. They attempt to get in close to the League still on his back, but are pushed back by the villains, and literally blown away by the beast as they try to throw the sedatives inside. Dabi's fire prevents most of them from getting any closer, but using her Quirk, Mina is able to rush through to reach the beast. However, she ends up recognizing Gigantomachia from their encounter during middle school, and hesitates just long enough to miss her shot. He nearly crushes her, but is saved by Kirishima, who manages to hold onto his leg and successfully throws Mina's sedative canister into his mouth. The Pro Heroes return to battle, however everyone is stunned as Gigantomachia starts to transform his body. Meanwhile in Jaku, Shigaraki declares his conviction how heroes save people while abandoning their families, and that he is the result of them all ignoring the true problems of their society. He refuses to let up the assault, and ends up critically injuring Gran Torino, who at this time remembers back to the incident when Nana abandoned her son to save him, wondering if what they did was right. Shigaraki attempts to go after Eraser Head, but is held back by Deku and Ryukyu using all of their strength. Unbeknownst to them however, Shigaraki is in possession of a Quirk-Destroying Bullet, and uses his fingers to shoot it toward Eraser Head, hitting him in the leg.
122	9	"Katsuki Bakugo: Rising"; Transliteration: "Bakugō Katsuki: Raijingu" (Japanese: 爆豪勝己：ライジング)	Tomohiro Kamitani	Tomohiro Kamitani	November 26, 2022	February 12, 2023	3.7%
To desperately halt the effects of the Quirk-Destroying Drug, Eraser Head cuts his leg off. Despite this, Shigaraki manages to reach his face, slicing one of his eyes, just as Shoto appears, who had been following Deku and Bakugo, blasting him with a mountain of ice, and further knocked back by Deku. With Eraser unconscious, his Quirk is undone, and Shigaraki begins to regenerate all of his injuries. Meanwhile, the evacuation team overhear of the mass destruction caused by Gigantomachia as he makes a reckless beeline directly toward his master; the rest of the U.A. students in Gunga can only look on in fear at the devastation left in his wake. Shigaraki prepares to finish everyone off, only for his body to suddenly split open, realizing that he was awakened too early. Deku figures out that, just like him, his body cannot withstand the power of All For One. At this moment, Deku unlocks the Quirk of the 7th user: Nana Shimura's Float, and combined with Blackwhip pulls Shigaraki into the air and rescues his companions. He proceeds to duel Shigaraki in the air alone while the Heroes recover on the ground, causing Bakugo to get anxious. He recalls a conversation with All Might during their training prior where Bakugo voiced his worries regarding a mystery of one of the One For All users, and admitting his bullying of Deku came from not understanding his unselfish and self-sacrifical attitude. While Deku unleashes the full power of One For All to overwhelm Shigaraki, even despite the damage on his body, Bakugo and Shoto get Endeavor into the air, so he can finish him off for good with a Prominence Burn. As he burns alive, All For One's voice calls out to Shigaraki, his body suddenly releasing an array of Rivet Stabs to knock Endeavor away. Shigaraki shoots several Rivets out toward Deku, but with no hesitation, just like Deku did for him before, Bakugo blasts forward, pushing him out of the way and getting stabbed instead.
123	10	"The Ones Within Us"; Transliteration: "Bokura no Naka no Hito" (Japanese: 僕らの中の人)	Tomo Ōkubo	Tomo Ōkubo	December 3, 2022	February 19, 2023	5.3%
Upon seeing Bakugo getting stabbed, Deku snaps and in an enraged haze attacks Shigaraki, who uses the opportunity to catch him off guard and touch his face, starting to steal One For All. Deku suddenly appears in the vestige world of One For All where he is faced against Shigaraki and All For One, who has begun to merge into the former's body despite his resistance; due to being unable to move in the world, Deku is supported by Nana Shimura. All For One introduces Shigaraki to his grandmother and reveals that a part of a person's consciousness resides within the Quirk Factors, explaining how the One For All predecessors still reside within the Quirk. Shigaraki begins to try and erode all of One For All, as well as All For One himself, but they are repelled away by All For One's younger brother. All For One attempts to discredit Deku for his failures, but his brother defends him for all the qualities he has in a hero. The two re-emerge in the real world, as All For One tells Shigaraki to flee so his body can adapt to the Quirk. Meanwhile, the evacuation team splits up to aid the team fighting Shigaraki and continue the evacuation in Gigantomachia's wake; Nejire and Ida go with the former and Ochaco and Tsuyu with the latter. The League on Gigantomachia's back observe the incoming heroes, and when she spots Ochaco and Tsuyu, Toga leaves to confront them, wanting to ask them a question still distraught over Twice's death. Disguised as an old woman, Toga lures Ochaco into an abandoned building where at knife point she asks what she plans to do with her; Ochaco responds she will do whatever she can to help the people in trouble. As she throws Toga off, Ochaco prepares to apprehend her.
124	11	"Dabi's Dance"; Transliteration: "Dabi Dansu" (Japanese: ダビダンス)	Shōji Ikeno	Shōji Ikeno	December 10, 2022	February 26, 2023	3.9%
A Hero rides on a plane making his way toward the battlefield. Shoto rescues Deku, Bakugo, and Endeavor from falling, who are all shocked to see Shigaraki still standing, refusing to listen to All For One's words to retreat. Nejire and Ida arrive to warn the others of Gigantomachia's incoming rampage, with the former assisting Shoto in fighting Shigaraki, while the latter helps escort the injured heroes away. Meanwhile, Ochaco and Toga continue to fight in the abandoned house. Toga reveals she was able to use Ochaco's Quirk and was able to kill someone using it, which horrifies her. She also realizes that Ochaco also likes Deku, leading to a scuffle over his Christmas gift to her. Ochaco tells Toga that if she keeps disrupting people's lives she will have to face the consequences, which she responds with tears in her eyes. Tsuyu appears to help Ochaco, but Toga is able to escape, with Ochaco wondering why she started crying; with her answer, Toga prepares to reunite with the League. Gigantomachia finally arrives to Shigaraki's location, and reclaims him just as he is knocked unconscious by Shoto and Nejire's attacks. Dabi then unveils himself on the beast's back, washing the dye out of his hair and revealing his real name: Toya Todoroki. At this same time, Skeptic hacks into all the televisions across the country broadcasting a confessional from Dabi, revealing his lineage as Endeavor's oldest son, and his abusive past all in the pursuit of power. Endeavor and Shoto are horrified by the revelation, as Dabi gleefully takes joy in the airing out all of the dirty laundry, including Hawks' murders of Twice and Best Jeanist, and his father being a criminal who Endeavor had locked away. Endeavor is left absolutely speechless, thinking about his past raising Toya to be his successor and his supposed death, and Dabi prepares to finish everyone off with his own Prominence Burn. But suddenly, he and the other villains are restrained by metal cables from the sky, as an alive Best Jeanist enters the battle.
125	12	"Threads of Hope"; Transliteration: "Ichiru no Kibō-tachi" (Japanese: 一縷の希望たち)	Ikurō Satō	Minoru Ōhara	December 17, 2022	March 5, 2023	3.7%
Best Jeanist uses his metal fibers to restrain Gigantomachia and the League, with Dabi surprised that he is alive. Spinner attempts to wake Shigaraki up to give Gigantomachia an order, and before Nejire can blast them, Dabi burns her with his fire, escaping from his restraints by covering his whole body in flames. Thinking about his past, Shigaraki manages to barely let out a "destroy", re-inciting Machia and forcing Jeanist to keep his hold on the giant. At this moment, several of the Near High-Ends the Heroes have been fighting break off from the group to attack Jeanist. Deku laments unable to do anything due to his broken body when suddenly Mirio returns, saving Jeanist by punching the Nomu away; the previous day he had asked Eri to use her Rewind Quirk on him so he could get his Quirk back and rejoin the battle, which she happily agrees to. He receives assistance from Ida, Nejire, and Bakugo, with the latter revealing to his old mentor his hero name: "Great Explosion Murder God Dynamight"; the name is met with disdain from everyone other than Mirio. Meanwhile, Shoto attempts to fight his brother but finds himself overwhelmed by his fire and his insanity, all the while their father stands motionless on the ground. Deku intervenes in their fight using Blackwhip from his mouth, telling Dabi that he is not Endeavor. After a sudden ping in his head, Gigantomachia breaks free from the fibers, but spurred on by Deku's words, Endeavor uses his last remaining strength to knock into Machia, who suddenly falls unconscious due to the anaesthetic the U.A. students inserted into him finally taking into effect. As the War reaches its climax, Mr. Compress declares that he and his teammates have not accomplished their goals, and are not done yet.
126	13	"Final Performance"; Transliteration: "Rasuto Sutēji (Note: Last Stage)" (Japanese: ラストステージ)	Tsuyoshi Tobita	Tomo Ōkubo	December 24, 2022	March 5, 2023	4.3%
Mr. Compress recalls back to before the League's encounter with the Meta Liberation Army, when they faced against the Creature Rejection Clan, and Spinner voiced his doubts on Shigaraki's plan for their future. In the present, Mr. Compress uses his Quirk on himself, mutilating his body but being freed from Best Jeanist's grasp, allowing him to compress Spinner and Shigaraki and escape up Gigantomachia's back. He also compresses Skeptic as well as Dabi, who retreated upon defeating Shoto, due to Endeavor being unconscious. Revealing himself to be the great-great-grandson of the Peerless Thief Oji Harima, Compress frees Spinner and Shigaraki, sacrificing himself to let them flee. At this same time, Deku's head continues to pound away, which he realizes is the Quirk of the fourth user of One For All: Danger Sense. Recalling Shigaraki's words about his stuffed hands giving him disgust and peace, Spinner puts his remaining one on his face, causing him to re-awaken, unleashing a Radio Waves blast that knocks the Heroes away. However, Spinner discovers that All For One has taken control of Shigaraki's body, due to it being on the verge of breaking, and had commanded the Near High-End Nomu to help them escape, leaving behind Compress, Toga, and Machia as punishment for Shigaraki's failure. The remaining Heroes try to attack Shigaraki but are all blasted away as the Nomu pick him up and escape. As Deku attempts one last chance to stop him, he too is blasted away, told they will meet again when his body is repaired. With destruction and chaos all over the battlefield, Deku thinks about even after all the terrible things Shigaraki did, when he saw him being overpowered and taken over by All For One, he looked like someone who needed help.
127	14	"Hellish Hell"; Transliteration: "Gokukoku, Jigoku" (Japanese: 極々、地獄)	Shōji Ikeno	Takashi Kawabata	January 7, 2023	March 12, 2023	4.1%
Prior to the start of the War, a Re-Destro Double created by Twice is invited to the Hero Public Safety Commission for a joint operation, which turns out to be an ambush for his arrest. The Double proceeds to rampage about before dissolving, killing several Heroes including the President of the Public Safety Commission. In the aftermath of the War, all the wounded Heroes are taken to hospitals to recover. Among the villains who are arrested are Dr. Garaki, who is promptly interrogated by the Police, Mr. Compress who is taken to the hospital for his injuries, Gigantomachia who is air-lifted away, Re-Destro and Geten who are defeated in battle, as well as 16,000+ members of the Paranormal Liberation Front and some Pro-Heroes who supported them. However, Shigaraki, most of his Nomu, Spinner, Dabi, Skeptic, and 132 other Liberation soldiers manage to escape as well as Toga also being missing in action. In the remains of the city left behind by Gigantomachia's destruction, Ochaco and Tsuyu help the remaining Heroes and Police help and save as many injured and trouble civilians as they can. However, the casualties prove too overwhelming to the point that some Heroes contemplate retiring, believing the work no longer worth it. At the same time, the U.A. students discover the corpse of Midnight, tearfully mourning their teacher and the other fallen Heroes. Meanwhile, many other civilians continue to react over Dabi's confession, wondering how Endeavor will respond. That night, All For One within Shigaraki commands the Nomu to storm Tartarus to free his main body.
128	15	"Tartarus"; Transliteration: "Tarutarosu" (Japanese: タルタロス)	Tomo Ōkubo	Tomo Ōkubo	January 14, 2023	March 12, 2023	3.2%
The All For One-possessed Shigaraki and his army of Near High-Ends raid Tartarus, the maximum security prison in which the "dregs of society" are thrown in to never be released. They successfully destroy the main gate, killing the guards, and make their way toward the main facility on an island. While flying on a Nomu, Shigaraki attempts to regain control of his body, but his master's will remains stronger, telling him to rest and that he is to become "the next me". Using their shared consciousness, both All For Ones execute dual EMP attacks, shutting down the power in the prison from the inside and out. This results in all the prisoners being let free and proceeding to go on a rampage, which includes Muscular, Moonfish, and Stain while a female prisoner releases Overhaul out of his cell. Shigaraki reunites with All For One, declaring to the prisoners to follow him if they want to escape as it is the start of how he became the greatest "Demon Lord". All For One proceeds to commandeer several aircraft, sending the Nomu and inmates to attack seven other prisons around the country, freeing the prisoners from six of them. Shigaraki returns to the League to rest his body, leading Spinner to argue that he intends to follow Shigaraki, not whoever's controlling him, despite his claims that he has the best interests in mind. Two days later, Bakugo awakens at Central Hospital where he learns from his classmates the state of everyone after the War. Gran Torino and Eraser Head are still alive, but in critical condition. Endeavor is taking part in surgery while the hospital is surrounded by protesters. Shoto recovers from his injuries, resolving that he is the one who has to stop his brother, just as his siblings and mother appear to greet him. While everyone else has regained consciousness, Izuku still remains in a comatose state, watched over by All Might.
129	16	"The Hellish Todoroki Family, Part 2"; Transliteration: "Jigoku no Todoroki-kun-chi Ni" (Japanese: 地獄の轟くん家2)	Kazuma Komatsu	Takashi Kawabata	January 21, 2023	March 19, 2023	3.3%
When he was a child, Keigo Takami lived in a poor and abusive household. His father was a villain who went on the run with his mother after killing someone, inadvertently having a child, who he would treat terribly. Keigo would watch news broadcasts of Heroes, but never believed in them beyond fantasy, clinging to his Endeavor doll as his only source of happiness. One day, his father is arrested by Endeavor, reinvigorating hope in the boy that Heroes are real. He and his mother are left on the streets, as she begs him to use his wings to do something. After Keigo saves some civilians from an incident, they are approached by the Hero Public Safety Commission, recruiting Keigo to be a hero while also cutting all ties of the "Takami" name for them both. In the present, Best Jeanist and Hawks drive through the city, where they explain how they were able to put Best Jeanist into a "death-like state" to fool Dabi before he was revived. Best Jeanist stops a group of thugs on the street where he learns the police are too busy rounding up the escaped convicts, and the hero offices nearby have shut down causing them to notice how much the faith in heroes has dwindled. They arrive at Hawks' mother's home where he finds a letter from her explaining how Dabi had sent men to force her into revealing his past, and that she has fled to not cause him anymore trouble. Hawks laments on his failure to save his mother and instead run from his past, and declares his intention to do what he wants to do now and help Endeavor. Meanwhile, civilians have started to take matters into their own hands using support items to fight villains, but their inexperience only leads to more damage and more decrying for the Heroes being late. Some of the Heroes end up retiring for different reasons. Endeavor regains consciousness in the hospital, breaking down over Dabi and his past sins coming back to haunt him. Shoto and his siblings awkwardly walk in on him as he tearfully attempts to apologize for his guilt and actions. He is then confronted by Rei regarding his current state, telling him they need to talk about Toya.
130	17	"The Wrong Way to Put Out a Fire"; Transliteration: "Hi no Fushimatsu" (Japanese: 火の不始末)	Shōji Ikeno	Shōji Ikeno	January 28, 2023	March 19, 2023	4.0%
The Todorokis reminisce on their past history that led them to this moment. Enji and Rei had discovered that while Toya possessed a fire Quirk greater than his father's, he had his mother's constitution, making him resistant to ice but weak to his own fire. In an attempt to protect him, Enji ceased all training with Toya, but when that refused to deter him, he decided to have more kids to make him lose his resolve. After Natsuo's birth, Shoto is born with the Quirk combination Enji desired, to his joy and Toya's devastation. After an incident where Toya had a breakdown and nearly attacked Shoto, Enji banned all interaction between Shoto and the other siblings. By the time he was 13, Toya continued to grow more emotionally distraught with his siblings and mother, while also training his Quirk to the point his fire grew from red to blue. He wanted to show his father his progress, but upon the realization he had continued his training, a furious Enji took his anger out on Rei. This reached her breaking point, resulting in the incident of Shoto's burning and her hospitalization, followed shortly after by Toya's supposed death as his Quirk went overload and burned the entire mountain down. In the present, Rei declares to Endeavor that he is not the one suffering the most, and they all carry a small weight in Toya's downfall, so they will help deal with him together. Hawks and Best Jeanist then arrive, telling Endeavor about the current state of the world and requesting a team-up to help solve their problems together. Hawks then asks him about "One For All", as Endeavor's mention of it during the battle with Shigaraki has spread to the public asking questions, leading him to tell them about Izuku. Meanwhile, All Might continues to watch over Izuku alone, knowing he is currently having a conversation with the predecessors of One For All.
131	18	"Izuku Midoriya and Tomura Shigaraki"; Transliteration: "Midoriya Izuku to Shigaraki Tomura" (Japanese: 緑谷出久と死柄木弔)	Ikurō Satō	Shōji Ikeno	February 4, 2023	March 26, 2023	3.6%
Izuku awakens in the vestige world of One For All, where he encounters all eight predecessors of One For All (with the second and third users facing away from him). The first user reveals that between One For All's increased growth in power and All For One's intervention, they are now freely able to communicate with each other and Izuku. The fourth user and the user of Danger Sense, Hikage Shinomori, introduces himself to Izuku, as they discuss with him about the true nature of One For All. He reveals that he died at the age of 40 due to "old age", after holding One For All for 18 years. Aware that All Might held the power for 40 years, they determine that One For All greatly diminishes the lifespan of those who already possess a Quirk, and because All Might was Quirkless, he was saved from this burden. Due to this revelation, they surmise that due to the increased power in the Quirk and the decreasing Quirkless population, Izuku may be the last wielder of One For All. Nana then confronts Izuku, asking if he is resolved to kill Shigaraki, stating that All For One intends to use his intense rage to overwhelm and finally steal One For All, which he has failed to do in the past. They are aware that Izuku felt like he needed saving, but warn him that he could be beyond saving and turn into an unstoppable monster. Izuku stands firm that he saw a little boy crying within Shigaraki during their encounter, and that All Might showed him One For All is a power meant to save not kill, so while he is resolved to do so if he has to, he wants to try and save him first. The users accept his hand as Nana breaks down in tears, apologizing for testing him. Back outside, Hawks and Best Jeanist confront All Might about One For All and realizing he cannot keep the secret anymore, reveals everything to them. Several days later, Endeavor, Hawks, and Best Jeanist put on a press conference to address the public of Dabi's accusations and their plan to turn U.A. into an evacuation facility to protect the civilians. At the same time, Izuku gives letters to all of his classmates, revealing the truth about One For All and All For One, and leaves the school.
132	19	"Full Power!!"; Transliteration: "Zenryoku!!" (Japanese: 全力!!)	Shōji Ikeno	Tomohiro Kamitani	February 11, 2023	March 26, 2023	3.8%
Ketsubutsu Academy third-years Yo and Tatami enter a nearly abandoned city in order to evacuate the remaining civilians, having received reports of a jailbreaker causing destruction nearby. Yo attempts to convince them, but they refuse as they no longer trusting in Heroes and believing they can fend off danger and protect themselves. Shortly after they encounter the aforementioned jailbreaker Muscular, who Yo attempts to fight off while Tatami goes to protect the civilians. Yo is pinned down, but even after using his Quirk at full power, Muscular has the upper hand and nearly kills him, until a hooded Deku, covered in purple smoke, appears to save him. Muscular recognizes him from their fight in the forest and excitingly prepares to fight him. Deku hands the unconscious Yo to Tatami and re-enters the fight. The sixth user En warns him to not overuse his Quirk Smokescreen as Deku uses his new arsenal of abilities and experience to get the upper hand on Muscular. He attempts to reason with him, asking him why he causes trouble and even referring to him by his real name, but Muscular declares all he cares for is wanton destruction. Taking advantage of his muscle fibres being damaged by Yo, Deku punches him with a Detroit Smash, knocking him unconscious. While Deku brings Muscular to prison, the civilians agree to evacuate with the Ketsubutsu students, not wanting anyone else to get hurt. Deku temporarily reunites with All Might before heading off to deal with the next threat. Several days prior at the hospital, Izuku awoke to learn the injuries on his body were not as fatal as they initially believed due to his increased in strength in his body. He and All Might then tell Inko the truth behind One For All, with Izuku saying he will not be returning to U.A. in order to protect everyone with Shigaraki targeting him. He comforts his tearful mother telling her he will return to her, with All Might saying he will stay by his side. They decide to team up with Endeavor, Hawks, and Best Jeanist, using Izuku as bait to lure the villains out of hiding. Before leaving the hospital, Izuku visits Gran Torino who tells him killing can be a way to save, and hands him his cape to wear.
133	20	"Hired Gun"; Transliteration: "Shikaku" (Japanese: 刺客)	Tsuyoshi Tobita	Shinji Satō	February 18, 2023	April 2, 2023	3.5%
Deku saves a tall mutant woman being attacked by panicking civilians who believe she is a villain, having All Might escort her to safety. While surveying the city with the One For All users, he thinks back to during the conversation with the vestiges when the first user Yoichi requests the Second and Third users' help in assisting Deku. They reveal they were from the era when All For One was at the peak of his power and part of a resistance fighting against him, unable to agree with Deku's idealistic beliefs. However, Yoichi reminds them how they had saved him from All For One's capture, rather than killing him like they were originally going to, and that was what allowed One For All to grow in the first place. They eventually are convinced to follow alongside him. Later after taking care of some thieves, Endeavor is lambasted by protesting civilians over his failures and for continuing to keep secrets. Endeavor, Hawks, and Best Jeanist proceed to discuss All For One's plans, believing he intends to completely hijack Shigaraki's body before pursuing Deku, and surmising he requires Shigaraki's hatred to steal One For All because he lacks any. Just then, Deku's GPS goes out while All Might's car is attacked by a smoke bomb. It turns out his phone was sniped by former Public Safety Commission Pro Hero Lady Nagant, one of the Tartarus escapees sent by All For One to capture Deku. She uses her Quirk Rifle to shoot at him from afar, causing him to swing around the city and attempt to evade and defend. Lady Nagant is accompanied by Overhaul, who she had rescued from Tartarus, telling him to hide. A flashback shows that Nagant reluctantly agreed to All For One's request learning about Deku's overt idealism about hero society and accepted payment in the form of a second Quirk called Air Walk.
134	21	"The Lovely Lady Nagant"; Transliteration: "Uruwashiki Redi・Nagan" (Japanese: 麗しきレディ・ナガン)	Tomo Ōkubo	Tomo Ōkubo	February 25, 2023	April 2, 2023	3.8%
All Might is cornered by two thugs, they are scared away by his sheer tenacity refusing to leave Deku behind. Deku swings through the city to reach Lady Nagant's location only to be caught off guard by more bullets coming from behind him, realizing she was given an extra Quirk by All For One to lure him closer to her. With no other option, Deku unleashes Smokescreen on the ground and begins to build up energy in his legs, which the third user recognizes as him using his Quirk Fa Jin. He warns him about using it since he has no experience, but he is successfully able to feint out Nagant in the smoke and use the energy boost to blast through a building and grab her. He demands to know why she follows All For One despite originally being a Pro Hero, and as she continues to shoot away at him, she explains her history. She was an assassin sent out by the Commission to kill corrupt heroes taking advantage of the system, as well as villains before they committed any crimes. All of the blood on her hands began to eat away at her mentally, considering everything about their society to be a sham. When she confronted her superior about this, he threatened her with silence, so she killed him in retaliation. This incident was covered up by saying she killed a fellow hero in a dispute. In response, Deku admits that everything is not as black-and-white as he initially believed, but that is why he still intends to land a hand. To catch him off guard, Nagant suddenly aims her rifle at the nearby Overhaul. He had provided her information on who Deku was in order for her to take him to his Boss. She shoots at Overhaul, but with no hesitation, Deku uses the power of Fa Jin to become faster than a speeding bullet, knocking him out of the way, and uses his remaining strength to defeat Nagant. He saves her from falling, asking her to join their fight, believing she still has the heart of a hero within her. But before she can respond, her body suddenly explodes from within due to a failsafe All For One left inside her. Hawks arrives just in time to rescue her. With her last remaining strength, Nagant tells the Heroes of All For One's location. Endeavor apprehends Overhaul. After hearing him rant about apologizing to his Boss, Deku says he will follow Nagant's promise if he shows that same regret to Eri as well. As he sees Nagant's charred body, rage towards All For One begins to swell up within Deku.
135	22	"Friend"; Transliteration: "Tomodachi" (Japanese: 友だち)	Shōji Ikeno	Shōji Ikeno	March 4, 2023	April 9, 2023	3.1%
Deku and the Top Three Heroes, plus The Lurkers, confront All For One at his hideout in Haibori Woods only to find it abandoned. A recording left by All For One taunts Deku for his failures, telling him it is "his turn", before setting the mansion to self-destruct. The Heroes escape and reconvene to discuss their options, due to the dwindling amount of Heroes left available. Meanwhile, Deku swiftly deals with the second hitman while All Might desperately attempts to convince him to rest. Deku believes that since he can practically use One For All at 100% without backlash, he does not have to watch over him anymore and All Might can only look on devastatingly as Deku flies away, leaving him behind. Over the next several days, Deku proceeds to tirelessly travel through the city, saving whoever he can, ignoring the Heroes and the One For All predecessors' advice to take it easy. Because of this, Deku starts taking on a more monstrous appearance with civilians scared of him and rumours going around that he is a Nomu, yet he refuses to stop, all so that he and everyone he cares about can smile again. Severely fatigued, he begins to collapse in Kamino where he confronts another hitman named Dictator who uses his Quirk to attack Deku using nearby civilians. Due to being too tired, Deku is unable to fight and is swarmed by the mob until he is saved by Bakugo who knocks Dictator out. After having received Deku's letters, Class 1-A figured out that Deku and All Might were working with Endeavor, and use Nezu to summon him to the school to confirm this. They state their desire to help their classmate in his moment of need and Nezu approves of them going out onto the streets to bring him back. Class 1-A confronts Deku, who refuses to give in and demands they get out of his way, preparing to fight.
136	23	"Deku vs. Class A"; Transliteration: "Deku bāsasu Ē-gumi" (Japanese: デクvsA組)	Tomo Ōkubo	Shinji Satō	March 11, 2023	April 9, 2023	2.7%
Deku attempts to escape from his classmates so they all try to restrain him. During their struggles, each Class 1-A student reminds Deku of something he had done for or said to them in the past, and how much their friendship means to them. Deku refuses to listen as he does not want them to be caught up in his battle against All For One and get hurt, as his way of "protecting" them. After almost every one of their attempts to talk or pin him down fail, Deku prepares to execute Faux 100 Percent to blast himself away for good, but Class 1-A combine all of their abilities to create a massive ramp which they use to blast Ida into the sky at blistering speeds, catching up to Deku and grabbing his hand. Ida repeats what Deku had said to him in the past when he saved him, that helping without being asked is the essence of a hero, causing Deku to start to give into his exhaustion. On the ground, he once again tries to keep his distance from everyone, but Bakugo confronts him, admitting the reason behind why he bullied him in the past. He sincerely apologizes for everything he said and done, telling him the class does not want to reject who he is, but support him to help save everyone. Deku finally gives in and apologizes himself before passing out. He wakes up in front of the now heavily-fortified U.A. only to be met by a mob of angry civilians demanding Deku not enter, aware that he is the boy Shigaraki is after. Deku is about to leave, but is stopped by Ochaco, who tells him "It's gonna be fine".
137	24	"A Young Woman's Declaration"; Transliteration: "Miseinen no Shuchō" (Japanese: 未成年の主張)	Ikurō Satō	Kō Matsuo	March 18, 2023	April 16, 2023	3.3%
Prior to rescuing Izuku, Nezu explained to Class 1-A the intricacies designed into the U.A. Barrier to keep it fortified from villains and to protect the civilians inside. In the present, the civilians protest Izuku's entry, believing his presence will put everyone in the school in danger. Best Jeanist tries to explain everything to get them to understand, but his words only make the crowd even more anxious over the Heroes' failures, stressing Izuku out. Ochaco then grabs the megaphone and floats on top of U.A., giving a speech pleading to the civilians to let Izuku rest because Heroes deserved to be saved too. As a result, the civilians start to see how battered and tired Izuku is and by the end of her speech, Izuku breaks down on his knees in tears. He is comforted by Kota and the mutant woman he saved earlier. One of the civilians speaks out to the rest of the crowd, admitting how much like bystanders they have been in their treatment towards the Heroes and that they should be doing their part to help in some way. After Izuku declares he will bring the world back to the way it was, the civilians accept him as he is escorted inside. Meanwhile, Nezu speaks to a recovering Aizawa in the Central Hospital, revealing that they had transferred Kurogiri to the location after the discovery of him being Shirakumo's Nomu, attempting to re-awaken him. Outside U.A., All Might leaves to find more civilians, thinking about his influence with Izuku's current state, all the while Stain continues to follow him.
138	25	"No Man Is an Island"; Transliteration: "Tsunagaru Tsunagaru" (Japanese: つながるつながる)	Shōji Ikeno	Shinji Satō	March 25, 2023	April 23, 2023	3.0%
All Might arrives at the site of his final battle in Kamino, lamenting his failure as a teacher and a hero, when he is confronted by Stain. Even after briefly revealing to him his muscle form to confirm his identity, Stain refuses to believe he is the "real All Might", and to take back his criticisms towards the hero. All Might explains his feelings on unable to make a difference due to the state of the world, only for Stain to show him a young girl who has been going out everyday to clean the All Might statue from its vandalism; the last person All Might saved during said battle. Stain tells him it was not power that made All Might great but his ability to inspire others and their wills to keep his flame burning, these words which start to move All Might. Stain promptly leaves, handing All Might a data disk he had retrieved from Tartarus, telling him to kill him when the time is right. At U.A., the boys give Izuku a swift soak in the bath, where Bakugo re-declares even after his apology, he still sees everyone as his rivals. After their clean-up, All Might arrives to apologize to Izuku, telling everyone they received information indicating the final battle is soon, heading back out to prepare. Izuku finally falls asleep and the rest of his classmates declare they will do everything to bring the world back. All Might meets up with Naomasa Tsukauchi and the Police Force where they decode the information from Tartarus. They discover that All For One's consciousness within Shigaraki was able to communicate with his real self through Radio Waves, with the conversation revealing that Shigaraki's body will be complete in just three days. All Might requests immediate aid from the foreign heroes, with the world governments unsure how to respond due to their own issues. Despite this, America's Number 1 Hero Star and Stripe is already en route to Japan on her own with an army of fighter jets, intending to assist her "master". Shortly afterwards, Izuku wakes up from a nightmare, greeted by his classmates, whose presence helps relieve him of his stress as they intend to save the day together.

== Home media release ==
=== Japanese ===
Toho Animation released the sixth season of the anime on Blu-ray and DVD in four volumes in Japan, with the first volume released on January 18, 2023, and the final volume released on July 19, 2023.

Toho Animation (Japan – Region 2/A)
Volume	Episodes	Release date	Ref.
1	114–120	January 18, 2023	
2	121–126	March 15, 2023	
3	127–132	May 17, 2023	
4	133–138	July 19, 2023	

=== English ===
Crunchyroll released the first part of the sixth season on home media on December 19, 2023, while the second part was released on August 27, 2024. The complete parts of two volumes received a Blu-ray release on October 21, 2025.

Crunchyroll, LLC (North America – Region 1/A)
Part		Episodes	Release date	Ref.
Season 6	1	114–126	December 19, 2023	
Season 6	2	127–138	August 27, 2024	
Season 6	Complete	114–138	October 21, 2025	

Madman Entertainment (Australia and New Zealand – Region 4/B)
Part		Episodes	Release date	Ref.
Season 6	1	114–126	February 7, 2024	
Season 6	2	127–138	October 16, 2024	
