= Auto Boy - Carl from Mobile Land =

2020 anime television series

- Anime key visual

のりものまん モービルランドのカークン (Norimonoman Mobiru rando no Ka-kun)
- Manga
- Published by: Shogakukan
- Magazine: Mebae
- Original run: April 1, 2020 – present
- Anime television series
- Directed by: Shinobu Sasaki
- Produced by: Taito Itō
- Written by: Yoshimi Narita
- Music by: Cher Watanabe
- Studio: CloverWorks
- Licensed by: NA: Aniplex of America
- Original network: NHK-E
- Original run: April 2, 2020 – March 24, 2022
- Episodes: 104

Auto Boy - Carl from Mobile Land (Japanese: のりものまん モービルランドのカークン, Hepburn: Norimonoman Mobiru rando no Ka-kun; lit. Norimono Man Mobile Land no Car-kun) is a multimedia kids project by Aniplex and Sony Music Entertainment Japan. A manga adaptation began serialization on Shogakukan's Mebae magazine on April 1, 2020. An original anime television series produced by CloverWorks began airing from April 2020.

== Plot ==
Carl is a red sports car working as a delivery worker in the Mobile Land island. During his deliveries, he obeys traffic rules and meets all kinds of friends.

== Characters ==
Carl (カークン, Car-kun)
Voiced by: Ayahi Takagaki
Amy (キューちゃん, Kyū-chan)
Voiced by: Yuka Maruyama
Polly (パッポン, Pappon)
Voiced by: Junji Majima
Pudding (プリンちゃん, Purin-chan)
Voiced by: Sakura Tange
Felix (ポンプ, Pump)
Voiced by: Nobuyuki Hiyama
Dustin (ダストン, Daston)
Voiced by: Wasabi Mizuta
Pops (おやっさん, Oyassan)
Voiced by: Tesshō Genda
Ruster (サビビー, Sabibi)
Voiced by: Show Hayami
DJ Nav (DJナビ, DJ Navi)
Voiced by: Setsuji Satō

== Media ==
=== Manga ===
A manga adaptation began on Shogakukan's Mebae magazine from April 1, 2020.

=== Anime ===
Aniplex and Sony Music Entertainment Japan announced the TV series on March 3, 2020. It is directed by Shinobu Sasaki and produced by Taito Itō, with Toshiya Ono writing the scripts. Himu Ashitazu drafts the original character designs, with Hiromi Ogata adapting those character designs for animation. Cher Watanabe is composing the series' music, while Kisuke Koizumi is the sound director. The series is animated by CloverWorks and premiered on the NHK's education channel from April 2, 2020.

No.	Title	Directed by	Written by	Original release date
1	"Delivery and Carl"; Transliteration: "Otodoke ya Kā-kun" (Japanese: おとどけやカークン)	Shinobu Sasaki	Yoshimi Narita	April 2, 2020
2	"That Rusty Guy"; Transliteration: "Sabisabi no Aitsu" (Japanese: サビサビのあいつ)	Shinobu Sasaki	Yoshimi Narita	April 9, 2020
3	"Cool Ambulance"; Transliteration: "Kūru na Kyūkyūsha" (Japanese: クールな救急車)	Masashi Ishihama	Yoshimi Narita	April 16, 2020
4	"Catch the Thief!"; Transliteration: "Dorobō o Tsukamaero!" (Japanese: どろぼうをつかまえろ！)	Masashi Ishihama	Yoshimi Narita	April 23, 2020
5	"Tender Pudding"; Transliteration: "Puripuri Purin-chan" (Japanese: ぷりぷりプリンちゃん)	Shin'ichirō Ueda	Yoshimi Narita	April 30, 2020
6	"Fire Truck Felix, Action!"; Transliteration: "Shōbōsha Ponpu, Shutsudō!" (Japanese: 消防車ポンプ、出動！)	Ryō Kodama	Yoshimi Narita	May 7, 2020
7	"I'm Out of Gas!"; Transliteration: "Gasu Ketsu de Pussun!" (Japanese: ガス欠でぷっすん！)	Shinobu Sasaki	Misuzu Chiba	May 14, 2020
8	"The Wandering Bike"; Transliteration: "Sasurai no Baiku" (Japanese: さすらいのバイク)	Ryō Kodama	Ken'ichi Yamashita	May 21, 2020
9	"Construction Vehicles"; Transliteration: "Kōji Suru Norimono" (Japanese: 工事するのりもの)	Lim Kahee	Sayaka Abe	May 28, 2020
10	"Collect Trash"; Transliteration: "Gomi o Atsumete" (Japanese: ゴミをあつめて)	Ryō Kodama	Isao Murayama	June 4, 2020
11	"Carl's Rival!"; Transliteration: "Kā-kun no Raibaru!" (Japanese: カークンのライバル！)	Shin'ichirō Ueda	Misuzu Chiba	June 11, 2020
12	"What Will you do When you Grow Up?"; Transliteration: "Ōkiku Nattara Nani ni Naru?" (Japanese: 大きくなったら何になる？)	Nahoko Iiyama	Yoshimi Narita	June 18, 2020
13	"Pops is Amazing!"; Transliteration: "Oyassan wa Sugoi!" (Japanese: おやっさんはすごい！)	Lim Kahee	Ken'ichi Yamashita	June 25, 2020
14	"Good Morning Carl"; Transliteration: "Ohayō Kā-kun" (Japanese: おはようカークン)	Kakushi Ifuku	Ken'ichi Yamashita	July 2, 2020
15	"Be Careful With the Fever"; Transliteration: "Netsu ni Gochūi" (Japanese: ねつにごちゅうい)	Masashi Ishihama	Sayaka Abe	July 9, 2020
16	"Buu Buu Wash!"; Transliteration: "Bū Bū Wosshu!" (Japanese: ブーブーウォッシュ！)	Shinobu Sasaki	Misuzu Chiba	July 16, 2020
17	"Fire Truck, Great Assemble!"; Transliteration: "Shōbōsha, Dai Shūgō!" (Japanese: 消防車、だいしゅうごう！)	Shin'ichirō Ueda	Yoshimi Narita	July 23, 2020
18	"Big Delivery"; Transliteration: "Ōkina Otodoke ya" (Japanese: おおきなおとどけや)	Ryō Kodama	Isao Murayama	July 30, 2020
19	"The Shinkansen Has Arrived!"; Transliteration: "Shinkansen ga Kita!" (Japanese: 新幹線が来た！)	Akihisa Shibata	Ken'ichi Yamashita	August 6, 2020
20	"The Police Motorcycle is Fast!"; Transliteration: "Shirobai wa Subayai!" (Japanese: 白バイはすばやい！)	Kento Nakagomi	Yūsuke Kanbayashi	August 13, 2020
21	"I Want to be a Firefighter"; Transliteration: "Shōbōshi ni Naritai" (Japanese: 消防士になりたい)	Yōhei Shindō	Isao Murayama	August 20, 2020
22	"New Menu Great Strategy"; Transliteration: "Shin Menyū Dai Sakusen" (Japanese: 新メニュー大作戦)	Kento Nakagomi	Misuzu Chiba	August 27, 2020
23	"Friend to Ruster?!"; Transliteration: "Sabibī ni Tomodachi!?" (Japanese: サビビーにともだち！？)	Akihisa Shibata	Ken'ichi Yamashita	September 3, 2020
24	"Before Crossing, Right, Left, Right"; Transliteration: "Wataru Mae ni, Migi, Hidari, Migi" (Japanese: 渡る前に、右、左、右)	Akihisa Shibata	Sayaka Abe	September 10, 2020
25	"Grandpa Has Arrived!"; Transliteration: "Jitchan ga Yatte Kita!" (Japanese: じっちゃんがやってきた！)	Yōhei Shindō	Yoshimi Narita	September 17, 2020
26	"Large Athletic Meeting of Vehicles"; Transliteration: "Norimono Dai Undōkai" (Japanese: のりもの大運動会)	Yoshihiro Sugai	Misuzu Chiba	September 24, 2020
27	"Fun Service Area"; Transliteration: "Tanoshii Sābisu Eria" (Japanese: 楽しいサービスエリア)	Masashi Ishihama	Isao Murayama	October 1, 2020
28	"It's a Treasure Hunt Buon Buon!"; Transliteration: "Takara Sagashida Buon Buon!" (Japanese: 宝探しだブオンブオン！)	Kakushi Ifuku	Isao Murayama	October 8, 2020
29	"Port Vehicles"; Transliteration: "Minato no Norimono" (Japanese: 港ののりもの)	Yoshio Usuda	Yoshimi Narita	October 15, 2020
30	"Let's be Stylish!"; Transliteration: "Oshare Shite Miyō!" (Japanese: おしゃれしてみよう！)	Kento Nakagomi	Misuzu Chiba	October 22, 2020
31	"First Snow"; Transliteration: "Hajimete no Yuki" (Japanese: 初めての雪)	Tōru Hamasaki	Isao Murayama	October 29, 2020
32	"Holiday Vehicle"; Transliteration: "Norimono no Kyūjitsu" (Japanese: のりものの休日)	Shin'ichirō Ushijima	Misuzu Chiba	November 5, 2020
33	"Big Crisis at Mori Mori Energy"; Transliteration: "Mori Mori Enajī Dai Pinchi" (Japanese: モリモリエナジー大ピンチ)	Kento Nakagomi	Dai Masuyama	November 12, 2020
34	"Sea Trip by Car Ferry"; Transliteration: "Kā Ferī de Umi no Tabi" (Japanese: カーフェリーで海の旅)	Kento Nakagomi	Ken'ichi Yamashita	November 19, 2020
35	"Muddy Carl"; Transliteration: "Doronko Kā-kun" (Japanese: 泥んこカークン)	Akihisa Shibata	Sayaka Abe	November 26, 2020
36	"Flying Vehicle"; Transliteration: "Soratobu Norimono" (Japanese: 空飛ぶのりもの)	Ryō Kodama	Yoshimi Narita	December 3, 2020
37	"Amy, Is Something Wrong?"; Transliteration: "Kyū-chan, Nanka Hen?" (Japanese: キューちゃん、何か変？)	Lim Kahee	Isao Murayama	December 10, 2020
38	"The Fastest Mach"; Transliteration: "Saisoku no Mahha" (Japanese: 最速のマッハ)	Shin'ichirō Ushijima	Yoshimi Narita	December 17, 2020
39	"Burumi's Worries"; Transliteration: "Burumi no Nayami" (Japanese: ブルミの悩み)	Lim Kahee	Yoshimi Narita	December 24, 2020
40	"Deliver to Ruster"; Transliteration: "Sabibī ni Otodoke" (Japanese: サビビーにおとどけ)	Miyū Aoki	Yūsuke Kanbayashi	December 25, 2020 (Note: This episode aired as a christmas special on this day at 7:20 p.m. JST, 2 hours after the original air time.)
41	"Hurry Up, Gururun!"; Transliteration: "Isoge, Gururun!" (Japanese: 急げ、グルルン！)	Tōru Hamasaki	Sayaka Abe	January 7, 2021
42	"Aim for the World Race"; Transliteration: "Mezase Wārudo Rēsu" (Japanese: めざせワールドレース)	Yoshihiro Sugai	Isao Murayama	January 14, 2021
43	"Get on the Shinkansen!"; Transliteration: "Shinkansen ni Noruzo!" (Japanese: 新幹線にのるぞ！)	Tōru Hamasaki	Ken'ichi Yamashita	January 21, 2021
44	"Exciting Drive City"; Transliteration: "Wakuwaku Doraibu Shiti" (Japanese: わくわくドライブシティ)	Akihisa Shibata	Yoshimi Narita	January 28, 2021
45	"Irritated by Traffic"; Transliteration: "Jūtai de Iraira" (Japanese: 渋滞でイライラ)	Lim Kahee	Misuzu Chiba	February 4, 2021
46	"Business Trip Pudding Cafe"; Transliteration: "Shutchō Purin Kafe" (Japanese: 出張プリンカフェ)	Kento Nakagomi	Ken'ichi Yamashita	February 11, 2021
47	"Bike Fun Party"; Transliteration: "Baiku no Otanoshimi-kai" (Japanese: バイクのお楽しみ会)	Tōru Hamasaki	Misuzu Chiba	February 18, 2021
48	"Detective Polly"; Transliteration: "Meitantei Pappon" (Japanese: 名探偵パッポン)	Kakushi Ifuku	Ken'ichi Yamashita	February 25, 2021
49	"Carl, Makeover!"; Transliteration: "Kā-kun, Henshin!" (Japanese: カークン、変身！)	Yōhei Shindō	Isao Murayama	March 4, 2021
50	"World Race Start!"; Transliteration: "Wārudo Rēsu Sutāto!" (Japanese: ワールドレース スタート！)	Shinobu Sasaki	Yoshimi Narita	March 11, 2021
51	"Who Will Win the World Race?"; Transliteration: "Wārudo Rēsu ni Katsu no wa?" (Japanese: ワールドレースに勝つのは？)	Shinobu Sasaki	Yoshimi Narita	March 18, 2021
52	"Where is Carl?"; Transliteration: "Kā-kun wa Doko?" (Japanese: カークンはどこ？)	Shinobu Sasaki	Yoshimi Narita	March 25, 2021
53	"Vehicles That See the Stars"; Transliteration: "Hoshi o Miru Norimono" (Japanese: 星を見るのりもの)	Shinobu Sasaki	Isao Murayama	April 1, 2021
54	"Let's Renew Your License!"; Transliteration: "Menkyo o Kōshin Shiyō!" (Japanese: 免許を更新しよう！)	Minoru Yamaoka	Ken'ichi Yamashita	April 8, 2021
55	"That Child of Kogekoge"; Transliteration: "Kogekoge no Ano Ko" (Japanese: コゲコゲのあの子)	Shinobu Sasaki	Yoshimi Narita	April 15, 2021
56	"In Search of Memories"; Transliteration: "Omoide o Sagashite" (Japanese: 思い出をさがして)	Minoru Yamaoka	Yūsuke Kanbayashi	April 22, 2021
57	"Speaking of Pizza, It's Awesome!"; Transliteration: "Piza to Ieba Waiya!" (Japanese: ピザといえばワイや！)	Nahoko Iiyama	Misuzu Chiba	April 29, 2021
58	"Kind Picarin"; Transliteration: "Yasashii Pikarin" (Japanese: 優しいピカリン)	Ryō Kodama	Misuzu Chiba	May 6, 2021
59	"DJ Polly!"; Transliteration: "Dī Jei Pappon!" (Japanese: DJパッポン！)	Hiroyuki Kobashi	Isao Murayama	May 13, 2021
60	"Exciting! Yearning Felix"; Transliteration: "Dokidoki! Akogare no Ponpu" (Japanese: ドキドキ！憧れのポンプ)	Ryō Kodama	Misuzu Chiba	May 20, 2021
61	"Demolition! Yellow Workers"; Transliteration: "Kaitai! Ierō Wākāzu" (Japanese: 解体！イエローワーカーズ)	Akihisa Shibata	Ken'ichi Yamashita	May 27, 2021
62	"Super Model Lady!"; Transliteration: "Sūpā Moderu Redi!" (Japanese: スーパーモデル レディ！)	Yasuo Ejima	Ken'ichi Yamashita	June 3, 2021
63	"Washing Master Dustin!"; Transliteration: "Arai Masutā Dasuton!" (Japanese: 洗いマスター ダストン！)	Yasuo Ejima	Sayaka Abe	June 10, 2021
64	"Birth of a Kitchen Idol"; Transliteration: "Kitchin Aidoru Tanjō" (Japanese: キッチンアイドル誕生)	Masahiko Matsunaga	Isao Murakami	June 17, 2021
65	"Carl and the Little Bird"; Transliteration: "Kā-kun to Kotori" (Japanese: カークンと小鳥)	Nahoko Iiyama	Yoshimi Narita	June 24, 2021
66	"Airport Vehicles"; Transliteration: "Kūkō no Norimono" (Japanese: 空港ののりもの)	Minoru Yamaoka	Yoshimi Narita	July 1, 2021
67	"I'll Be on an Airplane!"; Transliteration: "Hikōki ni Noru zo!" (Japanese: 飛行機にのるぞ！)	Akihisa Shibata	Misuzu Chiba	July 8, 2021
68	"Great Thief Dorobon!"; Transliteration: "Ōdorobō Dorobon!" (Japanese: 大泥棒ドロボン！)	Shinobu Sasaki	Yoshimi Narita	July 15, 2021
69	"What is an Election?"; Transliteration: "Senkyotte Nan da?" (Japanese: 選挙って何だ？)	Masahiko Matsunaga	Isao Murayama	July 22, 2021
70	"Carl's Undersea Exploration"; Transliteration: "Kā-kun no Kaitei Tansaku" (Japanese: カークンの海底探索)	Ryō Kodama	Ken'ichi Yamashita	July 29, 2021
71	"The Trend is so Cute!"; Transliteration: "Torendo wa Boro Kawaii!" (Japanese: トレンドはボロかわいい！)	Masahiko Matsunaga	Dai Masuyama	August 5, 2021
72	"Mysterious Vehicle"; Transliteration: "Nazo no Norimono" (Japanese: 謎ののりもの)	Fumihiro Ueno	Isao Murayama	August 12, 2021
73	"I'll Grow Tomatoes!"; Transliteration: "Tomato o Sodateru zo!" (Japanese: トマトを育てるぞ！)	Yasuo Ejima	Misuzu Chiba	August 19, 2021
74	"I Love Camping"; Transliteration: "Kyanpu Daisuki Kyabii" (Japanese: キャンプ大好きキャビイ)	Ayumu Ono	Ami Satō	September 2, 2021 (Note: This episode was originally scheduled to air on August 26, 2021 but has been postponed by a week due to the extra coverage of the quarterfinals of the 103rd National High School Baseball Championship on NHK-E.)
75	"Grandpa, Again"; Transliteration: "Jitchan, Futatabi" (Japanese: じっちゃん、再び)	Yōhei Shindō	Ken'ichi Yamashita	September 9, 2021
76	"Mister Sun Sun Sun Island"; Transliteration: "Ohi-sama San San Airando" (Japanese: おひさまサンサンアイランド)	Nahoko Iiyama	Misuzu Chiba	September 16, 2021
77	"Tire Soccer!"; Transliteration: "Taiya Sakkā!" (Japanese: タイヤサッカー！)	Yōhei Shindō	Ken'ichi Yamashita	September 23, 2021
78	"It's a Mini Bee!"; Transliteration: "Mini Bī da bī!" (Japanese: ミニビーだビー！)	Masahiko Matsunaga	Yoshimi Narita	September 30, 2021
79	"Flame Up! Delicious Carrots"; Transliteration: "Kattobi! Oishii Ninjin" (Japanese: かっとび！おいしいにんじん)	Ryō Kodama	Momoka Toyoda	October 1, 2021 (Note: This episode aired on this day at 7:20 p.m. JST, 2 hours after the original air time.)
80	"Legendary Vehicle"; Transliteration: "Densetsu no Norimono" (Japanese: 伝説ののりもの)	Kaoru Suzuki	Isao Murayama	October 7, 2021
81	"Work Experience I'll Do My Best"; Transliteration: "Oshigoto Taiken Ganbaru zo" (Japanese: お仕事体験がんばるぞ)	Satoshi Nakagawa	Misuzu Chiba	October 14, 2021
82	"Mach's Detour"; Transliteration: "Mahha no Yorimichi" (Japanese: マッハの寄り道)	Kento Nakagomi	Ōnishi Takahito	October 21, 2021
83	"Welcome Home"; Transliteration: "Uchi e Yōkoso" (Japanese: うちへようこそ)	Hiroyuki Kobashi	Misuzu Chiba	October 28, 2021
84	"Trip, Ruster, Journey!"; Transliteration: "Tabi, Sabi, Jānī!" (Japanese: 旅、サビ、ジャーニー！)	Fumihiro Ueno	Isao Murayama	November 4, 2021
85	"All Over! Yellow Workers"; Transliteration: "Barabara! Ierō Wākāzu" (Japanese: バラバラ！イエローワーカーズ)	Ryō Kodama	Misuzu Chiba	November 11, 2021
86	"Safe, Secure, Yellow Shinkansen"; Transliteration: "Anshin, Anzen, Kiiroi Shinkansen" (Japanese: 安心、安全、黄色い新幹線)	Akihisa Shibata	Ken'ichi Yamashita	November 18, 2021
87	"Monster of Sun Sun Ruins"; Transliteration: "San San Iseki no Kaibutsu" (Japanese: サンサン遺跡の怪物)	Nahoko Iiyama	Misuzu Chiba	November 25, 2021
88	"Let's Make a Constellation"; Transliteration: "Seiza o Tsukurō" (Japanese: 星座を作ろう)	Fumihiro Ueno	Isao Murayama	December 2, 2021
89	"Wash Your Hands With Amy"; Transliteration: "Kyū-chan to Te o Araō" (Japanese: キューちゃんと手を洗おう)	Shin'ichirō Ueda	Momoka Toyoda	December 9, 2021
90	"Mom is Busy!"; Transliteration: "Mama wa Isogashii!" (Japanese: ママは忙しい！)	Hiroyuki Kobashi	Ken'ichi Yamashita	December 16, 2021
91	"Mini Bee is Getting Bigger"; Transliteration: "Mini Bī Okkiku Natta zo" (Japanese: ミニビーおっきくなったぞ)	Shinobu Sasaki	Yoshimi Narita	December 23, 2021
92	"Bookle who is Good at Talking"; Transliteration: "Ohanashi Jōzu no Bukkuru" (Japanese: お話上手のブックル)	Yasuo Ejima	Isao Murayama	December 30, 2021
93	"It's a Special Training! It's Salaman!"; Transliteration: "Tokkun da! Saraman da!" (Japanese: 特訓だ！サラマンだ！)	Shin'ichirō Ueda	Sayaka Abe	January 6, 2022
94	"Vehicle Trial"; Transliteration: "Norimono Saiban" (Japanese: のりもの裁判)	Akihisa Shibata	Isao Murayama	January 13, 2022
95	"Tunnel Digging Header"; Transliteration: "Tonneru Hori no Hedda" (Japanese: トンネル掘りのヘッダ)	Satoshi Nakagawa	Yūsuke Kanbayashi	January 20, 2022
96	"Let's Get on the Conventional Line!"; Transliteration: "Zairai-sen ni Norō!" (Japanese: 在来線に乗ろう！)	Akihisa Shibata	Ken'ichi Yamashita	January 27, 2022
97	"Ruster Samba's Bonds"; Transliteration: "Kizuna no Sabi Sanba" (Japanese: きずなのサビサンバ)	Shinobu Sasaki	Misuzu Chiba	February 3, 2022
98	"Dustin's Day Patrol Car"; Transliteration: "Dasuton no Ichinichi Patokā" (Japanese: ダストンの一日パトカー)	Akihisa Shibata	Ken'ichi Yamashita	February 10, 2022
99	"Feel Up on the Map!"; Transliteration: "Mappu de Kibun Appu!" (Japanese: マップで気分アップ！)	Yōhei Shindō	Yūsuke Kanbayashi	February 17, 2022
100	"Good Koge, Bad Koge"; Transliteration: "Yoi Koge, Warui Koge" (Japanese: よいコゲ、わるいコゲ)	Satoshi Nakagawa	Isao Murayama	February 24, 2022
101	"The True Identity of Mini Bee!"; Transliteration: "Mini Bī no Shōtai Bī!" (Japanese: ミニビーの正体ビー！)	Shinobu Sasaki	Yoshimi Narita	March 3, 2022
102	"King Ruster's Great Rampage!"; Transliteration: "Kingu Sabibī Dai Abare!" (Japanese: キングサビビー大あばれ！)	Shinobu Sasaki	Yoshimi Narita	March 10, 2022
103	"Save the World Ruster Samba!"; Transliteration: "Sekai o Sukue Sabi Sanba!" (Japanese: 世界を救えサビサンバ！)	Shinobu Sasaki	Yoshimi Narita	March 17, 2022
104	"Everyone's Mobile Land"; Transliteration: "Minna no Mōbiru Rando" (Japanese: みんなのモービルランド)	Shinobu Sasaki	Yoshimi Narita	March 24, 2022

=== Home media ===
A DVD entitled Car-kun no Nakama-tachi (カークンのなかまたち, lit. Car-kun's Group of Friends), containing 10 select episodes, will be released by Aniplex in Japan on November 25, 2020.

DVD releases
Region	Title	Episode count	Release date
2	Car-kun no Nakama-tachi (カークンのなかまたち)	10	November 25, 2020
