= Michael Leitch =

Japan international rugby union player

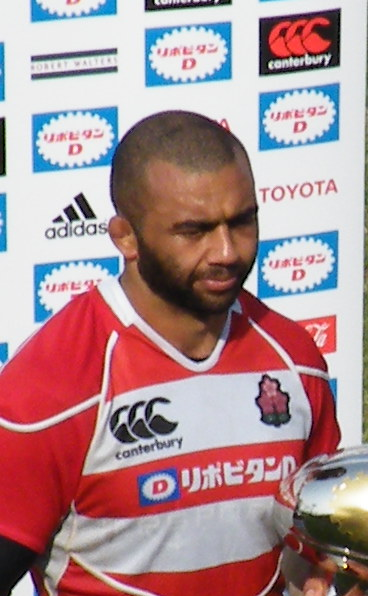
- Leitch representing Japan during the June Internationals
- Full name: Michael Geoffrey Leitch
- Born: 7 October 1988 (age 38) Christchurch, New Zealand
- Height: 1.89 m (6 ft 2 in)
- Weight: 105 kg (231 lb; 16 st 7 lb)
- School: Sapporo Yamanote High School
- University: Tokai University

Rugby union career
- Position(s): Number 8, Flanker, Lock
- Current team: Toshiba Brave Lupus
Senior career
Years	Team	Apps	(Points)
2011–	Toshiba Brave Lupus	190	(195)
2013	Sunwolves	8	(5)
2015–2017	Chiefs	34	(35)
- Correct as of 28 August 2023
International career
Years	Team	Apps	(Points)
2008	Japan U20	5	(5)
2008–	Japan	97	(100)
2023	Japan XV	2	(0)
- Correct as of 28 August 2023
National sevens team
Years	Team		Comps
2009	Japan		5
- Correct as of 28 August 2023

Michael Geoffrey Leitch (リーチ マイケル, Rīchi Maikeru; born 7 October 1988) is a New Zealand-born Japanese professional rugby union player who plays as a number eight for Japan Rugby League One club Toshiba Brave Lupus. Born in New Zealand, he represents Japan at international level after qualifying on residency grounds.

== Early life ==
Leitch was born in Burwood, Christchurch, New Zealand, to a New Zealand father and a Fijian mother. He was raised in Christchurch where he attended St Bede's College. In 2004, at the age of 15, he went to Sapporo Yamanote High School in Sapporo, Japan, as part of St Bede's school exchange program.

After finishing school he attended Tokai University and in 2008 captained the Japan U20 team at the Junior World Championship. He became a Japanese national in 2013 and officially inverted his name in Japanese from Michael Leitch to Leitch Michael.

== Club career ==
After the 2011 Rugby World Cup, he joined the Toshiba Brave Lupus in the Top League. In his first season he was named in the league's team of the season and given the award of "revelation of the season" at the end of the season awards. He followed this up by being named in the team of the season for a second season in 2012/2013.

He moved back to New Zealand after being named in the Hamilton-based Chiefs wider training squad for 2013, but was denied the chance to play after breaking an arm. He got a second chance with the Chiefs, signing a contract with the side for the 2015 Super Rugby season.

== International career ==
He made his test match debut for Japan in 2008 against the USA in Nagoya aged 20, receiving a yellow card in that game for a dangerous tackle. He quickly established himself as a regular member of the national side. His first try came against Kazakhstan in April 2009.

He impressed in the 2011 Rugby World Cup and was praised as one of Japan's best forwards, winning 'man of the match' in the loss to Tonga, where he scored a try and made a try-saving tackle on Siale Piutau.

In his first match back from injury, playing for Japan against Fiji in June, he broke a leg. He was appointed Japan captain by coach Eddie Jones in April 2014, becoming the second New Zealand-born player to lead the Brave Blossoms after Andrew McCormick in the 1990s. Leitch has spoken highly of Jones, saying in a 2019 interview that "Eddie helped me realise I am not Japanese... he is the one that reminded me I am from New Zealand and New Zealanders are not nice people... we're rough... That's probably the biggest piece of advice he has given me to take me from a good player to a better player." Jones returned the compliment, praising him as a "good player and a great man"

He captained the Japan national team at the 2015 Rugby World Cup, famously defeating South Africa in one of the biggest upsets ever. This victory is the core of the film The Brighton Miracle, in which he is played by Lasarus Ratuere; but also appears as himself.

For the 2018 season, Leitch moved to the Sunwolves, the Japanese Super Rugby team. In November of that year, he scored against England at Twickenham Stadium. His side led 15–10 at half-time, but eventually lost 35–15.

At the 2019 World Cup, when Japan were hosts, he led the victory over Ireland, ranked second in the world at that time, and then defeated Scotland to qualify for the knockout stages for the first time ever. Looking back on the tournament in 2023, the website RugbyPass labelled him as one of the players of the tournament, describing his leadership of the host nation's team as 'heroic'.

There is a statue of Leitch in one of the communal parks in Tokyo. During the 2019 World Cup it was a popular place for fans to have their photos taken.

Ahead of the 2023 Rugby World Cup, he was described as in 'vintage form' for the Brave Lupus by RugbyPass. However, on 22 July a high tackle on So'otala Fa'aso'o against Samoa in Sapporo saw him receive a red card from referee Mathieu Raynal. He was subsequently banned for three matches by World Rugby.
