= 2017 in Japanese television =

Events in 2017 in Japanese television. At the time to the commemoration of the 100th anniversary of anime, it was known as the Year of the Anime Centennial Anniversary.

== Events ==
Date	Event
June 30	ArtLand ceases operations after suffering financial difficulties. Seven Mortal Sins was being broadcast in Japan at the time of the studio's closure, and concluded on July 29; consequently, Seven Mortal Sins was the last anime to be produced by ArtLand.
October 1	TV Asahi moves the Super Hero Time block from 7:30-8:30 JST to 9:00-10:00 JST to make room for a Sunday morning news program entitled Sunday LIVE!!. The ordering of the shows in the block is also changed, with the Kamen Rider series airing before the Super Sentai series.
October 8	The 2017 Formula One World Championship will be held at 2017 Japanese Grand Prix.
October 15	The 2017 MotoGP World Championship will be held at 2017 Japanese motorcycle Grand Prix.

== Ongoing ==
Show	Type	Channel	First aired	Source
Aikatsu Stars!	Anime	TV Tokyo	April 7, 2016	
AKB48 Show!	Variety Show, Music	BS Premium, NHK World Premium	October 5, 2013	
AKBingo!	Variety Show	Nippon Television	October 1, 2008	
Cardfight!! Vanguard G: NEXT	Anime	TV Tokyo	October 2, 2016	
Chibi Maruko-chan	Anime	Fuji Television	January 8, 1995	
Count Down TV	Music	Tokyo Broadcasting System	April 7, 1993	
Crayon Shin-chan	Anime	TV Asahi	April 13, 1992	
Detective Conan	Anime	NNS	January 8, 1996	
Doraemon	Anime	TV Asahi	April 15, 2005	
Downtown no Gaki no Tsukai ya Arahende!!	Game-Show	Nippon Television	October 3, 1989	
Dragon Ball Super	Anime	Fuji Television	July 5, 2015	
FNS Music Festival	Music	Fuji Television	July 2, 1974	
Music Fair	Music	Fuji Television	August 31, 1964	
Music Station	Music	TV Asahi	October 24, 1986	
NHK Amateur Song Contest	Talent Show	NHK-G, NHK World Premium	March 15, 1953 (TV)	
Nintama Rantarō	Anime	NHK	April 10, 1993	
Ojarumaru	Anime	NHK	October 5, 1998	
One Piece	Anime	Fuji Television	October 20, 1999	
Panel Quiz Attack 25	Game-Show	TV Asahi	April 6, 1975	
Pokémon Sun & Moon	Anime	TV Tokyo	November 17, 2016	
Sasuke	Sports	Tokyo Broadcasting System	September 26, 1997	
Sazae-san	Anime	Fuji Television	October 5, 1969	
Soreike! Anpanman	Anime	Nippon Television	October 3, 1988	
Super Hero Time	Tokusatsu	TV Asahi	September 28, 2003	
Utacon	Music	NHK-G, NHK World Premium	April 12, 2016	
With Mother	Kids	E-TV, NHK World Premium	October 5, 1959	
Yo-kai Watch	Anime	TV Tokyo	January 8, 2014	

== New Shows & Returning Series ==
Show	Network	Premiere	Finale	Status	Source
Schoolgirl Strikers: Animation Channel	Tokyo MX	January 7	April 1	Series Ended	
Blue Exorcist: Kyoto Saga	Tokyo Broadcasting System Television	January 7	March 25	Season Ended	
Naotora: The Lady Warlord	NHK	January 8	December 17	Series Ended	
Gabriel DropOut	Tokyo MX	January 9	March 27	Season Ended	
Kemono Friends	TV Tokyo	January 10	March 28	Season Ended	
Keyabingo! 2	Nippon Television	January 10	March 27	Season Ended	
Miss Kobayashi's Dragon Maid	Tokyo MX	January 11	April 6	Season Ended	
Konosuba – Season 2	Tokyo MX	January 11	March 15	Season Ended	
Kuzu no Honkai (Anime)	Fuji Television	January 12	March 30	Series Ended	
Rewrite 2nd Season: Moon/Terra Arc	Tokyo MX	January 14	March 25	Series Ended	
Kuzu no Honkai (Drama)	Fuji Television	January 18	April 5	Series Ended	
BanG Dream!	Tokyo MX	January 21	April 22	Season Ended	
Tofu Pro-Wrestling	TV Asahi	January 21	July 1	Series Ended	
Kirakira PreCure a la Mode	TV Asahi	February 5	January 28, 2018	Ending 2018	
Uchuu Sentai Kyuranger	TV Asahi	February 12	February 4, 2018	Ending 2018	
Boku no Hero Academia – Season 2	Nippon Television	April 1	September 30	Season Ended; Renewed for 3rd Season	
Shingeki no Kyojin – Season 2	Tokyo MX	April 1	June 17	Season Ended; Renewed for 3rd Season	
Idol x Warrior Miracle Tunes!	TV Tokyo	April 2	March 25, 2018	Ending 2018	
News Check 11	NHK World Premium	April 3	Currently Airing	Continues 2018	
Hiyokko	NHK	April 3	September 30	Series Ended	
Otoppe	NHK	April 3	Currently Airing	Continues 2018	
Idol Time PriPara	TV Tokyo	April 4	March 27, 2018	Ending 2018	
Boruto: Naruto Next Generations	TV Tokyo	April 5	Currently Airing	Continues 2018	
Renai Boukun	TV Tokyo	April 6	June 22	Series Ended	
Re:Creators	Tokyo MX	April 8	September 16	Series Ended	
Eromanga Sensei	Tokyo MX	April 8	June 24	Season Ended	
WorldEnd	Tokyo MX	April 11	June 27	Series Ended	
Nogibingo! 8	Nippon Television	April 11	June 27	Season Ended	
Dungeon ni Deai: Sword Oratoria	Tokyo MX	April 14	June 30	Season Ended	
Sin Nanatsu no Taizai	Tokyo MX	April 14	July 29	Series Ended	
Yu-Gi-Oh! VRAINS	TV Tokyo	May 10	Currently Airing	Continues 2018	
Symphogear AXZ	Tokyo MX	July 1	September 30	Season Ended	
Battle Girl High School	Tokyo MX	July 2	September 17	Series Ended	
Aho Girl	Tokyo MX	July 4	September 19	Series Ended	
Koi to Uso	Tokyo MX	July 4	September 18	Series Ended	
Dive!!	Fuji Television	July 6	September 21	Series Ended	
Ultraman Geed	TV Tokyo	July 8	December 23	Series Ended	
New Game!! (Season 2)	Tokyo MX	July 11	September 26	Season Ended	
Mahōjin Guru Guru	TV Tokyo	July 11	December 19	Series Ended	
Isekai no Smartphone to Tomo ni	Tokyo MX	July 11	September 26	Series Ended	
Hajimete no Gal	Tokyo MX	July 12	September 13	Series Ended	
Gamers!	Tokyo MX	July 13	September 28	Series Ended	
Keyabingo! 3	Nippon Television	July 18	September 26	Season Ended	
Kamen Rider Build	TV Asahi	September 3	Currently Airing	Continues 2018	
Warotenka	NHK	October 2	March 31	Ending 2018	
Black Clover	TV Tokyo	October 3	Currently Airing	Continues 2018	
Mr. Osomatsu (Season 2)	TV Tokyo	October 3	March 27, 2018	Ending 2018	
Food Wars!: Shokugeki no Soma – Season 3	Tokyo Broadcasting System Television	October 4	December 20	Season Ended	
Dream Festival R	Tokyo MX	October 6	December 22	Season Ended	
Cardfight!! Vanguard G: Z	TV Tokyo	October 7	March 31, 2018	Ending 2018	
Love Live! Sunshine!! – Season 2	Tokyo MX	October 7	December 30	Season Ended	
The Idolmaster SideM	Tokyo MX	October 7	December 30	Season Ended	
Blend S	Tokyo MX	October 7	December 23	Season Ended	
My Girlfriend is Shobitch	Tokyo MX	October 11	December 13	Series Ended	
Nogibingo! 9	Nippon Television	October 16	December 25	Season Ended	

== Ending ==
End date	Show	Channel	First aired	Replaced by	Source
January 29	Maho Girls PreCure!	TV Asahi	February 7, 2016	Kirakira PreCure a la Mode	
February 5	Doubutsu Sentai Zyuohger	TV Asahi	February 14, 2016	Uchuu Sentai Kyuranger	
March 17	Hello From Studio Park	NHK	March 22, 1995	Afternoon Live	
March 23	Naruto Shippuden	TV Tokyo	February 15, 2007	Boruto: Naruto Next Generations	
March 26	Yu-Gi-Oh! Arc-V	TV Tokyo	April 6, 2014	Yu-Gi-Oh! VRAINS	
March 28	PriPara	TV Tokyo	July 5, 2014	Idol Time PriPara	
April 1	Beppinsan	NHK	October 3, 2016	Hiyokko	
June 29	HKT48 no Odekake!	Tokyo Broadcasting System Television	January 25, 2013	Love Toss (Season 6)	
August 27	Kamen Rider Ex-Aid	TV Asahi	October 2, 2016	Kamen Rider Build	
September 24	Cardfight!! Vanguard G: NEXT	TV Tokyo	October 2, 2016	Cardfight!! Vanguard G: Z	
September 24	Heybot!	TV Asahi	September 18, 2017	Sunday Live	

== Sports ==
Airdate	Sports	Network	Source
October 8	2017 Formula One World Championship	Fuji TV Next	
October 15	2017 MotoGP World Championship	G+	

== Special Events & Milestone Episodes in 2017 ==
Airdate	Show	Network	Source
January 1	Masashi Sada's Midnight Talk-Show: New Year's SP	NHK	
March 20	NHK Nodojiman Champion Taikai 2017	NHK	
March 23	Naruto Shippuden #500 – Series Finale; The Message	TV Tokyo, Crunchyroll	
March 25	Masashi Sada's Midnight Talk-Show: Spring SP	NHK	
April 9	Nogizaka Under Construction #100; Introduce the 3rd Generation! Part 2	TV Tokyo	
June 17	AKB48 49th Senbatsu Sousenkyo Special	Fuji Television	
June 28	TV Tokyo Music Festival	TV Tokyo	
July 1	The Music Day 2017	Nippon Television	
July 23	Dragon Ball Super #100; Out of Control! The Savage Berserker Awakens!!	Fuji Television, Crunchyroll	
August 2	FNS Uta no Natsu Matsuri 2017	Fuji Television	
August 6	One Piece #800; The First and the Second Join! The Vinsmoke Family	Fuji Television, Crunchyroll	
August 26	One Piece: Episode of East Blue: Luffy and His 4 Crewmates' Big Adventure	Fuji Television	
August 26 & 27	24 Hour Television 2017	Nippon Television	
September 2	Symphogear Live 2016 (Digest)	Tokyo MX	
September 9 & 10	FNS 27 Hour TV	Fuji Television	
September 18	Music Station Ultra Fes 2017	TV Asahi	
October 1	One Piece; 1 Hour Special	Fuji Television	
October 8	Dragon Ball Super; 1 Hour Special	Fuji Television	
October 31	AKB48: Mayu Watanabe's Graduation Concert - Live in Saitama	BS Sky Perfect	
November 9	Pokémon #1000; Mission: Total Recall!	TV Tokyo	
November 19	Animelo Summer Live 2017: The Card; Day 1 (August 25, 2017)	BS Premium	
November 26	Animelo Summer Live 2017: The Card; Day 2 (August 26, 2017)	BS Premium	
December 3	Animelo Summer Live 2017: The Card; Day 3 (August 27, 2017)	BS Premium	
December 6	2017 FNS Music Festival; Part 1	Fuji Television	
December 13	2017 FNS Music Festival; Part 2	Fuji Television	
December 22	Music Station Super Live 2017	TV Asahi	
December 30	59th Japan Record Awards	Tokyo Broadcasting System	
December 31	68th NHK Kōhaku Uta Gassen	NHK	
December 31	Johnny's Countdown 2017-18	Fuji Television	

== Deaths ==
Date	Name	Age	Notability	Source
January 3	Shigeru Kōyama	87	Actor	
January 21	Hiroki Matsukata	74	Actor	
January 25	Shunji Fujimura	82	Actor	
February 8	Rina Matsuno	18	Idol and member from Shiritsu Ebisu Chugaku	
February 8	Yoshio Tsuchiya	89	Actor	
February 13	Seijun Suzuki	93	Film and television director, actor, and screenwriter	
March 4	Takashi Inoue	56	Actor	
March 14	Tsunehiko Watase	72	Actor	
March 21	Jiro Inao	48	Theater manager from JKT48	
March 22	Daisuke Satō	52	Manga artist, creator of Highschool of the Dead	
April 12	Peggy Hayama	83	Japanese singer	
April 13	Norio Shioyama	77	Animator, illustrator, character designer, and animation director	
May 3	Yumeji Tsukioka	94	Actress	
May 15	Takeshi Kusaka	86	Actor and voice actor	
May 18	Tatsuya Nōmi	47	Actor	
June 13	Yōko Nogiwa	81	Actress	
June 22	Mao Kobayashi	34	Actress and newscaster	
July 8	Seiji Yokoyama	82	Music composer from Saint Seiya, Winspector and Metalder.	
July 11	Keisuke Sagawa	80	Actor	
July 21	Masaaki Hirao	79	Music composer and NHK Kōhaku Uta Gassen's "Hotaru no Hikari" conductor from 2006 to 2016.	
July 24	Keisuke Yamakawa	74	Japanese Enka singer and lyricist from several tokusatsu series	
August 7	Haruo Nakajima	88	Suit actor from Ultra Series and Godzilla	
August 29	Nobuyuki Furuta	59	Japanese voice actor from Yu Yu Hakusho.	
September 8	Toshihiko Nakajima	55	Voice actor and sound director.	
September 29	Ryūji Saikachi	89	Died from Congestive Heart Failure.	
November 16	Hiromi Tsuru	57	Voice Actress, notable for acting as Bulma, in Dragon Ball series.	
December 15	Michiru Shimada	58	Scriptwritter from anime series Little Witch Academia	

== See also ==
- 2017 in anime
- 2017 in Japan
- 2017 in Japanese music
- List of Japanese films of 2017
