= List of Bobobo-bo Bo-bobo chapters =

Cover of the first North American Bobobo-bo Bo-bobo volume, released by Viz Media on August 5, 2008

The chapters of the Japanese manga series Bobobo-bo Bo-bobo and its sequel Shinsetsu Bobobo-bo Bo-bobo, were written and illustrated by Yoshio Sawai and published in Shueisha's Weekly Shonen Jump. The series was licensed for an English-language release in North America by Viz Media, who chose to release a single stand alone released an interlude in the series. The volume was released under their "SJ Advanced" label on November 8, 2005. The next American release of Bobobo-bo Bo-bobo would begin serialization in Shonen Jump in July 2007 with chapter 110, with Viz then releasing the Japanese volume 11 as volume 1 under Viz's normal Shonen Jump imprint.

== Volumes ==
=== Bobobo-bo Bo-bobo ===
No.	Title	Original release date	English release date
01	Hajike Festival; Hajike Matsuri (ハジケ祭り)	July 4, 2001; 4-08-873138-7	—
001. "Hair" (毛, Ke); 002. "Pervert" (変態, Hentai); 003. "Hajike Festival" (ハジケ祭り, Hajike Matsuri); 004. "Christmas" (クリスマス, Kurisumasu); 005. "Myth" (神話, Shinwa); 006. "Party" (コンパ, Konpa); 007. "Full of Memories" (思い出がいっぱい, Omoide ga Ippai); 008. "Cycling" (サイクリング, Saikuringu); 009. "Love Labyrinth" (ラブ·ラビリンス, Labu•Labirinsu); 010. "Lakeside Death Match" (湖畔の死闘, Kohan no Shitō)
In the year 300X, Czar Baldy Bald the IV declares a Hair Hunt, forcing everyone in the empire to be bald. However, his Hair Hunter forces face resistance from the infamous "Fist of the Nosehair" master and weird wiggin' specialist warrior Bobobo-bo Bo-bobo. Bo-bobo is joined by Beauty, a teen girl he saves from a Hair Hunt platoon. At a festival, Bo-bobo meets Don Patch, Wiggin' Gang leader who accuses him of being a Hair Hunter before the two are forced to work together to defeat the real culprits. Don Patch decides to leave his gang and join the duo, where the three drive each other crazy and encounter more Hair Hunters, including an alien who is looking for a boy who saved Beauty's life while Bo-bobo and Don Patch were elsewhere.
02	Someone Please Stop Those Three (by Beauty); Dare ka Ano 3-Ri o Tomete Kudasai (by Byuti) (誰かあの3人を止めて下さい (by ビュテイ))	September 4, 2001; 4-08-873161-1	—
011. "I Won't Lose!" (負けられねぇんだよ!, Makerarenee Nda Yo!); 012. "Unexpected Stopover Journey" (ぶらり途中下車の旅, Burari Tochū Gesha no Tabi); 013. "Assault!! Aitsuhage Tower" (突撃!!アイツハゲ•タワー, Totsugeki!! Aitsuhage•Tawā); 014. "You're Wrong ~I'm Not Poop~" (違うって ~オレウンコじゃねぇって〜, Chigautte ~Ore Unko ja nētte~); 015. "Not Poop, Then What!?" (ウンコじゃなきゃなんなんだ!?, Unko Ja Nakya Nannanda!?); 016. "Someone Please Stop Those Three (by Beauty)" (誰かあの3人を止めてください (by ビュティ), Dareka Ano Sannin o Tomete Kudasai (by Byutei)); 017. "A New Assassin" (新たなる刺客, Aratanaru Shikaku); 018. "A Fart's Feeling is Whimsical♥" (おならの気持ちは気まぐれなの♥, Onara no Kimochi wa Kimagure na no♥); 019. "Goodbye Aitsuhage Tenaka Tower" (さらばアイツハゲテナカッ•タワー, Saraba Aitsuhage Tenaka•Tawā); 020. "Welcome Gas-can to Bo-bobo Class" (ようこそヘッくんボーボボ組へ, Yōkoso Hekkun Bo-bobo Gumi e)
In another town, Beauty and Don Patch are attacked by a Hair-Loss Beam, forcing Bo-bobo to travel to C-Block's Aitsuhage Tower to get the cure. While climbing the tower, the team encounter "Fist of Blabs-a-Lot" warrior Softon, who cures Beauty before fighting Bo-bobo and losing his battle and his mind in the insane Bo-bobo World. At the top of the tower, the team is saved by the mysterious boy Gasser, who helps them escape from the tower while choosing to learn from Bo-bobo how to get stronger.
03	Bo-bobo vs. Jelly Jiggler; Bōbobo VS Tokoro Tennosuke (ボーボボVSところ天の助)	December 4, 2001; 4-08-873198-0	—
021. "That's Not The Reason" (そんなワケない, Sonna Wake Nai); 022. "Homecoming" (帰省, Kisei); 023. "A Gift from Jelly Jiggler" (ところてんへの贈り物, Tokoroten e no Okurimono); 024. "Amusement Parks are Wonderful!!" (遊園地ってすばらしい!!, Yūenchi tte Subarashī!!); 025. "I Love Math, 1•2•3!!" (算数だいすき1•2•3!!, Sansū Daisuki 1•2•3!!); 026. "Turtle Rap" (亀ラップ, Kame Rappu); 027. "A Haunted House, Farts and a Wedding" (オバケ屋敷とオナラと結婚と, Obakeyashiki to Onara to Kekkon to); 028. "Rose" (薔薇, Bara); 029. "The Released Farts..." (解き放たれたオナラたちへ。。。, Tokihanatareta Onara-tachi e...); 030. "Bo-bobo vs. Jelly Jiggler" (ボーボボVSところ天の助, Bo-bobo tai Tokoroten no Suke); 031. "Jihad" (聖戦, Jihādo)
While teaching Gasser how to fight, Bo-bobo grows an amusement park where he must free an ally from the clutches of the wobbly Jelly Jiggler. During their trip, Bo-bobo helps a Hair Hunter with problems, Don Patch fights against a former lover, Gasser reveals the stinky secret of his "Fist of the Backwind", and Beauty just puts up with all of it. By the time Jelly Jiggler finally reveals himself, the battle goes in every direction, with the wobbly warrior going back and forth between being an enemy and joining in on Bo-bobo and Don Patch's madness.
04	It's 5 on 5! Everyone Come Together; 5 Tai 5 da Yo! Zen'in Shūgō (5対5だヨ! 全員集合)	March 4, 2002; 4-08-873234-0	—
032. "Overcoming Sadness" (せつなさにのせて, Setsunasa ni Nosete); 033. "Ever Free" (エバーフリー, Ebā Furī); 034. "Interview Expert" (面接の達人, Mensetsu no Tatsujin); 035. "Destiny Intertwined by Nosehairs" (鼻毛に絡められた宿命, Hanage ni Karamerareta Shukumei); 036. "Fundoshi-senpai" (ふんどし先輩, Fundoshi Senpai); 037. "Meeting of the 5 Warriors" (集いし5人の戦士, Tsudoishi 5-nin no Senshi); 038. "Go to the Pomade Ring: The Story of the 5 of Us" (ポメードリングに行く 僕達5人の物語, Pomēdo Ringu ni Iku Boku-tachi 5-nin no Monogatari); 039. "Wings, Please" (翼をください, Tsubasa wo Kudasai); 040. "It's 5 on 5! Everyone Come Together" (5対5だヨ! 全員集合, 5 Tai 5 Da Yo! Zenin Shūgō); 041. "Gasser's Embarrassing Past" (ヘッポコマルの恥ずかしい過去, Heppokomaru no Hazukashī Kako); 042. "Hiding Away That Body" (めくりめくられこの体, Mekurimekurareko no Karada)
After Bo-bobo and Don Patch (literally) come together to stop Jelly Jiggler, Bo-bobo soon encounters his greatest rival: the ducktailed nosehair user Gunkan. Stealing away Beauty by turning her into a doll, Bo-bobo puts together a team of allies and former rivals to invade the Pomade Ring headquarters and get her back. After getting past initial defenses, Bo-bobo's team faces off against Gunkan's main warriors: The Battleship Five Quartet, who prove their strength in each of their battles against Bo-bobo's allies.
05	We've Done It! Thanks Everyone for Our First Year; Yattaze! Min'na no Okage de 1-Shūnen (やったぜ! みんなのおかげで1周年)	May 1, 2002; 4-08-873258-8	—
043. "Great Fierce Battle!! Bo-bobo World" (大激戦!! 聖鼻毛領域!!, Daigekisen!! Bo-bobo•Wārudo); 044. "Bo-bobo: Go to Babylon" (ボーボボ バビロン界え行く, Bo-bobo Babironkai e Iku); 045. "The Terrible Babylon Guides" (バビロン案内隊の恐怖, Babiron Annaitai no Kyōfu); 046. "New Ultimate Technique" (新必殺技, Shin Hissatsu Waza); 047. "Fate X Nosehair X Decisive Battle" (因縁×鼻毛×決戦, Innen X Hanage X Kessen); 048. "It's Gunkan" (軍艦です, Gunkan Desu); 049. "It's Bo-bobo" (ボーボボです, Bo-bobo Desu); 050. "He That Worries Me" (気になるアイツ, Ki ni Naru Aitsu); 051. "The Day the Sun Fell" (太陽に堕ちた日, Taiyō ni Ochita Hi); 052. "Reviving the Tiger Who Became Empty" (甦りし虚ろなる虎, Yomigaerishi Utsuro Naru Tora); 053. "We've Done It! Thanks Everyone for Our First Year" (やったぜ! みんなのおかげで1周年, Yatta Ze! Minna no Okage de 1 Shūnen)
With the battle against Gunkan's forces not going as planned, Softon makes Bo-bobo train in Babylon World to create a super technique to stop his rival. Once facing each other in battle, though, Bo-bobo and Gunkan use every nosehair and Hajike trick in their books before Bo-bobo's technique and Gunkan's desire for forgiveness brings his downfall. As Bo-bobo's team continues to journey, they soon encounter cool "Fist of the Key" warrior (and obsessive Don Patch fan) Hatenko, who leads them into a trap at a massive mansion.
06	DedededeDengakuman; DedededeDengakuman (でででで田楽マン)	August 2, 2002; 4-08-873325-8	—
054. Just Wanna Cry; 055. "Famicom Generation's Counterattack" (ファミコン世代の逆襲, Famikon Sedai no Gyakushū); 056. "End of the Ugly Quarrel" (醜い争いの結末, Minikui Arasoi no Ketsumatsu); 057. "Summer! The Sea! Splitting Watermelon!! Yay~~!!!!" (夏だ!海だ!すいか割だ!!わ〜〜!!!!, Natsu da! Umi da! Suikawari da !! Wa~~!!!!); 058. "Don Patch's Masterpiece Theater" (首領パッチ名作劇場, Don Pacchi Meisaku Gekijō); 059. "A Quiz, Boing! Boing! Boing! Boing! I'm Not a Frog I'm Dengaku!" (クイズだぴょん! ぴょん! ぴょん! ぴょん! カエルじゃないよ田楽だよ!, Quizu da Pyon! Pyon! Pyon! Pyon! Kaeru ja nai yo Dengaku da yo!); 060. "Secret of Z-Block Base" (Zブロック基地の秘密, Zeddo Burokku Kichi no Himitsu); 061. "First-Class" (上等, Jōtō); 062. "Plan to Become a Dragon" (ドラゴン化計画, Doragon-ka Keikaku); 063. "Heart" (こころん, Kokoron); 064. "DedededeDengakuman" (でででで田楽マン, DedededeDengaku Man); 065. "Owner of a Tough Heart" (強靭なる心の持ち主, Kyōjin Naru Kokoro no Mochinushi)
Inside the Evil House of Blood, Bo-bobo is brainwashed by a lizard scientist to turn against his friends until Hatenko finally frees him and everyone escapes. After a battle on a beach against a team of robots, Bo-bobo's team arrives at the enigmatic Z-Block led by cute leader Dengakuman and pass through several trials, including a game show and a fight inside a giant television before facing the warrior in Hajike combat. However, Dengakuman soon manipulates Bo-bobo to either be his friend or help him make new ones.
07	Let's Go Three-Idiot Trio; Sore ike 3 Baka Torio (それいけ3バカトリオ)	November 1, 2002; 4-08-873339-8	—
066. "Can I Make 100 Friends?" (友達100人できるかな?, Tomodachi 100 Nin Dekiru Ka Na?); 067. "Fierce Battle Curtain Raising!!" (激戦開幕!!, Gekisen Kaimaku!!); 068. "Unbuyable Bungling Bay" (買わなきゃバンゲリング•ベイ, Kawanakya Bangeringu•Bei); 069. "Tea Ceremony Panic!!" (茶道パニック!!, Sadō Panikku!!); 070. "Here's Bo-bobo!!" (これがボーボボ!!, Kore ga Bo-bobo!!); 071. "Rice" (お米, Okome); 072. "Let's Go Three-Idiot Trio" (それいけ3バカトリオ, Sore Ike 3 Baka Torio); 073. "Summit" (頂点, Chōten); 074. "The Hajikelists' Party" (ハジケ者たちの宴, Hajikemono-tachi no Utage); 075. "Final Battle for the Top" (頂上決戦, Chōjō Kessen); 076. "Look at the Frog" (カエルに見える, Kaeru ni Mieru)
Proving Dengakuman's selfishness in friendship, Bo-bobo defeats him easily. Soon after, an encounter with a Hajikelist assassin leads the team into the insane Hajike Block, where Bo-bobo and Don Patch enter bizarre combat and Jelly Jiggler rejoins the team permanently. At the top of the tower, Bo-bobo is forced to face current "King of Hajikelists" Rice or risk his allies turning into pandas. After showing Rice who the greatest Hajikelist really is, Bo-bobo takes the title for himself, but is soon sent by another assassin towards fighting the chaotic Hair Hunt leader OVER.
08	Majide Time; M T (M • T)	March 4, 2003; 4-08-873393-2	—
077. "Concealed in Kindness" (やさしさに包まれたなら, Yasashisa ni Tsutsumareta Nara); 078. "Introducing Ruby-chan!!" (ルビーちゃん登場!!, Rubī-chan Tōjyō!!); 079. "Number 10's Pressure" (背番号10の重圧, Sebangō 10 no Jūatsu); 080. "The Trembler's Trap" (ワナワナで罠, Wanawana de Wana); 081. "Bo-bobo All-Stars' Great Fray" (ボーボボオールスターズ大乱闘, Bo-bobo Ōrusutāzu Dairantō); 082. "Sparked from True Instinct" (本能のままにスパーク!!, Honnō no Mama ni Supāku!!); 083. "Merrymaking on the Toilet-Seat Top" (便座の上でハシャぎすぎ, Benza no Ue de Hashagisugi); 084. "Majide Time" (M • T, Majide Taimu); 085. "OVER the Ultimate Evil vs. Bo-bobo the Worst" (最凶OVERたい最低ボーボボ, Saikyō Ōbā tai Saitei Bo-bobo); 086. "My First Aerial Battle is Heart-Pounding♥" (初めての空中戦にマジドキ♥, Hajimete no Kūchūsen ni Majidoki♥); 087. "Game Over" (ゲームオーバー, Gēmu Ōbā)
Inside OVER's base, Bo-bobo's team face against his Ultimate Five Assassins, including a little girl, a soccer-themed boy and a bizarre ninja trio. Yet with teamwork, the return of Dengakuman and the mysterious power of Majide Time, they finally reach the scissor-manipulating warrior in cannon-flying combat. Yet by both combative and Hajike means, Bo-bobo, Don Patch and Jelly Jiggler wear down their opponent to the point where he is forced to transform into his true form: Idiot-killer Torpedo Girl.
09	Hair-Raising Fun; San Baka Bāsasu Gyorai (3バカVS魚雷)	June 4, 2003; 4-08-873437-8	November 8, 2005 (ch. 93–98); 978-1-4215-0235-9
088. "Invincible" (無敵, Muteki); 089. "Three Idiots vs. The Torpedo" (3バカVS魚雷, San Baka Bāsasu Gyorai); 090. "It's Here: Bo-bobo World" (でちゃった♥聖鼻毛領域, Dechatta♥Bo-bobo•Wārudo); 091. "Engulfed in Space..." (宇宙に包まれて。。。, Uchū ni Tsutsumarete...); 092. "Full Speed at the Evil One!!!" (悪いヤツらをぶっとばせ!!!, Warui Yatsura wo Buttobase!!!); 093. "Challenger" (チャレンジャ, Charenjya); 094. "It’s CHUGA CHUGA Time!!" (シュッポッポだぜっ!!, Shuppoppo Da Ze!!"; lit.: It's a Steam Train!!); 095. "Boyhood" (少年時代, Shōnen Jidai"; lit.: Era of Youth); 096. "Nightmare Nightmare Nightmare" (悪夢•悪夢•悪夢, Akumu • Akumu • Akumu); 097. "Three Murderous Fiends" (三人の殺人鬼, Sannin no Satsujinki); 098. "I am the Main Character!!!" (オレが主人公だ!!!, Ore ga Shujinkō Da!!!)
Against Torpedo Girl, all of the Hajikelist's attacks seem to do nothing against even harming her. However, by means of several ultimate attacks, Bo-bobo finally turns her back into OVER and puts a stop to him. Though with him defeated, the team is led by Gunkan assistant Suzu towards the most powerful of Tsurulina's guardians: the money-grubbing Halekulani. Traveling to the amusement park base of Hallelujah Land, the team goes through several deadly attractions as they break the park apart in order to show their presence.
10	Hair-Raising Fun; 100 Man Oku no Bo-bobo (100万億のボーボボ)	September 4, 2003; 4-08-873507-2	November 8, 2005 (ch. 99–107); 978-1-4215-0235-9
099. "The Four Strongest People Have Gathered" (最強の4人集う!, Saikyō no Yonnin Tsudō!); 100. "We’re All Here!! A Big Battle With Kicking And Punching!!" (大集合!!蹴って殴って大乱闘!!, Daishūgō!! Kette Nagutte Dairantō!!); 101. "Crash" (激突, Gekitotsu); 102. "They Are Underestimating Us!!" (ナメられてます!!, Nameraretemasu!!"; lit: Making Fun of Us!!); 103. "Money or the Nose Hair" (金か鼻毛か, Kane ka Hanage ka); 104. "Scary Board Game Battle" (恐怖のスゴロクバトル, Kyōfu no Sugoroku Batoru"; lit.: Terrible Sugoroku Battle); 105. "Alone On The Platform" (独壇場, Dokudanjyō"; lit.: Unchallenged Zone); 106. "One Trillion Dollar Bo-BoBo" (100万億のボーボボ, 100 Man Oku no Bo-bobo"; lit.: Bo-bobo the One-Hundred Trillion); 107. "What's Important!!" (大切なもの!!, Taisetsu na Mono!!"; lit.: Important Thing!!); 108. "Challenge from Cyber City" (サイバー都市からの挑戦状, Saibā Toshi Kara no Chōsenjyō); 109. "Sphere-Prison Execution Stand" (球獄処刑場, Kyūgoku Shokeijyō)
Rejoined by Softon, Bo-bobo's squad defeat the last of Halekulani's guardians before facing the greedy leader in a battle where they fight against money and in the domain of bizarre board games. Bo-bobo defeats him by showing him there is more to life than money. Yet even with his defeat, the allies soon discover Gasser abducted at the park by the guardians of prison island Cyber City, led by artistic fist collector Giga. En route to their destination, Torpedo Girl becomes an unexpected ally who gets them to the island.
11	Hair-Raising Fun; Kokoro ni Todoku Uta (心に届く歌)	December 4, 2003; 4-08-873536-6	August 5, 2008; 978-1-4215-0272-4
110. "Bet On Bo-bobo" (賭けてボーボボ, Kakete Bo-bobo); 111. "The Fun Bungee Fair" (おもしろバンジー祭り, Omoshiro Banjī Matsuri"; Fun Bungee Festival); 112. "Crisscross" (縦横無尽, Jyūō Mujin"; As You Please); 113. "Bo-bobo get mad about it" (ボーボボ怒る!!, Bo-bobo Ikaru!!"; Bo-bobo is Angry!!); 114. "Double Deathmatch" (2つの死闘, Daburu•Uō); 115. "Anger Explosion X2" (怒激X2, Dogeki X 2"; Wrath X 2); 116. "The Emissary of the Black Sun" (黒太陽の使者, Kurotaiyō no Shisha"; Messenger of the Black Sun); 117. "Pure Miscalculation" (汚れなき誤算, Kegarenaki Gosan); 118. "A song that touches the heart" (心に届く歌, Kokoro ni Todoku Uta); 119. "Giga! I'll never forgive you!!" (ギガ!オレはお前を許さない!!, Giga! Ore wa Omae wo Yurusanai!!); 120. "Get on with it, you idiot!" (突き進む3バカ!!, Tsukisusumu 3 Baka!!)
On Cyber City, Bo-bobo's team is forced to face the Six Cyber Knights in combat as varied as road fighting, bungee jumping and manipulation of words and "the black sun". Yet Bo-bobo's team uses their own battle strategies, including magical boxes, torpedo power and an unexpected magical girl transformation before finally being seen by Giga. However, the artistic warrior attempts to befuddles his opponents with the power of his genius without even using any of his true fist abilities, yet with Bo-bobo matching him attack after attack.
12	So Hairy, It's Scary; Gekisen Kaimaku Sangaria!! (激戦開幕3狩リア!!)	March 4, 2004; 4-08-873575-7	May 5, 2009; 978-1-4215-2194-7
121. "Giving it their all!" (互いの本気, Tagai no Honki); 122. "Climb up! The stairway battle!!" (登れ登れ!階段バトル!!, Nobore Nobore! Kaidan Batoru!!); 123. "Go, art!!" (突っ走れ芸術, Tsubbashire Āto!!!); 124. "Macho Men" (漢, Otoko); 125. "100 Years Ago" (100年前から, 100 Nen Mae Kara); 126. "It's Five Against Five!!" (はっちゃけろ5対5!!, Hacchakero 5 Tai 5!!); 127. "I'm Gonna Power Up!" (パワーアップしちゃうぞ!!, Pawā Appu Shichauzo!!); 128. "As The Flowers Bloom The Idiot Thrives" (花乱れてバカ冴える, Hana Mitarete Baka Saeru); 129. "A Super Kind of Guy" (スーパーなヤツ, Sūpā na Yatsu); 130. "Nose Vs. Flower" (鼻VS花, Hana Bāsasu Hana); 131. "Battle of Sangaria Begins!" (激戦開幕3狩リア!!, Gekisen Kaimaku Sangaria!!)
With the full power of his art, Giga continues to defeat the Hajike warriors, powering himself and threatening to destroy his greatest works before Bo-bobo puts a stop to him with a combination of his own art and nosehair abilities. Yet on the way back from Cyber City, the squad soon encounters new enemies from the Former Maruhage Empire of one-hundred years ago, awakening to take them apart. Training at a holy land (a shopping mall) and acquiring a new "super" jacket, Bo-bobo and his allies storm towards the headquarters of their new enemy: a new amusement park that used to hold Jelly Jiggler's A-Block.
13	Dirty...Hairy... Pacchi Bobo no Yūutsu (パッチボボの憂鬱)	June 4, 2004; 4-08-873609-5	March 2, 2010; 978-1-4215-3127-4
132. "This is It? New Trio" (こんなのアリ?新3人組, Konna no Ari? Shin 3-Ningumi); 133. "Captured...SF World" (攻略せよ。。。SFワールド, Kōryakuse yo...Esu Efu Wārudo); 134. "7 Mysteries" (7•ミステリー, Sebun•Misuterī); 135. "Battlefield Blues" (戦場ブルース, Senjyō Burūsu); 136. "The Torpedo and Combat" (魚雷とコンバットと, Gyorai to Konbatto to); 137. "The Big Wheels in Motion" (動き出す実力者達, Ugokidasu Jitsuryokusha-tachi); 138. "He's Here! The Amazing Guy Who Wins By a Mile!!" (出た!ぶっちぎりのすげえヤツ!!, Deta! Bucchigiri no Sugē Yatsu!!); 139. "PatchBobo's Depression" (パッチボボの憂鬱, Pacchibobo no Yūutsu); 140. "Forbidden Strong Triangle Attack" (禁断の激強三角関係, Kindan no Gekitsuyo Toraianguru); 141. "Extremely Strong Helper? The Great Free-for-All!" (超強力な助っ人?大混戦だぜ!, Chōkyōryoku na Suketto? Daikonsen da ze!); 142. "The Three Hajikelists" (3人のハジケリスト, 3-Nin no Hajikelisuto)
Going through the Former Maruhage territory, Bo-bobo and his allies go through one ride battle after another, including a Gadget battle against a living bowl of shaved ice, a water slide against a military pervert, an ice-top mecha battle against a windy warrior (and where Don Patch causes a strange fusion switch), a chaotic merry-go-round and a massive coin machine where Bo-bobo must get even more help to defeat the enemies inside, starting with a blowhard bubble fighter.
14	Bo-bobo vs. Hanpen; Bō-bobo VS Hanpen (ボーボボVSハンペン)	September 3, 2004; 4-08-873648-6	June 08, 2010; 978-1-4215-3128-1
143. "Full-Throttle Service! The Great Escape Play!!" (サービス全開!大脱出劇!!, Sābisu Zenkai! Daidashutsugeki!!); 144. "Who's That Guy!? Goemon Surprise" (なんだヤツは!?ゴエモンビックリ!, Nanda Yatsu wa!? Goemon Bikkuri!); 145. "Rem Rem Re-m Rem" (レムレムレームレム, Remu Remu Rēmu Remu); 146. "Great Sleep Battle!!" (超睡眠バトル!!, Chōsuimin Batoru!!); 147. "Bo-bobo World Nightmare" (聖鼻毛悪夢領域, Bo-bobo•Wārudo•Naitomea); 148. "Enter Lambada of the Three Strengths" (三強ランバダ、登場!, Sankyō Lanbada, Tōjyō!); 149. "Nosehair Valley's Polygon" (鼻毛の谷のポリゴン, Hanage no Tani no Porigon); 150. "Go Retro!" (レトロでGO!, Retoro de Gō!); 151. "Bo-bobo vs. Hanpen" (ボーボボVSハンペン, Bo-bobo Bāsasu Hanpen); 152. "Ascending, Shortening Duo" (登りつめし2人, Nobori Tsumeshi 2-Ri); 153. "Great Free-For-All! Nonsense 9/Strong Oden 3 Sangaria" (大混戦!ハチャメチャ9強おでん3狩リア, Daikonsen! Hachamecha 9 Kyō Oden 3 Sangaria)
Inside the coin machine, Bo-bobo's squad faces even more powerful and bizarre opponents: from a dream-manipulating narcoleptic to a creature summoner (and famed thief) to even a warrior who manipulates shape structures! Yet even after surviving all of them, there's still the problem of the most powerful block leader: Hanpen, a living fishcake who thrusts them into a soupy showdown and against his nearly invincible abilities...and whom Jelly Jiggler keeps trying to desperately fight in a food battle.
15	Humans are La La La; Ningen nante Ra Ra Ra (人間なんて ららら)	December 3, 2004; 4-08-873681-8	October 5, 2010; 978-1-4215-3352-0
154. "Awakening Boy Soldier" (目覚める少年戦士, Mezameru Shōnen Senshi); 155. "Tenbobo vs. Hanpen" (天ボボVSハンペン, Tenbobo Bāsasu Hanpen); 156. "Emperor Baldy Bald the III" (皇帝ツル•ツルリナ3世, Kōtei Tsuru•Tsururina 3-Sei); 157. "The Ones that Move History" (歴史を動かせし者達, Rekishi wo Ugokaseshi Mono-tachi); 158. "Worst Case Scenario" (最悪のシナリオ, Saiaku no Shinario); 159. "Rapid Development! Red and Blue" (急展開!赤と青, Kyūtenkai! Aka to Ao); 160. "Humans are La La La" (人間なんて ららら, Ningen Nante Ra Ra Ra); 161. "Look, Look, Look at Our Lives~!" (オレ達の人生を見て見て見て〜!!, Ore-tachi no Jinsei wo Mite Mite Mite~!); 162. "Convention Opening! Listen to the Screaming Mole!" (大会開催!聴けモグラの叫びを!!, Daikai Kaisai! Kike Mogura no Sakebi wo!!); 163. "Beauty's Close Call!" (ビュテイ危機一髪!, Byutei Kiki Ippatsu!); 164. "Furious The Great Chinese War!!" (激!中華大戦!!, Geki! Chūka Taisen!!)
Bo-bobo and Jelly Jiggler come together to defeat Hanpen, but the entire heroic force isn't in time to stop the reawakening of Former Maruhage master: Czar Baldy bald the III. In a magical showdown with several surprises, Bo-bobo attempts to put a stop to the trickery of the leader, who desires his Hair Ball for his ultimate power. Yet as the Former Maruhage crisis draws to a close, Bo-bobo and allies soon are embroiled in entry to the Maruhage New Emperor Playoff, where enemies both old and new gather for the chance to win leadership of the world!
16	Horrible "Don" Patch; Senritsu no Okon Patchi (戦慄の怒んパッチ)	February 4, 2005; 4-08-873773-3	—
165. "Opening of the New Emperor Playoff!" (新皇帝決定戦開催!, Shinkōtei Ketteisen Kaisai!); 166. "Bo-bobo vs. Nenchaku" (ボーボボVSねんちゃく, Bo-bobo Bāsasu Nenchaku); 167. "Swiftly! Bo-bobo TV Channel!" (つっぱしれ!ボーボボTV局!, Tsuppashire! Bo-bobo TV-kyoku!); 168. "The Man Reimported from the Game Boy Advance!" (GBAから逆輸入の男!, Gēmu Bōi Adobansu Kara Gyakuyunyū no Otoko!); 169. "Yamamba Warning Proclemation!!" (やまんば注意報発令中!!, Yamanba Chūihō Hatsureichū!!); 170. "Samba☆Rhumba☆Mambo: Uh!" (サンバ☆ルンバ☆マンボ うっ!!, Sanba☆Runba☆Manbo U!!); 171. "Rapid Development! BIG" (急展開!BIG, Kyūtenkai! BIG); 172. "Shinken X Yamiken X Fist = Running Wild" (真拳×闇拳×拳=暴走, Shinken x Yamiken x Kobushi = Bōsō); 173. "Angry!" (怒る!, Ikaru!); 174. "Horrible Don Patch" (戦慄の怒んパッチ, Senritsu no Don Pacchi); 175. "Reverse Maruhage Empire and Serviceman" (裏マルハーゲ帝国とサービスマン, Ura Maruhāge Teikoku to Sābisuman)
Winning his way into the contest by force, Bo-bobo begins his journey to destroy the empire once and for all. But while it initially seems like merely defeating Tsurulina's forces, the tournament is suddenly invaded by warriors from the Reverse Maruhage Empire, who fight to make their own leader the new emperor. After unexpected circumstances (including an alliance with Hanpen and Don Patch's ultimate angry power), Bo-bobo's team arrives at the castle, but is too late to prevent the start of the Reverse Maruhage's ultimate plan. (even if they help them get it done)
17	Examining Room of Death! His Name is Byakkyō; Shi no Shinsatsu-Shitsu! Yatsu no na wa Byakkyō (死の診察室! ヤツの名は白狂)	May 2, 2005; 4-08-873804-7	—
176. "Revival! Bo-bobo" (再燃!ボーボボ, Sainen! Bo-bobo); 177. "Picture Book Paradise" (絵本パラダイス, Ehon Paradaisu); 178. "Let's Go Everyone Showdown! Dark vs. Us" (行くぜ全面対決!闇VSオレら, Ikuze Zenmen Taiketsu! Yami Bāsasu Orera); 179. "Bo-bobo All Star's Great Dash!!" (ボーボボオールスターズ大爆進!!, Bo-bobo Ōrusutāzu Daibakushin!!); 180. "Rise Up! Tomorrow's Movie Star" (のしあがれ!明日の映画スター, Noshiagare! Asu no Eiga Sutā); 181. "Shaky-Gamble Bull-docking Headlock!!" (ギャンブルブルブルブルドッキングヘッドロック!!, Gyanburu Buruburu Burudokkingu Heddorokku!!); 182. "Muscular Muscle: The Deadly Bloody Murder Tactic" (筋肉隆隆 死の血殺戦術, Kinniku Ryūryū Shi no Kessatsu Senjutsu); 183. "The Torpedo's Descent" (魚雷降臨, Gyorai Kōrin); 184. "Examining Room of Death! His Name is Byakkyō" (死の診察室! ヤツの名は白狂, Shi no Shinsatsushitsu! Yatsu no Na wa Byakkyō); 185. "Dancing Surgery Entrapment Network" (踊る手術包囲網線, Odoru Shujutsu Hōi Mōsen); 186. "Opening! FEVER Motorcross!!!" (全開!FEVERモトクロス!!!, Zenkai! Fuībā Motokurosu!!!)
Even with everyone's assistance, the Reverse Maruhage succeed in raising the castle of their leader Hydrate to the surface, who immediately declares himself emperor. With allies and enemies alike, Bo-bobo's team storm the enemy castle, where they face against enemies such as a three-eyed manipulator, a sexy dominatrix with a muscle fetish and a mad doctor who formerly destroyed forces of Babylon.
18	Ganeme; Ganeme (ガネメ)	August 4, 2005; 4-08-873842-X	—
187. "Final Match of Unity! The End of the Mad Doctor" (結束決戦!マッドオドクターの最期, Kessoku Kessen! Maddo Dokutā no Saigo); 188. "Petal of Morality" (仁義の華, Jingi no Hana); 189. "Ultimate Hair Battle" (毛決戦, Kekessen); 190. "Rhapsody of Nosehair and Leghair" (鼻毛とスネ毛のラプソデイー, Hanage to Sunege no Rapusodeī); 191. "Ganeme" (ガネメ, Ganeme); 192. "Devotion to Him" (アイツに首ったけ, Aitsu ni Kubittake); 193. "Strongest Armor! Break Through the Nyan-Nyan Armor!!" (最堅鎧!ニャンニャンアーマーをつき破れ!!, Saikengai! Nyannyan Āmā wo Tsukiyabure!!); 194. "Hydrate's Secret♥" (ハイドレートのひみちゅ♥, Haidorēto no Himichu♥); 195. "Conclusion!! End of the Dark Empire" (決着!!闇皇帝の最期, Ketchaku!! Yami Kōtei no Saigo); 196. "Hatenko VS Bo-bobo" (破天荒VSボーボボ, Hatenkō Bāsasu Bo-bobo); 197. "Bo-bobo's Request!!" (ボーボボの頼み!!, Bo-bobo no Tanomi!!)
Further into Hydrate's castle, Bo-bobo faces an unexpected enemy: big brother Bebebe-be Be-bebe, forcing him into a showdown between nosehairs and leghairs before Torpedo Girl releases a glasses-powered attack within him that finally allows passage to the enemy's lair. With the combined force of all the allies, Bo-bobo and Don Patch put a stop to Hydrate's ambition, freeing the Maruhage Empire from tyranny once and for all. Yet before things get too peaceful, Hatenko forces Bo-bobo to finally go home to the Hair Kingdom in order to free it from other evils.
19	Bububu-bu Bu-bubu; Bububū-bu Bū-bubu (ブブブーブ ブーブブ)	November 4, 2005; 4-08-873873-X	—
198. "Bi-bibi Sentai • Takoyaki Battle!" (ビービビ戦隊•タコヤキバトル!, Bi-bibi Sentai • Takoyaki Batoru!); 199. "Monster House!!" (モンスターハウス!!, Monsutā Hausu!!); 200. "Bububu-bu Bu-bubu" (ブブブーブ ブーブブ, Bububu-bu Bu-bubu); 201. "It-s the "Keshī Keshi Keshi Battle"♪" (「消死毛4消しバトル」でございまーす♪, 'Keshī Keshi Keshi Batoru' de Gozaimāsu♪); 202. "Moemoe Oyabin Personal Search Journey" (モエモエおやびんの自分探しの旅, Moemoe Oyabin no Jibun Sagashi no Tabi); 203. "Memory ---- Memory Shinken" (メモリーーーーー想い出の真拳, Memorī----Omoide no Shinken); 204. "Bibubebo Bibubebo" (ビブベボ ビブベボ, Bibubebo Bibubebo); 205. "The Vessel is..." (容器として。。。, Hairemono to Shite...); 206. "The Troubled Siblings" (困った兄弟達, Komatta Hitotachi); 207. "Hair Peace" (毛平和, Heā Pīsu); 208. "I'm Not Disposable!" (使い捨てじゃない!, Tsukaisute Ja Nai!)
After gaining forceful passage back into the Hair Kingdom, Bo-bobo and friends ally with his big sister Bububu-bu Bu-bubu (who looks like a certain fusion) against the forces of another of his big brothers: Bibibi-bi Bi-bibi. Along the way, the team begins to face the Hair Kingdom leaders in a variety of combat, Be-bebe also returns to help Bo-bobo fight their brother (when not killing each other), and Jelly Jiggler begins a personal crusade against the forces of tofu.
20	Shigeki vs. Hajike; Shigeki tai Hajike (シゲキ対ハジケ)	February 3, 2006; 4-08-874016-5	—
209. "Omen of Comings and Goings" (はっちゃける前兆, Hacchakeru Zenchō); 210. "Enter the Female Soldier of the Baby-Country Way♥" (バビっとひんやり女戦士登場♥, Babittohin Yari Onna Senshi Tōjō♥); 211. "Can You Do It? Dance-Turn Dancing Battlers♥" (ノッてるかい?踊りまくりのダンシングバトラーズ♥, Notterukai? Odorimakuri no Danshingu Batorāzu♥); 212. "Sensation! Heroic Rashoumon Battle!!" (体感!壮絶羅生門バトル, Taikan! Sōzetsu Rashōmon Batoru); 213. "Gathering of the Big Guns: The Shigekily Athletic's Great Free-For-All!!" (実力者集結 シケキ的アスレチック大混戦!!, Jitsuryokusha Shūketsu: Shigekiteki Asulechikku Daikonsen!!); 214. "Super Spin!! Coming and Going Pinball Great Free-for-All♪" (スーパースピン!!はっちゃけピンボール大混戦♪, Sūpā Supin!! Hacchake Pinbōru Daikonsen♪); 215. "Squishy Feeling Exposed♥: Tofu Cube Festival!!" (プニプニ感丸出し♥ 豆腐キューブフェステイバル!!, Punipunikan Marudashi♥: Tōfu Kyūbu Fesuteibaru!!); 216. "Crush Wandering Tofu, Three-Idiots!!" (さすらいの豆腐を打ち敗れ3バカ!!, Sasurai no Tōfu wo Uchiyabure 3 Baka!!); 217. "Kyoto Bazooka!!!!" (京都バズーカ!!!!, Kyōto Bazūka!!!!); 218. "Shigeki vs. Hajike" (シゲキ対ハジケ, Shigeki tai Hajike); 219. "Surprise Super Shigeki Show" (びっくりスーパー死劇ショー, Bikkuri Sūpā Shigeki Shō)
Continuing their Hair Kingdom battle, Bo-bobo and allies fight against a force including a female Babylon assassin while Beauty discovers why Softon always protected her. However, the final tower of combat turns out to be a massive tournament pitting Bo-bobo, Don Patch and Jelly Jiggler against the strongest in the kingdom in a variety of combat situations against the leader of the tofu forces, Gunkan's little brother and the enigmatic Shigeki X. Yet when everyone thinks its finally over, the true power of "Shigeki" brings the Hajike forces to near defeat.
21	Hajike Legend, Forever...!? Hajike Densetsu yo, Eien ni...!? (ハジケ伝説よ、永遠に...!?)	May 2, 2006; 4-08-874101-3	—
220. "Adult" (大人, Otona); 221. "Those Who Can't Become Adults Go In" (大人になれないヤツはおいていく, Otona ni Narenai Yatsu wa Oite Iku); 222. "It Starts Here" (始まりはここから, Hajimari wa Koko Kara); 223. "Opposite! The Fallen One" (対極! 堕ちた者, Taikoku! Ochitamono); 224. "The Heroic Hair Pin" (壮絶なるヘアー•ピン!!, Sōzetsunaru Heā•Pin!!); 225. "Endless Rain" (止めねえ雨, Yamenē Ame); 226. "Flash! We're Phoenixes!!" (閃光!!オレたちは不死鳥だ!!, Senkō!! Ore-tachi wa Fushichō da!!); 227. "Extra Dandy" (エクストラ•ダンデイ, Ekusutora•Dandei); 228. "Because Everyone is Already Here" (んもう♥みんながいたから。。。, Nmō♥Minna ga Ita Kara...); 229. "The Last Supper" (最後の晩餐, Saigo no Bansan); 230. "Hajike Legend, Forever...!?" (ハジケ伝説よ、永遠に。。。!?, Hajike Densetsu yo, Eien ni...!?)
As Jelly Jiggler has his final tofu showdown and an unexpected power finally puts a stop to Shigeki X, Bo-bobo's forces reach the final showdown with Bi-bibi, who reveals the truth about the siblings and the origin of the Hair Hunt. In a chaotic final battle, Bo-bobo and allies are forced to use everything they have to stop the insane brother until Bo-bobo gains the ultimate powers of the Hajikelist, allowing him to use ultimate nosehair and insanity to defeat Bi-bibi once and for all. With the Hair Kingdom crisis over, Bo-bobo's allies finally part ways, but know they must fight again soon as Tsurulina the III gains the ultimate power he desires.

=== Shinsetsu Bobobo-bo Bo-bobo ===
No.	Title	Release date	ISBN
1	New Hair; Shinke (新毛)	July 4, 2006	4-08-874129-3
01. "A New Hair" (新毛, Shimō); 02. "The Road Back from Hell" (黄泉がえり, Yomigaeri"; lit. "Resurrection); 03. "Heaven and Earth" (天と地と, Ten to Chi to); 04. "Let's Go to School!" (学校へ行こう!, Gakkō e Ikō!); 05. "In an Unlicked Life, Lick This!" (人生ナメずにこれナメて!, Jinsei Namezu ni Kore Namete!); 06. "Yo! Bobopatch-sensei" (押忍!ボボ八先生, Osu! Bobopachi-sensei); 07. "Gaoh's Memory" (ガ王’s MEMORY, Gaōzu Memorī); 08. "Service, Service This Week Too" (今週もサービスサービス, Konshū mo Sābisu Sābisu); 09. "Etiquette of the Heart" (心のエチケット, Kokoro no Echiketto); 10. "The Legendary SCOOP!!" (伝説のSCOOP!!, Densetsu no Sukūpu!!)
2	Bo-bobo vs. Gasser!! Bo-bobo vs. Kakusei Heppokomaru!! (ボーボボ VS. 覚醒ヘッポコ丸)	October 4, 2006	4-08-874263-X
11. "A Winning Team Eats Poop!!!" (勝ち組なんてクソ喰らえ!!!, Kachi-gumi nante Kuso Kurae!!!); 12. "Bread Counterattack!" (食パンの逆襲, Shokupan no Gyakushū); 13. "The Great Plan to Rescue Gasser!!" (ヘッポコ丸奪還大作戦!!, Heppokomaru Dakkan Dai Sakusen!!); 14. "OVER HEAT"; 15. "Bo-bobo vs. Gasser!!" (ボーボボVS覚醒ヘッポコ丸, Bo-bobo VS Kakusei Heppokomaru!!); 16. "Wicked King Gasser" (邪王ヘッポコ丸, Yokoshima-ō Heppokomaru); 17. "He's Here!! Shinsetsu BoboPatch!!" (出たぞ!!真説ボボパッチ, Deta zo!! Shinsetsu Bobopacchi); 18. "Bedtime!!" (おねんねの時間!!, O Nen'ne no Jikan!!); 19. "Namerō's Pride" (ナメ郎のプライド, Namerō no Puraido); 20. "Most Dangerous Combination ~The Most Dangerous Two~" (モストデンジャラスコンビ～最も危険な２人～, Mosuto Denjarasu Konbi ~Mottomo Kiken'na 2-ri~)
3	Must-See!! Angry Lightning Bee!!!! Hikken!! Doraibatchi!!!! (必見!!怒雷蜂!!!!)	January 4, 2007	978-4-08-874303-5
21. "Next Decisive Battle ~Nagoya Chance Meeting~" (次なる決戦～めぐりあい名古屋～, Tsuginaru Kessen ~Meguriai Nagoya~); 22. "SUPER Jelly Jiggler" (SUPER天の助, Sūpa Tennosuke); 23. "Shinsetsu Bo-bobo Corp. vs. The Nagoya Brothers" (真説ボーボボ軍団VS名古屋兄弟!!, Shinsetsu Bo-bobo Gundan VS Nagoya Kyōdai!!); 24. "Neo F-Block Commander" (真Ｆブロック隊長, Ma F-Burokku Taichō); 25. "You Serious!? Magical!? Pokomi's Extreme Force!!!" (マジかよ!?マジカル!?ポコミの超実力, Majikayo!? Majikaru!? Pokomi no Chō Jitsuryoku); 26. "Perfect Defense!! Shinsetsu Tenbobo" (完全防御!!真説天ボボ, Kanzen Bōgyo!! Shinsetsu Tenbobo); 27. "Pokomi's Decision" (ポコミの決意, Pokomi no Ketsui); 28. "Moved Elite Academy" (動きだしたエリートアカデミー, Ugokidashita Erīto Akademī); 29. "Enter the Academy Chromedome Big 4! Stormy 4 vs. 4!!!" (アカデミー四天王登場！嵐の４対４!!!, Akademī Shiten'nō Tōjō! Arashi no 4 tai 4!!!); 30. "Terrible Black Cyclone" (戦慄のＢ・Ｓ(ﾌﾞﾗｯｸ ｻｲｸﾛﾝ), Senritsu no B・S (Burakku Saikuron)); 31. "Must-See!! Angry Lightning Bee!!!!" (必見!!怒雷蜂!!!, Hikken!! Doraibachi!!!)
4	Fierce Fight! Heated Fight! The Great 23 Wards Playoff!! Gekitō! Netsutō! 23-Ku Daikessen!! (激闘! 熱闘! 23区大決戦!!)	April 4, 2007	978-4-08-874343-1
32. "Namerō's Secret" (ナメ郎の秘密, Namerō no Himitsu); 33. "Awakened Threat! Namerō the 5th!!" (目覚めし脅威！５世ナメ郎!!, Mezameshi Kyōi! 5-Sei Namerō!!); 34. "Stalemate!? Bo-bobo Team" (絶体絶命!?ボーボボ組, Zettaizetsumei!? Bo-bobo-gumi); 35. "Shinsetsu Bobobo-bo Bo-bobo, Start!!!!" (真説ボボボーボ・ボーボボ始動!!!!, Shinsetsu Bobobo-bo・Bo-bobo Shidō!!!!); 36. "Messenger from the Empire" (帝国からの使者, Teikoku Kara no Shisha); 37. "A Further "Extreme"!!!" (更なる〝極″!!!, Saranaru〝Goku″!!!); 38. "Outbreak of the Final War!!" (最終戦争開戦!!, Saishū Sensō Kaisen!!); 39. "With Love from Fukui!!!" (福井より愛をこめて!!!, Fukui Yori Ai o Komete!!!); 40. "Superior Class!! Hell Torpedo's Crash Course!!!" (超絶修行!!地獄の魚雷特訓!!!, Chōzetsu Shugyō!! Jigoku no Gyorai Tokkun!!!); 41. "Class's End! Ride the N-Train" (修行完了！Ｎ列車に乗って, Shugyō Kanryō! N Ressha ni Notte); 42. "Fierce Fight! Heated Fight! The Great 23 Wards Playoff!!" (激闘!熱闘!23区大決戦!!, Gekitō! Netsutō! 23-Ku Daikessen!!)
5	Super Warrior of Babylon • Softon; Babilon no Chōsenshi • Sofuton (バビロンの超戦士•ソフトン)	July 4, 2007	978-4-08-874385-1
43. "The Class' True Value" (修行の真価!, Syugyou no Shinka!); 44. "Gambling Explosion • Meet Princess Chinchiro!!" (賭博バクチク･チンチロ姫登場!!, Tobaku Bakutiku･ Tintirohime Tōzyō!!); 45. "Feelings of Vegas? Black Gambling Death Dice!!" (気分はベガス?闇賭博デスダイス!!, Kibun wa Begasu? Yami Tobaku Desu Daisu!!); 46. "Extreme Speed Rate!! The Soul-Worn Great Gamble!!!!" (超高レート?魂かけた大博打!!!!, Tyō kō Rate! Tamashii Kaketa dai Bakuti!!!!); 47. "First Time in Four Years♡ Bo-bobo World Also Excites the Author!" (4年ぶりだね♡作者もドキドキ聖鼻毛領域!, Yonen Buri Dane♡ Sakusya mo Dokidoki Bo-Bobo wa-rudo); 48. "Super Warrior of Babylon • Softon" (バビロンの超戦士･ソフトン, Babilon no Chōsenshi • Sofuton); 49. "Awakened Super Warrior" (目覚めた超戦士!!!, Mezameta Tyō Senshi!!!); 50. "Papapa-pa Pa-papatch" (パパパーパ·パーパパチ, Papapā-pa Pā-papachi); 51. "The Guidebooth to Hades" (黄泉への案内屋, Yomi e no Annai ya); 52. "A Unique Sangaria!!" (異色の3狩リア!!, Isyoku no Sangaria!!); 53. "Terrible Hell Trial" (恐怖の地獄裁判!!, Kyōhu no Jigoku Saiban!!)
6	Gasser the Strongest!! Saikyō Heppokomaru!! (最強ヘッポコ丸!!)	October 4, 2007	978-4-08-874427-8
54. "Rage!! The Hidden Truth!!" (暴け!!隠された真相!!, Abake!! Kakusareta Shinsō!!); 55. "Pokomi's Song☆" (ポコミの歌☆, Pokomi no Uta☆); 56. "Meet Shiryūen Kamara of the Three Great Kings!!" (三大王紫龍炎かまら登場!!, Sandaiō Shiryūen Kamara Tōjyō!!); 57. "Captured Sacrifice! The Deadly Doodlebug Spiral!!" (捕われた生け贄!死の螺旋アリジゴク!!, Torawareta Ikenie! Shi no Rasenarijigoku!!); 58. "Stop That Train!! Offense and Defense 5-on-5!!" (電車を止めろ!!5対5の攻防!!, Densha wo Tomero!! 5-tai-5 no Kōbō!!); 59. "Truly a Dragon Child" (実は竜の子だったの, Jitsu wa Ryū no Ko Datta no); 60. "A Lactic Bacilli Drink If a Man" (男なら乳酸菌飲料, Otoko Nara Nyūsankin Inryō); 61. "Gasser the Strongest!!" (最強ヘッポコ丸!!, Saikyō Heppokomaru!!); 62. "Icy Straight Man! Jati!!" (氷のツッコミ!邪テイ!!, Koori no Tsukkomi! Jati!!); 63. "Meet the Strongest Enemies of the 23 Wards!!" (23区最強の敵登場!!, 23-ku Saikyō no Teki Tōjyō!!); 64. "The End! The Strongest Hajikelists" (終結!最強ハジケリスト達, Shūketsu! Saikyō Hajikerisuto-tachi)
7	Sayonara Bobobo-bo Bo-bobo; Sayōnara Bobobō-bo Bō-bobo (さようならボボボーボ ボーボボ)	January 1, 2008	978-4-08-874467-4
65. "Legendary King Don Patch" (伝説の王首領パッチ!!, Densetsu no Ō Don Pacchi!!); 66. "Unbelievable Fusion!?" (まさかの融合!?, Masakano Yūgō!?); 67. "Shock! Hīragi's True Power!!" (驚愕！柊の実力!!, Kyōgaku! Hīragi no Jitsuryoku!!); 68. "Flaring Hajike Souls!! The Bonds of the Three" (燃え上がるハジケ魂!!３人の絆, Moeagaru Hajike Tamashī!! 3-Ri no Kizuna); 69. "Final Battle! Bo-bobo vs. Tsuru Tsurlina" (最終決戦！ボーボボVSツルリーナ, Saishū Kessen! Bo-bobo VS Tsururīna); 70. "Tsuru Tsurlina's Miscalculation" (ツルリーナの誤算, Tsururīna no Gosan); 71. "Arrived Power! Emperor Namerō!!" (継ぎし力！帝王ナメ郎!!, Tsugi Shi-ryoku! Teiō Namerō!!); 72. "Conclusion! The Denouement!!" (決着！大団円!!, Ketchaku! Daidan'en!!); 73. "Sayonara Bobobo-bo Bo-bobo" (さようならボボボーボ・ボーボボ, Sayōnara Bobobo-bo・Bo-bobo)
