= HinaBingo! =

Japanese variety show

- Season 1 poster
- Genre: Variety show
- Created by: Yasushi Akimoto
- Presented by: Kazutoyo Koyabu
- Starring: Hinatazaka46
- Country of origin: Japan
- Original language: Japanese
- No. of seasons: 2
- No. of episodes: 22

Production
- Producers: Shinobu Mōri, Hiroyuki Ueno
- Running time: 30 minutes
- Production company: Nippon TV

Original release
- Network: Nippon TV
- Release: April 16 – September 24, 2019

Related
- AKBingo!; NogiBingo!; KeyaBingo!; Hiragana Oshi; Hinatazaka de Aimashō

HinaBingo! is a Japanese late night variety show starring girl group Hinatazaka46. Hosted by the comedian Kazutoyo Koyabu, the show aired every Tuesday at 1:29 AM JST on Nippon TV.

== History ==
HinaBingo! was announced shortly after the group Hiragana Keyakizaka46 was rebranded to Hinatazaka46 in early 2019. It is the seventh installment of the "Bingo!" series produced by Nippon TV for the Sakamichi Series and AKB48 Group, following preceding shows such as AKBingo!, NogiBingo!, and KeyaBingo!. The first season premiered on April 16, 2019, and aired for 11 episodes until June 25, 2019.

A second season, titled HinaBingo! 2, began airing on July 16, 2019, shortly after the conclusion of the first season. It maintained the same host and format, running for another 11 episodes until its conclusion on September 24, 2019.

HinaBingo! featured a Hulu Japan exclusive spin-off segment called HinaRoom, where members chat in pajamas after the recording.

== Reception ==
The show was well-received for showcasing the members' growing capabilities in television variety. The host, Kazutoyo Koyabu, frequently praised the group for being "rich in variety skills" and commended their teamwork and dedication to comedic challenges, despite his deliberately strict hosting style. Media outlets noted the entertaining contrast between Koyabu's blunt Kansai-style comedy and the idols' earnest reactions; in particular, the unique comedic sense of the group's youngest member at the time, Hinano Kamimura, has been highlighted and praised by Koyabu during the show's run.

== Notable guests ==
- Yuri Yasui (安井友梨), bodybuilder (season 1, episode 4)

== Home media ==
The seasons were released on Blu-ray and DVD box sets.

Season	Title	Release date
1	HINABINGO! DVD & Blu-ray BOX (全力!日向坂46バラエティー HINABINGO! DVD & Blu-ray BOX)	November 22, 2019
2	HINABINGO! 2 DVD & Blu-ray BOX (全力!日向坂46バラエティー HINABINGO! 2 DVD & Blu-ray BOX)	April 3, 2020
