= Ijiri Okada =

- イジリー岡田
- Born: Noboru Okada; 23 September 1964 (age 61); Kita, Tokyo, Japan
- Education: Urawa Jitsugyo Gakuen Junior & Senior High School; Tōhō Gakuen College
- Occupations: Comedian, impressionist
- Years active: 1987–
- Agent: Horipro
- Known for: Monomane Grand Prix; Ameagari Kesshi-tai no Talk Bangumi Ame-talk!; AKBingo!; AKB48 Nemousu TV; Monomane Battle; Enta no Kamisama; Where is Nogizaka?; Shukan AKB; Nogizaka46 × HKT48: Kanmuri Bangumi Battle; NogiBingo!
- Height: 1.7 m (5 ft 7 in)

Ijiri Okada (イジリー岡田, Ijirī Okada; born 23 September 1964, in Kita, Tokyo, Japan), born Noboru Okada (岡田 昇, Okada Noboru) is a Japanese comedian, impressionist, and television host. His hosting credits include Gilgamesh LIGHT, a revival of the 90s show Gilgamesh Night, and the Nogizaka46 variety show NogiBingo!

Okada is represented by Horipro. He was married in 2016 in Hawaii.

== Filmography ==
=== TV series ===
==== Current appearances ====
| Year | Title | Network | Notes | Ref. |
|---|---|---|---|---|
| | AKBingo! | NTV | Irregular appearances | |
| | Monomane Grand Prix | NTV | | |
| | Downtown no Gaki no Tsukai ya Arahende!! | NTV | Irregular appearances | |
| | Ameagari Kesshi-tai no Talk Bangumi Ame-talk! | TV Asahi | | |
| | Pachi×Suro Omoshiro TV | Sun TV | | |
| 2011 | Akiba-kei Idol Channel | BS11 | | |
| 2013 | AKB48 Nemousu TV | Family Gekijo | Irregular appearances | |

==== Former appearances ====
| Year | Title | Network | Notes |
|---|---|---|---|
| | Enta no Kamisama | NTV | |
| | Lincoln | TBS | |
| | Yonaoshi Variety: Kangorongo | NHK TV | |
| | Shikatte! Blonde Sensei | TBS | |
| | Jichael Mackson | MBS | |
| | Monomane Battle | NTV | |
| | TV Champion | TV Tokyo | |
| 2009 | Takada Otake Watanabe no Oyaji Sannintabi Honki De Bijin Kanbanmusume o Sagase!! in Kusatsu | CTV | |
| | Momoiro Gakuentoshi Sengen!! | Fuji TV | |
| 2010 | Shukan AKB | TV Tokyo | Irregular appearances |
| 2012 | Gilgamesh Night | BS Japan | |
| 2013 | Nogizaka46 × HKT48: Kanmuri Bangumi Battle | NTV | |
| 2014 | Where is Nogizaka? | TV Tokyo | |
| 2014 | NogiBingo! | NTV | |

=== Films ===
| Year | Title | Role |
|---|---|---|
| 1998 | Tetsuwan Tantei Robotack & Kabutack: Fushiginokuni no Dai Bōken | Sazanka-san |
| 2006 | Zura Keiji | Deka-chin detective |
| 2006 | Nihon Igai Zenbu Chinbotsu | "Just Married" lawmaker |
| 2006 | Miss Machiko: Tōdai o Juken Dai Sakusen | Yamagata-sensei |
| 2009 | Kibōgaoka Fūfu Sensō | |
| 2009 | The Abashiri Family: The Movie | Abashiri Goemon |
| 2012 | Space Sheriff Gavan: The Movie | Iwamoto-shitsuchō |
| 2015 | All Esper Dayo! | Yoshiro's father |

=== Radio series ===
| Title | Network | Notes |
|---|---|---|
| God Afternoon: Akko no Iikagen 1000-kai | NBS | Responsible for relays |

=== TV dramas ===
| Year | Title | Role | Network | Notes |
|---|---|---|---|---|
| 1998 | Tetsuwan Tantei Robotack | Sazanka-san | TV Asahi | |
| 2007 | Akiko Wada Satsujin Jiken | Director | TBS | |
| 2007 | Shinjuku Swan | | TV Asahi | Episode 3 |
| 2009 | Chidejika Kazoku | Shuhei Oyanagi | Fuji TV | |
| 2010 | Jōō | | TV Tokyo | Episode 4 |
| 2013 | All Esper Dayo! | Yoshiro's father | TV Tokyo | |
| 2014 | Garo: Makai no Hana | Ozaki | TV Tokyo | Episode 11 |
| 2016 | Dame na Watashi ni Koishite Kudasai | | TBS | Episode 1 |

=== Anime ===
| Year | Title | Role | Network | Notes |
|---|---|---|---|---|
| 2003 | Kochira Katsushika-ku Kameari Kōen-mae Hashutsujo | | Fuji TV | Episodes 332 and 361 |
| 2009 | Astro Fighter Sunred | Mukiebi | TVK | |

=== Music videos ===
| Year | Title |
|---|---|
| 2015 | Bed In "C-Shirabe Bi~nasu!" |
