= Tetsuwan Tantei Robotack =

- Genre: Tokusatsu; Superhero fiction Sci-fi comedy
- Created by: Saburō Yatsude
- Developed by: Takashi Yamada
- Directed by: Katsuya Watanabe
- Starring: Etsuya Murakami
- Voices of: Nozomu Sasaki
- Opening theme: "Naseba Naruhodo Robotack" by Hironobu Kageyama
- Ending theme: "Robotack Ekakiuta" by Nozomu Sasaki
- Country of origin: Japan
- No. of episodes: 45

Production
- Running time: 25 minutes
- Production companies: Toei Company; Asatsu-DK

Original release
- Network: TV Asahi (ANN)
- Release: March 8, 1998 – January 24, 1999

Related
- B-Robo Kabutack; Moero!! Robocon

Tetsuwan Tantei Robotack (テツワン探偵ロボタック, Tetsuwan Tantei Robotakku) is a Japanese Tokusatsu television series created and produced by Toei Company. The series is the 17th installment of the Metal Hero Series franchise and the partial sequel to B-Robo Kabutack, and the last entry in the Heisei period. It premiered on March 8, 1998, the week following the finale of B-Robo Kabutack and ended on January 24, 1999. It joined Seijuu Sentai Gingaman as part of the block that would ultimately become Super Hero Time in 2003. Like its predecessor, it bears some similarities with Moero!! Robocon in characters and themes styles.

== Plot ==
The story begins when the Ruling Elder of Harappa Land sent a few of his robotic people to seek out the sacred treasure of their kingdom: The Landtool. Two such robots, Robotack and Kamerock, arrived to a place called Yumegaoka. It was there that Robotack befriended a boy named Kakeru and aided the boy's uncle, Kaoru Sugi, in his Private Investigation business. But also on the quest for the LandTool is DarkCrow and his lacky Kabados, who were exiled and intend to make money off the LandTool.

== Characters ==
- Robotack (ロボタック, Robotakku): Red Wonder dog-type robot with a dog-type biochip. He came to seek out the Land Tool after arriving in Japan. He also stole Sugi's meal while on the verge of starvation and is soon drafted into the Shardock P.D. Agency in compensation for Sugi's meal. His favorite food is a sausage and ends his sentences with "Bow." Robotack needs Kakeru play the Wonder Flute, as that is what make him performs the Magnet Change and transforms into Special Mode from Normal Mode, but he could later transform by himself afterwards. Super Mode's weapon is the RK Bar (ＲＫバー, Āru Kei Bā). His motif is based on the legend of Hanasaka Jiisan and his name is based on Lobo. He can replace his arms with Mog-Lucky's and add Takkard's wings to become Robotack Drill-Wing Special (ロボタック・ドリルウイングスペシャル, Robotakku Doriru-Uingu Supesharu).
- Kakeru Yukiyanagi (雪柳 カケル, Yukiyanagi Kakeru): Robotack's first human friend and the leader of the YST. He plays the Wonder Flute and supports Robotack. Because his parents reside in London, but they moved in to Japan.
- Kamerock (カメロック, Kamerokku): Blue Wonder turtle-type robot with a turtle-type biochip. He came to Japan from China following Robotack. He lives in the apartment near the Shardock P.D. Agency. He is troubled by Mimeena's courting. His Super Mode weapon is the Kamerazooka (カメラズーカ, Kamerazūka). His motif is based on the legend of Urashima Tarō. He can replace his arms with Darkrow's left arm and Kabados' right arm to become Kamerock Masakari Slicer Special (カメロック・マサカリスライサースペシャル, Kamerokku Masakari Suraisā Supesharu).
- Darkrow (ダークロー, Dākurō): Black Wonder crow-type robot with a crow-type biochip. The deputy branch manager of Gold Platinum's Yumagaoka Branch. Since he broke the Elder's precious vase, he was exiled from Harappa. He has rivalry with Kamerock. Although he is a crow-type robot, he has a fear of heights. He ends his sentences with "Dacchūno" or "Dacchūni." Special Mode's weapon is the KaraSlicer (カラスライサー, Karasuraisā). His motif is based on the folklore about a crow.
- Kabados (カバドス, Kabadosu): Orange Wonder hippopotamus-type robot with a hippopotamus-type biochip. Darkrow's follower and was too exiled from Harappa. He ends his sentences with "Dosu." Special Mode's weapon is the Masakarihawk (マサカリホーク, Masakarihōku) ax. His motif is based on the legend of Kintarō.
- Mimeena (ミミーナ, Mimīna): Wonder bunny-type robot with a rabbit-type biochip. She is the Wonder-type robot, but does not have the Magnet Change function. She supplies robots with the repair services. She has fallen in love with Kamerock. She ends her sentences with "Pyon." Her motif is based on the legend of The Tortoise and the Hare.
- Mog-Lucky (モグラッキー, Mogurakkī): Green Wonder mole-type robot with a mole-type biochip. He is working under Karamatsu for the Yumegaoka police. He had worked for the Prefecture of Police in Paris, adapting a French accent as a result. Since he is mainly an underground working-type robot, his sensor causes a system error to an intense light. Super Mode's weapon is the Lucky Drill (ラッキードリル, Rakkī Doriru). His name is based on "Lucky" of slang.
- Torabolt (トラボルト, Toraboruto): Yellow Wonder tiger-type robot with a tiger-type biochip who is the president of Gold Platinum. He is the prototype robot created by Dr. Takamine and is Robotack's elder brother robot. He has known that Robotack was his younger brother robot for some time. The creation of the tiger-type biochip by Dr. Takamine did not go smoothly, and so he had a cat-type biochip instead, but it was exchanged for the tiger-type biochip by Dr. Takamine in the finale. He is indignant to Dr. Takamine and plots the fall of Harappa. He is a Hanshin Tigers fan. He ends his sentences with "Nya." His Special Mode's weapon is the Inazun-Bar (イナズンバー, Inazunbā). His motif is based on a tiger and a tabby cat and his name may be based on John Travolta.
- Takkard (タッカード, Takkādo): Blue and White Wonder hawk-type robot with a hawk-type biochip. He had studied to become a teacher without knowledge of the Land Tool missing. He teaches Kakeru and his friends at the Yumegaoka Elementary School. In the Special Mode, Takkard flies at 800 km/h, using the Hawk Shield (ホークシールド, Hōku Shīrudo) to protect himself. His motif is unknown.
- Speedam/Speedy Wonder (スピーダム／スピーディーワンダー, Supīdamu/Supīdī Wandā): Red Wonder dog-type robot with a dog-type biochip. He is the latest model scientist robot of Harappa who is a candidate in the next senior, and he is the designer of Mightburn. Whenever he and Mightburn eat a fully ripened red Wonder Seed, they execute Reversal Combine (逆転合体, Gyakuten Gattai) into the fastest hero Speedy Wonder. He knew that Robotack and Torabolt are brothers. He ends his sentences with "Wan"(Bow-Wow). Speedy Wonder's weapon is Speedy Cannons (スピーディーキャノン, Supīdī Kyanon). His motif is "dog and monkey"
- Mightburn/Mighty Wonder (マイトバーン／マイティーワンダー, Maitobān/Maitī Wandā): Purple Wonder monkey-type robot with a monkey-type biochip who was created by Speedam, although he is evil. Whenever he and Speedam eat an unripened green Wonder Seed or a crushed, fully ripened Wonder Seed, or a dead Wonder Seed, they "Reversal Combine" into the strongest evil robot Mighty Wonder. He became a good robot by the shock of crashing into a temple bell. His favorite food is bananas. He ends his sentences with "Kī"(Monkey noise). Mighty Wonder's weapon is Mighty Cannons (マイティーキャノン, Maitī Kyanon). His motif is "dog and monkey".
- Kaoru Sugi (杉 薫, Sugi Kaoru): The president of Shardock P.D. Agency; he is a detective, Kakeru's uncle, and Kakeru's mother's younger brother. Forcing a request upon Kakeru and Robotack, he is working at a part-time job while bent on catching Cherry to get the 5,000 reward. He closed down the Shardock P.D. Agency and left Yumegaoka for London in the finale.
- Kōta Umeda (梅田 コータ, Umeda Kōta): Kakeru's classmate and a mood maker of the YST.
- Shigeru Sakaki (榊 シゲル, Sakaki Shigeru): Kakeru's classmate and a member of the YST. He had a trauma due to Chinese dumplings.
- Misaki Tachibana (橘 ミサキ, Tachibana Misaki): Kakeru's classmate and a member of the YST, though technically the only female member.

=== Citizens ===
- Detective Karamatsu (唐松刑事, Karamatsu Keiji): The detective who was Sugi's senpai and bent on bringing Cherry to justice. He can give off an intense light from his shaven head. He took advantage of Mog-Lucky's weakness, having him transferred to the Yumegaoka Police forcibly as his assistant. His favorite food is a takoyaki.
- Saburo Sazanka (山茶花 三郎, Sazanka Saburō): A poor middle-aged man who lives in the apartment. The wall of his room is sometimes broken through by robots. His favorite foods are instant noodles.
- Sakurako Takamine/Phantom Thief Cherry (高峯 桜子／怪盗チェリー, Takamine Sakurako/Kaitō Cherī): The executive of Gold Platinum's head office who employed Darkrow and Kabados. Assuming the guise of Phantom Thief Cherry, she steals to save a church and a child care institution. She's a master of disguise and armed with a whip. During an attempt to steal a painting, she is nearly caught by Robotack and Kamerock before escaping them after she puts them on right trail to the 5th Shyubido Badge.

=== Others ===
- Dr. Yuichiro Takamine (高峯 裕一郎, Takamine Yūichirō): The doctor of engineering who is a designer of Robotack and other robots, and Sakurako's father.
- Elder (長老, Chōrō): A dog-type robot. He is governing Harappa.
- Master Ranking (マスターランキング, Masutā Rankingu): An elephant and a whale robot who appears when a Badge is found. He judges the game for CongraTrophies, his carrier unit changes into the Ranking Arena. While he gives the CondraTrophy to the winner, he executes a failure game to the losing player. His motif is based on Hindu mythology.
- Baby Elephant Robots (子象ロボット, Kozō Robotto): They are four baby elephant-type robots that assist Master Ranking.
  - Preparing Elephant (準備するゾウ, Junbi Suru Zō): He prepares the contests within the Ranking Arena. While Master Ranking was self-training, he worked as an assistant director of a TV station.
  - Watching Elephant (監視するゾウ, Kanshi Suru Zō): He watches players. While Master Ranking was self-training, he worked as a pool watcher.
  - Interfering Elephant (邪魔するゾウ, Jama Suru Zō): He interferes players. While Master Ranking was self-training, he worked as a bodyguard of idol's on the recommendation of Reflecting Elephant.
  - Reflecting Elephant (反省するゾウ, Hansei Suru Zō): He administers punishment to players. While Master Ranking was self-training, he served as a father of a church.

== Setting ==
=== Shardock P.D. Agency ===
The Shardock P.D. Agency (シャードック探偵事務所, Shādokku Tantei Jumusho)

=== Harappa Land ===
The robots who like Robotack and the others come from Harappa Land (ハラッパ国, Harappa Koku) and live like humans.

=== Yumegaoka Elementary School ===
The Yumegaoka Elementary School (夢が丘小学校, Yumegaoka Shōgakkō)

=== Yumegaoka Police ===
The Yumegaoka Police (夢が丘警察, Yumegaoka Keisatsu)

=== Gold Platinum P.D. Agency ===
The Gold Platinum P.D. Agency (ゴールドプラチナ社, Gōrudo Purachina Sha)

== Tool ==
- Wonder Flute (ワンダフルート, Wanda Furūto): A bone-like flute which transforms Robotack into Super Mode or recharges Robotack's battery. The elite robots of Harappa kingdom can transform into Special Mode (スペシャルモード, Supesharu Mōdo) from Normal Mode (ノーマルモード, Nōmaru Mōdo) by the Magnet Change (ジシャックチェンジ, Jishakku Chenji). They are based on legends or myths, with some ending their sentences with onomatopoeic sound representations of the animals they are modeled after.
- Glasses Muzzle (メガネハナ, Meganehana): The glasses which raise up thinking power and the sense of smell.
- Power Arm (パワーアーム, Pawā Āmu): The arm part which strengthens up arm strength.
- Land Battery (ランドバッテリー, Rando Batterī): The countermeasures to Torabolt's Land Tool.
- Wonder Phone (ワンダホン, Wanda Hon): A multi-cellphone. It can also release the Reversal Gattai forcibly.
- Wonder Seed (ワンダーシード, Wandā Shīdo): The seed for the Reversal Gattai. It grows or dies according to singing ability. The robot which combined by the Reversal Gattai obeys the person who gave the Wonder Seed.
- Land Tool (ランドツール, Rando Tsūru): When all five Land Tools are collected, it changes into the armor for the robot. The golden Land Tool is the most important item.

== Episodes ==
1. Dog on a Walk, the Wandering Detective (犬も歩けば迷探偵, Inu mo Arukeba Meitantei): written by Takashi Yamada, directed by Katsuya Watanabe
2. The Aiding Turtle's Requital (助けた亀の恩返し, Tasuketa Kame no Ongaeshi): written by Takashi Yamada, directed by Katsuya Watanabe
3. Astray!! The Giant Game (迷走！！ 巨大すごろく, Meisō!! Kyodai Sugoroku): written by Junichi Miyashita, directed by Naoki Iwahara
4. Advance!! The Detective Boys (進め！！ 少年探偵団, Susume!! Shōnen Tanteidan): written by Satoru Nishizono, directed by Naoki Iwahara
5. Cherry the Phantom Thief's Present (怪盗チェリー現る！！, Kaitō Cherī Arawaru!!): written by Takashi Yamada, directed by Hidenori Ishida
6. The Missing of First Love Investigation (行方不明の初恋捜し, Yukuefumei no Hatsukoi Sagashi): written by Takashi Yamada, directed by Hidenori Ishida
7. The Whistle call, the Dog's Busy (笛に呼ばれて犬忙し, Fue ni Yobarete Inu Isogashi): written by Satoru Nishizono, directed by Taro Sakamoto
8. The Dog's Earnestness Overcomes All Obstacles (犬の一念岩をも砕く, Inu no Ichinen Iwa omo Kudaku): written by Nobuo Ogizawa, directed by Taro Sakamoto
9. The Fateful Showdown: The Crow vs. The Turtle (因縁対決カラスＶＳ亀, Innen Taiketsu Karasu Buiesu Kame): written by Takashi Yamada, directed by Katsuya Watanabe
10. The Elderly Detective Guts (おじさん探偵ド根性, Ojisan Tantei Dokonjō): written by Junichi Miyashita, directed by Katsuya Watanabe
11. The Immortal Man has a Bald Head (不死身の男はハゲ頭？, Fujimi no Otoko wa Hage Atama?): written by Satoru Nishizono, directed by Naoki Iwahara
12. The Justice of the Disconnected Crow (正義のはぐれカラス, Seigi no Hagure Karasu): written by Toshinobu Oi, directed by Katsuya Watanabe
13. Sazanka-san's Worst Day Ever (山茶花さん最悪の日, Sazanka-san Saiaku no Hi): written by Takashi Yamada, directed by Hidenori Ishida
14. Lovely Gyoza of Sympathy (恋する餃子の涙, Koisuru Gyōza no Namida): written by Yoshio Urasawa, directed by Hidenori Ishida
15. My Rival's a Genius Detective (ライバルは天才探偵, Raibaru wa Tensai Tantei): written by Nobuo Ogizawa, directed by Taro Sakamoto
16. Bonjour, Dēsu (ボンジュールでーす, Bonjūru Dēsu): written by Takashi Yamada, directed by Taro Sakamoto
17. The Mole Cop's Cheers (モグラ刑事に乾杯！, Mogura Keiji ni Kanpai): written by Satoru Nishizono, directed by Katsuya Watanabe
18. The Black Demon's Hazardous Trap (黒い悪魔の危険な罠, Kuroi Akuma no Kiken na Wana): written by Junichi Miyashita, directed by Katsuya Watanabe
19. The Rabbit's Great Passionate Plan (ウサギの恋愛大作戦, Usagi no Renai Daidakusen): written by Yoshio Urasawa, directed by Naoki Iwahara
20. The Explosive Fierce Tiger!! Chief Tora (猛虎爆発！ トラ会長, Mōko Bakuhatsu! Tora Kaichō): written by Takeshi Yamada, directed by Naoki Iwahara
21. Rapid Development! The New Resolve (急展開！ 新たな決意, Kyūtenkai! Aratana Ketsui): written by Takashi Yamada, directed by Taro Sakamoto
22. The Disturbing Banzai (邪魔してバンザイ！, Jama Shite Banzai): written by Satoru Nishizono, directed by Taro Sakamoto
23. The Pretty Girl Spirit's Secret (美少女幽霊の秘密, Bishōjo Yūrei no Himitsu): written by Yoshio Urasawa, directed by Katsuya Watanabe
24. The Hot-Blooded Robot Teacher's Youth (熱血ロボ先生の青春, Nekketsu Robo Sensei no Seishun): written by Nobuo Ogizawa, directed by Katsuya Watanabe
25. Cherry the Phantom Thief Dies?! (怪盗チェリー死す！？, Kaitō Cherī Shisu!?): written by Junichi Miyashita, directed by Naoki Iwahara
26. The Hawk Teacher's Firey New School Term (タカ先生炎の新学期, Taka Sensei Honō no Shingakki): written by Takashi Yamada, directed by Naoki Iwahara
27. The Lovely Assistant Chef (愛の助っ人料理人, Ai no Suketto Ryōrinin): written by Satoru Nishizono, directed by Hidenori Ishida
28. The Stormy Center of the Final Trial (嵐の中の最終試練, Arashi no Naka no Saishū Shiren): written by Takashi Yamada, directed by Hidenori Ishida
29. The Search for the Hungry Detective (腹ペコ探偵を捜せ, Harapeko Tantei o Sagase): written by Junichi Miyashita, directed by Hidenori Ishida
30. The Rejected Man's turning of the Tables (フラレ男の一発逆転, Furare Otoko no Ippatsugyakuten): written by Toshinobu Oi, directed by Taro Sakamoto
31. The Almighty Phone, Wonder Phone (万能電話ワンダホン, Bannō Denwa Wanda Hon): written by Nobuo Ogizawa, directed by Taro Sakamoto
32. The Combined Robots' Monkey and Dog Relationship (合体ロボは犬猿の仲, Gattai Robo wa Kenen no Naka): written by Takashi Yamada, directed by Katsuya Watanabe
33. Catching a Shooting Star (流れ星を受け止めろ, Nagareboshi o Uketomero): written by Takashi Yamada, directed by Katsuya Watanabe
34. Explode the Bridge of a Trial (試練の橋を爆破せよ, Shiren no Hashi o Bakuha seyo): written by Satoru Nishizono, directed by Hidenori Ishida
35. The Strongest Combined Robot's Weakness (最強合体ロボの弱点, Saikyō Gattai Robo no Jakuten): written by Junichi Miyashita, directed by Hidenori Ishida
36. The Disappeared Masked Wrestler (消えた覆面レスラー, Kieta Fukumen Resurā): written by Satoru Nishizono, directed by Taro Sakamoto
37. Valuable friendship, Dēsu! (友情は大切デース！, Yūjō wa Taisetsu Dēsu!): written by Yoshio Urasawa, directed by Taro Sakamoto
38. Cherry's Hollow Challenge (チェリーからの挑戦, Cherī kara no Chōsen): written by Takashi Yamada, directed by Katsuya Watanabe
39. The First Snow, The Monkey Robot's First Love (初雪に猿ロボの初恋, Hatsuyuki ni Saru Robo Hatsukoi): written by Junichi Miyashita, directed by Katsuya Watanabe
40. Santa Superority (サンタをくすぐれ！, Santa o Kusugure!): written by Satoru Nishizono, directed by Naoki Iwahara
41. The New Year's Bell is Hated (除夜の鐘は大嫌い！, Joya no Kane wa Daikirai!): written by Yoshio Urasawa, directed by Naoki Iwahara
42. Troubled K's New Year (悩めるＫのお正月, Nayameru Kei no Oshōgatsu): written by Nobuo Ogizawa, directed by Naoki Iwahara
43. Memories are the Greatest Treasure (思い出は最高の宝物, Omoide wa Saikō no Takaramono): written by Junichi Miyashita, directed by Hidenori Ishida
44. The Dog and the Cat! The Fate of Brothers (犬と猫！ 運命の兄弟, Inu to Neko! Unmei no Kyōdai): written by Takashi Yamada, directed by Hidenori Ishida
45. Robotack's Death at Sea (ロボタック海に死す, Robotakku Umi ni Shisu): written by Takashi Yamada, directed by Hidenori Ishida

== Special ==
Tetsuwan Tantei Robotack and Kabutack: The Great Strange Country Adventure (テツワン探偵ロボタック&カブタック 不思議の国の大冒険, Tetsuwan Tantei Robotakku to Kabutakku: Fushigi no Kuni no Daibōken) is a special crossover that places the cast of Robotack and Kabutack in the fictional country of Tetsuwan (テツワン大陸) in Wonder World (ワンダー星).

Chasing a thief who stole his Daifuku across Tetsuwan before cornering him at the Tansan Kingdom, Robotack is arrested by a pair of Baby Elephant Robo guards. Brought before the king and queen of Tansan, Robotack is given the task to find their daughter Princess Lamune. Learning that a rhinoceros-beetle-like robot kidnapped Lamune, and finding a crow's feather at the scene, Robotack goes to a stand run by Mimeena who informs him that two robots mentioned seeing the kidnapper at the Desert Town. Heading into the desert, Robotack finds the kidnapper: Kabutack. The two robots proceed to comedically fight each other before assuming their fighting forms and getting serious. But after the two knock each other out, Kabutack sees the crow feather and shows Robotack one he found while getting into a scuffle with the retainers of the dictator Torabolt over a magical shield he found. With this new info, Robotack realizes that Darkrow posed as Kabutack and kidnapped the princess.

Though Kabutack remains to continue his search for the magical sword that can counteract the shield, he has assistant Kamerock accompany Robotack to Ohedo Town where they find Lamune and her two kidnappers. As Kamerock deals with Darkrow and Kabados, Robotack saves the princess and gets her to safety while learning her abduction was orchestrated by Torabolt. At that time, Torabolt arrives and uses the shield to blast Robotack into the river as he spirits the princess away to marry her. After an amnesic misadventure involving Takard and Moglucky, Robotack is joined by the young samurai Kakeru. Sneaking into the Union of Toruboruto with the help of a padre to stop the wedding, Robotack and his friends are at a disadvantage until Kabutack arrives with the magical sword. With Kamerock taking the princess to safety, Robotack and Kabutack defeat Darkrow and Kabados. However, the two are overpowered by the summoned Mighty Wonder before they destroy both him and the shield. Robotack then sends Toraboruto flying towards his castle, causing it to explode. When he then admits his feelings for her, Robotack is shot down as Lamune tells him that her heart belongs to the knight to treated her with kindness while in Torabolt's dungeon. Robotack freaks out further when the knight turns out to be the thief, Saburo Sazanki. After the wedding, Robotack eventually lightens up and joins in the party.

- Script: Yoshio Urasawa
- Director: Naoki Iwahara

== Cast ==
- Kakeru Yukiyanagi - Etsuya Murakami (村上 悦也, Murakami Etsuya)
- Misaki Tachibana - Mei Kurokawa (黒川 芽以, Kurokawa Mei)
- Kaoru Sugi - Hiroo Ōtaka (大高 洋夫, Ōtaka Hiroo)
- Shigeru Sakaki - Yū Yoshida (吉田 由, Yoshida Yū)
- Kōta Umeda - Yousuke Okano (岡野 洋祐, Okano Yōsuke)
- Detective Karamatsu - Shoichiro Akaboshi (赤星 昇一郎, Akaboshi Shōichirō)
- Sakurako Takamine - Hitoe Ōtake (大竹 一重, Ōtake Hitoe)
- Saburo Sazanka - Ijiri Okada (イジリー 岡田, Ijirī Okada)
- Dr. Yuichiro Takamine - Yū Numazaki (沼崎 悠, Numazaki Yū)

=== Voice cast ===
- Robotack - Nozomu Sasaki (佐々木 望, Sasaki Nozomu)
- Kamerock - Hideyuki Hori (堀 秀行, Hori Hideyuki)
- Mimeena - Yū Asakawa (浅川 悠, Asakawa Yū)
- Darkrow - Hiroyuki Shibamoto (柴本 浩行, Shibamoto Hiroyuki)
- Kabados - Takehiro Murozono (室園 丈裕, Murozono Takehiro)
- Mog-Lucky - Yūko Mita (三田 ゆう子, Mita Yūko)
- Takkard - Toshio Furukawa (古川 登志夫, Furukawa Toshio)
- Torabolt - Kappei Yamaguchi (山口 勝平, Yamaguchi Kappei)
- Speedam/Speedy Wonder - Ryo Horikawa (堀川 亮, Horikawa Ryō)
- Mightburn/Mighty Wonder - Naoki Tatsuta (龍田 直樹, Tatsuta Naoki)
- Baby Elephant Robots - Hiromi Nishikawa (西川 宏美, Nishikawa Hiromi)
- Master Ranking - Tamio Ōki (大木 民夫, Ōki Tamio)
- Elder - Yutaka Ōyama (大山 豊, Ōyama Yutaka)

== Songs ==
Opening theme

- "Naseba Naruhodo Robotack" (なせばなるほどロボタック, Naseba Naruhodo Robotakku; "If it Forms, it Becomes Robotack")
  - Lyrics: Tamanosuke Ōga (大賀 玉之輔, Ōga Tamanosuke)
  - Composition & Arrangement: Keiju Ishikawa (石川 恵樹, Ishikawa Keiju)
  - Artist: Hironobu Kageyama (影山 ヒロノブ, Kageyama Hironobu)

Ending themes

- "Robotack Ekakiuta" (ロボタック絵かき歌, Robotakku Ekakiuta; "The Robotack Drawing Song")
  - Lyrics: Tamanosuke Ōga with Kēsuke & Yūgi & Moe (大賀 玉之輔 with ケースケ & ユーギ & モエ, Ōga Tamanosuke wizu Kēsuke ando Yūgi ando Moe)
  - Composition: Natsuko Ōtani (大谷 奈津子, Ōtani Natsuko)
  - Arrangement: Youichi Yamazaki (山崎 洋一, Yamazaki Yōichi)
  - Artist: Nozomu Sasaki (佐々木 望, Sasaki Nozomu)
  - Episodes: 1-31
- "Ii ja nai" (いいじゃない; "Come On!")
  - Lyrics: Tamanosuke Ōga
  - Composition & Arrangement: Hideki Fujisawa (藤沢 秀樹, Fujisawa Hideki)
  - Artist: Robotack All Stars
  - Episodes: 32-45
- "Meitantei Wa Kangaechuu" (名探偵は考え中; "Meitantei Wa Kangaechū")
  - Lyrics: Saburo Yatsude (八手 三郎; Yatsude Saburoū)
  - Composition & Arrangement: Katsuki Maeda (前田 克樹, Maeda Katsuki)
  - Artist: Nozomu Sasaki (佐々木 望, Sasaki Nozomu)

== International Broadcasts and Home Video ==
- In Indonesia, it aired on RCTI with an Indonesian dub in 2005.
- In South Korea, the series aired with a Korean dub on JEI TV in 2007.
