= Hiromi Nishikawa =

Japanese voice actress (born 1972)

- Born: December 29, 1972 (age 53)
- Occupation: actress

Hiromi Nishikawa (西川 宏美, Nishikawa Hiromi; born December 29, 1972 in Tokyo) is a Japanese voice actress affiliated with Aoni Production.

She has voiced various anime characters, including Torpedo Girl of Bobobo-bo Bo-bobo.

== Notable voice roles ==
- Angelic Layer (Yuuko Inada)
- Blue Gender (Minh)
- Bobobo-bo Bo-bobo (Torpedo Girl)
- Crayon Shin-chan: Arashi wo Yobu Eikou no Yakiniku Road (Shitada's wife)
- Slam Dunk (Matsui)
- One Piece (Moodie, Poppy, Cosmos)

=== Tokusatsu roles ===
- Tetsuwan Tantei Robotack (1998) (Baby Elephant Robots)
- Kamen Rider Agito (2001) (Queen Jaguar Lord / Pantheras Magistra) (ep 20–21)
- Hyakujuu Sentai Gaoranger (2001-2002) (Highness Duke Org Rasetsu (Woman Voice)) (ep. 32–49)
- Ninpuu Sentai Hurricanger (2002) (Perfume Ninja Kira-Cologne) (ep. 23)
