= AKB48 Sayonara Mōri-san =

Japanese variety show

Japanese name
- Kanji: AKB48 サヨナラ毛利さん
- Literal meaning: AKB48 Goodbye, Mr. Mouri
- Genre: Variety show
- Created by: Yasushi Akimoto
- Presented by: Shimofuri Myojo
- Starring: AKB48; Minami Minegishi
- Country of origin: Japan
- Original language: Japanese
- No. of episodes: 48

Production
- Running time: 24 minutes
- Production company: Nippon Television

Original release
- Network: Nippon Television
- Release: April 8, 2022 – March 23, 2023

Related
- AKBingo!

AKB48 Sayonara Mōri-san (AKB48 サヨナラ毛利さん; transl. AKB48 Goodbye, Mr. Mouri) is a Japanese variety show starring Japanese idol girl group AKB48, airing weekly on Nippon TV from April 8, 2022 to March 23, 2023. It is hosted by the comedy duo Shimofuri Myojo and also features former AKB48 member Minami Minegishi as a regular. It is the spiritual successor to AKBingo!, which ran on the same network from 2008 to 2019.

== History ==
In March 2022, it was announced that a new AKB48 variety show would start airing in April, two and a half years after the cancellation of AKBingo! The show was titled in honor of producer Shinobu Mōri, who had produced the Bingo! series and other idol variety shows for 13 years. It would be staffed by a new production team in order to "update the show for the Reiwa era"; director Fumihiko Nakamura stated that the key point was "how much they can show something new without betraying the universal image of idols". Minami Minegishi, former AKB48 member and AKBingo! regular cast, would also appear as a regular in the show to "help out".

The show's launch was commemorated with the "AKBingo! The Final Sayonara Mōri-san" concert at the Pia Arena MM in Yokohama on April 3. The event also included a farewell ceremony for Miho Miyazaki, Rena Kato, and Anna Iriyama, who had recently left or were about to leave AKB48, and was also to celebrate the eighth anniversary of AKB48 Team 8. In addition, the members participated in a series of games and talent shows to appeal to become the show's "center"; Maho Ōmori won the position by audience vote.

== Reception ==
Idol journalist Yutaka Sato praised the "good chemistry" between Shimofuri Myojo and the group members on the first few episodes, and commented that the show would please long-time fans, particularly noting the embarrassing revelations about the members in episode 2 which were reminiscent of the old AKB48 variety shows.
