= KeyaBingo! =

Japanese variety show

- Also known as: KEYABINGO!
- Genre: Variety show
- Created by: Yasushi Akimoto
- Starring: Keyakizaka46; Sandwichman
- Country of origin: Japan
- Original language: Japanese
- No. of seasons: 4
- No. of episodes: 46

Production
- Running time: 30 minutes
- Production companies: KEYABINGO! Production Committee; NTV; Acro

Original release
- Network: NTV
- Release: July 5, 2016 – June 26, 2018

Related
- AKBingo! NogiBingo! HinaBingo!

KeyaBingo! (stylized as KEYABINGO!) is a Japanese television variety show starring Japanese idol group Keyakizaka46 and Hiragana Keyakizaka46 (now Hinatazaka46). The show ran for four seasons and hosted by the comedy duo Sandwichman. It premiered on July 5, 2016, on NTV and streamed on Hulu Japan. The second season began on January 11, 2017.

== Notable guests ==
- Ryo Mizunami, pro wrestler, season 4, episodes 1 and 9

== DVD and Blu-ray releases ==
| Season | Episodes | DVD and Blu-ray release dates |
| Season | Episodes | Region 2 |
|---|---|---|
| Season 1 | 12 | January 27, 2017 |
| Season 2 | 12 | December 22, 2017 |
| Season 3 | 11 | June 29, 2018 |
| Season 4 | 11 | November 9, 2018 |
