= NogiBingo! =

- Also known as: NOGIBINGO!
- Genre: Variety show
- Created by: Yasushi Akimoto
- Starring: Nogizaka46; Ijiri Okada
- Opening theme: Girls' Rule (season 1); Nandome no Aozora ka? (season 3)
- Country of origin: Japan
- Original language: Japanese
- No. of series: 10
- No. of episodes: 117

Production
- Running time: 30 minutes
- Production companies: NTV; VAP; D.N. Dream Partners LLP (Note: Joint venture of NTV and NTT Docomo.); Acro

Original release
- Network: NTV
- Release: July 3, 2013 – December 18, 2018

Related
- AKBingo! KeyaBingo! HinaBingo!

NogiBingo!, stylized as NOGIBINGO!, is a Japanese television variety show starring Japanese idol girl group Nogizaka46. Ijiri Okada, who is known for AKB48-related shows such as AKB48 Nemōsu TV, hosts the program. The show first aired on July 3, 2013, as part of the variety show Nogizaka46 x HKT48 Kanbangumi Battle!, and it became an independent show starting with the second season.

The second season began on January 11, 2014, and the third season premiered on October 7, 2014. On October 9, 2014, Hulu Japan announced that some TV shows were made available for streaming including NOGIBINGO!3. In this season, Rena Matsui from SKE48 appeared. Hulu Japan also streamed the girls talk show called Nogi Room including the unaired part.

The fourth season premiered on April 7, 2015. In the first episode of this season, Zawachin, who is a Japanese tarento, and impressionist, appeared as a guest. The fifth season premiered on July 14, 2015, and the sixth season premiered on April 12, 2016. After the season 6 ended, the first season of KEYABINGO!, a variety show by Keyakizaka46, premiered in the same time slot.

The seventh season premiered on October 11, 2016. Daisuke Muramoto, one of the hosts of AKBINGO!, made a guest appearance in its second episode. The show's eighth season, which started on April 11, 2017, exclusively featured the twelve new third generation members, with members from the first and second generations joining in as guests. The show's ninth season began on October 17, and concluded on December 26, 2017.

On October 8, 2018, the final season premiered. After 117 episodes, the show ended this run on December 18, 2018.

== Home media ==
Season	Episodes	DVD and Blu-ray release dates
Season	Episodes	Region 2
Season 1	12	March 7, 2014 (DVD)
Season 1	12	March 12, 2021 (Blu-ray)
Season 2	12	September 12, 2014 (DVD)
Season 2	12	March 12, 2021 (Blu-ray)
Season 3	12	April 24, 2015
Season 4	12	October 16, 2015
Season 5	12	February 19, 2016
Season 6	12	September 30, 2016
Season 7	12	August 4, 2017
Season 8	11	March 16, 2018
Season 9	11	October 19, 2018
Season 10	11	October 25, 2019
