= List of Bobobo-bo Bo-bobo characters =

The universe of the manga and anime series Bobobo-bo Bo-bobo is a home to a wide array of fictional characters. This article will lay out all the characters contained in this universe, and categorize them into the type of character they are in the series.

== Main characters ==
=== Bobobo-bo Bo-bobo ===
Voiced by: Takehito Koyasu (Japanese); Richard Epcar (English)

Bobobo-bo Bo-bobo (ボボボーボ・ボーボボ, Bobobōbo Bōbobo) is the main protagonist and title character. Bo-bobo is an eccentric man with bodybuilder sized muscles and a giant, yellow, spherical afro. He fights the forces of evil using his nose hair calling it his "Fist of the Nose Hair" and "Snot Fo-You" technique. He is 27 years old, although his birthday differs between the manga and the anime.

=== Beauty ===
Voiced by: Ai Nonaka (Japanese); Philece Sampler (English)

Beauty (ビュティ, Byuti) is the female heroine of Bo-bobo's group and usually the only girl when Torpedo Girl or Suzu are not around. A stereotypical teenage manga heroine, she is one of the few sane characters who is the first to join Bo-bobo and was the only citizen to still have hair after the attack of the town she lived in. She initially wanted to join Bo-bobo because she sought a life of adventure. Bo-bobo let her join him, but rejected Pickles, stating that he didn't like him, at the same time. She has loving feelings for Gasser after he rescued her, but doesn't say anything about them. She is often exasperated by Bo-bobo's odd behavior or the behavior or actions of others, usually with the same face. She's the only person in the group that doesn't fight, but still criticizes the others' fighting styles. There are a few rare occurrences where she was forced to fight to defend herself, but it's only when Bo-bobo isn't around to protect her and at the last minute someone would come and save her. Beauty worries about her friends' safety and finds them as her own family and though she finds Bo-bobo crazy, she idolizes him greatly. She also is the subject of jealousy and envy of Don Patch, who wishes to be the "heroine" of the show. She seems to be a random girl who joins Bo-bobo's group unil Softon is "revealed" to be her brother, implying that she may have powers of her own or is descended from a powerful bloodline. By the end of the series, she is traveling the world with Heppokomaru/Gasser.

=== Don Patch ===
Voiced by: Masaya Onosaka (Japanese); Kirk Thornton (English)

Don Patch (首領パッチ, Don Patchi), Poppa Rocks in the English manga, is the original leader (or "don") of the "Wiggin Gang" ("Hajikegumi" in Japan), a group of rebels who oppose Czar Baldy Bald IV. Don Patch has henchmen named Lil' Rocks (in the English manga), or Ko Patch. He quits the Wiggin Gang claiming that they never gave him space, but really so he could wig out more with Bo-bobo. He is extremely narcissistic, and demands to be the center of attention; this leads him to hold a grudge against Beauty believing he should be the "heroine" of the show. Don Patch also has a wide variety of personas that he switches into, including a female one named "Patches."

=== Gasser ===
Voiced by: Naomi Shindo (Japanese); Brad MacDonald (English)

Gasser (ヘッポコ丸, Heppokomaru) - Gasser is the quiet but sensible teenage hero of Bo-bobo's group. He has short, spiky white hair with short bangs and Yellow/Gold eyes and also has gold earrings. Gasser is 161 centimeters (5 feet 3 inches) tall and weighs 50 and 55 kilograms (110 and 121 pounds). The "heppoko" in his Japanese name means "untrained", while "maru" is a common name suffix for a samurai or other type of warrior. He uses "True Fart Fist" (Onara Shinken) as his martial art style, known in the English dub as "The Fist of The Back Wind". After his hometown, PuuPuu City, was destroyed by Captain Battleship and his Hair Hunt troopers, Gasser began secretly following Bo-bobo, whom he hoped would help get his revenge on Battleship, briefly breaking from his trail to literally save the hair of a kidnapped Beauty. Gasser followed them to C-Block Base where he once again saved Beauty, and after Wall Man's defeat joined the team, but he rarely is seen fighting. When the collar around his neck is removed, his Fist's power increases dramatically, but his personality reverts to that of an infant. He is another "sane" person among the group like Beauty, getting shocked if someone does something stupid, though he sometimes joins Bo-bobo in his antics or acts oddly on his own. Like Beauty, he admires Bo-bobo from the sidelines and refers to him as "Mr. Bo-bobo".

=== Jelly Jiggler ===
Voiced by: Keiichi Sonobe (Japanese); Jamieson Price (English)

General Jelly Jiggler, known in the Japanese versions as Tokoro Tennosuke (ところ天の助) the captain of the A Block division of Hair Hunters (or "Hair Hunter Troop A") also uses the fighting style "Shivering True Fist" (Purupuru Shinken). In the English dub, it is known as the "Fist of the Wobble-Wobble" and in the English manga, it is called "Shakey-Shake Fist". By the time he officially joins Bo-bobo's team, he possesses a handkerchief with the Japanese hiragana for "Nu" (ぬ) written all over it (ぬのハンカチ Nu no hankachi, the "handkerchief of 'nu'", known in English dub as "the Lucky Hanky" ) which he uses to wipe away tears at first, but eventually leads to an all-out "nu" obsession (By contrast he utterly despises the hiragana character "ne" [ね]!) He's used as a shield by Bo-bobo constantly, but always bounces back (due to his ability to regenerate himself). His Japanese name is a pun on "tokoroten", a type of jelly made from agar, thus his ability to shape himself into any form.

== Secondary characters ==
=== Softon ===
Voiced by: Hikaru Midorikawa (Japanese); Joey Lotsko (English)

Softon (ソフトン, Sofuton) is one of a few characters who consistently maintains sane behavior. Softon's head resembles soft serve ice cream (hence his name). He was the guardian of the "Jet Black Room" of C-Block's "Aitsuhage Tower". Softon uses "Babylon Shinken" (in the English dub, he fights by channeling the power of "the Goddess Blabs-A-Lot"). The shape of his head also resembles the typical manga depiction of feces. In promotional color artwork for the manga, his head is colored brown, whereas in the anime it is colored pink (which is not a U.S. TV edit). It is later revealed that this isn't his real face but a mask used to control his powers (similar to Gasser's collar).

In the series, Softon allies with Bo-bobo's team after Beauty is kidnapped, but doesn't officially join until the battle with Halekulani. In many episodes, Softon's "poop" jokes are directly copied from the manga, but put in the context of ice cream. Later, against Lambada, Softon reveals he was given the power of the Black Sun by J and combines it with Goddess Blabs-A-Lot. In the anime he is shown to have a locket with a picture of a brown haired boy and Beauty (he dismisses it, saying "Why do i have this? I don't have any kids"). Later, during a battle in the Hair Kingdom against a Blabs-a-Lot assassin, it is finally revealed that he is Beauty's older brother, explaining the connection he consistently has to her. He is also the mascot of an ice cream shop.

=== Dengakuman ===
Voiced by: Tomoko Kaneda (Japanese); Donn A. Nordean (English)

Dengakuman (田楽マン) is the "cute mascot character" of Bo-bobo. The name is connected to "Dengaku", a snack food consisting of grilled tofu dipped in miso on a stick, which is his favorite food. At one time the little white guy was the head of the Z-Block, the most powerful of the Hair Hunting blocks. His major concerns in life are making people eat dengaku and making as many friends as possible. Though he gains friends, some of them ignore him. Bo-bobo and friends taught Dengakuman the true meaning of friendship and Dengakuman repaid them by saving their lives with Super Dengaku Punch in the OVER arc. Soon he became their friend and joined the team. He is a white super deformed creature with a pointy head with a ball attached to his head and bears a strong resemblance to the Pillsbury Doughboy.

His trademark line, "We'll / I'll make 'em eat grilled tofu dipped in miso on a stick!" is a pun much of the American demographic won't understand, but is still used in the English-language anime nonetheless. Dengakuman can be violent but often he is portrayed as being an extremely weak character. Dengakuman actually claims that he is a dog, but he was only raised by dogs. Dengakuman can fuse with Bo-bobo to create a magical blonde popstar named Denbo; they become Super Denbo-chan if Dengakuman fuses with Super Bo-bobo.

=== Hatenko ===
Voiced by: Daisuke Kishio (Japanese); Jason Palmer (English)

Hatenko (破天荒, Hatenkō) is a member of Don Patch's 'Hajikegumi' gang. A common mistranslation lists him as Don Patch's godson. His name means "unprecedented" and he wields the "Kagi Shinken" ("Fist of the Key"). Like Bo-bobo, he is one of the few survivors from the Kingdom of Hair. He attacks enemies with keys and is obsessed with the courage and actions of his "boss", Don Patch. (In the English dub, he calls him "The Don") .

Hatenko was first found in the desert after being dumped by Torpedo Girl. He was then rescued by the KoPatches and was brought back to Don Patch (who was frying on a pan). From that moment on, he joined the Wiggin Gang. Before then, Hatenko first met with Torpedo Girl right after betraying the J-Block Base that he once worked with.

Hatenko briefly joins Bo-bobo's group, then leaves to migrate with his "family" to find food at baseball stadiums, but he really left so he could find someone to cure the curse mark OVER gave him.

Towards the climax of the series, Hatenko finally confronts Bo-bobo towards his true mission: returning to the Hair Kingdom to put a stop to his own evil brothers: Bababa-ba Ba-baba and 'Bibibi-bi Bi-bibi. While both he and one of Bo-bobo's brothers, Bebebe-be Be-bebe are seemingly killed during the final showdown with Bi-bibi, both of them are seen as ghosts assisting Bo-bobo as he partakes in his final showdown. Revived after the last battle, he decides to go into outer space at the end of Part 1, choosing to continue searching for Ba-baba.

=== Torpedo Girl ===
Voiced by: Hiromi Nishikawa (Japanese); Melodee Spevack (English)

Torpedo Girl (魚雷ガール, Gyorai Gāru) is a powerful, unpredictable force not even Bo-bobo and his Wiggins quite understand when she first appears. Compared to her "other half" Over, she is a living female torpedo with human arms and legs. Furthermore, compared to the patient anger held by the human form, she gets annoyed by even the slightest of comments, immediately responding by making her bomb-like body fly towards her opponent and smashing into them with intense force. Even if she explodes, she will reassemble instantly. Unlike Over, she is actually 28 years old. It is unknown why she is 28 and Over is three years younger.

== Villains ==
=== Czar Baldy Bald IV ===
Voiced by: Taiki Matsuno (Japanese); Terrence Stone (English)

Tsuru Tsurulina IV (ツル・ツルリーナ4世) / Smoothie IV (Viz manga) / Czar Baldy Bald IV (English dub) is the leader of the "Chrome Dome Empire" (マルハゲ帝国 "Maruhage Empire", lit. baldshaven empire, though the anime changes this from the "Margarita Empire" similar to the drink Margarita). His Japanese name is a Japanese onomatopoeia for something slippery. The Fourth seems easily in control of his empire at the start of the series, but he slowly loses his authority as Bo-bobo and his allies take out his forces, from the Hair Hunters to his "Four Heavenly Kings" to even his prison island of Cyber City.

Eventually, he further lost his grip as he was forced by Hair Hunters cryogenically frozen one-hundred years ago to release their leaders to take over this new era. As much as he hated doing this, the Fourth eventually decided this as the only way to keep his hold on power and defeat Bo-bobo. But when even this fell, the Fourth decided to enact his greatest plan: the "New Emperor Playoff", where all of the most powerful warriors of the empire were gathered together in a battle to determine the next emperor. His plan: let all of his enemies take each other out, allowing for him to regain his grip on power. But what he doesn't expect is Hydrate of the Reverse Maruhage Empire taking over his tourney, using it to become emperor himself! The scared emperor bolts away knowing this, basically abdicating the throne and entering an early retirement alongside Mako-chan and Octopus Carl. Czar Baldy Bald also appears on the dollar bills of Halekulani.

He is undoubtedly the weakest of his empire shown as a cowardly strategist and was the primary villain until the Reverse Maruhage Empire (Shadow Chrome Dome Empire) arc. He is 42 yrs. old.

=== Captain Battleship ===
Voiced by: Ryūzaburō Ōtomo (Japanese); Paul St. Peter (English)

Captain Battleship (軍艦 Gunkan) is the first of the Chrome Dome Empire Big Four, under Czar Baldy-Bald. He is also Bo-bobo's former friend from childhood and sworn rival. This regent-haired, white bearded fighter had also been trained in the Fist of the Nose Hair alongside Bo-bobo in the Hair Kingdom, but turned against his afro-haired friend when Bo-bobo was chosen as the Seventh Master of the Fist of the Nose Hair by their teacher (a juice can). Bo-bobo was chosen over Battleship because Captain Battleship was not a citizen of the Hair Kingdom. Captain Battleship controls his vast military forces from the "Pomade Ring", a sky fortress flying over the destroyed Puppu City (Gasser's hometown). He uses his own style of "Fist of the Nosehair" as well as fights with weird antics, similarly to Bo-bobo. While most of the attacks are his own, his ultimate attack, "Armaggedon", has him calling up the Earth Defense Forces to attack for him. He finally falls after trying to apologize to Bo-bobo for abandoning his friend for his own personal gains, only to face Bo-bobo's anger for acting like a baby.

The next time Bo-bobo and company saw him, he was being punished for his failure by OVER. He was the first one to discover Beauty and Gasser's feelings for each other, and taunts and exploits Gasser due to it. He participated in the new emperor playoffs but lost and, thanks to Bo-bobo, barely escaped death. It seems that he is the longest lasting of the Chrome Dome Big Four. As a Fist of Nosehair user, he is bound to be a little weird (turning into an octopus, blowing up his own ship, have a bad knowledge of numbers). Like Bo-bobo, he is 27 years old. He inexplicably makes an appearance with the main characters in both the first opening and ending sequence of the anime.

=== Kittypoo ===
Voiced by: Yasuhiro Takato (Japanese); Liam O'Brien (English)

Kittypoo (プルプー, Purupu) is a horned cat-faced creature who is also the second of the Chrome Dome Empire Big 4. He fights like the Dragon Ball villain Freeza, to the point of flying around in a craft and mercilessly eliminating his enemies just like the famed manga tyrant. According to him, he's so powerful that even his servants Chocolate Munchie and Lemon Fizz are stronger than Captain Battleship. However, he is easily defeated by Don Patch shortly after he is introduced in both the anime and the manga. He is a participant in the New Emperor Playoffs, and is used as a sacrifice by the Reverse Maruhage.

Kittypoo is best described as a reserved tyrant who is very polite despite his lust to kill. He is very strategic, as he learned all of Bo-bobo's weaknesses and strengths. He is the only Heavenly King to have no major arc in the series with his defeat coming between Bo-bobo meeting Hatenko and the blond's invitation to the Evil House of Blood, allowing him to watch his "boss" Don Patch defeat Kittypoo. His bodyguards include Chocolate Bar, Lemonade Fizz, and Curry.

=== OVER ===
Voiced by: Tomokazu Sugita (Japanese); Liam O'Brien (English)

OVER (オーバー, Ōbā) is the ruthless third member of Chrome Dome Empire Big 4, the four elite members of Czar Baldy Bald the Fourth's Hair Hunting corp. Unlike many Hair Hunters outside those seen much earlier in the series, OVER takes his job of ripping the hair out of the subjects of the Maruhage Empire extremely seriously and will treat all in his gaze as prey. This harshness for his job includes the treatment of his own teammates, as seen by his scalping of both Gunkan and Kitty Poo after their failures against Bo-bobo and the Hajike rebels. Although OVER can and will attack with little or no notice, he mostly controls his hair hunting activities from an ancient Japanese castle, where he controls a platoon of various ninja-like warriors including The Ultimate Five Assassins, who themselves are known for their stealth and abilities.

=== Halekulani ===
Voiced by: Shin-ichiro Miki (Japanese); Joe Cappelletti (English)

Halekulani (ハレクラニ) is the last and the strongest of Czar Baldy Bald's Chrome Dome Empire Big 4. He is the owner of the Holy Guacamole Land amusement park. His main attack style is the Fist of Gorgeousness. This involves the control and manipulation of all monetary items, from coins to paper money to precious jewels. One of the most devastating of these attacks include wrapping his opponent with paper bills to transform them into what they are worth. He can also send opponents into a world based on the board game sugoroku and power up his "Gorgeous Shinken"(ゴージャス 真拳 Super Fist of Gorgeousness in the dub) abilities by fusing with the many precious gems he can collect all over his armor. His personality is more realistic than the rest of the Big 4, not making a big deal of the intruders and giving the impression of a bored trillionaire. He even begins to doze off as Bo-bobo and his allies struggle to reach him to fight. He has been shown to be cruel as he told a soldier to make the slaves work harder till they made a millions worth of money. He is obsessed with money, even to the point he can insane saying money repeatedly in a crazed stance.

He later becomes a key ally in the fight against the Reverse Maruhage Empire after losing to Crimson and LOVE in the new emperor playoffs. Halekulani mentions he was a man with a difficult choice 20 years ago, a man named Czar Baldy-Bald the 4th decided to help him by giving him what would define his life. During those years, he eventually got bored and left the Empire. Halekulani eventually returned to his boring career as head of Holy Guacamole amusement park and find a future friend in Bo-bobo. Halekulani manipulates his money much like how Gaara from Naruto manipulates his sand, using his own will. He also makes his first appearance bathing in money.

=== Giga ===
Voiced by: Tomokazu Seki (Japanese); David Lodge (English)

Giga (ギガ) is the leader of the prison island of Cyber City, the most powerful district of the Bald Empire, and Czar Baldy Bald's right-hand man (though this could be seen as blackmailing). His main ability is the power of "Obuje Shinken" (Fist of Objects オブジエ 真拳, dub: "Fist of Object D'Art"), which allows for the creation of pieces of art that he uses to attack. This ability also allows him to transform enemies, particularly those with "Shinken" abilities, into art both for his collection and to assist him in powering up upon breaking them. After absorbing many of his creations, he is able to transform into "Super Giga", which has more powerful armor and much longer pigtailed hair. Bo-bobo finally puts a stop to him with the ultimate powers of "Hanage Shinken". He is also a participant in the new emperor playoffs, where he is crushed off-screen by Crimson, and he gets beaten by Hiragi in Shinsetsu Bobobo-bo Bo-bobo. He is 34 yrs. old. He is known for his supreme over-confidence to the point that he feels that when he fights that he doesn't even need a super fist.

=== Czar Baldy Bald the III ===
Voiced by: Ryōtarō Okiayu (Japanese); David Lodge (English)

Tsuru Tsurulina III (ツル・ツルリーナ3世 Tsuru Tsurulina 3-Sei) is the old emperor of the Margarita Empire, locked away within the center of "Neo Hair-Hunt Land MAX" (ネオ毛狩りランドMAX, Neo Kegari Rando MAX, an amusement park thrown right on top of the old A-Block Amusement Park). Although he appears to be human, he is actually a demon cyborg. He uses "Red Magic Shinken" (真紅の手品真拳 Fist of Red Magic, read as "Reddo Majikku Shinken," which creates attacks based on magic tricks) to avoid the attacks of his enemies and attack them back physically, and "Blue Magic Shinken" (高型の手品真拳 Fist of Blue Magic, read as "Burū Majikku Shinken", released only within a special universe he creates through a magic handkerchief) to destroy souls and minds. Unlike the current emperor, who wants everyone to be bald, Czar Baldy Bald III wants to destroy all humans and then get the "Hair Ball", the source of power of the Hair Kingdom which gives them their hair abilities, for himself. He absorbs Bo-bobo, thinking he may be able to obtain it that way, and also absorbs Don Patch (since Bo-bobo wants a travel buddy), eventually changing into a very strange form. Bo-bobo and Don Patch manage to escape from inside him, and then defeat him once and for all with a technique, named the "Human Highlife in HD", showcasing all the wonderful things about life and being a human (such as getting a job, falling in love, etc.) At the end of "Part 1", Czar Baldy Bald the 3rd finally gains a "Hair Ball" and takes advantage of a vacuum in power, becoming emperor and declaring this land as the "Neo Maruhage Empire."

Bo-bobo's team faces him one final time at his headquarters: the Shueisha building in his final battleground of "Tokyo's 23rd Ward". Although still fighting with the power of the "Red Magic Shinken", he was now more powerful with the combination of a Hair Ball, his eventual successor, Tsuru Tsurulina the Fifth (Yononaka Namerō). After a battle with Bo-bobo and his allies, he takes several ultimate attacks, culminating with Bo-bobo smashing him with "a weak arm chop", destroying him. His final words were in celebration of the Chrome Dome Empire he had created and how others will still rise to fight against Bo-bobo and his rebels.

== Others ==
- Hydrate (ハイドレート)

Voiced by: Shigeru Chiba (Japanese); Kirk Thornton (English)

The mad ruler of the Reverse Chrome Dome Empire, which exists underground beneath the castle of the regular Chrome Dome Empire. Hydrate is the younger brother of Baldy Bald IV, and was forced into the shadows due to Baldy Bald IV becoming the ruler of the country. He interrupts the Bald Bowl in an attempt to usurp his brother and become Czar Baldy Bald V. He is 38 yrs old. On a sidenote, he is the last seen enemy at the end of the anime.

- Bibibi-bi Bi-bibi (ビビビービ ビービビ)

Bibibi-bi Bi-bibi is the second child of the Five Hair Siblings (older brother to Bu-bubu, Be-bebe and Bo-bobo, but younger than Ba-baba). He is the leader of the "New Hair Kingdom" and the final opponent of the first part of the Bobobo-bo Bo-bobo manga. Although he is the second child, he is the master of the most powerful of the five hair-based Shinken: "Kami no Ge Shinken" (Fist of Head Hair), allowing him the control of the hair of his head and the ability to stop other hair abilities such as nosehair or leghair.

- Rice (ライス)

Voiced by: Hiro Yūki (Japanese); Yuri Lowenthal (English)

A Wiggin Specialist and assassin encountered on the top floor of Wiggin Block. He is defeated by Bo-bobo's "Pineapple Custard Pudding". He later assists in the battle against the former Hair Hunters, where he is defeated again by Lambada.

- Dark Yasha (闇夜叉, Yami Yasha)

Voiced by: Paul St. Peter

The Maruhage Empire's strongest executive. Initially appearing as a serious older man in a kimono, this warrior becomes Bo-bobo's main opponent in the death battle arena "Bottle Age" (filled with giant water bottles) in the first true stage of the journey to Chromedome Castle. Manipulating "Dokuro Shinken" (ドクロ真拳Fist of Skulls), he has various abilities including the ability to create fighting skeletons, manipulate a skull sword or place a special seal that forces an opponent's bones out of their body. Furthermore, he can further transform into a demonic form using a special "Skull Sake". His name was never said in the English anime.

- Gunkan's Five Great Warriors (軍艦5人衆, Gunkan Go-Ninshū)

Loincloth Lloyd Voiced by: Hisayoshi Suganuma
Calendar Voiced by: Hirofumi Tanaka
June 7 Voiced by: Kosuki Toriumi (Japanese); Michael Sorich (English)
Tough-Looking Guy Voiced by: Keiichi Sonobe (Japanese); David Lodge (English)
Death Mask Voiced by: Daisuke Sakaguchi

The five elite warriors of Gunkan's forces (who occasionally number in six), all of them remain hidden under cloaks and masks until the moment each one goes into battle. When Bo-bobo's team infiltrate the Pomade Ring, they must fight each one one-on-one based on the warp panel chosen (though Gasser almost fights all six at once at one point). Though only two of them lost (only one lost in the manga); they overpowered the rest of the team by stupidity (Loincloth Lloyd), obvious size difference (Tough-Looking Guy), and better to eat for a dog (Gum). Like Bo-bobo, his elite are a bunch of utterly random characters that just happen to appear in the series (for example, a piece of gum, an insanely large man, a calendar, a torn page of a calendar, a muscular man with a cat head, and a Kinnikuman-like boy with a loincloth).

- J (ジェイ)

Voiced by: Jūrōta Kosugi (Japanese); Michael Sorich (English)

Known as the "Messenger of the Black Sun", this suited, mustache-wearing man (with a head no one knows whether it is an onion or garlic) controls the power within Cyber City. He is a master of "Kurotaiyō Shinken" (黒太陽真拳 Fist of the Black Sun), allowing him to attack with powerful black suns and illusions created from five black suns created in his field. He appears again during the new emperor playoffs (where Bo-bobo calls him "Q" for some odd reason), but loses early on to Menma. Out of all the many ridiculous villains in Cyber city, J seems to be the most serious and he can be rather cruel in battle. It is unknown whether J's name stands for anything. His weird head and godlike powers make him Softon's dark counterpart.

- Halon Oni (ハロンオニ; Maloney Oni)

Halon Oni Voiced by: Daisuke Sakaguchi (Japanese); Quinton Flynn (English)
Maloney Oni Voiced by: David Lodge

A boy with a demonic tail who is a member of the Reverse Cromedome Empire, as well as part of their Cromedome Big Four. He has an uncanny resemblance to Gasser in appearance. His main ability is "Sword Yamiken" (Dark Fist of Swords), which allows him to summon swords of various sizes at will. Initially, Halon works with a penguin-like creature called Slim, but eventually betrays him. He has a demonic tail that can vastly increase the size of his opponents, which he uses to puncture Gasser, turning him into a giant battlefield stuck in the ground until his collar comes off (due to DonPatch taking it off) and he goes into baby mode. After being annihilated by Baby Gasser, he upgrades himself into a more demonic form with wings and an immense sword.

- Crimson (クリムゾン)

Voiced by: Kenta Miyake (Japanese); Liam O'Brien (English)

A three-eyed member of the Reverse Maruhage Empire's Four Heavenly Kings, he is first implied by defeating Giga effortlessly offscreen during the New Emperor Playoffs. He is also the first opponent faced by the allies of Bo-bobo heading up through Hydrate's floating fortress. Crimson uses his abilities of "Mitsume Yamiken" (Dark Fist of Three Eyes) to create giant floating eyeballs to perform various tasks, mostly for offensive purposes (like firing lasers) and looking over his arena. As guardian of the first level of Hydrate's fortress, he controls the "Cinematic Hour" stage, forcing his opponents (in this case Bo-bobo, Tennosuke and Halekulani) to take part in various life-or-death movie scenarios.

- LOVE (ラブ)

Voiced by: Makiko Ohmoto (Japanese); Mona Marshall (English)

Though she appears like a normal woman, she reveals that she is a dominatrix when it came time for battle and the last of the Reverse Chrome Dome Big 4. She also loves men with big muscles so she has a factory that runs on a conveyor belt that gives men bulging muscles. She attacks by the power of Oiroke Yamiken (Dark Fist of Sexy), which includes fighting with a whip as well as blowing kisses and smooching the opponents. Her actions (as well Tennosuke, unintentionally) transforms OVER back into Torpedo Girl, making her much harder to stop and forcing LOVE to transform into an immense bird creature. She reverts to her normal form, only to be killed by Don Patch.

- Bebebe-be Be-bebe (ベベベーベ ベーベベ)

Voiced by: Paul St. Peter

The guardian of the fourth floor "Moon Sati-Field ZO", he seems like a cool-appearing male consistently in black and smoking, but while Bo-bobo's favorite sibling in his youth, he was abducted by Hydrate twenty years prior and brainwashed to work for the Reverse Maruhage Empire.

- Bababa-ba Ba-baba (バババーバ・バーババ)

The eldest of the five children of hair. Although merely mentioned and never appearing in the series, he is believed to have an evil aura just like Bibibi-bi Bi-bibi. Due to a process of elimination regarding the "five hairs", it is believed he would be the master of "Munage Shinken" (Fist of Chesthair). Early in the arc, we see him talking with younger brother Bi-bibi and it does seem he does have a bit of control of the actions in the Hair Kingdom. At the end of Part 1, Hatenko decides to go into outer space in search of Ba-baba. Outside of his Hair Kingdom cameo, he remains unseen throughout the entire series.

- Shigeki X (シゲキX)

The leader both of "East Bodysoap Tower" battle arena and the 1st District of the Hair Kingdom. He first appears as a yellow, Don Patch-like being who believes in the philosophy of Shigeki, like Don Patch believes in his Hajike skills and abilities. One of these attacks, an X-shaped dimension, is used to trap Bo-bobo and Don Patch and force them to absorb the true power of Shigeki.
