= AKBingo! =

- The show's final title card, used from 2016
- Genre: Variety show
- Created by: Yasushi Akimoto
- Directed by: Eiichiro Mori (Only One); Akihide Yoshihama; Yuki Koiwai
- Presented by: Bad Boys (2008-2016); Woman Rush Hour (2016-2019)
- Starring: AKB48 and sister groups
- Narrated by: Seiji Iwami (Crazy Box)
- Opening theme: "Aitakatta" by AKB48 (until November 2016)
- Composers: Yasushi Akimoto; BOUNCEBACK
- Country of origin: Japan
- Original language: Japanese
- No. of seasons: 11
- No. of episodes: 560

Production
- Producers: Ryoko Ihara; Takashi Watanabe; Sanae Murakami; Shinobu Mori; Hiroyuki Nakamura; Seiichi Itoi
- Running time: 30 minutes
- Production companies: AKS; E Company; Acro; Nippon Television

Original release
- Network: Nippon Television
- Release: October 1, 2008 – September 24, 2019

Related
- AKB48 Show! NogiBingo! KeyaBingo!

AKBingo! (stylized in all caps) is a Japanese television variety show featuring Japanese idol girl group AKB48. The show aired weekly on Nippon Television. In each episode, members of AKB48 and occasionally their sister groups participate in activities that include quizzes, games, sports, and news.

The original show was cancelled in 2019, and has been succeeded by two different shows since then: AKBingo! NEO and AKB48 Sayonara Mōri-san.

== History ==
AKBingo! is the successor of two previous shows featuring AKB48 with very similar concepts, AKB 0ji 59fun and AKB 1ji 59fun. The concept of the show was reused for the Sakamichi Series groups with NogiBingo! for Nogizaka46, KeyaBingo! for Keyakizaka46 and HinaBingo! for Hinatazaka46, as well as STU48 with SetoBingo! and HKT48 with HKTBingo! in 2018, and SKE48 with SKEBingo! in 2019.

The hosts of the show were changed in June 2016 after 395 episodes, when the owarai comedy duo Bad Boys, consisting of Kiyoto Ōmizo & Masaki Sata, were succeeded by Woman Rush Hour, consisting of Daisuke Muramoto & Paradise Nakagawa.

From episode 414 onwards (November 1, 2016), a new intro and logo came into use.

AKBingo! is one of the shows featured on a 2018 The Ellen DeGeneres Show segment about "outrageous" Japanese game shows.

On August 20, 2019, Muramoto announced that the show would end in September after an 11-year run. The last episode aired on September 24, 2019.

=== 2021: AKBingo! NEO ===
In January 2021, it was announced that a revival project for the show, later titled AKBingo! NEO, would be launched. The twelve participating members would be picked from the top of the member leaderboards in the mobile card game AKB48 no Dobbon! Hitorijime! (AKB48のどっぼーん！ひとりじめ！), in which players can contribute points to support members of their choice, by the end of the month. The top three members (Yuiri Murayama, Nana Okada, and Haruna Hashimoto) had each accumulated more than eight billion points by the end of the contest period (each match in the game, which rules are similar to Uno, yields around 3000 points for the winner and a few hundred points for the other three participants).

The first episode of AKBingo! NEO was released on March 29, 2021 on the BS Nippon satellite television channel, again hosted by Woman Rush Hour. Episode two was released on July 20, in which Muramoto announced that he would leave the show to move to the United States. The final episode was released on December 29, featuring Paradise Nakagawa and the comedy trio Jungle Pocket as hosts.

=== 2022: AKB48 Sayonara Mōri-san ===
In March 2022, it was announced that a new AKB48 variety show, titled AKB48 Sayonara Mōri-san, would start airing in April. The show was titled in honor of producer Shinobu Mōri (毛利忍), who had produced the Bingo! series and other idol variety shows for 13 years, and would be staffed by a new production team in order to "update the show for the Reiwa era". It would be hosted by the comedy duo Shimofuri Myojo and former AKB48 member and AKBingo! regular Minami Minegishi.

== Cast ==
Final

- Daisuke Muramoto – Woman Rush Hour/Host (from June 28, 2016)
- Paradise Nakagawa – Woman Rush Hour/Host (from June 28, 2016)
- AKB48
- SKE48
- NMB48 (from February 2, 2011)
- HKT48 (from 2012)
- NGT48 (from 2015)
- STU48 (from 2017)

Former

- Kiyoto Ōmizo – Bad Boys/Host (October 1, 2008 – June 21, 2016)
- Masaki Sata – Bad Boys/Host (October 1, 2008 – June 21, 2016)

== International versions ==
=== China ===
The Chinese version is titled SNHello 星萌学院 and consists of the members of SNH48, the former Chinese sister group of AKB48 who have since become independent to AKB48. The show is telecast online every Friday starting from July 4, 2014, but the network sometimes offers some "sneak peeks", on Thursdays.

=== Thailand ===
The Thai version is titled Victory BNK48 and stars BNK48, the Thai sister group of AKB48. It aired on Workpoint TV. It is the successor to a previous show featuring the group, BNK48 Show, which was broadcast on Channel 3. There is also a documentary series titled BNK48 Senpai.

=== Philippines ===
MNLife and MNLaugh! both appeared on the official YouTube channel of MNL48, AKB48's Filipino sister group. Both shows were hosted by Luke Conde and a special co-host, who was a member of MNL48 and varied from episode to episode. They were later replaced by MNL48 I-SCHOOL, which also appeared on the group's YouTube channel.
