= All of Us Strangers (soundtrack) =

All of Us Strangers (Original Motion Picture Soundtrack)

Film score by Emilie Levienaise-Farrouch
- Released: 22 December 2023
- Recorded: 2023
- Genre: Film score
- Length: 64:22
- Label: Hollywood
- Producer: Emilie Levienaise-Farrouch

Emilie Levienaise-Farrouch chronology
The Strays (2023)	All of Us Strangers (2023)	The Assessment (2024)

All of Us Strangers (Original Motion Picture Soundtrack) is the film score to the 2024 film All of Us Strangers directed by Andrew Haigh, starring Andrew Scott, Paul Mescal, Claire Foy and Jamie Bell. The film score was composed by Emilie Levienaise-Farrouch and released by Hollywood Records on 22 December 2023, a month prior to the film's theatrical release in the United Kingdom.

== Development ==
In August 2023, it was reported that Emilie Levienaise-Farrouch would compose the score for All of Us Strangers. Levienaise-Farrouch was involved in the project during the post-production stage and considered it a "very special" film while watching the final edit, having connected with the characters and themes, which she knew that she would be able to create a subtle score. There was no prescriptive approach, musically, but he discussed how the scenes meant and his reaction to the music as a way of sensing whether he would communicate the right things with the cues. Though she did not reference any pre-existing music as inspirations, the 1980s pop songs had an impact within the storytelling which led Levienaise-Farrouch allowing the score to fluidly work with those synth sounds. She also did not reference Strangers by Taichi Yamada, and took Haigh's version as the only version, rather having any imagery or expectations in her mind.

Levienaise-Farrouch added that the performances from the cast played a huge role in shaping the music, as she wanted to mirror the intensity of the acting. She did not want the score to be huge and bombastic, due to the subtlety of the film. She decided to use acoustic instruments such as the cello, violin and piano, while also performing synths on the score while watching the film to have the emotional touch. She also admitted that bringing live instruments and musicians, would add so much variation and emotion to the score but Levienaise-Farrouch wanted "to manipulate the acoustic parts enough so that they were like a dream or a memory." Some of the synths used in the score were the Sequential take 5, Moog Sub 25 and the MicroKORG.

== Critical reception ==
David Rooney of The Hollywood Reporter wrote "Emilie Levienaise-Farrouch's pensive electronic score hums and chimes". Wendy Ide of The Guardian wrote "the score, by Emilie Levienaise-Farrouch, harmonises with and complements intricate use of sound". Richard Lawson of Vanity Fair "Emilie Levienaise-Farrouch's jarring score pings and murmurs and drones." Helen Hawkins of The Arts Desk wrote "The music throughout is a perfectly judged mix of 1980s disco and a pulsing electronic score by Emilie Levienaise-Farrouch, suggesting both the real world and the supernatural one, between which Adam moves." Anna Smith of Rolling Stone UK called it a "haunting score", while Tori Brazier of Metro called it "atmospheric". Matt Glasby of Radio Times wrote "Emilie Levienaise-Farrouch's score, all low shimmering chords, mimics the passing of time." Mark Kermode called it "a fantastic original score".

== Track listing ==
No.	Title	Length
1.	"Overture"	1:50
2.	"Harry"	2:02
3.	"Childhood Objects"	1:53
4.	"Park"	5:25
5.	"Come Back Soon"	2:45
6.	"Remember to Breathe"	2:37
7.	"You Were Just a Boy"	3:42
8.	"Always Running Away"	3:40
9.	"Drifting Over the Edge"	5:09
10.	"Can I Hug You Now"	2:08
11.	"Parents' Bed"	8:13
12.	"Where Would We Go"	2:14
13.	"Sleeping in Their Bed"	2:35
14.	"Always Be Alone"	3:35
15.	"Whose House Is This"	1:40
16.	"Don't Say It"	2:26
17.	"Diner"	4:22
18.	"Harry's Flat"	8:06
Total length:		64:22

== Credits ==
Credits adapted from production notes:

- Music composed and produced by: Emilie Levienaise-Farrouch
- Orchestration: Noa Margalit
- Score recorded by: Mat Bartram
- Score mixed by: Graeme Stewart
- Music editors: Neil Stemp, Francesco Le Metre
- Score coordination: Manners Mcdade
- Music coordination: Georgiamae Bromley
- Music assistance: Noa Margalit
- Violin: Eloisa-Fleur Thom, Ellie Consta
- Cello: Max Ruisi, Claire O'Connell
- Piano: Emilie Levienaise-Farrouch
