= Tobu yume o shibaraku minai =

- Film poster
- Directed by: Eizō Sugawa
- Screenplay by: Eizō Sugawa
- Based on: Tobu yume o shibaraku minai by Taichi Yamada
- Produced by: Masaya Araki
- Starring: Toshiyuki Hosokawa; Eri Ishida; Mariko Kaga; Shinnosuke Furumoto; Toshie Kobayashi
- Cinematography: Shinsaku Himeda
- Edited by: Yoshitami Kuroiwa
- Music by: Toshiaki Tsushima
- Production companies: Eizō Sugawa Productions; Annivers Cosmetics; Araki Office
- Distributed by: Shochiku
- Release date: November 17, 1990 (Japan)
- Running time: 105 minutes
- Country: Japan
- Language: Japanese

Tobu yume o shibaraku minai (Japanese: 飛ぶ夢をしばらく見ない), known in English as A Paucity of Flying Dreams or I Haven't Dreamed of Flying for a While, is a 1990 Japanese romantic fantasy drama film written and directed by Eizō Sugawa. It was Sugawa's final film, adapted from the novel of the same name by Taichi Yamada, which was first published by Shinchosha in 1985. The film stars Toshiyuki Hosokawa as a man who falls in love with a woman, played by Eri Ishida, who ages in reverse. The film also stars Mariko Kaga, Shinnosuke Furumoto and Toshie Kobayashi. Tobu yume o shibaraku minai was theatrically released by Shochiku on November 17, 1990, in Japan. It won several awards, including the Golden Raven for Best Film at the Brussels International Fantastic Film Festival, as well as the Japan Academy Best Supporting Actress award for Eri Ishida's performance, and was also shown at the 40th Berlin International Film Festival. The film's theme song is "Animal" by Kayoko Ito, while its score was composed by Toshiaki Tsushima.

== Premise ==
Shuji Taura is a construction worker in his late forties. He is living in northern Japan apart from his family, having separated from his wife, and feels detached from life. Shuji also experiences surreal, unexplainable dreams that haunt him. One day, Shuji breaks his leg in a train accident and, upon hospitalization, has a strange, sexy conversation with his roommate, who is concealed behind a screen. When she is wheeled out the next morning, Shuji catches a glimpse of her and sees that she is an old woman. After getting out of the hospital, Shuji, having lost his job, returns to Tokyo. The mysterious woman gives him a call and asks to meet. He is reluctant but agrees. When they meet again, she is younger. Shuji discovers that the woman, who is named Mutsuko, ages in reverse. They fall in love with each other, though they struggle to keep the relationship going as Mutsuko grows younger each time they meet.

== Cast ==
- Toshiyuki Hosokawa as Shuji Taura
- Eri Ishida as Mutsuko Miyabayashi
- Mariko Kaga as Yasuko Taura
- Shinnosuke Furumoto as Shinichi Taura
- Toshie Kobayashi as Fumie Shimayo
- Noboru Mitani as Junkichi Kaijima
- Katsuhiro Oida as Takero Miyabayashi
- Rei Okamoto as Yoshiko Takamatsu
- Takashi Sasano as Masatoshi Tomioka
- Hiromitsu Suzuki as Isuke Kojima
- Akira Maeda
- Takashi Naito

== Background ==
The novel, written by Taichi Yamada, was first published in 1985 by Shinchosha. Tobu yume o shibaraku minai has been published in multiple languages, including an English translation by David James Karashima that was published in 2008. The book is considered to be part of a thematic trilogy, along with Yamada's later novels Strangers and In Search of a Distant Voice. Yamada's novel has received generally positive reviews, with reviewers calling it a "metaphysical fantasy" about "the persistence of memory" and how "beauty and death can be two sides of the same coin."

== Production ==
Yoshitami Kuroiwa was a renowned editor who had worked on such films as The Sword of Doom and The Return of Godzilla, among others. Cinematographer Shinsaku Himeda had shot Sugawa's previous film, River of Fireflies.

== Release ==
Tobu yume o shibaraku minai was theatrically released by Shochiku on November 17, 1990, in Japan. The film was released on VHS on July 21, 1991, and later released to Region 2 DVD on March 23, 2005.

== Awards and nominations ==
37th Asia-Pacific Film Festival

- Won: Best Actress (Eri Ishida)

9th Brussels International Fantastic Film Festival

- Won: Golden Raven for Best Film

12th Fantasporto Awards

- Nominated: International Fantasy Film Award for Best Film

64th Kinema Junpo Best Ten Awards

- Best Films List: 20th place

14th Japan Academy Awards

- Won: Outstanding Performance by an Actress in a Supporting Role (Eri Ishida, also won for Tsuribaka Nisshi 2, Tsuribaka Nisshi 3 and Ronin Gai)
