= The North Water =

The North Water may refer to:

- The North Water (novel), a 2016 novel by Ian McGuire
- The North Water (TV series), a television series based on the novel
