= Teru Miyamoto =

Japanese writer (born 1947)

Teru Miyamoto (宮本 輝, Miyamoto Teru; born March 6, 1947) is a Japanese author.

== Biography ==
Miyamoto was born in Kobe, Hyōgo Prefecture, where his father worked in the automotive parts industry. Following a series of business failures by his father, the family relocated frequently across Osaka Prefecture, including a one-year residency in Toyama Prefecture, before permanently settling in Amagasaki, Hyogo Prefecture in 1957.

In his mid-twenties, Miyamoto worked as a copywriter for an advertising agency. During this period, he developed a panic disorder that severely impacted his ability to commute by train, leading him to leave the company to pursue a career as a novelist.

He made his literary debut in 1977 with the novel Doro no kawa (Muddy River, 泥の河), which won the Dazai Osamu Prize. The following year, his second novel, Hotaru gawa (River of Dragonflies, 螢川), was awarded the Akutagawa Prize.

== Bibliography ==
- Doro no Kawa (1977) – Adapted into a 1981 film by Kōhei Oguri.
- Hotarugawa (1978) – Adapted into a 1987 film by Eizō Sugawa.
- Dōtonborigawa (1981) – Adapted into a 1982 film by Kinji Fukasaku.
- Kinshu (1982) – Translated into English in 2005 with the title Kinshu: Autumn Brocade.
- Yu-Shun (1986) – Adapted into a film by Shigemichi Sugita in 1988.
- Hana no Furu Gogo (1988) – Made into a 1989 film by Kazuki Ōmori.
- Ruten no umi (1990) – Adapted into a film by Buichi Saitō in 1990.
- Maboroshi no Hikari – In 1995, the novel was made into a film by director Hirokazu Kore-eda. The English release is entitled Maborosi.

== Prizes ==
- 1977 Dazai Osamu Prize for Muddy River (Doro no Kawa)
- 1978 Akutagawa Prize for River of Fireflies (Hotarugawa)
- 1987 Yoshikawa Eiji Prize for Literature for Yu-Shun

== Honors ==
- 2020 Order of the Rising Sun, 4th Class, Gold Rays with Rosette
