= River of Fireflies =

- Film poster
- Directed by: Eizō Sugawa
- Screenplay by: Eizō Sugawa; Kyohei Nakaoka
- Based on: Hotarugawa by Teru Miyamoto
- Produced by: Kiyoshi Fujimoto
- Starring: Rentarō Mikuni; Yukiyo Toake; Takayuki Sakazume; Tamae Sawada; Takuzo Kawatani
- Cinematography: Shinsaku Himeda
- Edited by: Jun Nabeshima
- Music by: Masatsugu Shinozaki
- Production companies: Kinema Tokyo; Nichiei
- Distributed by: Shochiku
- Release dates: February 21, 1987 (Japan); December 3, 1988 (Soviet Union)
- Running time: 115 minutes
- Country: Japan
- Language: Japanese

River of Fireflies (Japanese: 螢川, Hepburn: Hotarugawa; lit. Firefly River) is a 1987 Japanese coming of age drama film directed by Eizō Sugawa. It was adapted by Sugawa and Kyohei Nakaoka from the Akutagawa Prize-winning novel of the same name by Teru Miyamoto. The film stars Takayuki Sakazume as Takio Mizushima, a boy experiencing sexual awakening, personal growth and death in a financially struggling family. It co-stars Rentarō Mikuni, Yukiyo Toake, Tamae Sawada and Takuzo Kawatani. Kōichi Kawakita served as special effects director for the film's climactic sequence. River of Fireflies was theatrically released by Shochiku on February 21, 1987, in Japan.

== Plot ==
It is the winter of 1962 in Toyama. Ninth grader Takio Mizushima spends his days struggling with burgeoning love for his friend and classmate Eiko Tsujisawa, while high school entrance exams are fast approaching. Takio's best friend steals a picture of Eiko. Meanwhile, debt collectors are harassing Takio's family. His father, Shigeru, ran several businesses after the war and enjoyed prosperity, but has fallen on hard times. His current wife, Chiyo, was once a popular geisha. Shigeru and Chiyo had an affair, and she became pregnant with Takio. Shigeru then abandoned his first wife, Harue, to marry Chiyo. Harue has become a successful innkeeper in the years since.

As the winter drags on, Takio and Eiko remember a local legend once recounted to them by Shigeru. In years with heavy snowfall in April, a massive swarm of fireflies will appear upstream of the mountain river. Any couple who witnesses this spectacle is destined to marry. Takio and Eiko endeavor to see the fireflies when spring comes.

One rainy day, Takio is left alone with his father. Shigeru confesses that Takio is not Chiyo's biological son, but Harue's. Soon after, Shigeru collapses from a cerebral hemorrhage. His hospitalization leaves the family in even more debt, and Takio is forced to care for his father while still a child. His feelings for Eiko remain, but he struggles to balance them with his newfound responsibilities. Takio feels that he is inexorably stepping into the adult world.

Eventually, heavy snow falls in April, and spring arrives. As the cherry blossoms bloom, Takio is forced to confront death amongst his loved ones. Takio's friend gives his picture of Eiko to Takio as a token of their friendship, but shortly afterwards, his friend drowns while on a fishing trip. Soon Shigeru dies too. After the funeral, Chiyo's older brother Kisaburo, who lives in Osaka, visits the family. He urges his sister to move her family to Osaka. Harue also visits the family, dredging up Takio's earliest memory: Harue crying as she said goodbye to him.

Struggling to cope with loss, Takio asks Ginzo, a friend of his father, to take him to see the fireflies. Chiyo and Eiko accompany them. After walking for hours into the depths of the mountains, they come across the river, where they stop and stare in wonder. The legend has come true; they see the massive swarm of fireflies, glowing green in the darkness of the river grove. Takio and Eiko walk into the swarm. They appear to turn into beings of light, and as they stand still in the middle of the swarm, they slowly merge into one.

== Cast ==
- Rentarō Mikuni as Shigeru Mizushima
- Yukiyo Toake as Chiyo Mizushima
- Takayuki Sakazume as Takio Mizushima
- Tamae Sawada as Eiko Tsujisawa
- Takuzo Kawatani as Sekine
- Tomoko Naraoka as Harue
- Chōichirō Kawarasaki as Kisaburo Tatsumi
- Ken Teraizumi as Teacher Matsuzaki
- Taiji Tonoyama as Ginzo
- Hideji Ōtaki as Kametaro Omori
- Gō Awazu
- Takashi Ebata
- Katsuya Hayakawa
- Toshie Kobayashi
- Rinko Saito

== Background ==
The novel, first published in 1977 by Chikuma Shobō, is considered part of Miyamoto's thematic "River Trilogy", the other two installments being Muddy River and Dotonbori River. The novel won the 1977 Akutagawa Prize, one of Japan's most sought after literary awards.

== Production ==
Kōichi Kawakita served as special effects director for the "swarm of fireflies" sequence. The techniques he developed to create the swarm were also used for Godzilla vs. Biollante.

== Release ==
River of Fireflies was theatrically released by Shochiku on February 21, 1987, in Japan. The film was released on LaserDisc on April 21, 1987, and later released on Region 2 DVD on December 20, 2006.

== Reception ==
In a review for Variety, David Stratton called the film "A well-made, though basically familiar tale...but nevertheless an entertaining example of current Japanese cinema." He stated that the climactic scene with the fireflies was "magical", "making up for some of the over-familiar aspects of screenplay and direction earlier in the film." In regard to the filmmaking itself, Stratton said "it’s well acted and lovingly made, with outstanding camerawork of the winter and spring seasons in the little northern town." He also wrote that, being short-lived insects, fireflies were an effective symbol of change in the film's story.

== Awards and nominations ==
11th Japan Academy Awards

- Won: Outstanding Achievement in Cinematography (Shinsaku Himeda)
- Won: Outstanding Achievement in Lighting Direction (Tadaaki Shimada)
- Nominated: Outstanding Achievement in Film Editing (Jun Nabeshima, also nominated for Jiro monogatari and Itazu Kuma)
- Nominated: Outstanding Performance by an Actress in a Leading Role (Yukiyo Toake)

52nd Mainichi Film Awards

- Won: Best Actress (Yukiyo Toake, also won for Yogisha and Yakuza Ladies 2)

60th Kinema Junpo Best Ten Awards

- Best Films List: 17th place
