= The Discarnates =

- Theatrical poster
- Directed by: Nobuhiko Obayashi
- Screenplay by: Shin'ichi Ichikawa
- Based on: Strangers by Taichi Yamada
- Produced by: Kiyoshi Higuchi
- Starring: Morio Kazama; Tsurutarō Kataoka; Kumiko Akiyoshi; Toshiyuki Nagashima; Yuko Natori
- Cinematography: Yoshitaka Sakamoto
- Edited by: Kazuo Ota
- Music by: Masatsugu Shinozaki
- Production company: Shochiku
- Distributed by: Shochiku
- Release date: September 15, 1988 (Japan)
- Running time: 115 minutes
- Country: Japan
- Language: Japanese

The Discarnates (Japanese: 異人たちとの夏, Hepburn: Ijin Tachi to no Natsu) is a 1988 Japanese fantasy drama mystery film directed by Nobuhiko Obayashi from a screenplay by Shin'ichi Ichikawa, based on the novel Strangers by Taichi Yamada. This was later adapted into an English film, All of Us Strangers (2023).

Produced and distributed by Shochiku, the film was released in Japan on September 15, 1988. It was screened at the 16th Moscow International Film Festival where it competed for the Golden St. George but lost to Maurizio Nichetti's The Icicle Thief.

== Plot ==
Hideo Harada is a TV drama writer who lives alone in an apartment after his divorce from his wife. While researching places for his written teleplay, he quickly realizes that he is in Asakusa, his childhood hometown. When he enters a theater, he notices a familiar man, only to find out that it is his long-deceased father, Hidekichi. Hidekichi invites his son to his home where he lives with his wife Fusako.

== Cast ==
- Morio Kazama as Hideo Harada: A TV drama writer who lives alone in his apartment after he divorced Ayako.
- Tsurutaro Kataoka as Hidekichi Harada: Hideo's father and Fusako's husband. He and his wife were killed in a car accident when their son was 12.
- Kumiko Akiyoshi as Fusako Harada: Hideo's mother and Hidekichi's wife.
- Yûko Natori as Kei Fujino: Hideo's neighbor from upstairs.
- Toshiyuki Nagashima as Ichiro Mamiya: Hideo's co-worker at the TV station.

== Awards and nominations ==
31st Blue Ribbon Awards

- Won: Best Supporting Actor (Tsurutaro Kataoka)
- Won: Best Supporting Actress (Kumiko Akiyoshi)

62nd Kinema Junpo Best Ten Awards

- Won: Best Supporting Actor (Tsurutaro Kataoka)
- Won: Best Supporting Actress (Kumiko Akiyoshi)

33rd Mainichi Film Awards

- Won: Excellence Film (shared with Kimurake no Hitobito, Tomorrow and The Silk Road)
- Won: Best Director (Nobuhiko Obayashi)
- Nominated: Best Actress (Kumiko Akiyoshi)

1st Nikkan Sports Film Awards

- Won: Best Supporting Actress (Kumiko Akiyoshi, also won for Tora-san Plays Daddy)

13th Hochi Film Award

- Won: Best Supporting Actor (Tsurutaro Kataoka)

16th Moscow International Film Festival

- Nominated: Golden St. George

10th Yokohama Film Festival

- Won: Best Supporting Actor (Tsurutaro Kataoka)
- 4th Best Film

12th Japan Academy Awards

- Won: Screenplay of the Year (Shin'ichi Ichikawa)
- Won: Outstanding Performance by an Actor in a Supporting Role (Tsurutaro Kataoka, also won for Yojo no jidai)
- Nominated: Picture of the Year
- Nominated: Director of the Year (Nobuhiko Obayashi)
- Nominated: Outstanding Performance by an Actor in a Leading Role (Morio Kazama)
- Nominated: Outstanding Performance by an Actress in a Supporting Role (Kumiko Akiyoshi)
- Nominated: Outstanding Performance by an Actress in a Supporting Role (Yûko Natori)
- Nominated: Outstanding Achievement in Cinematography (Yoshitaka Sakamoto)
- Nominated: Outstanding Achievement in Film Editing (Kazuo Ota)
- Nominated: Outstanding Achievement in Art Direction (Kazuo Satsuya)
- Nominated: Outstanding Achievement in Lighting Direction (Takehiko Sakuma)
- Nominated: Outstanding Achievement in Sound Recording (Mitsuru Shimada, Yukio Obi)
