= Sakazume =

Sakazume (written: 坂詰 or 坂爪) is a Japanese surname. Notable people with the surname include:

- Ryosuke Sakazume (坂爪 亮介; born 1990), Japanese speed skater.
- Takayuki Sakazume (坂詰 貴之; born 1972), Japanese actor.
- Himeno Sakatsume (坂詰 姫野; born 2001), Japanese tennis player.
