= Production Baobab =

Japanese talent agency

Production Baobab Co., Ltd.
- Native name: 株式会社ぷろだくしょんバオバブ
- Romanized name: Kabushiki-gaisha Purodakushon Baobabu
- Type: Kabushiki kaisha
- Industry: Voice acting
- Founded: August 1, 1979; 47 years ago
- Headquarters: Kagurazaka Yamamoto Bldg. 4F Kagurazaka 3-4-1, Shinjuku, Tokyo, Japan
- Services: Talent management
- Website: https://pro-baobab.jp/

Production Baobab (株式会社ぷろだくしょんバオバブ, Kabushiki-gaisha Purodakushon Baobabu) is a voice actor talent management firm in Shinjuku, Tokyo, Japan.

== Attached voice actors ==
=== Male ===
- Masashi Hirose
- Takanori Hoshino
- Masafumi Kimura
- Ikuo Nishikawa
- Jirō Saitō
- Takayuki Sakazume
- Hiroshi Shirokuma
- Jun'ichi Sugawara
- Katsumi Toriumi
- Eiji Yanagisawa
- Hiroya Ishimaru (Still affiliated after retiring in 2023)

=== Female ===
- Sayaka Aoki
- Mioko Fujiwara
- Natsumi Hioka
- Mana Hirata
- Hisako Kanemoto
- Satomi Kōrogi
- Nami Kurokawa
- Chihiro Kusaka
- Mari Mashiba
- Yuki Matsuoka
- Atsuko Mine
- Eri Miyajima
- Emi Motoi
- Manami Tanaka

== Formerly attached voice actors ==
=== Male ===
- Kinryū Arimoto (affiliated with Heiya Kikaku, now deceased)
- Eisuke Asakura (now affiliated with Arts Vision)
- Kenichi Ogata (now affiliated with Umikaze)
- Chō (Yūichi Nagashima) (now affiliated with the Tokyo Actor's Consumer's Cooperative Society)
- Yuzuru Fujimoto (affiliated with 81 Produce before time of death)
- Jun Fukuyama (now affiliated with AXLONE)
- Tōru Furusawa (now affiliated with Kenyū Office)
- Jun Hazumi (now affiliated with Arts Vision)
- Satoshi Hino (now affiliated with AXLONE)
- Katsuhisa Hōki (now affiliated with Aoni Production)
- Kenyū Horiuchi (now the director of Kenyū Office)
- Kazuhiko Inoue (now affiliated with B-Box)
- Ryūzō Ishino (now affiliated with 81 Produce)
- Akira Kamiya
- Takuo Kawamura (now affiliated with Bell Production)
- Kaneta Kimotsuki (affiliated with Winner Entertainment, director of 21st Century FOX now deceased)
- Takurō Kitagawa (now affiliated with Sigma Seven)
- Takehito Koyasu (now the director of Diizufakutorii)
- Yasunori Matsumoto (now affiliated with Sigma Seven)
- Daichū Mizushima (now a freelance voice actor)
- Mugihito (Makoto Terada) (now affiliated with Media Office)
- Hiroshi Naka (now affiliated with Ken Production)
- Shūsei Nakamura (retired/deceased)
- Ken Narita (now a freelance voice actor)
- Hideki Ogihara (now affiliated with Diizufakutorii)
- Takayuki Okada (now affiliated with Kenyū Office)
- Kōsuke Okano (now affiliated with SSP)
- Kenichi Ono (now affiliated with Rush Style)
- Shinya Ōtaki (now a freelance voice actor)
- Takayuki Sakazume (now affiliated with aksent)
- Mitsuo Senda (now affiliated with 81 Produce)
- Yutaka Shimaka (now affiliated with Production★A Collection)
- Noriaki Sugiyama (now affiliated with Stay Luck)
- Katsumi Suzuki (now affiliated with Arts Vision)
- Seiichi Suzuki (deceased, enrolled at the time of death)
- Shinnosuke Tachibana (now affiliated with AXLONE)
- Takashi Taguchi (deceased)
- Nobuyuki Tanaka
- Kazuya Tatekabe (director of Kenyū Office before time of death)
- Kōsei Tomita (deceased)
- Kei Tomiyama (deceased, enrolled at the time of death)
- Keaton Yamada (Affiliated with Remax before retirement)
- Ken Yamaguchi (deceased, the director of OYS Produce until his death)
- Takumi Yamazaki (now affiliated with T.S.P.)

=== Female ===
- Runa Akiyama (affiliated with 81 Produce, now deceased)
- Mayumi Asano (now affiliated with Office Osawa)
- Sachiko Chijimatsu (now affiliated with 81 Produce)
- Yūko Gotō (now affiliated with AXLONE)
- Hitomi Harada (now affiliated with Office Anemone)
- Junko Hori (deceased)
- Teiyū Ichiryūsai (now a freelance voice actress)
- Rei Igarashi (now affiliated with Office Osawa)
- Kazue Ikura (Kazu Ikura) (now affiliated with Aoni Production)
- Mai Kadowaki (now affiliated with Kaleidoscope)
- Tomoko Kawakami (deceased)
- Madoka Kimura (now a freelance voice actress)
- Sanae Kobayashi (now affiliated with Sigma Seven)
- Chie Kōjiro (now affiliated with 81 Produce)
- Naoko Matsui (now the head of UP AND UPS)
- Yūko Mizutani (deceased)
- Masako Nozawa (now affiliated with Aoni Production)
- Noriko Ohara (Then a freelance voice actress now deceased)
- Ai Orikasa (now affiliated with AXLONE)
- Yoshiko Sakakibara (later moved to Tokyo Actor's Consumer's Cooperative Society, currently freelance)
- Yūko Sanpei (now affiliated with AXLONE)
- Yūko Satō (now affiliated with Aksent)
- Mari Shimizu (now affiliated with 81 Produce)
- Kei Shindō (now affiliated with AXLONE)
- Miki Takahashi (now affiliated with SplashDream)
- Kumiko Takizawa (deceased)
- Akane Tomonaga (now affiliated with AXLONE)
- Aki Uechi (Akiko Yajima) (now affiliated with Across Entertainment)
