= Incredible Bodies =

2006 novel by Ian McGuire

- The cover of the first edition, depicting (clockwise from front) protagonist Morris Gutman slumped over a paper, with bottle; Gutman's pregnant wife E; graduate student Dirck van Camper; and Gutman's colleague Zoe Cable.
- Author: Ian McGuire
- Subject: Academia, body theory, studies of literature
- Genre: Campus novel, satire
- Publisher: Bloomsbury
- Publication date: 2006
- Publication place: United Kingdom
- Media type: Print
- Pages: 373
- ISBN: 0747578478
- OCLC: 62477821
- Dewey Decimal: 823.92

Incredible Bodies is a 2006 campus novel by Ian McGuire satirising intellectual fashions and other aspects of academia. It is his first novel. He is also the author of the novel The North Water and Richard Ford and the Ends of Realism.

== Plot ==
Morris Gutman is a largely unsuccessful academic casually employed at the University of Coketown as an English lecturer. His efforts to secure a permanent position are curtailed by his specialisation in the unfashionable novelist Arthur Alderley and his lack of background in Theory. However, after being in collision with a promising research student Dirck van Camper in a carpark, Gutman is able to plagiarise van Camper's article "Total mindfuck: a study in ethics and embodiment," publishing it in the journal Vagina Dentata as his own. Subsequently, he is acclaimed as a leading light in the field of Body Studies, granting him access to the secure employment he desired. Wracked with guilt due to his belief that he killed van Camper, Gutman reveals the hit-and-run to his colleague Zoe Cable, who misinterprets the confession as Gutman telling her that he was van Camper's lover. Cable develops a sexual interest in Gutman, which they act upon while attending a body studies conference in Los Angeles. On their return from the conference, it is discovered that van Camper has recovered, rather than dying as expected, and intends to expose Gutman's appropriation of his work. Gutman, who has by this point grown increasingly erratic and dependent on alcohol, is discredited. His wife divorces him, he is sacked from his academic job, and even spends some time in gaol. After a period of poverty, an opportunity arises for Gutman to re-enter the academic world. A chance meeting with an old acquaintance, however, convinces him that it would be preferable to be satisfied with a "life of cheerful underachievement".

== Reception ==
Incredible Bodies was well received by critics, with Michael McGirr of the Sydney Morning Herald describing it as "witty and punishing" and John Mullan citing it as evidence that "the genre has plenty of misanthropic life in it" in the New Statesman, in addition to noting "[McGuire's] colleagues might feel twitchy if they read his novel."

== Other books ==
- 2015 Richard Ford and the Ends of Realism, University of Iowa Press
- 2016 The North Water, Simon & Schuster/Scribner UK, and Henry Holt and Company
- 2020 The Abstainer, Simon & Schuster/Scribner UK, and Random House
