= Oracion =

- Film poster
- Directed by: Shigemichi Sugita
- Screenplay by: Shunsaku Ikehata
- Based on: Yūshun by Teru Miyamoto
- Produced by: Hide Matsunaga; Satoru Ogata; Hisashi Hieda; Shigeaki Hasama
- Starring: Yuki Saito; Naoto Ogata; Hidetaka Yoshioka; Ken Ogata; Tatsuya Nakadai
- Cinematography: Kazutami Hara; Takao Saito
- Edited by: Keiichi Uraoka
- Music by: Shigeaki Saegusa
- Production companies: Fuji Television; Shigoto Film Production
- Distributed by: Toho
- Release date: July 23, 1988 (Japan)
- Running time: 128 minutes
- Country: Japan
- Language: Japanese
- Box office: ¥1.8 billion

Oracion (Japanese: 優駿 Oracion, Hepburn: Yūshun Oracion; lit. Excellent Steed Oracion), also stylized as Oración and ORACIÓN, is a 1988 Japanese childrens' horse racing drama film directed by Shigemichi Sugita. It was adapted from a two-volume novel written by Teru Miyamoto, first published by Shinchosha in 1986. The film stars Yuki Saito in the lead role, alongside Naoto Ogata, Hidetaka Yoshioka, Ken Ogata and Tatsuya Nakadai. Oracion was theatrically released by Toho on July 23, 1988, in Japan, where it was a financial success and nominated for multiple awards. The film's image song is "Oración: Inori" (ORACIÓN -祈り-) by Saito and Takao Kisugi.

== Premise ==
One day on the small Yoshinaga ranch in Shizunai, Hokkaido, a colt is born. He is descended from the Godolphin Arabian, a legendary stallion. The colt is given the name "Oracion", which means "prayer" in Spanish. When Oracion is grown, he is purchased by struggling electronics manufacturer Heihachiro as a gift for his teenage daughter Kumiko. However, Heihachiro has an ulterior motive for purchasing the horse: if Oracion can win the Japanese Derby, Heihachiro believes the prize money will solve his financial issues. Kumiko and her friend Hiromasa, who helped raise Oracion, train the horse for the big race. Meanwhile, Kumiko learns of the existence of Makoto, an illegitimate son of Heihachiro's who the man treats coldly.

== Cast ==
- Yuki Saito as Kumiko Wagu
- Naoto Ogata as Hiromasa Wataumi
- Hidetaka Yoshioka as Makoto Tano
- Ken Ogata as Senzo Wataumi
- Tatsuya Nakadai as Heihachiro Wagu
- Michiko Hayashi as Tae Wataumi
- Mikijirō Hira as Masuhara
- Ryo Ishibashi as Tokio Tada
- Kōji Ishizaka as Yoshinaga
- Mariko Kaga as Kyoko Tano
- Norihei Miki as Veterinarian Yokota
- Masami Shimojō as Doctor
- Kunie Tanaka as Sunada
- Kazuko Yoshiyuki as Miho Wagu
- Yasuhiro Nemoto as Goro Nara, Oracion's jockey – Nemoto was an active jockey with the Japan Racing Association at the time of the film's production.

== Background ==
When he was a child, Teru Miyamoto's father regularly took him to the racetrack, instilling in him a lifelong love of horse racing. Miyamoto's father also bought him the novel King of the Wind by Marguerite Henry, which would have a direct influence on Miyamoto's own story. After winning the Akutagawa Prize in 1977 for his novel Hotarugawa, Miyamoto decided his next book would feature a thoroughbred as the main character. When coming up with the title, Miyamoto remembered a magazine titled Yūshun that was published by the Japan Racing Association (the word itself had been coined by the Association years earlier). The Racing Association credits Miyamoto's novel with popularizing the term among Japanese horse racing fans.

The novel was more difficult to write than Miyamoto anticipated, and was ultimately preceded by Dōtonborigawa (1981) and Kinshu (1982). In total, it took Miyamoto four years to complete Oracion. He chose to serialize the story chapter by chapter in Shinchosha's monthly magazine "Shincho" from July 1982 to August 1986, after which it was republished in two volumes. Upon republication, it became the winner of the 21st Eiji Yoshikawa Literary Award, making Miyamoto the youngest winner of the award at that time. In addition, the JRA Prize for Equestrian Culture was established the same year of the novel's full publication, in recognition of Miyamoto's contribution to the sport. When asked about the origins of the novel in an interview, Miyamoto stated, "For me, everything is connected to the image of my father. I now know how much my father loved his wife and how much he loved his only son. Or maybe I am trying to depict a father and son through a novel called Yūshun that deals with the world of racehorses."

== Production ==
Prior to directing Oracion, Shigemichi Sugita was known for his work on Kita no Kuni Kara, a successful TV series that was also produced by Fuji Television. The film was his feature directorial debut. It was also the acting debut of Naoto Ogata, actor Ken Ogata's son.

One of the film's cinematographers, Takao Saito, was a frequent collaborator of Akira Kurosawa, having shot his films High and Low and Ran among others.

Oracion was produced with the cooperation of the Japan Racing Association. It was shot in VistaVision. Initially, the production planned to use real footage from the 1987 Japanese Derby for the film's climax. However, the expected winner Material did not actually win the race, instead losing to Merry Nice (ridden by Yasuhiro Nemoto, who was given a role in the film; in addition, the film includes real footage from the 32nd Arima Kinen, in which Nemoto fell off Merry Nice). As all the cameras were trained on Material, this resulted in little usable footage. The production ultimately filmed the scene using retired racehorses. However, the scene was shot multiple times in a row, as the horse playing Oracion repeatedly failed to finish in first place. The horses were pushed to exhaustion by this process, with several collapsing or being injured before filming was completed.

A foal used for the production was later named Mayano Oracion. The horse made its racing debut in 1991.

== Music ==
The film's soundtrack was composed and arranged by Shigeaki Saegusa and released on August 3, 1988 by Pony Canyon, in both CD and vinyl formats.

An image song was commissioned for the film, titled "Oración: Inori" (ORACIÓN -祈り-), which is a duet performed by lead actress Yuki Saito and Takao Kisugi, composed by Takao and with lyrics by Takao's sister Etsuko Kisugi. It was released separately as a single on June 21, 1988 (in LP, CD and cassette formats) and hit number 4 on the Oricon Singles Chart despite ultimately not being featured in the film. The song also hit number 10 on The Best Ten weekly list, as well as number 10 on the show's monthly list. Its B-side was "Hanarashi" (花嵐), performed solely by Saito and written by the Kisugi siblings (the cassette single included karaoke versions of both tracks). Kisugi later released a solo cover of "Oración: Inori" on July 25, 1988, which hit number 96 on the Singles Chart. The song has appeared on various compilations for both artists.

All music is composed by Shigeaki Saegusa:

No.	Title	Length
1.	"Prayer Oracion (祈り・オラシオン)"	10:53
2.	"King of the Winds (風の王)"	3:46
3.	"Encounter (邂逅)"	6:53
4.	"Birth (誕 生)"	7:41
5.	"Round Dance (輪 舞)"	5:12
6.	"The Path of Emerald (覇翠色の道)"	11:42
Total length:		46:07

== Release ==
Oracion was theatrically released by Toho on July 23, 1988, in Japan. The film grossed ¥1.8 billion at the box office.

Pony Canyon acquired home media rights, distributing the film on VHS and LaserDisc on February 20, 1989, and later releasing a DVD on November 29, 2001. The DVD's bonus features included the original theatrical trailer, a photo gallery, cast and crew introductions and a merchandise gallery.

== Reception ==
Kevin Thomas, in a review for the Los Angeles Times, wrote, "Oracion is a grandiose and ludicrous soap opera pumped up with a score that even Max Steiner might have thought a bit much."

After the film's release, a parody titled "Yūshun 2" was performed on the variety show Tonneruzu no Minasan no Okage deshita. Lead actress Saito appeared in the skit.

== Awards and nominations ==
12th Japan Academy Awards

- Won: Newcomer of the Year (Naoto Ogata)
- Won: Outstanding Achievement in Music (Shigeaki Saegusa, also won for Lady Camellia)
- Nominated: Picture of the Year
- Nominated: Outstanding Performance by an Actress in a Leading Role (Yuki Saito)
- Nominated: Outstanding Performance by an Actor in a Supporting Role (Ken Ogata)
- Nominated: Outstanding Performance by an Actor in a Supporting Role (Kunie Tanaka)
- Nominated: Outstanding Achievement in Cinematography (Kazutami Hara, Takao Saito)
- Nominated: Outstanding Achievement in Lighting Direction (Hideki Mochizuki)
- Nominated: Outstanding Achievement in Film Editing (Keiichi Uraoka)
- Nominated: Outstanding Achievement in Sound Recording (Minoru Nobuoka)

63rd Kinema Junpo Best Ten Awards

- Won: Best New Actor (Naoto Ogata)
- Readers' Choice Top 10 Japanese Films of the Year

31st Blue Ribbon Awards

- Won: Best Newcomer (Naoto Ogata)

1st Nikkan Sports Film Awards

- Won: Yūjirō Ishihara Newcomer Award (Naoto Ogata)
