= In Search of a Distant Voice =

Novel by Taichi Yamada

- Author: Taichi Yamada
- Original title: 遠くの声を捜して
- Translator: Michael Emmerich
- Language: English
- Genre: Literature/Supernatural
- Publisher: Faber & Faber
- Publication date: 6 April 2006
- Publication place: Japan
- Media type: Print
- Pages: 183pp
- ISBN: 0-571-22971-9
- OCLC: 62891645
- Dewey Decimal: 895.635 22
- LC Class: PL865.A5128 T6513 2006
- Followed by: Strangers

In Search of a Distant Voice (Japanese: 遠くの声を捜して, Hepburn: Toku no Koe wo Sagashite) is a novel by Japanese writer Taichi Yamada. It was first published in Japan in 1986, and was translated for English-language publication in 2006 by Michael Emmerich.

== Plot ==
Kasama Tsuneo is a young Japanese immigration officer, midway through the preparations for an arranged marriage. While raiding a house in the early-morning hours, one immigrant escapes and Tsuneo takes chase through a neighboring graveyard. As Tsuneo thinks he has the escapee cornered, he is overcome by a huge wave of euphoric emotion. Paralyzed by it, he's immobile and the suspect escapes. Tsuneo recovers, completely perplexed. To his bosses he explains that the suspect tripped him and ran away.

That same night, on the verge of sleep, he is again flooded by a huge wave of paralyzing emotion, this time sadness. As it passes, he hears a female voice saying "Who are you?" in the darkness, which then disappears. Over the next days, Tsuneo starts to hear this voice more, and eventually it responds to him and he begins a dialogue with it. It claims to be the voice of a woman, very lonely, and that with all her energy she somehow "projected" herself into the world, and Tsuneo was the one to answer. Initially Tsuneo thinks it is the voice of "Eric", someone he knew whilst living in America, but in time accepts that this is not so. Tsuneo becomes increasingly fascinated by the voice and their dialogues, and wonders whether he is suffering from auditory hallucinations. Because of his erratic behavior, he is given time off work and must see a doctor. His arranged marriage is also called off for similar reasons.

As the voice continues to speak to him, he asks that he may tell her his story, which has been hinted at throughout. Tsuneo tells the voice how, after his permit runs out in America, he narrow escapes being caught by immigration officials, and one day meets Eric in a city square. Forty-something Eric seems to take pity on Tsuneo, and offers him a job in his shop selling light fittings, and lodgings. However, on one particular night in Eric's care, Tsuneo is approached by the man who then exposes him to physical affection. As time goes by Eric makes multiple more passes at Tsuneo who, definitely opposed but unsure of how to rebuff or break away from Eric (who had been so kind in the beginning) passively submits to Eric's wishes. Tsuneo desperately wishes to escape the relationship, but can see no way out since he has no car and would get arrested by the immigration officials if he ran away (he also suspects Eric knows these facts and is taking full advantage of them). Sometime later, he attempts to escape under the guise of "taking a short break to the sea", but Eric questions why he is taking his passport, and is forced to leave it behind. Instead, while on his trip Tsuneo makes a hoax call to the police, claiming that Eric is in possession of and dealing a large amount of drugs. Tsuneo hopes that while Eric is detained and questioned, he will have a window to escape the country and get back to Japan. However, when the police try to take Eric in there is an accident and Eric is killed.

A while after Tsuneo has related his story to the voice, he asks if the woman behind the voice will meet with him. She reluctantly agrees, and they set a date and time. However, when Tsuneo goes to meet her she is not there, and only leads him down the garden path. Tsuneo is angry with her. She is hurt but apologizes, and says that she will contact him again in 6 months time. If at that time he still wishes to meet her, despite her claim she is unimaginably ugly, then she will concede.

Six months pass, during which Tsuneo still has bouts of intense and irrational emotion, sadness and happiness reminiscent of bipolar disorder. When the voice contacts him again, he does still wish to meet, and a time is set at which to meet her outside a museum. When Tsuneo goes to the museum at the appointed time, the voice directs him towards a tree, behind which a blind girl of about eighteen stands. When she speaks, "Hello Mr Kasama", Tsuneo knows he has been misled again, and expresses his anger towards the voice. It tells him that in future whenever he thinks of her he must remember her in the form of this girl. This is the last Tsuneo hears of the voice. The blind girl tells him that a month beforehand, an 'honest' sounding woman paid her 10,000 yen to stand here, at this time, to wait for a Mr Kasama.
