= Ruten no umi =

1990 Japanese film directed by Buichi Saitō

- Film poster
- Directed by: Buichi Saitō
- Screenplay by: Eizō Sugawa
- Based on: Ruten no umi by Teru Miyamoto
- Starring: Hisaya Morishige; Yumiko Nogawa; Kōichi Satō; Teruhiko Saigō; Yūko Asano
- Cinematography: Kōzō Okazaki
- Edited by: Eifu Tamaki
- Music by: Shin’ichirō Ikebe
- Production company: Union Eiga
- Distributed by: Toho
- Release date: November 3, 1990 (Japan)
- Running time: 128 minutes
- Country: Japan
- Language: Japanese

Ruten no umi (Japanese: 流転の海), also known as Sea of Wandering, is a 1990 Japanese film directed by Buichi Saitō. The lead star is Hisaya Morishige. It is based on Teru Miyamoto`s novel of the same title.

== Cast ==
- Hisaya Morishige as Kumago Matsuzaka
- Yumiko Nogawa as Fusae Matsuzaka
- Kōichi Satō as Tadashi Tsujidou
- Teruhiko Saigō as Taichi Ebihara
- Yūko Asano as Ayako Iwai
- Jun Inoue as Tony Okada
- Rino Katase as Someno
- Gannosuke Ashiya as Chiyoma Maruo
- Takuya Fujioka as Chigusa
- Yumi Takigawa as Chiyotsuru
- Shinsuke Ashida as Kawachi
- Shigeru Tsuyuguchi as Takeshi Tsutsui
- Tomoko Naraoka as Iwai
- Tomokazu Miura as Mokichi Kitazawa
