= Shinnosuke Furumoto =

Japanese actor and voice actor

- 古本 新乃輔
- Born: December 13, 1969 (age 56); Fuchu, Tokyo, Japan
- Occupations: Actor; voice actor
- Years active: 1980–present
- Height: 165 cm (5 ft 5 in)

Shinnosuke Furumoto (古本 新乃輔 (古本 新之輔), Furumoto Shinnosuke; born December 13, 1969) is a Japanese actor and voice actor from Fuchu, Tokyo. He also performed the opening for the anime Sorcerer Hunters with Megumi Hayashibara in which he voiced the main character. He also performed an insert song for the anime H2 as he voiced the main character as well.

== Filmography ==
- F (1988) as Tamotsu Oishi
- Jungle Emperor (1989) as Leo
- Ranma ½ (1989) as Pantyhose Taro and Genji Heita
- Tobu yume o shibaraku minai (1990)
- Urusei Yatsura: Always My Darling (1991) as Rio
- H2 (1995) as Hiro Kunimi
- Junkers Come Here (1995) as Junkers
- Kuma no Pūtarō (1995) as Putaro
- Sorcerer Hunters (1995) as Carrot Glace
- Haunted Junction (1997) as Kazumi "Kazuo" Ryudo
- Arcade Gamer Fubuki (2002) as Arashi

== TV Drama roles ==
- Code Blue as Ooyama Tsuneo (Mary Jane Yoko)
