= The Beast Shall Die =

- Theatrical poster
- Directed by: Eizō Sugawa
- Screenplay by: Yoshio Shirasaka
- Story by: Haruhiko Ôyabu
- Produced by: Sanezumi Fujimoto; Masakatsu Kaneko
- Starring: Tatsuya Nakadai; Hiroshi Koizumi; Reiko Dan
- Cinematography: Fukuzo Koizumi
- Music by: Hisashi Shimonaga, Toshiya Ban
- Production company: Toho
- Distributed by: Toho
- Release date: 9 June 1959 (Japan)
- Running time: 96 minutes
- Country: Japan

The Beast Shall Die (Japanese: 野獣死すべし, Hepburn: Yajū Shisu Beshi) is a 1959 Japanese thriller film directed by Eizō Sugawa.

== Plot ==
The film begins with police detective Okada drinking with his friends. As he is about to leave for home, he is ambushed and shot dead by a man with a gun. The killer stuffs the officer's body into the trunk, steals his car, and later abandons it after stealing another vehicle to make his escape.

At the accounts office of Kanto University, a fourth-year philosophy student suffering from tuberculosis is told that he will be expelled if he fails to pay his remaining dues. Next in line to him is Date Kinhiko, a 26-year-old fourth-year student attending Professor Sugimura's lectures on Modern American Literature. Date also does part-time translation work for Sugimura, who then publishes it under his own name. While Date is with his girlfriend Teiko, a radio broadcast announces the discovery of the dead officer's body in the abandoned car. Investigators identify a .22-caliber bullet similar to those used at the National Defence University and find a fingerprint at the scene. Teiko suggests that Date pursue foreign education by entering an essay contest organized by the Ridgeway Foundation instead of continuing low-paid translation work for Sugimura.

Detective Masugi, who is investigating the murder, has a fiancée working at a hostess bar called Lolita. Date is also seen drinking there. Later, Date impersonates a police officer and arrests a Chinese casino owner named Charlie Chen as he is leaving the casino for unlawful gambling. He knocks out the bodyguard, takes Chen into his own car, drives to a secluded area, threatens him to stay silent, then knocks him unconscious and steals his bag of money. He returns to his apartment in his rental car and disposes of the fake license plate he had attached to it during the escape. It is revealed that Date is applying for foreign education as suggested by his girlfriend. Charlie Chen hires a hitman named Yasu to recover the stolen money. The next morning, Date tells his landlord that he plans to move out after getting married. He also returns his rental car used to make his escapes. Investigators determine that the fingerprints found on the car in which the body of Okada was found, belonged to the vehicle's owner, not the killer.

Masugi visits his fiancée at the bar, where cracks in their relationship begin to show. An old lady selling flowers interrupts them, but Masugi shoos her away. In the same bar, Date draws attention by buying all her flowers, forcing her to drink alcohol, and offering her money to sing and dance. When someone intervenes, Date leaves, and Masugi tries to follow him outside.

Later, Date meets Sugimura, who questions if he will be able to fund himself for the foreign education. Sugimura also informs him that his translations are selling well and that his paper, "The Brutality of Modern Human Beings", was well received at a conference. Sugimura says he sent it to the Ridgeway Foundation for the essay contest, which if won, would grant Date a scholarship to study at Harvard. Their conversation is interrupted by a reporter from the Chuo Times seeking Sugimura's comments on the detective's murder. Unaware of the case, Sugimura allows Date to offer his opinions, which Sugimura permits to be reported as his.

Date later meets the student from the accounts office and invites him to bet on the bike race, but the student refuses, saying he cannot even afford food. At a restaurant, he reveals that his mother died of tuberculosis when he was born and his father, a bank manager, committed suicide. Meanwhile, Masugi and Kawashima are thinking of reconsidering the suspect profile after reading Date's thoughts in the newspaper. Later Musugi arrives at the University and questions Teiko about Date's whereabouts. After finding him at a boxing club, he confronts Date, telling him he has seen him before and suspects him as the killer based on his responses to his questions.

Later, Date spots the bodyguard of the Chinese casino owner walking with Yasu, the hired hitman. He steals a car and flees, chased by the two men. He hides in an abandoned facility and engages them in a shootout, killing both. The next day, investigators determine that the gun used in the shootout was the same one issued to the murdered detective. With Charlie Chen having fled to China, they conclude it was a Yakuza turf war.

Meanwhile Masugi is strongly suspecting Date to be the killer after studying his background. Date meets with the student at the movie hall as previously agreed, they both plan to rob the accounts office. In the next scene, Sugimura talks about Date placing third at the Ridgeway contest and winning the scholarship abroad.

That night, Date climbs up to the research lab and throws a dynamite inside, while the student enters the accounts office in disguise, Date also enters the room during the commotion and kills a security guard, the student kills everyone in the room. After escaping the scene they hide the evidence and stash. Date gives the student a drink laced with sedatives while Date listens to police radio to find that they are searching in the wrong area with wrong clues. Their car is stopped at a police checkpoint but Date is able to deceive them and move along. Date then kills the student and dumps the car with the body into the sea. At the crime scene, Masugi concludes that Date is the killer and plans to stop him before he flees to the U.S. He and Kawashima manage to convince his superiors to issue an arrest warrant after much effort.

Soon after Date reaches his residence and checks his mailbox to find the letter about hsi contest win, the cops arrive after him. He manages to reach his girlfriend's apartment. She suspects that it was him who blew up the research lab, she also tells her that she has aborted his child. Musugi and his assistant Kawashima arrive there as well for questioning his whereabouts at the time of the crime, his girlfriend answers that he was with her, the police's demand to search the apartment is turned down when Date states that they only have the warrant for his apartment not of her girlfriend. After police leave, he hands over the money to his girlfriend saying that he no longer needs the money as he has won the scholarship for studying abroad.

At the airport, Masugi watches Date, hoping to catch him smuggling money. But Date boards the plane without taking any cash from anyone. Dejected, the detective remarks that he lost, and Date won. As they prepare to leave, they spot Teiko with the bag containing the money approaching the airport but turning back and entering a bus after realising that plane had departed. They follow her, noting that it was Date's mistake to not kill her. The film ends with the plane flying off into the sky.

== Cast ==
- Tatsuya Nakadai as Date Kinhiko
- Hiroshi Koizumi as detective Musugi
- Reiko Dan as Teiko
- Eijiro Tono as detective Kawashima
