= All of Us Strangers =

2023 film by Andrew Haigh

- Theatrical release poster
- Directed by: Andrew Haigh
- Written by: Andrew Haigh
- Based on: Strangers by Taichi Yamada
- Produced by: Graham Broadbent; Peter Czernin; Sarah Harvey
- Starring: Andrew Scott; Paul Mescal; Jamie Bell; Claire Foy
- Cinematography: Jamie D. Ramsay
- Edited by: Jonathan Alberts
- Music by: Emilie Levienaise-Farrouch
- Production companies: Blueprint Pictures; Film4 Productions
- Distributed by: Searchlight Pictures
- Release dates: 31 August 2023 (Telluride); 26 January 2024 (United Kingdom)
- Running time: 105 minutes
- Country: United Kingdom
- Language: English
- Box office: $20.2 million

All of Us Strangers is a 2023 British romantic fantasy film written and directed by Andrew Haigh, and based on the 1987 novel Strangers by Taichi Yamada. It stars Andrew Scott, Paul Mescal, Jamie Bell, and Claire Foy. The second feature adaptation of the novel, after the Japanese film The Discarnates (1988), the film follows a lonely screenwriter who develops an intimate relationship with his mysterious neighbour while revisiting memories from the past.

All of Us Strangers premiered at the 50th Telluride Film Festival on 31 August 2023, and was released in the United Kingdom by Searchlight Pictures on 26 January 2024. It received critical acclaim, was named one of the top ten independent films of 2023 by the National Board of Review, and earned six BAFTA Award nominations. The film was also named Film of the Year and LGBTQ Film of the Year by GALECA: The Society of LGBTQ Entertainment Critics (Dorian Awards).

== Plot ==
Lonely television screenwriter Adam lives a secluded life in London. At his tower block, he meets his drunk neighbour Harry, who wants to join him for the night. Reluctantly, Adam declines and sends Harry away. Adam visits his suburban childhood home, now unoccupied. He encounters his parents, who died in a car crash decades earlier just before he turned twelve, and appear as they did at the age they died. Adam has dinner with them and promises to visit again.

Returning to his flat, Adam encounters Harry by the lift, and reciprocates Harry's interest. They develop feelings for each other. Harry confides how distant he feels from his own family, and Adam opens up about the loss of his parents. Adam has several meetings with his parents. During a talk with his mother, Adam reveals his homosexuality, which she accepts despite her concern and slight discomfort. On a later visit with his father, Adam discusses being hurt by his silence about the bullying Adam experienced as a child. The two reconcile.

As Adam and Harry's relationship flourishes, the two go clubbing and take ketamine. Adam admits it is his first time while Harry implies he is a frequent user. During the trip, Adam finds himself in his childhood bed at Christmas. He and his parents hang lights on the Christmas tree and celebrate happily. Unable to sleep, Adam gets in bed with his parents and tells his mother about being sent to stay with his grandmother after her death, which his mother laments.

Harry suddenly appears next to Adam, who then finds himself on a London Underground train, seeing Harry in various places on the train and station, before seeing a distorted reflection of his younger self screaming before he wakes up in his flat. Harry tells him he brought him home after Adam acted strangely. Adam discusses the details of his parents' death, revealing that his father died instantly, but his mother, who lost an eye in the crash, lingered for three days in the hospital. His grandmother kept Adam from seeing his mother due to her dire condition, which has haunted him.

Adam takes Harry to his parents' house to meet them – not telling Harry where they are or why. Adam finds that his parents are not present, even after yelling and banging on the doors and windows. Growing concerned for Adam, Harry demands Adam tell him where they are. Harry urges them to leave, just as they both see a faint image of Adam's mother through a window. Horrified and confused, Harry steps back as Adam pounds on the door, breaking a window.

Waking up the next morning with his parents, they explain that Harry went home. They tell Adam that in order for him to find happiness, he must let them go and move forward in his life with Harry. They take him to his favourite childhood restaurant, where they ask if their deaths were quick and painless. Adam claims they both died instantly, a particular relief to his mother. The three reaffirm their love for each other, after which Adam's parents vanish.

Having accepted the loss of his parents, Adam goes home to see Harry. Entering Harry's flat, he notices an awful stench, with ketamine residue on a table and squalor throughout the flat. Adam finds Harry dead in the bedroom, holding the same whisky bottle he was drinking from the night they met. Adam realizes that Harry overdosed on the night that Adam thwarted his advances.

In the kitchen Adam finds Harry, holding the whisky bottle and in his corpse's clothes. Distraught and embarrassed, Harry wonders why no one has found his body, and Adam reminds him that he has. Adam assures Harry that everything will be all right, and takes Harry back to his flat. The two lie in bed together. When Harry asks Adam to play a record, Adam remembers the lyrics Harry sang to him the first night they met in the doorway. He starts to sing "The Power of Love" by Frankie Goes to Hollywood. Harry relaxes as Adam continues to stroke his hair and whisper the song into his ear.

== Cast ==
- Andrew Scott as Adam
  - Carter John Grout as young Adam
- Paul Mescal as Harry
- Jamie Bell as Adam's father
- Claire Foy as Adam's mother

== Production ==
Graham Broadbent and Sarah Harvey of Blueprint Pictures first pitched the project to Yamada in June 2017. Later that year, Haigh and Film4 Productions came on board. Haigh described his adaptation of the novel as "a long and sometimes painful process". He said, "I wanted to pick away at my own past as Adam does in the film. I was interested in exploring the complexities of both familial and romantic love, but also the distinct experience of a specific generation of gay people growing up in the 80s. I wanted to move away from the traditional ghost story of the novel and find something more psychological, almost metaphysical."

On 30 June 2022, the film, then known as Strangers, and the principal cast were announced. The announced plot was brief and vaguely worded, and attracted inquiries on social media as to whether the film involved a romance between Scott and Mescal's characters.

Filming was in progress in the United Kingdom when the announcement was made. Haigh's childhood home served as the filming location for the house in which Adam finds his parents. Nightclub sequences were shot on location at the Royal Vauxhall Tavern.

== Music ==
The film score was composed by Emilie Levienaise-Farrouch. The film soundtrack also featured many 1980's pop songs, including several by gay artists (Frankie Goes to Hollywood and Pet Shop Boys). The featured songs include:

- "The Power of Love" by Frankie Goes to Hollywood (1984). In addition to this song being played, its lyrics are both spoken and sung by various characters during the film.
- "She Who Dares" by Colman Brothers (2007)
- "Johnny Come Home" by Fine Young Cannibals (1985)
- "Is This Love?" by Alison Moyet (1986)
- "Build" by The Housemartins (1987)
- "I Want a Dog (2018 Remaster)" by Pet Shop Boys (1988)
- "Death of a Party (12" Death/Death of a Party)" by Blur (1997)
- "I Don't Want to Set the World on Fire" by The Ink Spots (1941)
- "Promised Land" by Joe Smooth (1987)
- "Always on My Mind" by Pet Shop Boys (1987)
- "If I Could See the World (Through the Eyes of a Child)" by Patsy Cline (1958)

Additionally, in a scene set in Adam's childhood bedroom, he looks at vinyl albums The Circus by Erasure (1987) and Welcome to the Pleasuredome by Frankie Goes to Hollywood (1984). Both bands had openly gay members.

== Release ==
The film premiered at the 50th Telluride Film Festival on 31 August 2023, and played at the 2023 New York Film Festival on 1 October 2023. It also made it to the main competition of the 68th Valladolid International Film Festival. The Cork International Film Festival chose the film as its International Gala film, acting as the Irish premiere, on 19 November 2023. The QCinema International Film Festival hosted three screenings of the film on 19, 20, and 24 November 2023. It began a limited release in the United States on 22 December 2023 and was released in the United Kingdom on 26 January 2024.

== Reception ==
=== Box office ===
In its limited opening weekend, the film made $232,909 from four theatres, a per-venue average of $58,000.

=== Critical response ===
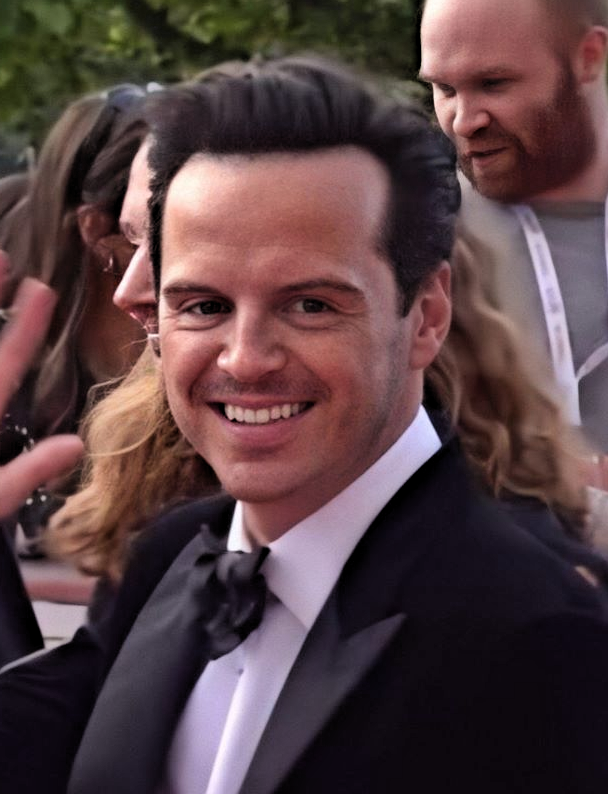
Andrew Scott garnered widespread critical acclaim for his performance in the film.

On the review aggregator website Rotten Tomatoes, 96% of 271 critics' reviews are positive, with an average rating of 8.8/10. The website's consensus reads: "All of Us Strangers examines profound grief and love through a fantastical lens that is always grounded on human emotion." Metacritic, which uses a weighted average, assigned the film a score of 90 out of 100, based on 53 critics, indicating "universal acclaim".

Filmmaker Edgar Wright praised the film, saying "I am in awe of what Andrew [Haigh] managed to do in this film. It's a true testament to his artistry that he was able to make a film so personal, emotional and resonant, yet also so satisfying within its place in a genre. Though a traditional ghost story might end on a note of sadness or shock, the fact that Andrew is able to leave us with a moment of infinite beauty is to be cherished."

In December 2024, Collider ranked the film at number 4 on its list of the "10 Best Fantasy Movies of the 2020s", with Robert Lee III writing that it "has a lot of different moving parts that all seamlessly come together to make for an emotional rollercoaster of tear-jerker moments. From its exploration of the isolation and self-doubt that grief and pain place upon us to the inherent genius of a premise that allows Adam to come out to his parents after a lifetime of never believing he'd get the chance. It's a work of art that can be interpreted in a multitude of different ways, which is one of the greatest strengths that this type of mature fantasy drama can provide."

=== Accolades ===
Award	Date of ceremony	Category	Nominee(s)	Result	Ref.
Chicago International Film Festival	22 October 2023	Gold Q-Hugo	All of Us Strangers	Nominated	
Valladolid International Film Festival	28 October 2023	Golden Spike	All of Us Strangers	Nominated	
Valladolid International Film Festival	28 October 2023	Rainbow Spike	All of Us Strangers	Won	
Montclair Film Festival	29 October 2023	Special Jury Award	Andrew Haigh	Won	
Camerimage	18 November 2023	Golden Frog	Jamie D. Ramsay	Nominated	
Gotham Independent Film Awards	27 November 2023	Best International Feature	All of Us Strangers	Nominated	
Gotham Independent Film Awards	27 November 2023	Best Screenplay	Andrew Haigh	Nominated	
Gotham Independent Film Awards	27 November 2023	Outstanding Lead Performance	Andrew Scott	Nominated	
Gotham Independent Film Awards	27 November 2023	Outstanding Supporting Performance	Claire Foy	Nominated	
British Independent Film Awards	3 December 2023	Best British Independent Film	Andrew Haigh, Graham Broadbent, Peter Czernin, and Sarah Harvey	Won	
British Independent Film Awards	3 December 2023	Best Casting	Kahleen Crawford	Nominated	
British Independent Film Awards	3 December 2023	Best Cinematography	Jamie D. Ramsay	Won	
British Independent Film Awards	3 December 2023	Best Director	Andrew Haigh	Won	
British Independent Film Awards	3 December 2023	Best Editing	Jonathan Alberts	Won	
British Independent Film Awards	3 December 2023	Best Lead Performance	Andrew Scott	Nominated	
British Independent Film Awards	3 December 2023	Best Make-Up & Hair Design	Zoe Clare Brown	Nominated	
British Independent Film Awards	3 December 2023	Best Music Supervision	Connie Farr	Won	
British Independent Film Awards	3 December 2023	Best Production Design	Sarah Finlay	Nominated	
British Independent Film Awards	3 December 2023	Best Screenplay	Andrew Haigh	Won	
British Independent Film Awards	3 December 2023	Best Sound	Joakim Sundström, Per Bostrom, and Stevie Haywood	Nominated	
British Independent Film Awards	3 December 2023	Best Supporting Performance	Jamie Bell	Nominated	
British Independent Film Awards	3 December 2023	Best Supporting Performance	Claire Foy	Nominated	
British Independent Film Awards	3 December 2023	Best Supporting Performance	Paul Mescal	Won	
National Board of Review	6 December 2023	Top 10 Independent Films	All of Us Strangers	Won (Note: This award does not have a single winner but recognizes multiple films.)	
Los Angeles Film Critics Association Awards	10 December 2023	Best Editing	Jonathan Alberts	Runner-up	
Los Angeles Film Critics Association Awards	10 December 2023	Best Leading Performance	Andrew Scott	Runner-up	
Los Angeles Film Critics Association Awards	10 December 2023	Best Screenplay	Andrew Haigh	Won	
IndieWire Critics Poll	11 December 2023	Best Performance	Andrew Scott	8th Place	
Chicago Film Critics Association Awards	12 December 2023	Best Actor	Andrew Scott	Nominated	
Toronto Film Critics Association	17 December 2023	Best Adapted Screenplay	Andrew Haigh	Runner-up (Note: Shared with Tony McNamara for Poor Things.)	
Toronto Film Critics Association	17 December 2023	Best Picture	All of Us Strangers	Runner-up (Note: Shared with Killers of the Flower Moon.)	
Toronto Film Critics Association	17 December 2023	Outstanding Lead Performance	Andrew Scott	Runner-up (Note: Shared with Paul Giamatti for The Holdovers, Emma Stone for Poor Things, and Kôji Yakusho for Perfect Days.)	
Florida Film Critics Circle Awards	21 December 2023	Best Actor	Andrew Scott	Nominated	
Alliance of Women Film Journalists	3 January 2024	Best Actor	Andrew Scott	Nominated	
Greater Western New York Film Critics Association	6 January 2024	Best Adapted Screenplay	Andrew Haigh	Nominated	
Greater Western New York Film Critics Association	6 January 2024	Best Lead Actor	Andrew Scott	Nominated	
Greater Western New York Film Critics Association	6 January 2024	Best Picture	All of Us Strangers	Nominated	
National Society of Film Critics Awards	6 January 2024	Best Actor	Andrew Scott	Won	
Golden Globe Awards	7 January 2024	Best Actor – Motion Picture Drama	Andrew Scott	Nominated	
Seattle Film Critics Society Awards	8 January 2024	Best Actor in a Leading Role	Andrew Scott	Nominated	
San Francisco Bay Area Film Critics Circle Awards	9 January 2024	Best Actor	Andrew Scott	Nominated	
San Francisco Bay Area Film Critics Circle Awards	9 January 2024	Best Adapted Screenplay	Andrew Haigh	Nominated	
Denver Film Critics Society	12 January 2024	Best Adapted Screenplay	Andrew Haigh	Nominated	
Critics' Choice Movie Awards	14 January 2024	Best Adapted Screenplay	Andrew Haigh	Nominated	
Houston Film Critics Society	22 January 2024	Best Actor	Andrew Scott	Nominated	
Kansas City Film Critics Circle	27 January 2024	Tom Poe Award for the Best LBGTQ Film	All of Us Strangers	Won	
London Film Critics' Circle	4 February 2024	Actor of the Year	Andrew Scott	Won	
London Film Critics' Circle	4 February 2024	British/Irish Film of the Year	All of Us Strangers	Won	
London Film Critics' Circle	4 February 2024	British/Irish Performer of the Year	Andrew Scott	Nominated	
London Film Critics' Circle	4 February 2024	British/Irish Performer of the Year	Paul Mescal (also for God’s Creatures, Foe, and Carmen)	Won	
London Film Critics' Circle	4 February 2024	Film of the Year	All of Us Strangers	Nominated	
London Film Critics' Circle	4 February 2024	Screenwriter of the Year	Andrew Haigh	Nominated	
London Film Critics' Circle	4 February 2024	Supporting Actor of the Year	Paul Mescal	Nominated	
London Film Critics' Circle	4 February 2024	Supporting Actress of the Year	Claire Foy	Nominated	
London Film Critics' Circle	4 February 2024	Technical Achievement Award	Kahleen Crawford	Nominated	
AACTA International Awards	10 February 2024	Best Lead Actor in Film	Andrew Scott	Nominated	
British Academy Film Awards	18 February 2024	Best Adapted Screenplay	Andrew Haigh	Nominated	
British Academy Film Awards	18 February 2024	Best Casting	Kahleen Crawford	Nominated	
British Academy Film Awards	18 February 2024	Best Director	Andrew Haigh	Nominated	
British Academy Film Awards	18 February 2024	Best Supporting Actress	Claire Foy	Nominated	
British Academy Film Awards	18 February 2024	Best Supporting Actor	Paul Mescal	Nominated	
British Academy Film Awards	18 February 2024	Outstanding British Film	Andrew Haigh, Graham Broadbent, Pete Czernin, Sarah Harvey	Nominated	
Independent Spirit Awards	25 February 2024	Best Director	Andrew Haigh	Nominated	
Independent Spirit Awards	25 February 2024	Best Film	Graham Broadbent, Pete Czernin, Sarah Harvey	Nominated	
Independent Spirit Awards	25 February 2024	Best Lead Performance	Andrew Scott	Nominated	
Dorian Awards	26 February 2024	Director of the Year	Andrew Haigh	Nominated	
Dorian Awards	26 February 2024	Film of the Year	All of Us Strangers	Won	
Dorian Awards	26 February 2024	Film Performance of the Year	Andrew Scott	Nominated	
Dorian Awards	26 February 2024	GALECA LGBTQIA+ Film Trailblazer Award "For creating art that inspires empathy, truth and equity"	Andrew Haigh	Nominated	
Dorian Awards	26 February 2024	GALECA LGBTQIA+ Film Trailblazer Award "For creating art that inspires empathy, truth and equity"	Andrew Scott	Nominated	
Dorian Awards	26 February 2024	Genre Film of the Year "For excellence in science fiction, fantasy and horror"	All of Us Strangers	Nominated	
Dorian Awards	26 February 2024	LGBTQ Screenplay of the Year	Andrew Haigh	Won	
Dorian Awards	26 February 2024	LGBTQ Film of the Year	All of Us Strangers	Won	
Dorian Awards	26 February 2024	Screenplay of the Year	Andrew Haigh	Nominated	
Dorian Awards	26 February 2024	Supporting Film Performance of the Year	Paul Mescal	Nominated	
Satellite Awards	3 March 2024	Best Actor in a Motion Picture, Drama	Andrew Scott	Nominated	
Satellite Awards	3 March 2024	Best Adapted Screenplay	Andrew Haigh and Taichi Yamada	Nominated	
GLAAD Media Awards	14 March 2024	Outstanding Film – Wide Release	All of Us Strangers	Nominated	
Critics' Choice Super Awards	4 April 2024	Best Actor in a Horror Movie	Andrew Scott	Nominated	
