= Emilie Levienaise-Farrouch =

French pianist and composer

- Born: Paris, France
- Education: University of Westminster; Goldsmiths, University of London
- Years active: 2009–present
- Website: emilielf.com

Emilie Levienaise-Farrouch (French: [emili ləvjenɛz faʁuʃ]) is a French pianist and composer based in London. She signed with FatCat Records' post-classical imprint 130701 in 2014 and Manners McDade in 2019. Her original score for Sarah Gavron's Rocks (2019) was nominated for a British Independent Film Award.

== Early life ==
Levienaise-Farrouch was born in Paris and grew up in Bordeaux. She began training in classical piano as a child. She graduated with a Bachelor of Arts (BA) in Music from the University of Westminster in 2009 and a Master of Music (MA) in Acoustic Composition from Goldsmiths, University of London in 2010. During her studies, she worked for the online electronic music store Bleep. She got her start creating scores when she met film school students who needed music for their student films.

== Discography ==
=== Albums and EPs ===
Title	Details
Like Water Through the Sand	Released: November 2015 Label: 130701
Époques	Released: July 2018 Label: 130701
Only You (EP)	Released: July 2019 Label: 130701
Ravage	Released: May 2022 Label: 130701

=== Commissions ===
- Audial for 2014 Victoria & Albert Museum exhibit
- "The Flaneur" for Queen Elizabeth Olympic Park
- Audial for Alice May Williams' exhibit at Speke Hall
- "The Minutes" for the 2017 BBC Proms
- "Oparin" for violinist Galya Bisengalieva

== Filmography ==
=== Film ===
Year	Title	Director	Notes
2012	The Sheik and I	Caveh Zahedi	Documentary
2014	Tiger Orange	Wade Gasque	
2015	Art Ache	Berty Cadilhac	
2018	Only You	Harry Wootliff	
2019	Rocks	Sarah Gavron	
2020	The Forgotten Battle	Matthijs van Heijningen Jr.	
2021	Censor	Prano Bailey-Bond	
2022	Living	Oliver Hermanus	
2023	The Strays	Nathaniel Martello-White	
2023	All of Us Strangers	Andrew Haigh	
2024	The Assessment	Fleur Fortuné	
2024	Georgia O'Keeffe: The Brightness of Light	Paul Wagner	Documentary
2025	Late Shift (Heldin)	Petra Volpe	
2025	H is for Hawk	Philippa Lowthorpe	

=== Television ===
Year	Title	Notes
2023	Maternal	
2024–present	The Agency	

== Awards and nominations ==
Year	Award	Category	Work	Result	Ref.
2020	British Independent Film Awards	Best Music	Rocks	Nominated	(Note: Shared with Connie Farr.)
2022	Ivor Novello Awards	Best Original Film Score	Censor	Nominated	
2022	Hollywood Music in Media Awards	Best Original Score in an Independent Film	Living	Won	
