= Mariko Kaga =

Japanese actress (born 1943)

- 加賀まりこ
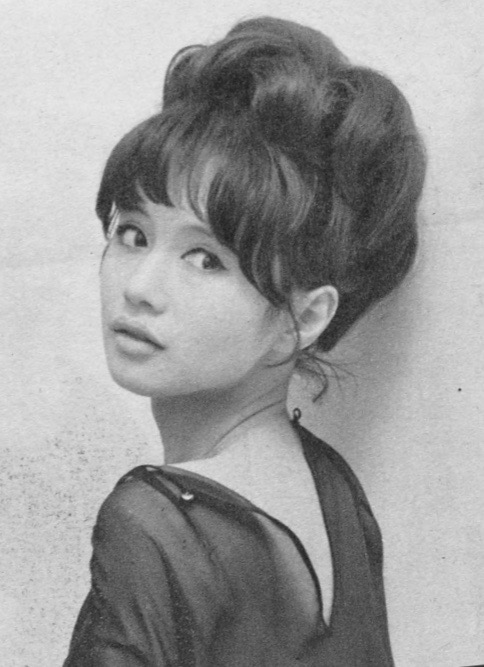
- Kaga in 1964
- Born: Masako Kaga; 11 December 1943 (age 82); Kanda-Ogawamachi, Chiyoda-ku, Tokyo, Japan
- Occupation: Actor
- Years active: 1962–present

Mariko Kaga (Japanese: 加賀まりこ, Hepburn: Kaga Mariko; born December 11, 1943) is a Japanese actress.

== Career ==
Scouted in Shibuya, Kaga starred in the television drama Yonjū hassai no teikō in 1962. She became known for playing femme fatale characters in films such as Pale Flower and Getsuyōbi no Yuka. She was given the Kinuyo Tanaka Award at the Mainichi Film Awards in 2014 for her career in film.

== Selected filmography ==
=== Film ===
- A Flame at the Pier (1962)
- A Legend or Was It? (1963)
- Pale Flower (1964)
- Getsuyōbi no Yuka (1964)
- With Beauty and Sorrow (1965)
- Silence Has No Wings (1966)
- Yūgure made (1980)
- Muddy River (1981)
- Love Letter (1981)
- Dotonbori River (1982)
- The Gate of Youth: Part 2 (1982)
- Haru no Kane (1985)
- Chōchin (1987)
- Oracion (1988)
- Tobu yume o shibaraku minai (1990)
- Love Letter (1995), Yasuyo Fujii
- Hana Yori Dango Final (2008)
- Patisserie Coin de rue (2011)
- In His Chart (2011)
- The Lone Ume Tree (2021)

=== Television ===
- Yonjū hassai no teikō (1962)
- Asunaro Hakusho (1993)
- Toshiie and Matsu (2002), Tatsu
- Hana Yori Dango (2005)
- Hana Yori Dango Returns (2007)
- Gō (2011), Lady Ōba
- From Five to Nine (2015)
- Superstar Minami Is My Boyfriend!? (2024), Yuriko
- Shiawase wa Tabete Nete Mate (2025), Suzu Miyama
- Blossom (2026–27), old Tama Hano
