= Masafumi Kimura =

Japanese voice actor (born 1977)

- Born: March 3, 1977 (age 49); Aomori Prefecture, Japan
- Height: 185 cm (6 ft 1 in)

Masafumi Kimura (木村 雅史, Kimura Masafumi; born March 3, 1977) is a Japanese voice actor from Aomori Prefecture. He currently works at Production Baobab.

== Filmography ==
=== Television animation ===
- Inuyasha (2004) (Nezumi Zushi)
- Bleach (2009) (Tenken, Seizo Harugasaki)
- Super Dragon Ball Heroes (2020) (Dr. W)

==== Unknown date ====
- Case Closed (Detective, Mamehara, referee, shop assistant, judge B, Detective Yamade, Nezumi's comrade)
- Chrono Crusade (Vido)
- Crayon Shin-chan (Gasoline stand employee)
- D.Gray-man (Charles)
- Digimon Adventure (Whamon)
- Digimon Adventure 02 (Ken's father)
- Digimon Data Squad (Jureimon)
- Digimon Tamers (Vikaralamon, Jijimon)
- Fairy Tail (Crux, Yajima, Olga Nanagia, Crawford Theme)
- Fresh Pretty Cure! (Tadashi Yamabuki)
- Kamikaze Kaito Jeanne (Detective Haruta)
- Kindaichi Case Files (Detective Shōno, student)
- Maho Girls PreCure! (Gustav)
- Mob Psycho 100 II (Prime Minister Hiroshi Yabe)
- Naruto Shippuden (Tenzen Daikoku, Kitsuchi, Jomae Village Leader)
- Nintama Rantarō (Snow ogre, others)
- One Piece (Gotti, Charlotte Oven)
- Otogi-Jūshi Akazukin (Juntarō Suzukaze)
- Phoenix (Soldier)
- Power Stone (Galuda)
- Samurai 7 (Gonzo)
- Scrapped Princess (Drake)
- Soul Eater (Sid Barrett)
- Superman: The Animated Series (Orion)
- Transformers: Cybertron (Megalo Convoy, Dino Snout, Road Storm)
- Transformers: Robots in Disguise (Terrashock)
- Toaru Majutsu no Index II (The Pope)
- Voltron Legendary Defender (Zarkon)

=== Theatrical animation ===
- Crayon Shin-chan: Honeymoon Hurricane ~The Lost Hiroshi~ (2019) (Hobakura)

=== Video games ===
- Crash Nitro Kart (2003, Japanese dub) (Tiny Tiger)
- Crash Tag Team Racing (2005, Japanese dub) (Crunch Bandicoot)
- League of Legends (2010) (Olaf)
- Ace Combat 7: Skies Unknown (2019) (Champ, Édouard Labarthe)
- The King of Fighters: All Star (2019) (Igniz)
- Guilty Gear -STRIVE- (2021) (Goldlewis Dickinson)
- Dragon Force (xxxx) (Gordack)
- God of War II (xxxx) (Typhon, Barbarian King)
- Sakura Wars V ~Saraba, Itoshiki Hito yo~ (xxxx) (Caluross)
- Tales of the Abyss (xxxx) (Tritheim)
- Tom Clancy's Rainbow Six: Vegas 2 (xxxx) (Domingo "Ding" Chavez)

=== Dubbing roles ===
==== Live-action ====
- Dean Norris
  - The One (Sgt. Siegel)
  - Breaking Bad (Hank Schrader)
  - Remember (John Kurlander)
  - Secret in Their Eyes (Bumpy Willis)
  - Death Wish (Detective Leonore Jackson)
- 12 Rounds (George Aiken (Steve Harris))
- 13 Hours: The Secret Soldiers of Benghazi (Dave Benton (David Denman))
- 2 Fast 2 Furious (Enrique (Mo Gallini))
- Agora (Theon of Alexandria (Michael Lonsdale))
- Alita: Battle Angel (Grewishka (Jackie Earle Haley))
- Assassination Games (Polo Yakur (Ivan Kaye))
- Batman Begins (2007 NTV edition) (Joe Chill (Richard Brake))
- The Bay (Bill Bradwell (James Cosmo))
- Black Beauty (Terry (Hakeem Kae-Kazim))
- Blade Runner 2049 (Sapper Morton (Dave Bautista))
- Border (aka Desert Force) (Wing Commander Umar Shariff (Jackie Shroff))
- Chef (Carl Casper (Jon Favreau))
- Dark Kingdom: The Dragon King (Eyvind (Max von Sydow))
- Deadpool (Colossus)
- Debug (Iam (Jason Momoa))
- Dirty (Officer Salim Adel (Cuba Gooding Jr.))
- Doctor Sleep (Grandpa Flick (Carel Struycken))
- ER (Brandon Kirk)
- Escape Plan (Drake (Vinnie Jones))
- Fifty Shades of Grey (Jason Taylor (Max Martini))
- Fifty Shades Freed (Jason Taylor (Max Martini))
- Final Destination 2 (Detective Suby (Eric Keenleyside), Mr. Gibbons (Alf Humphreys))
- Fires (Doug (Sullivan Stapleton))
- Ford v Ferrari (Enzo Ferrari (Remo Girone))
- Game of Thrones (Benjen Stark (Joseph Mawle), Khal Drogo (Jason Momoa))
- The Godfather (2008 Blu-Ray edition) (Bruno Tattaglia (Tony Giorgio), Don Tommasino (Corrado Gaipa))
- Hart's War (Corporal Joe S. Cromin (Scott Michael Campbell))
- Hellboy (Ben Daimio (Daniel Dae Kim))
- I Am Legend (2010 TV Asahi edition) (The President of the United States (Pat Fraley))
- In the Light of the Moon (Ed Gein (Steve Railsback))
- Inception (Yusuf (Dileep Rao))
- The Invention of Lying (Jim the Bartender (Philip Seymour Hoffman))
- Kings of South Beach (Allie Boy (Steven Bauer))
- The Legend of the Condor Heroes (Jebe)
- The Libertine (Charles Sackville (Johnny Vegas))
- Mackenna's Gold (The Editor (Lee J. Cobb))
- Mission: Impossible 2 (2006 TV Asahi edition) (Doctor Nekhorvich (Rade Šerbedžija))
- Narc (Elvin Dowd)
- O Brother, Where Art Thou? (Junior)
- On Her Majesty's Secret Service (Grunther (Yuri Borienko)) (DVD/Blu-Ray release)
- Paparazzi (Kevin Rosner (Kevin Gage))
- Piege (Murat (Laurent Lucas))
- Pixels (President Will Cooper (Kevin James))
- Quarantine (Danny Wilensky (Columbus Short))
- The Quiet Ones (Professor Joseph Coupland (Jared Harris))
- Red One (Krampus (Kristofer Hivju))
- Repo Men (Jake Freivald (Forest Whitaker))
- Roboshark (Admiral Black)
- The Rookie (Wade Grey (Richard T. Jones))
- Saw 3D (Rogers (Laurence Anthony))
- She Said (Dean Baquet (Andre Braugher))
- Superbad (Officer Michaels (Seth Rogen))
- The Twilight Zone (Host (Forest Whitaker))
- Unthinkable (Charles Thomson (Stephen Root))
- Vantage Point (Howard Lewis (Forest Whitaker))
- Warrior (Father Jun (Perry Yung))
- Wind River (Ben Shoyo (Graham Greene))

==== Animation ====
- The Sea Beast (Captain Crow (Jared Harris))
