= The North Water (TV series) =

British TV series

- Genre: Drama; Mystery
- Created by: Andrew Haigh
- Based on: The North Water by Ian McGuire
- Written by: Andrew Haigh
- Directed by: Andrew Haigh
- Starring: Colin Farrell; Jack O'Connell; Stephen Graham; Tom Courtenay; Peter Mullan
- Composer: Tim Hecker
- Countries of origin: United Kingdom; Canada
- Original language: English
- No. of episodes: 5

Production
- Executive producers: Iain Canning; Niv Fichman; Andrew Haigh; Hakan Kousetta; Jamie Laurenson; Jo McClellan; Emile Sherman
- Producer: Kate Ogborn
- Cinematography: Nicolas Bolduc
- Editors: Jonathan Alberts; Matthew Hannam
- Running time: 60 minutes
- Production companies: See-Saw Films; Rhombus Media

Original release
- Network: BBC Two (United Kingdom); Super Channel Fuse and CBC Television/ICI Radio-Canada Télé (Canada)
- Release: July 15 – August 12, 2021

The North Water is a 2021 five-part television historical drama based on Ian McGuire's 2016 novel of the same name written and directed by Andrew Haigh and starring Colin Farrell and Jack O'Connell. An international co-production between British public broadcaster BBC, and Canadian English-language public broadcaster CBC Television, in association with Canadian premium television channel Super Channel and CBC Television's French-language counterpart ICI Radio-Canada Télé, the series first premiered in the United States on AMC+ on 15 July 2021 before premiering in the United Kingdom on BBC Two on 10 September 2021 and in Canada on Super Channel Fuse a week later on 19 September, followed by a nationwide broadcast in the country on CBC Television in English and ICI Radio-Canada Télé in French, with video on demand availability on the CBC Gem and ICI TOU.TV services in both respective languages.

== Premise ==
The series is set in the year 1859, the final years of the whale oil trade, on a whaling expedition in the Arctic Ocean. The aging whaler Volunteer includes among its crew one Patrick Sumner, the ship's surgeon who hides his dark past as a disgraced military officer, and Henry Drax, the ship's chief harpooner and coxswain who is also a murderous thug and rapist. As well as whaling, the series depicts the slaughter of seals, and acts of rape and murder aboard the ship. The ship's captain, Brownlee, is revealed to be secretly plotting to sink the Volunteer so the owner can commit insurance fraud, but the scheme falters when the ship that was supposed to rescue the crew fails to reach them in time before the winter frosts make sea travel impossible. As the men die one by one, Sumner is forced to battle not only the elements, but also the vicious and mentally unstable Drax.

== Cast ==
- Jack O'Connell as Patrick Sumner
- Colin Farrell as Henry Drax
- Stephen Graham as Captain Arthur Brownlee
- Tom Courtenay as Baxter
- Sam Spruell as Michael Cavendish
- Peter Mullan as the Priest
- Roland Møller as Otto
- Kieran Urquhart as Jones
- Philip Hill-Pearson as McKendrick
- Nive Nielsen as Anna
- Jonathan Aris as Corbyn
- Lee Knight as Stevens
- Gary Lamont as Webster
- Eliza Butterworth as Hester
- Mark Rowley as Bain
- Keenan Carpenter as Merok
- Stephen McMillan as Joseph Hannah
- Rishi Kuppa as Gaurav

== Episodes ==
No.	Title	Directed by	Written by	Original release date
1	"Behold the Man"	Andrew Haigh	Andrew Haigh	July 15, 2021
In Hull, 1859, Patrick Sumner, a cashiered Irish army surgeon boards the whaling ship Volunteer as its ship's surgeon under Captain Brownlee. He becomes acquainted with the rest of the crew, including the vulgar first mate Cavendish, the friendly and ambitious second mate Jones, and the master harpooners Otto, a pious Dane, and the thuggish Henry Drax, who has already murdered and robbed a man before leaving Hull. Working with the ship's owner Baxter in an insurance scam, Brownlee plans to sink the Volunteer in northern waters, with the crew being rescued by a nearby ship, the Hastings. Drax and Cavendish, who are both complicit in Baxter's scheme, discover Sumner is in possession of a valuable ring from the spoils of his time in India, and plan to kill him to sell the ring off. During a sealing expedition, in which Sumner participates, Drax leaves the surgeon behind across an ice floe; Sumner attempts to jump across but falls in the icy waters.
2	"We Men Are Wretched Things"	Andrew Haigh	Andrew Haigh	July 22, 2021
Sumner manages to crawl out of the water, is found by Jones, and recovers from frostbite on the Volunteer, which proceeds to head farther north. The whalers, led by Drax, catch and kill their first whale. After his recovery, Sumner is visited by cabin boy Joseph Hannah, who complains about a stomach ache; upon examination Sumner discovers Hannah has been sodomised and has venereal disease. Reporting it to Brownlee, the captain becomes determined to find the culprit, but Hannah refuses to name his assailant out of fear. Hannah is later found dead in an oil barrel, having been strangled and missing part of his front tooth. Suspicions fall on carpenter McKendrick after Drax gives an account of seeing him and Hannah together. Sumner examines McKendrick, who admits to being homosexual but says that he is not interested in boys, finds that he does not have venereal disease, and believes that he is innocent. McKendrick is imprisoned, and Sumner begins to suspect Drax.
3	"Homo Homini Lupus"	Andrew Haigh	Andrew Haigh	July 29, 2021
With the Hastings nearby, the Volunteer continues farther into ice fields. Sumner believes that McKendrick is innocent due to a hand injury that would have made it impossible for him to strangle Hannah. Brownlee is unmoved, but allows Sumner to examine Drax, who is also found to be free of venereal disease. However, Brownlee notices an abscess on Drax's arm, and, when Sumner examines it, he discovers part of a tooth embedded in the wound. Unmasked as the murderer, Drax bludgeons Brownlee with a whalebone cane. Jones saves Sumner by threatening Drax with a rifle; Drax is imprisoned and McKendrick set free. Brownlee dies from a fractured skull and Cavendish takes command. Colliding the ship with an ice floe, Cavendish purposely holes the Volunteer, which has survived the collision, with indirect assistance from Drax. The crew abandon the ship, with a small group, consisting of Cavendish, Sumner, Otto, McKendrick, a chained Drax and two other men, remaining with the sinking ship, and the rest, under Jones, travelling to the Hastings. The Volunteer sinks and that night there is a bad storm, after which the Hastings is nowhere to be seen. Rowing in search of it, the group discover it has been lost in the storm with all hands, including those from the Volunteer. Sumner's background is also revealed; he and other surgeons were ordered by a senior officer, Corbyn, to abandon their posts to steal valuables from the home of a wealthy Indian during the Siege of Delhi. After the party was ambushed, Sumner, wounded in the leg, was the only survivor. However, Corbyn denied any knowledge of the operation, and Sumner was court-martialed dishonorably, which left him unable to obtain work as a surgeon in civilian life, thus forcing him to take the relatively low-paid job aboard the Volunteer.
4	"The Devils of the Earth"	Andrew Haigh	Andrew Haigh	August 5, 2021
Having made camp on a small frozen island, the group tenuously led by Cavendish attempts to survive the winter on meagre rations. Two Inuit men arrive on the island in kayaks, and Cavendish trades a rifle for seal meat to eat. The Inuit pair stay with the group for a while, and Drax secretly builds a rapport with them. When the surrounding sea begins to freeze, the Inuit pair decide to leave, despite the protests of Cavendish. Sumner persuades one of them to stay for longer so a supply of meat is maintained in exchange for the ring. Drax informs Cavendish that he has agreed passage with the two Inuit and that he only needs to set him free. Cavendish attempts to bargain escape from the island as well, and Drax agrees. The next morning, Drax kills the two Inuit and then slits Cavendish's throat, taking the last whaleboat. With the island frozen in, the remaining men, apart from Otto and Sumner, depart the island in a doomed attempt to find a ship or camp. With winter setting in, Sumner and Otto become desperate and use the corpses of the Inuit to attract a polar bear for food. When one arrives, Sumner wounds and follows it, leaving Otto back at the camp. Trekking many miles, Sumner eventually becomes caught in a storm and finally kills the bear after hallucinating it as Drax. He eviscerates the bear and shelters in its carcass, before eventually being rescued by an Inuk and taken to a cabin inhabited by a Scottish Catholic priest and his Inuit housekeeper Anna.
5	"To Live Is To Suffer"	Andrew Haigh	Andrew Haigh	August 12, 2021
The priest takes care of Sumner, explaining that he has spent many months as a missionary to the Inuit, attempting to convert them. The Inuit hunters nearby believe that Sumner has special powers after finding him "reborn" from the polar bear, and he joins them on a seal hunt. Afterwards, they present him with a knife and necklace both adorned with a carving of a bear. Sumner saves the priest's life by operating on him to remove an abscess of the caecum. Five months later, Sumner returns to Hull and meets Baxter, who pays his wages and says he will ask a surgeon friend of his in London to help him set up in practice. Sumner is determined to bring Drax to justice but Baxter dissuades him. In fact, Drax has been staying in Baxter's attic and, suspecting that he knows about the insurance scam, the pair scheme to kill Sumner. Baxter sends his servant Stevens to bring Sumner to a warehouse where Drax will murder him, and, on Baxter's instructions, Stevens will then kill Drax to eliminate loose ends. When Sumner is brought, a drunken Drax accidentally shoots Stevens, but discovers Baxter was double-crossing him. Sumner and Drax fight, culminating in Sumner fatally stabbing Drax in the jugular with his knife. Returning to Baxter, Sumner confirms his suspicions of Baxter's involvement in the scuttling and murders, and robs and kills him. A year later in Berlin, Sumner visits the zoo and, watching an emaciated polar bear in a cage, reminisces about his adventures aboard the Volunteer.

== Production ==
The series first began development in late 2016. Canadian public broadcaster CBC/Radio-Canada and premium television channel Super Channel joined on board as co-producers of the series.

It was announced in February 2019 that Colin Farrell had been cast to star in the miniseries. Jack O'Connell was added in April. with Stephen Graham, Tom Courtenay and Peter Mullan amongst additional cast announced. Filming of the drama started in October 2019, in Hungary and on the Norwegian archipelago of Svalbard (Spitzbergen), with the production team journeying north as far as 81 degrees (north latitude, close to the Arctic Circle) to shoot pack ice sequences, which is purported to be the farthest point north any television drama has ever been filmed.

In May 2019, Canadian composer and sound artist Tim Hecker announced that he had been hired as the show's composer.

In March 2020, filming had to be paused when quite close to wrapping, due to the COVID-19 pandemic. The remaining four days of filming were completed at a later date, at a studio in the United Kingdom.

== Reception ==
The North Water has received positive reviews from critics. On Rotten Tomatoes, the series holds an approval rating of 95% based on 19 critic reviews, with an average rating of 7.40/10. The website's critical consensus reads, "The North Water's story doesn't always hold together, but its brooding atmosphere and strong performances from Jack O'Connell and Colin Farrell keep it afloat." On Metacritic, it has a score of 74 out of 100 based on 13 critics, indicating "generally favourable reviews".

The series received a Canadian Screen Award nomination for Best Dramatic Series at the 10th Canadian Screen Awards in 2022.

== See also ==
- The Terror (2018), a TV series set aboard a ship stranded in the Arctic pack ice during the Franklin expedition of 1846
