= Taichi Yamada =

Japanese writer (1934–2023)

Taichi Yamada (山田 太一, Yamada Taichi; 6 June 1934 – 29 November 2023) was a Japanese screenwriter and novelist. His real name was Taichi Ishizaka (石坂 太一, Ishizaka Taichi).

== Early life ==
Yamada was born in Asakusa, Tokyo, a setting used in his novel Ijintachi to no natsu. He attended Waseda University before entering the Shōchiku film studios, where he trained as an assistant director under Keisuke Kinoshita.

== Scriptwriting career ==
Yamada left the company at age 30 to focus on writing scripts for television dramas, penning such successful series as Kishibe no arubamu and Fuzoroi no ringotachi. He also wrote scripts for film and the stage.

== Novelist career and adaptations ==
As a novelist, his novel Ijintachi to no natsu (異人たちとの夏), published in 1987, won the Yamamoto Shūgorō Prize. It was translated into English, in 2003, as Strangers. Another Yamada novel, In Search of a Distant Voice, was translated and published in 2006 from a novel originally published in Japan in 1989. A third Yamada novel, I Haven't Dreamed of Flying for a While (飛ぶ夢をしばらく見ない, Tobu yume o shibaraku minai) was translated into English and published in 2008.

The first film adaptation of Strangers, The Discarnates, competed for the Golden St. George at the 16th Moscow International Film Festival in July 1989 and won other select film awards. The second film adaptation, All of Us Strangers, premiered at Telluride Film Festival in August 2023 and also went on to be nominated for and win many film awards.

Tobu yume o shibaraku minai was adapted into a 1990 film of the same name by director Eizō Sugawa, who also wrote the screenplay. It was nominated for several awards, winning the Japan Academy Award for Best Supporting Actress for Eri Ishida's performance, as well as the Golden Raven for Best Film at the 1991 Brussels International Fantastic Film Festival.

== Death ==
Yamada died on 29 November 2023, at the age of 89.

== Selected works ==
=== Television ===
- Kishibe no arubamu (1977)
- Omoide Zukuri (1981)
- Fuzoroi no ringotachi (1983)
- Fuzoroi no ringotachi II (1985)
- Fuzoroi no ringotachi III (1991)
- Fuzoroi no ringotachi IV (1997)

=== Film ===
- Children of Nagasaki (この子を残して, Kono ko o nokoshite) (Keisuke Kinoshita) (1983)
- Final Take (キネマの天地, Kinema no Tenchi) (Yoji Yamada) (1986)
- The Discarnates (異人たちとの夏, Ijin Tachi to no Natsu) (Nobuhiko Obayashi) (1988)
- Childhood Days (少年時代, Shōnen jidai) (Masahiro Shinoda) (1990)
- I Haven't Dreamed of Flying for a While (飛ぶ夢をしばらく見ない, Tobu yume o shibaraku minai) (Eizō Sugawa) (1990)
- All of Us Strangers (Andrew Haigh) (2023)

=== Literature ===
- I Haven't Dreamed of Flying for a While (飛ぶ夢をしばらく見ない, Tobu yume o shibaraku minai) (1985)
- Strangers (異人たちとの夏, Ijintachi to no natsu) (1987)
- In Search of a Distant Voice (遠くの声を捜して, Toku no koe wo sagashite) (1989)
