= Japan Academy Film Prize for Director of the Year =

- Awarded for: Excellence in directing films of Japan
- Country: Japan
- Presented by: Japan Academy Film Prize Association
- First award: 1978
- Website: http://www.japan-academy-prize.jp/

The Director of the Year (最優秀監督賞) of the Japan Academy Film Prize is one of the annual Awards given by the Japan Academy Film Prize Association.

== List of winners ==
Nr.	Year	Name (English)	Name (Japanese)	Movie (English)	Movie (Japanese)
1	1978	Yoji Yamada	山田洋次	The Yellow Handkerchief; Otoko wa Tsurai yo	幸福の黄色いハンカチ 男はつらいよ
2	1979	Yoshitarō Nomura	野村芳太郎	The Incident; The Demon	事件 鬼畜
3	1980	Shōhei Imamura	今村昌平	Vengeance Is Mine	復讐するは我にあり
4	1981	Seijun Suzuki	鈴木清順	Zigeunerweisen	ツィゴイネルワイゼン
5	1982	Kōhei Oguri	小栗康平	Muddy River	泥の河
6	1983	Kinji Fukasaku	深作欣二	Fall Guy; Dotonbori River	蒲田行進曲 道頓堀川
7	1984	Hideo Gosha	五社英雄	The Geisha	陽暉楼
8	1985	Juzo Itami	伊丹十三	The Funeral	お葬式
9	1986	Shinichiro Sawai	澤井信一郎	Early Spring Story; W's Tragedy	早春物語; Wの悲劇
10	1987	Kinji Fukasaku	深作欣二	House on Fire	火宅の人
11	1988	Juzo Itami	伊丹十三	A Taxing Woman	マルサの女
12	1989	Junya Sato	佐藤純彌	The Silk Road	敦煌
13	1990	Shōhei Imamura	今村昌平	Black Rain	黒い雨
14	1991	Masahiro Shinoda	篠田正浩	Childhood Days	少年時代
15	1992	Kihachi Okamoto	岡本喜八	Rainbow Kids	大誘拐
16	1993	Masayuki Suo	周防正行	Sumo Do, Sumo Don't	シコふんじゃった。
17	1994	Yoji Yamada	山田洋次	Otoko wa Tsurai yo A Class to Remember	男はつらいよ 寅次郎の縁談 学校
18	1995	Kinji Fukasaku	深作欣二	Crest of Betrayal	忠臣蔵外伝 四谷怪談
19	1996	Kaneto Shindo	新藤兼人	A Last Note	午後の遺言状
20	1997	Masayuki Suo	周防正行	Shall We Dance?	Shall we ダンス?
21	1998	Shōhei Imamura	今村昌平	The Eel	うなぎ
22	1999	Hideyuki Hirayama	平山秀幸	Begging for Love	愛を乞うひと
23	2000	Yasuo Furuhata	降旗康男	Poppoya	鉄道員
24	2001	Junji Sakamoto	阪本順治	Face	顔
25	2002	Isao Yukisada	行定勲	Go	GO
26	2003	Yoji Yamada	山田洋次	The Twilight Samurai	たそがれ清兵衛
27	2004	Yoshimitsu Morita	森田芳光	Like Asura	阿修羅のごとく
28	2005	Yoichi Sai	崔洋一	Blood and Bones	血と骨
29	2006	Takashi Yamazaki	山崎貴	Always Sanchōme no Yūhi	ALWAYS 三丁目の夕日
30	2007	Lee Sang-il	李相日	Hula Girls	フラガール
31	2008	Joji Matsuoka	松岡錠司	Tokyo Tower: Mom and Me, and Sometimes Dad	東京タワー 〜オカンとボクと、時々、オトン〜
32	2009	Yōjirō Takita	滝田洋二郎	Departures	おくりびと
33	2010	Daisaku Kimura	木村大作	Mt. Tsurugidake	劒岳 点の記
34	2011	Tetsuya Nakashima	中島哲也	Confessions	告白
35	2012	Izuru Narushima	成島出	Rebirth	八日目の蝉
36	2013	Daihachi Yoshida	吉田大八	The Kirishima Thing	桐島、部活やめるってよ
37	2014	Yuya Ishii	石井裕也	The Great Passage	舟を編む
38	2015	Takashi Yamazaki	山崎貴	The Eternal Zero	永遠の0
39	2016	Hirokazu Kore-eda	是枝裕和	Our Little Sister	海街diary
40	2017	Hideaki Anno and Shinji Higuchi	庵野秀明, 樋口真嗣	Shin Godzilla	シン・ゴジラ
41	2018	Hirokazu Kore-eda	是枝裕和	The Third Murder	三度目の殺人
42	2019	Hirokazu Kore-eda	是枝裕和	Shoplifters	万引き家族
43	2020	Hideki Takeuchi	武内英樹	Fly Me to the Saitama	翔んで埼玉
44	2021	Setsurō Wakamatsu	若松節朗	Fukushima 50	Fukushima 50
45	2022	Ryusuke Hamaguchi	濱口竜介	Drive My Car	ドライブ・マイ・カー
46	2023	Kei Ishikawa	石川慶	A Man	ある男
47	2024	Wim Wenders	—N/a	Perfect Days	PERFECT DAYS
48	2025	Michihito Fujii	藤井道人	Faceless	正体
49	2026	Lee Sang-il	李相日	Kokuho	国宝
