= Kōhei Oguri =

Japanese film director and screenwriter (born 1945)

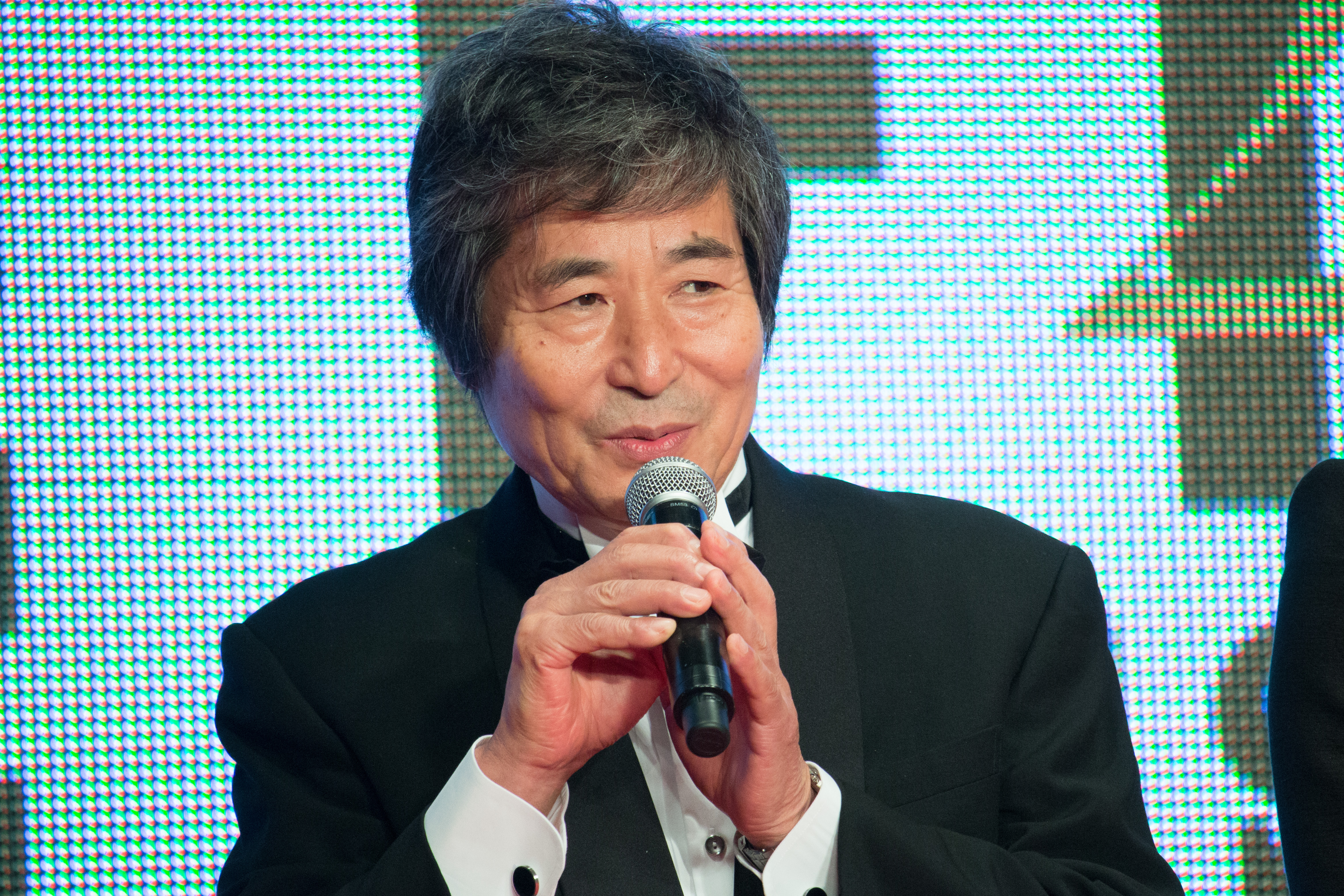
- Born: October 29, 1945 (age 80); Maebashi, Gunma, Japan
- Occupation: Film director

Kōhei Oguri (小栗康平, Oguri Kōhei; born October 29, 1945 in Maebashi, Gunma, Japan) is a Japanese film director and screenwriter.

== Career ==
Born in Gunma, Oguri first became a freelance assistant director after graduating from Waseda University. He made his directorial debut in 1981 with Muddy River, which earned him both a Japan Academy Prize for Director of the Year and a citation in the Directors Guild of Japan New Directors Award. Muddy River was also nominated for the Academy Award for Best Foreign Language Film and won the Silver Prize at the 12th Moscow International Film Festival. In 1985 he was a member of the jury at the 14th Moscow International Film Festival.

His film The Sting of Death won the Grand Prize of the Jury at the 1990 Cannes Film Festival. He has also authored several books.

== Filmography ==
- Muddy River (泥の河, Doro no kawa) (1981)
- Kayako no tame ni (伽倻子のために) (1984)
- The Sting of Death (死の棘, Shi no toge) (1990)
- Sleeping Man (眠る男) (1996)
- Umoregi (埋もれ木) (2005)
- Foujita (藤田) (2015)
