= Andrew Haigh =

English filmmaker

- Haigh at the 2026 New York Film Festival
- Born: 7 March 1973 (age 53); Harrogate, England
- Occupation: Filmmaker
- Years active: 1996–present
- Spouse: Andy Morwood
- Children: 2
- Website: andrewhaighfilm.com

Andrew Haigh (/heɪɡ/; born 7 March 1973) is an English filmmaker. He is best known for writing and directing the films Weekend (2011), 45 Years (2015), Lean on Pete (2017), and All of Us Strangers (2023). He also wrote and directed the HBO series Looking (2014–2015) and its film sequel Looking: The Movie (2016), as well as the BBC Two limited series The North Water (2021).

== Early life ==
Haigh was born in Harrogate on 7 March 1973 and grew up in Croydon. He studied history at Newcastle University.

== Career ==
Haigh worked as an assistant editor on films such as Gladiator and Black Hawk Down before debuting as a writer/director with the short film Oil. In 2009 he directed his first feature-length film, Greek Pete, which debuted at the London Lesbian and Gay Film Festival. The film is set in London and centers on male prostitution, chronicling a year in the life of rent-boy Pete. Greek Pete won the Artistic Achievement Award at Outfest in 2009.

Haigh's second feature, the romantic drama Weekend about a 48-hour relationship between two men (played by Tom Cullen and Chris New), premiered on 11 March 2011 at the SXSW Film Festival, where it won the Audience Award for Emerging Visions. The film played in many other festivals around the world, and went on to collect many more awards including the Grand Jury Award for Outstanding International Narrative Feature at L.A. Outfest and London Film Critics' Circle award for Breakthrough British Filmmaker.

Haigh's next film 45 Years (2015) premiered as part of the main competition at the 65th Berlin International Film Festival. It won the top acting prizes at the festival for both its leads, Charlotte Rampling and Tom Courtenay. The film screened at the Telluride and Toronto film festivals in September 2015. The film later received an Academy Award nomination for Charlotte Rampling. Upon release, it received positive reviews, holding a 97% rating on Rotten Tomatoes. Kate Taylor of The Globe and Mail wrote: "45 Years exposes the paradoxical balance of the successful marriage, one that requires a sentimental suspension of disbelief on the one hand and a hard-headed ability to deal with the everyday on the other."

Haigh co-created, co-produced and occasionally wrote and directed the HBO drama series Looking (2014–2016), about a group of gay men in San Francisco, which struggled to attract audiences despite receiving generally positive reviews from critics. Cancelled after two seasons, the series finished with a two-hour TV movie in 2016. Haigh's next film, Lean on Pete, based on the Willy Vlautin novel about a teenage boy in Oregon, premiered at the 74th Venice International Film Festival in 2017. It was released in cinemas and on VOD in April–May 2018 and received critical acclaim. In October 2016, Haigh was announced as the writer-director of The North Water, a mini-series based on the novel of the same name by Ian McGuire. Filming began in summer 2018. After some filming delays in March 2020 due to the COVID-19 pandemic, it was released between 15 July and 12 August on BBC Two in 2021.

In 2023, Haigh returned to film directing the romance drama All of Us Strangers starring Andrew Scott and Paul Mescal. The film is an adaptation of the Taichi Yamada novel Strangers (1988). The film premiered at the 50th Telluride Film Festival to critical acclaim and was distributed by Searchlight Pictures. The film also screened across the UK as a part of the BFI London Film Festival and is set to appear at the New York Film Festival on 16 October 2023. Peter Debruge of Variety praised the film writing, "Haigh brings a sense of intimacy to this movie, presenting us with characters who are willing to be vulnerable to partners they barely know. It’s sexy, of course, but also quite moving, as this kind of exposed honesty feels like the foundation for any relationship".

In 2024, Haigh directed a music video for the Pet Shop Boys song "A New Bohemia". Filmed in Margate, the video features Tracey Emin and Russell Tovey.

== Influences ==
Haigh participated in the 2022 Sight and Sound poll, which is held once every 10 years for contemporary filmmakers to select their 10 favourite films in no particular order; he chose Black Narcissus (1947), Some Like It Hot (1959), L'avventura (1960), The Manchurian Candidate (1962), Cries and Whispers (1972), Don't Look Now (1973), Watership Down (1978), Ratcatcher (1999), Uzak (2002), and The Holy Girl (2004).

== Personal life ==
Haigh is gay. He is married to Andy Morwood, with whom he has two daughters.

== Filmography ==
=== Film ===
Year	Title	Director	Writer	Editor
2009	Greek Pete	Yes	Yes	Yes
2011	Weekend	Yes	Yes	Yes
2015	45 Years	Yes	Yes	No
2017	Lean on Pete	Yes	Yes	No
2023	All of Us Strangers	Yes	Yes	No
2026	A Long Winter	Yes	Yes	No

Short film

Year	Title	Director	Writer	Editor
2003	Oil	Yes	Yes	Yes
2005	Markings	Yes	Yes	No
2005	Cahuenga Blvd	Yes	Yes	Yes
2009	Five Miles Out	Yes	Yes	No

Editor / Miscellaneous

- 1996: The Proprietor - Production assistant (London)
- 2000: Small Time Obsession - Second assistant director
- 2000: Gladiator - Apprentice editor
- 2000: Born Romantic - Assistant editor
- 2000: Breathtaking - Assistant editor
- 2001: Black Hawk Down - Assistant editor
- 2002: The Count of Monte Cristo - Assistant editor
- 2002: The Four Feathers - Assistant editor
- 2003: Shanghai Knights - Assistant editor
- 2003: Mona Lisa Smile - Assistant editor
- 2004: Fits - Short film; unit production manager
- 2004: Fragments - Short film; first assistant director
- 2005: Kingdom of Heaven - Assistant editor
- 2007: The Good Night - Assistant editor (dailies)
- 2007: Hannibal Rising - Assistant editor
- 2007: Mister Lonely - First assistant editor
- 2008: A Matador's Mistress - First assistant editor
- 2008: Crack Willow - Editor

=== Television ===
Year	Title	Director	Writer	Notes
2014–2015	Looking	Yes	Yes	Also executive producer
2016	Looking: The Movie	Yes	Yes	TV movie
2019	The OA	Yes	No	2 episodes
2021	The North Water	Yes	Yes	Miniseries; also creator and executive producer

== Critical reception ==
Critical and public response of Marvel Cinematic Universe films
Film
Film	Rotten Tomatoes Critic Score	Rotten Tomatoes Average Critic Rating	Metacritic
Greek Pete	58% (12 reviews)	5.2/10	-
Weekend	95% (87 reviews)	8.1/10	81 (18 reviews)
45 Years	97% (211 reviews)	8.6/10	94 (36 reviews)
Lean on Pete	90% (190 reviews)	7.9/10	80 (40 reviews)
All of Us Strangers	96% (252 reviews)	8.8/10	90 (53 reviews)

== Awards and nominations ==
Year	Association	Category	Project	Result	Ref.
2009	Leeds International Film Festival	Yorkshire Film Award	Five Miles Out	Won	
2009	Atlanta Film Festival	Special Jury Award	Greek Pete	Won	
2009	L.A. Outfest	Programming Award for Artistic Achievement	Greek Pete	Won	
2011	Evening Standard British Film Awards	Best Screenplay	Weekend	Won	
2011	International Film Festival Rotterdam	MovieZone Award	Weekend	Won	
2011	L.A. Outfest	Grand Jury Award	Weekend	Won	
2011	London Film Critics' Circle Award	Breakthrough British Filmmaker	Weekend	Won	
2011	Nashville Film Festival	Best of Festival Award	Weekend	Won	
2011	San Francisco International LGBT Film Festival	Audience Award	Weekend	Won	
2011	SXSW Film Festival	Audience Award	Weekend	Won	
2015	Edinburgh International Film Festival	Michael Powell Award for Best British Feature Film	45 Years	Won	
2015	Evening Standard British Film Award	Editor's Award	45 Years	Won	
2015	London Film Critics' Circle Award	Best British / Irish Film of the Year	45 Years	Won	
2015	National Board of Review	Top Ten Independent Films	45 Years	Won	
2015	BAFTA Award	Outstanding British Film	45 Years	Nominated	
2015	Berlin International Film Festival	Golden Bear	45 Years	Nominated	
2015	British Independent Film Award	Best British Independent Film	45 Years	Nominated	
2015	British Independent Film Award	Best Director	45 Years	Nominated	
2015	British Independent Film Award	Best Screenplay	45 Years	Nominated	
2015	David di Donatello Award	Best European Film	45 Years	Nominated	
2015	Empire Award	Best British Film	45 Years	Nominated	
2015	European Film Award	Best Screenwriter	45 Years	Nominated	
2015	Evening Standard British Film Award	Best Film	45 Years	Nominated	
2015	London Film Critics' Circle Award	Best Film of the Year	45 Years	Nominated	
2015	London Film Critics' Circle Award	Director of the Year	45 Years	Nominated	
2015	San Francisco Film Critics Circle	Best Adapted Screenplay	45 Years	Nominated	
2018	British Independent Film Award	Best Director	Lean on Pete	Nominated	
2023	British Independent Film Award	Best British Independent Film	All of Us Strangers	Won	
2023	British Independent Film Award	Best Director	All of Us Strangers	Won	
2023	British Independent Film Award	Best Screenplay	All of Us Strangers	Won	
2024	Critics' Choice Movie Award	Best Adapted Screenplay	All of Us Strangers	Nominated	
2024	Satellite Award	Best Adapted Screenplay	All of Us Strangers	Nominated	
2024	BAFTA Award	Best Director	All of Us Strangers	Nominated	
2024	BAFTA Award	Best Adapted Screenplay	All of Us Strangers	Nominated	
2024	BAFTA Award	Outstanding British Film	All of Us Strangers	Nominated	
2024	Independent Spirit Award	Best Director	All of Us Strangers	Nominated	
