= Eizō Sugawa =

Filmmaker

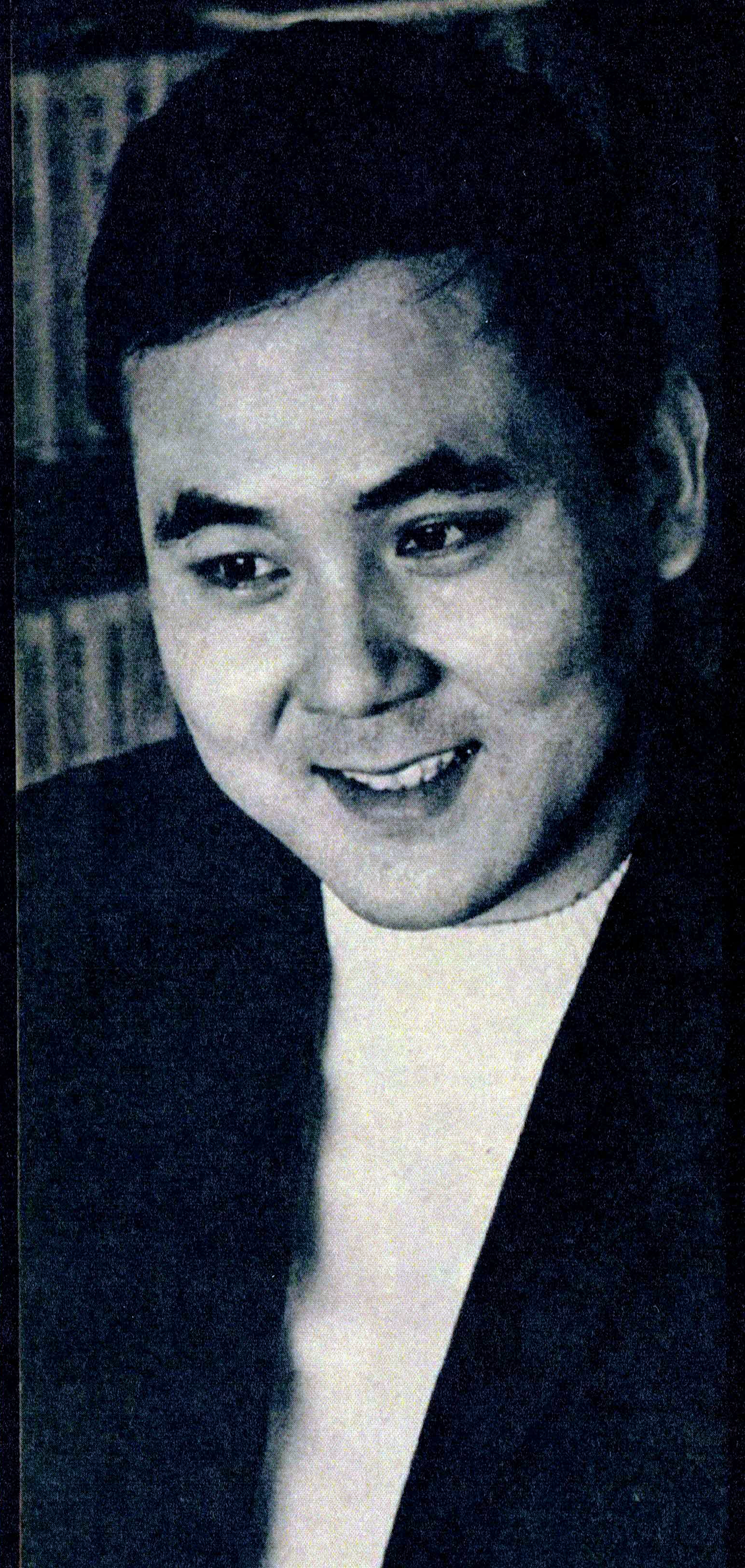
- Sugawa in 1967.
- Born: September 8, 1930; Osaka
- Died: October 2, 1998
- Occupation: Film director

Eizō Sugawa (須川栄三, Sugawa Eizō; September 8, 1930 – October 2, 1998) was a Japanese filmmaker.

== Career ==
Sugawa was born in Osaka to a family that owned an asbestos manufacturing business. He graduated from the economics department of Tokyo University in 1953, and subsequently joined Toho studios. He was inspired to enter the film industry after watching foreign films, which were imported into Japan in huge amounts following World War II.

While working as an assistant director, he wrote a script titled Kiken na Eiyūtachi that was published in screenplay magazine Independent. Toho producer Masakatsu Kaneko was impressed with the script, which depicted an ambitious reporter involved in a kidnapping incident with a touch reminiscent of American films, and used it as the basis for Kiken na Eiyū (1957), directed by Hideo Suzuki and starring Shintarō Ishihara.

In September 1958, Sugawa and Kihachi Okamoto were promoted to the rank of director by Toho to quell the ire of the company's assistant directors, who objected to the choice of an outsider, Shintarō Ishihara, to direct the film Wakai Kedamono (若い獣).

The promotion put Sugawa ahead of many of his colleagues, who had paid their dues for many years as assistant directors to work their way up to the position of chief assistant director. At the time, he had only worked as a chief assistant director on a single film, Mikio Naruse's 1958 The Summer Clouds (鰯雲, Iwashi-gumo). His promotion to director at the age of 27 after only five years at the company was extraordinarily fast. He eventually made his directorial debut with Seishun Hakusho: Otona ni wa Wakaranai.

Sugawa re-teamed with producer Kaneko on his second film Yajū Shisu Beshi (1959), which was lauded as a Japanese answer to the French New Wave and starred Tatsuya Nakadai, who was in between shooting the second and third installments of Masaki Kobayashi's The Human Condition. However, its original ending, in which the nihilistic protagonist escapes punishment for his crimes, sparked controversy when industry censorship organ Eirin and powerful Toho producer Sanezumi Fujimoto demanded that it be changed.

While making a name for himself with his refined hard-boiled touch, a rarity in Japanese film at the time, he also harbored an ambition to create a unique brand of Japanese musical film, to the extent that he traveled to the United States in 1964 to study American musicals. Before the year was out, he presented the culmination of his research, the musical Kimi mo Shusse ga Dekiru. Furthermore, his Seichō Matsumoto adaptation Kemonomichi was a coolly-depicted crime drama on an impressive scale that encompassed the machinations of the political world, and his entries in the Hitoshi Ueki-starring Nippon-Ichi no Otoko series were a darkly comedic look at post-war Japanese history (Nippon-Ichi no Uragiri Otoko) and a non-orthodox commentary on contemporary social conditions (Nippon-Ichi no Danzetsu Otoko).

Sugawa reinvigorated the Toho New Action genre in the mid-70's with two frenetic Hiroshi Fujioka vehicles: Yajū-gari, in which feuding father-and-son cops take on a radical group who kidnap a company president; and Yajū Shisu Beshi: Fukushū no Mekanikku, a more violent and revenge-driven sequel to his own Yajū Shisu Beshi, which helped lay the foundations of Toho New Action.

In 1976, Sugawa left Toho and set up his own independent production company called "Sugawa Eizō Productions." The following year, he teamed up with Art Theatre Guild to produce and release an adaptation of Hisashi Inoue's play Nihonjin no Heso, but subsequently concentrated on writing and directing television series. His accolades as a television writer include an Agency of Cultural Affairs Arts Festival Award for NHK drama series Igata, and a Galaxy Award for another NHK series, Chichi to Musume no Kisetsu.

In 1987 he directed his first film in 10 years, River of Fireflies starring Rentarō Mikuni. His final film was Tobu Yume o Shibaraku Minai, an adaptation of a novel by Taichi Yamada.

== Personality ==
Sugawa remained strictly non-religious throughout his life. and when he married actress Akemi Mari in 1969, they entered into a "contract of love" instead of holding a ceremony. He was also extremely particular when it came to filmmaking and seldom made compromises, which often led to clashes with authors when shooting films based on literary works. Writer Tatsuzō Ishikawa, who butted heads with Sugawa during the production of a film of his novel Bokutachi no Shippai, was quoted as saying furiously: "I've never had to endure such humiliation."

== Filmography ==
=== Writer ===
- 1957 Kiken na Eiyū (危険な英雄, directed by Hideo Suzuki)
- 1990 Ruten no umi (流転の海, directed by Buichi Saitō)

=== Director ===
- 1958 Seishun Hakusho: Otona ni wa Wakaranai (青春白書 大人には分らない)
- 1959 Yajū Shisu Beshi (野獣死すべし)
- 1960 Yama no Kanata ni (山のかなたに)
- 1960 Minagoroshi no Uta yori: Kenjū yo Saraba (みな殺しの歌より 拳銃よさらば)
- 1961 Ai to Honō to (愛と炎と)
- 1962 Aru Ōsaka no Onna (ある大阪の女, remake of Kenji Mizoguchi's Osaka Elegy)
- 1962 Bokutachi no Shippai (僕たちの失敗)
- 1963 Taiyō wa Yonde iru (太陽は呼んでいる)
- 1964 Kimi mo Shusse ga Dekiru (君も出世ができる)
- 1965 Kemonomichi (けものみち)
- 1967 Taifū to Zakuro (颱風とざくろ)
- 1968 Sararīman Akutōjutsu (サラリーマン悪党術)
- 1968 Nippon-Ichi no Uragiri Otoko (日本一の裏切り男)
- 1969 Burakku Komedi: Aa! Baka (ブラック・コメディ ああ!馬鹿)
- 1969 Nippon-Ichi no Danzetsu Otoko (日本一の断絶男)
- 1972 Hyakuman-nin no Daigasshō (百万人の大合唱)
- 1973 Yajū-gari (野獣狩り)
- 1974 Yajū Shisu Beshi: Fukushū no Mekanikku (野獣死すべし 復讐のメカニック)
- 1977 Nihonjin no Heso (日本人のへそ)
- 1987 River of Fireflies (蛍川, Hotarugawa)
- 1990 Tobu yume o shibaraku minai (飛ぶ夢をしばらく見ない)
