= Muddy River (film) =

- Theatrical release poster
- Directed by: Kōhei Oguri
- Screenplay by: Takako Shigemori
- Based on: Doro no Kawa by Teru Miyamoto
- Produced by: Motoyasu Kimura
- Starring: Takahiro Tamura; Mariko Kaga; Nobutaka Asahara
- Cinematography: Shōhei Andō
- Edited by: Nobuo Ogawa
- Music by: Kurōdo Mōri
- Production company: Kimura Productions
- Distributed by: Toei Company
- Release date: 30 January 1981 (Japan)
- Running time: 105 minutes
- Country: Japan
- Language: Japanese

Muddy River (Japanese: 泥の河, Hepburn: Doro no Kawa) is a 1981 Japanese drama film directed by Kōhei Oguri and based on the short story with the same title by Teru Miyamoto. It was nominated for the Academy Award for Best Foreign Language Film. The film was also entered into the 12th Moscow International Film Festival where it won the Silver Prize.

== Plot ==
In 1956 Osaka, Nobuo, a child living with his parents Shinpei and Sadako in a small diner near the river mouth, meets a boy named Kiichi. Kiichi, who lives on a houseboat moored across from the diner, is the same age as Nobuo, and his sister, Ginko, is 11. Neither Kiichi nor Ginko attend school. Rumors circulate that their mother entertains customers on the boat for a living, but Nobuo doesn't fully comprehend.

Kiichi and Ginko visit the diner together, and rumors spread among the customers that Kiichi is promoting the houseboat's services, which upsets Shinpei. This causes Kiichi and even Ginko to feel dejected.

One day, Nobuo is informed that one of Shinpei's "acquaintances" is on their deathbed and wishes to see Shinpei and his children in Kyoto. The woman turns out to be Shinpei's ex-wife (and Nobuo's biological mother), whom he left for Sadako after returning from the war. Both parents bear guilt, and Sadako tearfully apologizes to Shinpei's ex-wife.

Later, when Nobuo visits the boat, neither Kiichi nor Ginko are there, and he is summoned to the back room by the mother, Shouko. Nobuo feels unsettled in Shouko's presence, as she is unlike his own mother in every way.

On the day of the festival, Nobuo and Kiichi receive pocket money from Sadako to go out but lose it on the way home. That night, Nobuo visits the boat, where Kiichi shows him a treasure trove of crabs. Kiichi initiates a cruel game of burning crabs in oil, causing one to escape into the back room. Peeking through a small window, Nobuo witnesses Shouko in an intimate embrace with a tattooed man. Feeling awkward, Nobuo leaves without speaking to Kiichi and remains silent as he passes Ginko on his way out.

The next day, as the boat begins to move away from the shore, Nobuo notices and rushes out, calling Kiichi's name. Despite his efforts, he fails to catch up as the boat drifts away.

== Cast ==
- Takahiro Tamura as Shinpei Itakura
- Mariko Kaga as Shoko Matsumoto, Kiichi and Ginko's mother
- Nobutaka Asahara as Nobuo Itakura
- Makiko Shibata as Ginko Matsumoto
- Minoru Sakurai as Kiichi Matsumoto
- Yumiko Fujita as Sadako Itakura, Nobuo's mother
- Gannosuke Ashiya as Shinoda, the horse cart man

== Production ==
As Oguri recounted during lectures and other events, the president of a small to medium-sized company, originally a film enthusiast, had another project in the works that had to be abandoned due to unforeseen circumstances. However, the impulsive president quickly procured a 35mm film and enlisted Oguri to direct a film using it. This led to the idea of adapting the novel by Teru Miyamoto, a project the president had long been interested in pursuing.

The original story unfolds along the Tosabori River in the city of Osaka. Despite Oguri's inability to find a suitable filming location in Osaka, he scoured Hiroshima and Tokyo without success. Ultimately, the decision was made to shoot the film along the Nakagawa Canal in Nagoya.

Due to Mariko Kaga's prior commitments, a boat was transported to Toho Studios, where all scenes involving her were shot within a six-hour timeframe.

While the initial production costs were set at 35 million yen, the budget exceeded by an additional 10 million yen. To cover this shortfall, producer Motoyasu Kimura had to secure a loan.

== Distribution ==
Distribution posed a challenge initially due to the film being in black and white. Oguri turned to Nobuhiko Obayashi, a close friend from his early filmmaking days, who introduced the film to the Sogetsu Hall. Shigeru Okada, President of Toei, was deeply moved upon viewing the preview, describing it as an excellent film. Subsequently, Toei Central Film, a subsidiary of Toei, acquired the rights for 60 million yen and released the film nationwide through the Toei Pallas System.

== Awards and nominations ==
55th Kinema Junpo Best Ten Awards

- Won: Best Film
- Won: Best Japanese Director (Kōhei Oguri)
- Won: Best Supporting Actress (Mariko Kaga)

Japan Movie Pen Club

- First Place

36th Mainichi Film Awards

- Won: Best Film
- Won: Best Director (Kōhei Oguri)
- Won: Best Actor (Takahiro Tamura)

24th Blue Ribbon Awards

- Won: Best Film

6th Hochi Film Awards

- Won: Best New Artist (Kōhei Oguri, shared with Eri Ishida)

5th Japanese Academy Awards

- Won: Director of the Year (Kōhei Oguri)
- Nominated: Picture of the Year

54th Academy Awards

- Nominated: Best Foreign Language Film

Excellent Film Award from the Agency for Cultural Affairs

- Won

Silver Prize at the Moscow International Film Festival

- Won

Newcomer Encouragement Award from the Japan Film Directors Association

- Won

== See also ==
- Cinema of Japan
- List of submissions to the 54th Academy Awards for Best Foreign Language Film
- List of Japanese submissions for the Academy Award for Best Foreign Language Film
