= The North Water (novel) =

2016 novel by Ian McGuire

- First edition
- Author: Ian McGuire
- Language: English
- Genre: Fiction
- Publisher: Scribners
- Publication date: 2016
- Publication place: United Kingdom

The North Water is a 2016 novel by English author and academic Ian McGuire. The North Water was published by Henry Holt and Company (USA) and Simon & Schuster (UK)/Scribner (UK).

== Plot ==
The "north water" of the title is the North Water Polynya, to which ships sail in the endless pursuit of whales for their valuable oil. The novel opens in Hull where the industry is under threat due to cheaper paraffin and coal oil replacing whale oil. We meet Henry Drax, a harpooner of the whaling ship Volunteer who rapes and kills a child, "... a brute, a vacuum into which men and boys are sucked and do not emerge alive". Joining the crew of the Volunteer as their doctor is Irishman Patrick Sumner, a disgraced former British army surgeon with a murky past in India. They set sail under the command of Captain Brownlee, who lost his last ship and crew in a disaster at sea; in league with the corrupt shipowner Baxter, he intends to scuttle the Volunteer to carry out an insurance scam.

== Style ==
McGuire's focus of study and field of interest is American realist literature.The Guardian's reviewer writes, "The strength of The North Water lies in its well-researched detail and persuasive descriptions of the cold, violence, cruelty and the raw, bloody business of whale-killing." The headline of the Independent 's review, "Ian McGuire, The North Water: 'Subtle as a harpoon in the head, but totally gripping'", reinforces the realist aspect of the writing.

== Awards and honours ==
- 2016 Man Booker Prize, longlisted.
- 2016 New York Times 10 Best Books of 2016
- 2016 Shortlisted Los Angeles Times Book Prize Mystery/Thriller
- 2016 On the Chicago Tribune list of Best Books of the Year
- 2017 Royal Society of Literature Encore Award

== Television adaptation ==
The North Water has been adapted into a BBC Two five-part television serial. It premiered on July 15, 2021, on AMC+ (USA). In the UK The North Water will air autumn 2021 on BBC Two and BBC iPlayer. It stars Colin Farrell as Henry Drax, Jack O'Connell as Patrick Sumner, Stephen Graham as Captain Brownlee, and Tom Courtenay as Baxter. Commissioned by the BBC, The North Water is made by See-Saw Films for the BBC and is adapted and directed by Andrew Haigh. Executive producers are Jamie Laurenson, Hakan Kousetta, Iain Canning and Emile Sherman for See-Saw Films, Niv Fichman for Rhombus Media, and Jo McClellan for the BBC. The series was produced by Kate Ogborn. The North Water is distributed internationally by BBC Studios.
