= Dotonbori River =

1982 film by Kinji Fukasaku

- Film poster
- Directed by: Kinji Fukasaku
- Screenplay by: Kinji Fukasaku; Tatsuo Nogami
- Based on: Dōtonborigawa by Teru Miyamoto
- Produced by: Akira Oda
- Starring: Keiko Matsuzaka; Hiroyuki Sanada; Tsutomu Yamazaki; Kōichi Satō; Mariko Kaga
- Cinematography: Takashi Kawamata
- Edited by: Kazuo Ota
- Music by: Megumi Wakakusa
- Production company: Shochiku
- Distributed by: Shochiku
- Release date: June 12, 1982 (Japan)
- Running time: 123 minutes
- Country: Japan
- Language: Japanese
- Box office: ¥400 million

Dotonbori River (Japanese: 道頓堀川, Hepburn: Dotonborigawa), also released as Lovers Lost, is a 1982 Japanese romantic drama film directed by Kinji Fukasaku, adapted from the novel of the same name by Teru Miyamoto. The title refers to the area of Dōtonbori, a district of Osaka. Shochiku released Dotonbori River on June 12, 1982, in Japan.

== Plot ==
A nineteen-year-old aspiring painter named Kunihiko Yasuoka meets a woman when her dog Kotaro knocks over his painting easel. She gifts him a lemon, then he goes to work at a tearoom called River. His boss Mr. Takeuchi accompanies him to bury his mother's ashes, who has formerly died and left Kunihiko without any relatives. The boss's son Masao challenges junkie pool shark Kozo Watanabe to the best of nine games for a prize 300,000 yen. After Masao wins, Watanabe tells him that he would be even better if he learned the secret technique of his father, Tetsuo Takeuchi, who had been a pool shark 15 years earlier. Kunihiko and Masao collect Masao's winnings from Watanabe's wife, a dancer at a club called London. She turns out to be Satomi Matsumoto, one of their classmates, and only gives them half the money, promising to pay the rest the next week. Kunihiko and Masao bump into an irate man-about-town who threatens to kill Kunihiko. When Kunihiko returns to work, Mr. Takeuchi takes him out to a bar whose owner is Machiko, the woman Kunihiko met earlier.

Kaoru, a transgender performer and mother figure to a group of other transgender performers, is slapped by her lover (the same man-about-town) for not giving him enough money. Walking the streets of Dôtonbori, Mr. Takeuchi tells Kunihiko that Machiko is a former geisha who was left the bar by its former owner and that her patron is Mr. Tamura of Tamura Realty. Kunihiko visits Tamura Realty the next day but is afraid to approach Mr. Tamura when he sees him entering. Machiko tells Mr. Takeuchi that Kotaro has run away, so he sends Kunihiko out with her to look for it. They search for hours but do not find the dog. When she complains about getting older, he kisses her.

Watanabe takes all of Satomi's money for dope, leaving her unable to pay Masao the money he needs to challenge a hustler from Kobe, but he performs a trick shot for the owner of the pool hall, who agrees to stake him the money. Masao wins but she keeps the majority of the winnings. Mr. Takeuchi has Kunihiko bring Masao back to the tearoom, where he confesses to his son that his own gambling on pool is why Masao's mother killed herself. When Masao refuses to stop, the two begin fighting until Kunihiko stops them. Kaoru arrives drunk at the tearoom after closing time so Masao lets her stay in his room. When she says that he should get along with his father, Masao begins insulting her until she leaves in tears. Before she leaves, she confesses to Kunihiko that she is thinking of running away from her lover to Tokyo. Just then the man-about-town calls her at the tearoom and she gladly returns to him.

Kunihiko and Machiko spend a day together and confess that they are not sure what they want to do with their lives before having sex at her place. The owner of the pool hall tells Masao about an underground pool hustler competition in Tokyo but refuses to lend him the 1,500,000-yen entrance fee. Masao calls Kaoru, who also refuses to lend him the money. He goes to Machiko's bar and lies to her that Kunihiko needs the money to avoid being expelled from school but is too proud to ask for it, so she gives him the money. The bartender later admonishes Kunihiko for using his friend to get money from Machiko, so Kunihiko finds Masao at a mahjong parlor and demands the money but Masao refuses and leaves Kunihiko to be beaten by the other mahjong players whose games were disturbed. Satomi visits with the other 150,000 yen that Watanabe owed but Kunihiko tells her to leave it at the pool hall for Masao. She says that Watanabe has left and then dances nude for Kunihiko.

Mr. Takeuchi explains to the bartender that the money was actually for his son Masao and promises to pay it back himself. When he looks for Masao at the pool hall, he is enticed into playing a game. The owner reveals herself to be Yuki, the granddaughter of Tamada, one of Mr. Takeuchi's opponents 15 years earlier before he quit playing. She remembers how he helped her after her grandfather died and gave her money so that she would not have to sell her body, so she promises to help him improve his pool skills again. Machiko finds Kunihiko working as a billboard painter and tells him that Mr. Takeuchi repaid her and that she returned the bar to her ex-patron Mr. Tamura so that she would be free to live with Kunihiko.

Masao returns after losing all of his money in Tokyo and his father admonishes him. Mr. Takeuchi challenges his son to a game of pool and says that if Masao wins then he will give Masao the tearoom but if Masao loses then Masao must give up pool forever. During the game, Mr. Takeuchi shakes Masao's nerves by telling him that Mrs. Takeuchi did not kill herself because of his addiction to playing pool but rather because he made her sell herself to pay off his debts. Masao misses his last shot but Mr. Takeuchi gives him the option to live either life he chooses. On his way home, Kunihiko is caught in a fight between Kaoru and her lover and Kaoru accidentally stabs and kills him. Machiko finds her dog Kotaro again and sees several police cars racing past her as she wonders why Kunihiko is late.

== Cast ==
- Keiko Matsuzaka as Machiko
- Hiroyuki Sanada as Kunihiko Yasuoka
- Tsutomu Yamazaki as Tetsuo Takeuchi
- Kōichi Satō as Masao Takeuchi
- Mariko Kaga as Yuki
- Tsunehiko Watase as Kozo Watanabe
- Yuki Furutachi as Satomi Matsumoto (stripper)
- Maki Carrousel as Kaoru
- Akira Emoto as Ishizuka
- Rei Okamoto as Suzuko
- Akira Nagoya as Katsu-san
- Hideji Otaki as Tamada
- Ryuji Katagiri as Noguchi
- Rie Yokoyama as Rika

== Awards ==
Kinji Fukasaku won the Japan Academy Film Prize for Director of the Year in 1982 for his work on the film.
