= Ian McGuire =

English author

- Born: Hull, Yorkshire, UK
- Occupation: Author
- Spouse: Married
- Children: Two
- Writing career
- Notable work: The North Water

Ian McGuire (born 1964) is an English author and academic. In 1996 he joined the University of Manchester as a lecturer in American Literature and later lectured in Creative Writing. He was co-director of the Centre for New Writing and is currently a Senior Lecturer.

== Career ==
McGuire is from Hull, East Yorkshire and went to school at Hymers College, later studying at the University of Manchester. Later he received an MA from the University of Sussex then a Ph.D. in 19th Century American Literature from the University of Virginia. He has published stories in the Paris Review and Chicago Review among others. He has published articles on Walt Whitman, Herman Melville and William Dean Howells, and his sphere of interest is the American realist tradition from the 1880s onwards. His biography of Richard Ford, an American short story writer, "... argues that Ford’s work is best understood as a form of pragmatic realism and thus positions him as part of a deeply rooted and ongoing American debate about the nature of realism and pragmatism." His novel The North Water's strength "lies in its well-researched detail and persuasive descriptions of the cold, violence, cruelty and the raw, bloody business of whale-killing."

== Personal life ==
Ian McGuire is married and lives with his wife and two children in Manchester.

== Awards ==
The North Water was longlisted for the Man Booker Prize 2016

The North Water New York Times 10 Best Books of 2016

The North Water Royal Society of Literature Encore Award

Historical Writers' Association Gold Crown Award

== Bibliography ==
=== Fiction ===
- —— (2006). Incredible Bodies. Bloomsbury Publishing. ISBN 9781408882474.
- —— (2016). The North Water. Simon & Schuster. ISBN 9781250118141.
- —— (2020). The Abstainer. Simon & Schuster. ISBN 9780593133873.
- —— (2025). White River Crossing. Simon & Schuster. ISBN 9781398505032.

=== Non-Fiction ===
- 2015 Richard Ford and the Ends of Realism, University of Iowa Press
