= Takayuki Sakazume =

Japanese actor

- Born: Chiba Prefecture, Japan
- Education: Chiba University of Commerce; Himawari Theatre Group
- Occupation: Actor
- Years active: 1978–present
- Agent: aksent

Takayuki Sakazume (坂詰 貴之, Sakazume Takayuki) is a Japanese actor.

== Roles ==
=== Live-action ===
- River of Fireflies (1987) (Takio Mizushima)

=== Anime ===
- Kaleido Star (2003) (Mute)
- Yakitate!! Japan (2004) (Kai Suwabara)
- Mobile Suit Gundam Unicorn (2016) (Besson)
- Moriarty the Patriot (2021) (Inspector Sturridge)
- JoJo's Bizarre Adventure: Stone Ocean (2023) (Vincent van Gogh)
- The Marginal Service (2023) (Bennett Wells)
- Birdie Wing -Golf Girls' Story- (2023) (Michael Burton)
- The Ghost in the Shell (2026) (Toru Soma)

=== Games ===
- Sonic the Hedgehog (2006) (Mephiles)
- Cross Edge (2008) (Judas)
- Ninja Blade (2009) (Ken Ogawa)
- Armored Core VI: Fires of Rubicon (2023) (Handler Walter)
- Monster Hunter Stories 3: Twisted Reflection (2026) (Fiero)

=== Dubbing roles ===
==== Live-action ====
- Jon Bernthal
  - The Walking Dead (Shane Walsh)
  - Fury (Grady "Coon-Ass" Travis)
  - Baby Driver (Griff)
  - Shot Caller (Frank "Shotgun")
  - The Punisher (Frank Castle / Punisher)
  - Ford v Ferrari (Lee Iacocca)
  - Those Who Wish Me Dead (Ethan)
  - The Unforgivable (Blake)
  - The Odyssey (Menelaus)
  - Spider-Man: Brand New Day (Frank Castle / Punisher)
- 500 Days of Summer (Paul (Matthew Gray Gubler))
- American Hustle (Mayor Carmine Polito (Jeremy Renner))
- Awake (Dr. Jack Harper (Terrence Howard))
- Back to the Future Part II (2018 BS Japan edition) (Fujitsu (Jim Ishida))
- Big Miracle (Adam Carlson (John Krasinski))
- Big Wolf on Campus (Tommy Dawkins (Brandon Quinn))
- BlacKkKlansman (Detective Philip Zimmerman (Adam Driver))
- Boy Erased (Victor Sykes (Joel Edgerton))
- Cabin Fever (Bert (James DeBello))
- Captain Phillips (Shane Murphy (Michael Chernus))
- D-War (Ethan Kendrick (Jason Behr))
- Darkness Falls (Kyle Walsh (Chaney Kley))
- The Day After Tomorrow (J.D. (Austin Nichols))
- Dead Silence (Jamie Ashen (Ryan Kwanten))
- Desperate Housewives (John Rowland (Jesse Metcalfe))
- Dredd (Kay (Wood Harris))
- Ex Machina (Nathan Bateman (Oscar Isaac))
- F9 (Jack Toretto (J. D. Pardo))
- The Family Stone (Ben Stone (Luke Wilson))
- Firewall (2009 TV Asahi edition) (Willy (Vincent Gale))
- First Man (Ed White (Jason Clarke))
- Flight 93 (Mark Bingham (Ty Olsson))
- Freedom Writers (Andre Bryant (Mario))
- Harriet (John Tubman (Zackary Momoh))
- Harry Potter and the Goblet of Fire (Viktor Krum (Stanislav Ianevski))
- The Hurt Locker (Sergeant J. T. Sanborn (Anthony Mackie))
- In Time (2025 BS10 Star Channel edition) (Henry Hamilton (Matt Bomer))
- Infinite (Otto Bathurst 2020 (Chiwetel Ejiofor))
- It's Complicated (Harley (John Krasinski))
- John Carter (Kantos Kan (James Purefoy))
- Jurassic World (2017 NTV edition) (Hamada (Brian Tee))
- L.A.'s Finest (Ben Baines (Duane Martin))
- Lakeview Terrace (Detective Javier Villareal (Jay Hernandez))
- The Lord of the Rings: The Rings of Power (Durin IV (Owain Arthur))
- Luther (DCI John Luther (Idris Elba))
- Magnum P.I. (Thomas Magnum (Jay Hernandez))
- The Marine series (Jake Carter (The Miz))
- Martha Marcy May Marlene (Ted (Hugh Dancy))
- Mission: Impossible III (Declan Gormley (Jonathan Rhys Meyers))
- Monsters: Dark Continent (Frankie Maguire (Joe Dempsie))
- Obi-Wan Kenobi (Kawlan Roken (O'Shea Jackson Jr.))
- The Odd Life of Timothy Green (James Green (Joel Edgerton))
- Once Upon a Time (Pinocchio / August Wayne Booth (Eion Bailey))
- Open Graves (Jason (Mike Vogel))
- Pay the Ghost (Detective Jordan Reynolds (Lyriq Bent))
- The Player (Detective Cal Brown (Damon Gupton))
- The Rocker (Curtis Powell (Teddy Geiger))
- Roswell (Max Evans (Jason Behr))
- The Ruins (Eric (Shawn Ashmore))
- The Samaritan (Ethan (Luke Kirby))
- Stargate: The Ark of Truth (Cameron "Cam" Mitchell (Ben Browder))
- Stargate: Continuum (Cameron "Cam" Mitchell (Ben Browder))
- Stranger Things (Bob Newby (Sean Astin))
- Squid Game (Seong Gi-hun (Lee Jung-jae))
- Top Gun (2005 NTV edition) (LTJG Sam "Merlin" Wells (Tim Robbins))
- Unhinged (Tom Cooper (Russell Crowe))
- Wander (Sheriff Luis Santiago (Raymond Cruz))
- Warcraft (King Llane Wrynn (Dominic Cooper))
- Wild Tales (Simón Fischer (Ricardo Darín))

==== Animation ====
- Dragon Tales (Ord)
