= Strangers (Yamada novel) =

1987 novel by Taichi Yamada

- First edition Japanese cover (publ. 新潮社)
- Author: Taichi Yamada
- Original title: Ijintachi to no natsu 異人たちとの夏
- Translator: Wayne P. Lammers (2003)
- Language: Japanese
- Genre: Literature; Drama; Supernatural
- Publisher: Shinchosha
- Publication date: 1987
- Publication place: Japan
- English publication date: 2003
- Media type: Print (hardcover, paperback)
- Pages: 217 (JP paperback); 208 (US paperback); 203 (UK paperback)
- ISBN: 1-932-23403-9 (US edition); ISBN 0-57-122437-7 (UK edition); ISBN 4-10-360602-9 (JP edition)
- OCLC: 53154364
- Dewey Decimal: 891.733
- LC Class: PL865.A5128 I3913 2003

Strangers (Japanese: 異人たちとの夏, Romanization: Ijintachi to no natsu, lit. Summer with the Strangers) is a novel by Taichi Yamada, first published in 1987 by Shinchosha.

== Plot ==
Hideo Harada, a 47-year-old TV scriptwriter in Tokyo, is lonely. He has moved to an apartment in a business building in a desolate area near the Tokyo ringway. He's recently divorced and his teenage son wants nothing to do with him.

Harada meets his only neighbour, Kei, a mysterious 33-year old woman living in his building, which is otherwise deserted at night.

One day, Harada visits Asakusa, his childhood home town until he lost his parents in an accident. A couple who resemble Harada's parents as they were when they died invite him into their home. Harada wonders if he is experiencing hallucinations, but continues to visit the couple.

Eventually his health declines and he begins to look haggard. This is noticed by Kei, with whom he has started a relationship. Harada realises that the couple are ghosts who are sapping his life-force, and says goodbye to them one last time.

His continued haggard condition is brought even more plainly to his attention by his friend, who has been romantically engaged with Harada’s ex-wife. This leads to a shocking conclusion.

== Translations ==
The English translation by Wayne P. Lammers was published in 2003. The novel has also been translated into German as Sommer mit Fremden, French as Présences d'un été, and Swedish as Främlingar.

== Awards ==
The original Japanese novel won the 1988 Yamamoto Shūgorō Prize for best human-interest novel. Its English translation was one of sixteen works long-listed for the 2006 Foreign Fiction prize awarded by The Independent.

== Adaptations ==
A film based on the novel, The Discarnates, directed by Obayashi Nobuhiko, was released on September 15, 1988. The 2023 English-language film All of Us Strangers, directed by Andrew Haigh, is also based on the novel.
