= 9th Yokohama Film Festival =

1988 Japanese film festival edition

- Location: Kannai Hall, Yokohama, Kanagawa, Japan
- Founded: 1980
- Festival date: 6 February 1988

The 9th Yokohama Film Festival (第9回ヨコハマ映画祭) was held on 6 February 1988 in Kannai Hall, Yokohama, Kanagawa, Japan.

== Awards ==
- Best Film: The Emperor's Naked Army Marches On
- Best Actor: Saburō Tokitō – Eien no 1/2
- Best Actress: Yasuko Tomita – Bu Su
- Best New Actress:
  - Asako Kobayashi – Hahako kankin: mesu
  - Michiru Akiyoshi – Luminous Woman
  - Yasuyo Shirashima – Honba Joshikō Manual: Hatsukoi Binetsu-hen
- Best Supporting Actor: Sabu Kawahara – Hahako kankin: mesu
- Best Supporting Actress: Eri Ishida – Chōchin
- Best Director:
  - Shunichi Kajima – Chōchin
  - Kazuo Hara – The Emperor's Naked Army Marches On
- Best New Director: Chisho Itoh – Gondola
- Best Screenplay: Hiroshi Saito – Honba Joshikō Manual: Hatsukoi Binetsu-hen, Itoshino Half Moon
- Best Cinematography: Toshihiko Uryū – Gondola
- Special Jury Prize: Chōchin – For the staff.
- Special Prize: Kensaku Morita (Career)

== Best 10 ==
1. The Emperor's Naked Army Marches On
2. Bu Su
3. Totto Channel
4. Eien no 1/2
5. Chōchin
6. Lovers' Time
7. Koisuru Onnatachi
8. Honba Joshikō Manual: Hatsukoi Binetsu-hen
9. Luminous Woman
10. Gondola

runner-up: Makeup
