= Bu Su =

1987 film by Jun Ichikawa

- Film poster
- Directed by: Jun Ichikawa
- Written by: Makiko Uchidate
- Produced by: Kunisuke Hirabayashi; Takaomi Deguchi; Toshiaki Nakazawa
- Starring: Yasuko Tomita; Michiyo Ōkusu; Kazue Itō; Masahiro Takashima; Issey Ogata
- Cinematography: Tatsuhiko Kobayashi
- Edited by: Yoshiyuki Okuhara
- Music by: Bun Itakura
- Production companies: Toho; Amuse Cinema City
- Distributed by: Toho-Towa
- Release date: October 31, 1987 (Japan)
- Running time: 95 minutes
- Country: Japan
- Language: Japanese

Bu Su (Japanese: ブス, Hepburn: Busu), stylized in promotional materials as BU・SU, is a 1987 Japanese drama film directed by Jun Ichikawa. It was Ichikawa's feature film debut.

The film was theatrically released by Toho-Towa on October 31, 1987, in Japan. Its score was composed by Bun Itakura, while the theme song, "Ajisai no Uta" (あじさいのうた, Hydrangea Song), was performed by Yuko Hara of the band Southern All Stars. Lead actress Yasuko Tomita received awards for her performance.

== Premise ==
After a traumatic incident, 18-year-old Mugiko (Yasuko Tomita) departs her Izu island village, leaving behind her mother, a famous former geisha. Mugiko goes to live with her aunt, who runs a geisha house in the Kagurazaka district of Tokyo. Once she arrives, Mugiko chooses to enroll in geisha training as her mother once did, while also attending high school in the city. She is given the geisha name "Suzume" by her aunt. Her decision, however, is met with a number of obstacles. She begins her training at the lowest level, only allowed to serve drinks to the customers. After angering her aunt with her lack of ability, Mugiko is further demoted, made to run behind the carriages that move the geishas from event to event.

Mugiko's school life is similarly troubled. Her timid and private nature leaves her isolated from her peers. Tsuda (Masahiro Takashima), a handsome classmate and boxing enthusiast, is the only person Mugiko interacts with. A popular fellow classmate, jealous of Tsuda's attraction to Mugiko, peer pressures Mugiko into performing for their school's centenary cultural festival. Despite her reluctance, Mugiko decides to perform the climactic scene of Yaoya Oshichi, a kabuki play based on the story of a teenage girl who committed arson to be reunited with a boy she loved. With the help of her aunt and a mentally impaired girl whom she saved from bullying, Mugiko prepares for her performance and begins to open up to the world around her.

== Cast ==
- Yasuko Tomita as Mugiko Morishita/"Suzume"
- Michiyo Ōkusu as Kochou
- Kazue Itō as Ageha
- Masahiro Takashima as Tsuda
- Issey Ogata as Kitazaki
- Yasuyo Shirashima as Reiko
- Shigeru Muroi as Ponta
- Mitsuko Oka as Yukino
- Nobuo Nakamura as Customer
- Kei Suma as Customer
- Tomoko Taya
- Yuriko Hirooka

== Production ==
Bu Su was conceived as a vehicle for Yasuko Tomita, an idol who was at the peak of her popularity in the late 1980s. She had previously given an award-winning performance in Aiko 16 sai (1983), and had also starred in the Nobuhiko Obayashi films Lonely Heart and Four Sisters, both in 1985. Obayashi was originally set to direct Bu Su, but he chose to make His Motorbike, Her Island, Poisson D'avril, Bound for the Fields, the Mountains, and the Seacoast and The Drifting Classroom instead. Thus Bu Su became the directorial debut of in-demand commercial director Jun Ichikawa.

The film's title is pejorative slang referring to women who are not considered attractive. It can also refer to "emotional ugliness" and isolation.

Frequent Ichikawa collaborator Bun Itakura composed the film's score, while musician Yuko Hara performed the film's theme song, "Ajisai no Uta" (あじさいのうた, Hydrangea Song).

== Awards ==
9th Yokohama Film Festival

- Won: Best Actress - Yasuko Tomita
- 2nd Best Film
