= Exchange Students =

Exchange students may refer to:

- Exchange student, an educational opportunity where a student studies in another country Exchange student
- Exchange Students, a Japanese movie Tenkōsei
