= Drugstore Girl =

- Film poster
- Directed by: Katsuhide Motoki
- Written by: Kankurō Kudō
- Produced by: Nobuyuki Tohya
- Starring: Rena Tanaka; Akira Emoto
- Cinematography: Sanshi Hanada
- Edited by: Isao Kawase
- Music by: Yoshikazu Suo
- Distributed by: Shochiku
- Release date: 7 February 2004 (Japan)
- Running time: 105 minutes
- Country: Japan
- Language: Japanese

Drugstore Girl (Japanese: ドラッグストアガール, Hepburn: Doraggu sutoa gaaru) is a 2004 Japanese comedy film directed by the Japanese filmmaker Katsuhide Motoki about a young student who works in a convenience store, and five middle-aged men who develop crushes on her.

The film is set in a rural town and features lacrosse prominently. The cast includes Rena Tanaka as Keiko Obayashi (the student) and Akira Emoto as Nabe-yan (the leader of the five men).

== Plot ==
Keiko Obayashi is a third year chemistry student in Tokyo. After finding her boyfriend in the bathtub with another student, she takes a train out of Tokyo. She wakes up in rural Masao, where she soon finds a job working in a newly opened convenience store.

Meanwhile, five middle-aged men who run local shops are worried about the competition from the new store, and plan to disrupt it. However, they all fall in love with Keiko as soon as they see her inside the store.

After following her one-day, Nabe discovers that she plays lacrosse at the university. The men decide to take up lacrosse in an effort to get a date with her. The film follows them as they practice in secret, are found out by Keiko who agrees to coach them, and finally play a match against a lacrosse team from America who are attracted by the Native American nickname (Geronimo) of one of their players.

The men are heavily defeated, but Geronimo becomes a hero when he scores the team's only point, and the film ends with him flying to America with the Americans.

== Cast ==
- Rena Tanaka as Keiko Obayashi
- Akira Emoto as Koji Nabeshima
- Yuji Miyake as Numata
- Masatō Ibu as Yamada
- Yu Tokui as Geronimo
- Yoshiyoshi Arakawa as Shinji
- Naomasa Musaka as Sainen
- Yoshiko Mita as Drugstore President
- Noriko Eguchi
- Yumiko Fujita as Tomie
- Jun Haichi
- Thomas J. Melesky as Hiawatha Player
- Masaki Naito as Drugstore staff
- Toshie Negishi as Yamada's wife
- Ippei Osako
- Naoki Sugiura as Dr. Takenouchi
- Yasunari Takeshima as Drugstore Customer
- Isao Yatsu
- Kimiko Yo as Hideko Mukai
