= Satomi Kobayashi =

Japanese actress from Tokyo (born 1965)

- 小林 聡美
- Born: May 24, 1965 (age 61); Tokyo, Japan
- Occupation: Actress
- Years active: 1979–present
- Spouse: Kōki Mitani (m. 1995–2011)

Satomi Kobayashi (小林 聡美, Kobayashi Satomi; born May 24, 1965) is a Japanese actress from Tokyo. She won the award for best newcomer at the 4th Yokohama Film Festival for Exchange Students. She was previously married to screenwriter Kōki Mitani. She is known for playing Kimie Onda in Yappari Neko ga Suki series. She also starred in Kamome Shokudo, also known as Ruokala Lokki in Finnish.

== Filmography ==
=== Film ===
- I Are You, You Am Me (1982)
- The Deserted City (1983)
- Lonely Heart (1985)
- Young Girls in Love (1986)
- Eien no 1/2 (1987)
- グリーン・レクイエム (Gurīn rekuiemu; 1988)
- Beijing Watermelon (1989)
- やっぱり猫が好き 恩田三姉妹の京都大騒動編 (Video) (1990)
- Godzilla vs. Mothra (1992)
- てなもんや商社 萬福貿易商社 (1998)
- やっぱり猫が好き 新作'98 (Video; 1998)
- キリコの風景 (1998)
- Sweet Sweet Ghost (2000)
- やっぱり猫が好き 新作'2001 (Video; 2001)
- Ryoma's Wife, Her Husband and Her Lover (2002)
- Kamome Shokudo (2006) aka Ruokala lokki
- Megane (めがね; 2007)
- Tokyo Oasis (2011)
- Pale Moon (2014)
- Sing My Life (2016)
- After the Storm (2016)
- Family of Strangers (2019)
- Kiba: The Fangs of Fiction (2021)
- Tsuyukusa (2022)
- The Crescent Moon with Cats (2024)
- Maru (2024), Wakakusa
- 2126, Looking for the Sea's Star (2026)
- All Our Tomorrows (2026), Michiko Kushibiki

=== Television ===
- Kinpachi-sensei (1979-80)
- Yappari Neko ga Suki (1988-1990)
- Gift (1997)
- Twinkle (1998)
- Ren'ai kekkon no housoku (1999)
- Chūshingura 1/47 (2001)
- Suika (2003)
- Kuruneko (2009)
- Anone (2018)
- Pension Metsa (2021)
- Hirayasumi (2025), narrator

=== Dubbing ===
- Last Night in Soho, Ms. Tobin (Elizabeth Berrington)
- Quiz, Claudia Rosencrantz (Aisling Bea)
- Yellowstone, Tate Dutton (Brecken Merrill)
