= Vengeance Is Mine (1979 film) =

- Theatrical release poster
- Directed by: Shōhei Imamura
- Screenplay by: Masaru Baba; Shunsaku Ikehata
- Based on: Vengeance Is Mine by Ryūzō Saki
- Produced by: Kazuo Inoue
- Starring: Ken Ogata; Mayumi Ogawa; Rentarō Mikuni; Mitsuko Baisho
- Cinematography: Shinsaku Himeda
- Edited by: Keiichi Uraoka
- Music by: Shin’ichirō Ikebe
- Distributed by: Shochiku
- Release date: April 21, 1979 (Japan)
- Running time: 140 minutes
- Country: Japan
- Language: Japanese

Vengeance Is Mine (Japanese: 復讐するは我にあり, Hepburn: Fukushū suru wa ware ni ari) is a 1979 Japanese film directed by Shōhei Imamura, based on the book of the same name by Ryūzō Saki. It depicts the true story of serial killer Akira Nishiguchi, changing the protagonist's name to Iwao Enokizu.

== Plot ==
In the opening scenes, serial killer Iwao Enokizu is taken to a police station, where he is greeted by an angry mob and a huge crowd of journalists. The police interrogate him, but he refuses to answer. The film then switches to a series of flashback sequences, starting with the initial murders. Enokizu tricks and then kills two men, steals their money and disappears. He travels to another city, where he asks a taxi driver to take him to an inn where he can get a prostitute. He tells the innkeeper, a woman called Haru, that he is a professor at Kyoto University. The police, searching for Enokizu, put out bulletins with his face on television. The prostitute thinks the professor is Enokizu, but she is told not to go to the police because of her job.

In a flashback going back to Enokizu's childhood, he is seen as a rebellious, violent child and son of a Catholic father Shizuo, whose fishing boats were forcibly conscripted by the Japanese Navy in the 1930s. As a young man after the war, Enokizu is convicted and imprisoned for fraud. His wife Kazuko, who is attracted to Shizuo, divorces Enokizu, but is persuaded by Shizuo to remarry him, due to his Catholic beliefs. After the remarriage, Kazuko and Shizuo engage in a sexual act while bathing, during which the latter coldly rebuffs her. Shizuo then encourages a railway worker to sleep with Kazuko to satiate her. Enokizu, discharged from prison and suspecting a dalliance, accuses her of sleeping with Shizuo while he served his sentence.

Enokizu, still wanted by the police, travels to Tokyo. He tricks the mother of a young defendant into giving him the bail money for her son. He then befriends a lawyer, kills him and uses his apartment, where he hides his victim's body. He sends some money to Haru, and travels back to her place, where Haru's mother, a convicted murderer, has recently been released from prison. Haru and her mother realise that the alleged professor is the wanted man, but keep it a secret. Enokizu and Haru enter into a tentative relationship. Haru is raped by a benefactor who uses her as his mistress, while her mother and Enokizu are forced to watch silently. Enokizu, sure that Haru is carrying their unborn child, kills both Haru and her mother and pawns their goods. The prostitute from before, upon seeing Enokizu again, reports him to the police.

Five years later, Enokizu has been executed and cremated. His father and wife go to the top of a mountain to scatter his ashes, but the thrown bones remain hanging in the air.

== Cast ==
- Ken Ogata as Iwao Enokizu
- Rentarō Mikuni as Shizuo Enokizu, Iwao's father
- Mitsuko Baisho – as Kazuko Enokizu, Iwao's wife
- Chocho Miyako as Kayo Enokizu, Iwao's mother
- Mayumi Ogawa – as Haru Asano
- Nijiko Kiyokawa as Hisano Asano, Haru's mother
- Taiji Tonoyama as Tanejiro Shibata, the first victim
- Goro Tarumi as Daihachi Baba, the second victim
- Moeko Ezawa as Chiyoko Hata
- Kazuko Shirakawa as Sachiko Yoshizato
- Frankie Sakai as Detective Kawai
- Torahiko Hamada as Chief Detective Yoshino
- Yasuhisa Sonoda as Detective Kuwata
- Akira Hamada as Detective Ichikawa
- Kazunaga Tsuji as Detective Kuchiishi
- Shōhei Hino as Haru's friend
- Yoshi Katō as the lawyer Kawashima, the third victim
- Toshie Negishi as the prostitute ("stick girl")
- Kin Sugai as Defendant's mother

== Reception ==
Jasper Sharp commented, "Both seducing and repelling with its unusual story and grisly humour, Imamura uncovers a seedy underbelly of civilised Japanese society." Roger Ebert called the movie "a cry of despair and hopelessness on behalf of its insane hero" and "poignant, tragic and banal enough to deserve the comparison with Crime and Punishment." On the review aggregator website Rotten Tomatoes, 100% of 11 critics' reviews are positive. Metacritic, which uses a weighted average, assigned the film a score of 85 out of 100, based on 13 critics, indicating "universal acclaim".

== Awards ==
The film won the 1979 Best Picture Award at the Japanese Academy Awards, and was awarded for Best Screenplay and Best Actor (Ken Ogata) at the Yokohama Film Festival.

== Sources ==
- Buehrer, Beverley (1990). "Vengeance Is Mine (1979) Fukusho sure wa ware ni ari". Japanese Films: A Filmography and Commentary, 1921-1989. Jefferson, North Carolina, and London: McFarland. pp. 225–229. ISBN 0-89950-458-2.
