= Hirona Yamazaki =

Japanese actress (born 1994)

- 山崎 紘菜
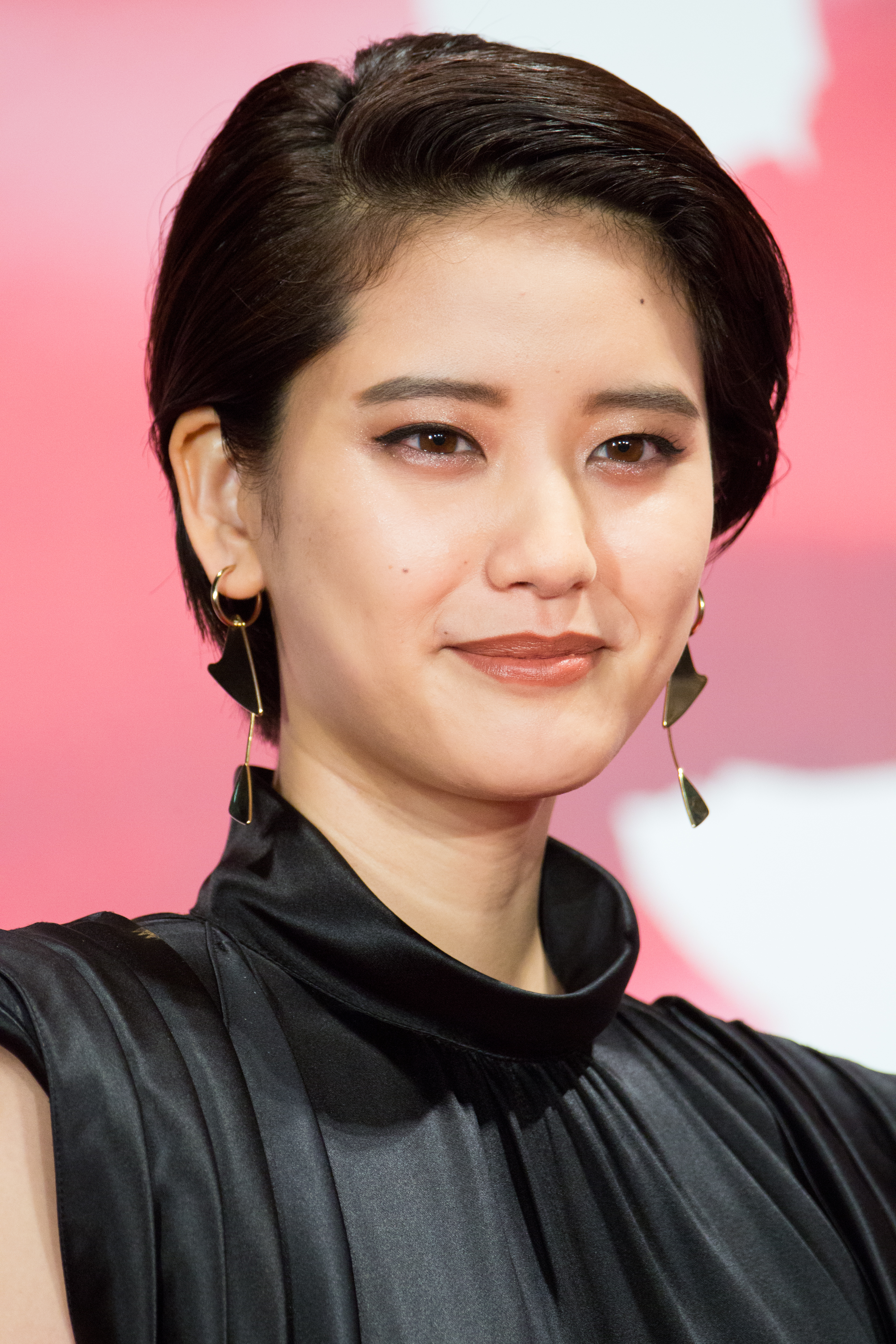
- Yamazaki at Tokyo International Film Festival in 2017
- Born: April 25, 1994 (age 32); Chiba Prefecture, Japan
- Occupation: Actress
- Years active: 2011–present
- Agent: Toho Entertainment

Hirona Yamazaki (山崎 紘菜, Yamazaki Hirona; born April 25, 1994, in Chiba Prefecture, Japan) is a Japanese actress who is represented by the talent agency Toho Entertainment.

== Biography ==
Yamazaki won the Special Jury Prize at the 7th Toho Cinderella Audition. Her first film appearance is in We Were There and her first television drama appearance is in Kōkō Nyūshi. Yamazaki later appeared in films such as Kyō, Koi o Hajimemasu, Casting Blossoms to the Sky, and Lesson of the Evil.

In 2012, she served as the official image character of the Meiji University Rugby Club, and was appointed as an image model in the 50th National University Rugby Football Championship in 2013. Yamazaki was also an image model in the 51st National University Rugby Football Championship in 2014.

In 2013, she served as the festival navigator in the Tokyo International Film Festival.

In 2014, Yamazaki's first heroine role was in Kami-sama no Iu Toori as Ichika Akimoto.

== Filmography ==
=== Drama ===
Year	Title	Role	Notes	Ref.
2012	Kōkō Nyūshi	Erina Ishikawa		
2015	Prison School	Mari Kurihara		
2016	Mars	Harumi Sugihara		
2016	Cain and Abel	Hikari Shibata		
2017	Chameleon Actor	Kanae Nomiya	TV movie	
2019	No Side Manager	Risa Nakamoto		
2021	Nemesis	Meiko Mima		
2022	Doronjo	Aika Hijirikawa		
2022–23	Maiagare!	Rinko Yano	Asadora	
2024	Onsha no Midare Tadashimasu!	Rei Saegusa	Lead role	
2025	Happy Kanako's Killer Life	Ōmori		
2026	Tonight, I Have a Date with a Serial Killer	Kaede Tsuruoka		

=== Films ===
Year	Title	Role	Notes	Ref.
2012	We Were There: First Love			
2012	We Were There: True Love			
2012	Kono Sora no Hana Nagaoka Hanabi Monogatari	Nozomi Yuge		
2012	Lesson of the Evil	Yuki Tsukahara		
2012	Love for Beginners			
2014	Cinema Travel: Eigakan de Miru Seikaiisan no Tabi	Tour Navigator		
2014	Seven Weeks	Kasane Suzuki		
2014	As the Gods Will	Ichika Akimoto		
2015	Orange	Takako Chino		
2016	Gold Medal Man	Megumi Hashimoto		
2016	Mars	Harumi Sugihara		
2017	Let's Go, Jets!	Yui Kito		
2017	Four Seasons Story	Miyu Tagagi	Lead role	
2017	Hanagatami	Akine		
2018	Killing for the Prosecution	Nanako Mogami		
2018	50 First Kisses	Sumire		
2019	Startup Girls	Nozomi	Lead role	
2020	Labyrinth of Cinema	Kazuko Yoshiyama		
2020	Kamen Rider Zero-One the Movie: Real×Time	Akane Tono		
2020	Monster Hunter	Handler	American film	
2021	Brave: Gunjō Senki	Haruka Seno		
2022	Grown-ups	Itō		
2022	Love Life	Yamazaki		
2025	Who Cares?: The Movie	Hotta		
2025	One Last Throw	Mako Yokota		

=== Dubbing ===
- Night at the Museum: Secret of the Tomb (Shepseheret (Anjali Jay))
