= Labyrinth of Cinema =

- Promotional release poster

Japanese name
- Kanji: 海辺の映画館 キネマの玉手箱
- Directed by: Nobuhiko Obayashi
- Written by: Nobuhiko Obayashi; Kazuya Konaka; Tadashi Naitō
- Produced by: Nobuhiko Obayashi
- Starring: Takuro Atsuki; Yoshihiko Hosoda; Takahito Hosoyamada; Rei Yoshida; Riko Narumi
- Cinematography: Hisaki Sanbongi
- Edited by: Nobuhiko Obayashi
- Music by: Kosuke Yamashita
- Distributed by: Crescendo House (US)
- Release dates: 1 November 2019 (Tokyo); 27 April 2021 (United Kingdom)
- Running time: 179 minutes
- Country: Japan
- Language: Japanese
- Box office: $4,501

Labyrinth of Cinema (Japanese: 海辺の映画館 キネマの玉手箱) is a 2019 Japanese anti-war fantasy drama film written, produced, directed and edited by Nobuhiko Obayashi. It stars Takuro Atsuki, Takahito Hosoyamada and Yoshihiko Hosoda as three present-day Onomichi moviegoers who find themselves transported back to 1945, just prior to the atomic bombing of Hiroshima. The cast also includes Rei Yoshida, Riko Narumi, Hirona Yamazaki and Takako Tokiwa.

Labyrinth of Cinema premiered at the 2019 Tokyo International Film Festival. It is Obayashi's final film before his death in 2020, as well as Yukihiro Takahashi and Hiroshi Inuzuka's last film roles before their deaths in 2023.

== Plot ==
On the eve of closing down for the last time, a local cinema is hosting an all-night movie marathon, showing classic Japanese war films. Three men, Mario Baba (a film buff), Shigeru (a Buddhist monk turned Yakuza street-thug) and Hosuke (an intellectual film historian) have all come to the cinema, albeit for different reasons, to watch the film. A fourth individual, a young schoolgirl named Noriko, is also there to learn about cinema and the history of war. The action starts in earnest when the 13 year old Noriko falls into the Setouchi Kinema movie screen and becomes a part of the film's narrative. The three protagonists also jump into the screen, and find themselves a part of the fabric of the films they were there to watch, as they try to save people from the horrors of war.

The film is largely composed of several interlinked eras in Japanese military history, beginning with the Boshin War of 1868, moving into the Sino-Japanese War of 1894, and into the second World War, with a particular insight into the impact of the war on Okinawa, and later the impact of the Atomic Bomb drop on Hiroshima. The protagonists find themselves in various scenarios within each war.

== Cast ==
Main

- Takuro Atsuki as Mario
- Yoshihiko Hosoda as Shigeru
- Takahito Hosoyamada as Hosuke
- Rei Yoshida as Noriko
- Riko Narumi as Kazumi Saitō
- Hirona Yamazaki as Kazuko Yoshiyama
- Takako Tokiwa as Yuriko Tachibana

Others

- Tadanobu Asano as Lt. Sako
- Shinnosuke Mitsushima as Kameji
- Yukihiro Takahashi as Fanta G
- Nenji Kobayashi
- Yukihiro Takahashi
- Toshinori Omi as Kondō Isami
- Yoshikazu Ebisu as Serizawa Kamo
- Tetsuya Takeda as Sakamoto Ryōma
- Tokio Emoto as Nakaoka Shintarō
- Goro Inagaki as Ōkubo Toshimichi
- Takehiro Murata as Saigō Takamori
- Tsurutaro Kataoka as Sen no Rikyū
- Ayumi Ito as Yoshiko Kawashima
- Tōru Shinagawa as Miyamoto Musashi
- Kiyotaka Nanbara
- Hiroyuki Watanabe
- Makoto Tezuka as Ozu, a film director
- Isshin Inudo as Yamanaka, a film director
- Takashi Sasano
- Eri Watanabe
- Maiko Kawakami
- Shunsuke Kubozuka as Sadao Maruyama
- Kayoko Shiraishi
- Toshie Negishi
- Wakaba Irie
- Hiroshi Inuzuka

== Production ==
In 2016, Nobuhiko Obayashi was diagnosed with stage-four terminal cancer. Despite this, he wrote and directed Hanagatami (2017), and decided to start production on Labyrinth of Cinema after Hanagatami was completed. While filming and editing Labyrinth of Cinema, Obayashi was receiving treatment for his cancer.

== Critical reception ==
On the review aggregator website Rotten Tomatoes, 93% of 30 critics' reviews are positive, with an average rating of 7/10. The website's consensus reads: "Ambitious to a fault, Labyrinth of Cinema concludes writer-director Nobuhiko Ôbayashi's career on an epic, immersive high note." Deborah Young of The Hollywood Reporter referred to Labyrinth of Cinema as "Nobuhiko Obayashi's opus", calling it "exuberantly shot" and "imaginatively edited". Mark Schilling of Variety wrote that the film has Obayashi's "characteristic blend of surreal whimsy and heartfelt emotion."
