= Casting Blossoms to the Sky =

- Film poster

Japanese name
- Kanji: この空の花 長岡花火物語
Transcriptions
- Revised Hepburn: Kono sora no hana: Nagaoka hanabi monogatari
- Directed by: Nobuhiko Obayashi
- Written by: Nobuhiko Obayashi; Kōji Hasegawa
- Starring: Yasuko Matsuyuki; Masahiro Takashima; Masao Kusakari
- Cinematography: Yudai Kato; Hisaki Sanbongi
- Edited by: Nobuhiko Obayashi; Hisaki Sanbongi
- Music by: Joe Hisaishi; Kosuke Yamashita
- Production company: PSC
- Distributed by: Toho
- Release date: 7 April 2012 (Japan)
- Running time: 160 minutes
- Country: Japan
- Language: Japanese

Casting Blossoms to the Sky (Japanese: この空の花 長岡花火物語, Hepburn: Kono sora no hana: Nagaoka hanabi monogatari) is a 2012 Japanese drama film directed by Nobuhiko Ôbayashi.

== Premise ==
In the aftermath of the 2011 Tōhoku earthquake and tsunami, a journalist is invited to Nagaoka by her ex-boyfriend, a schoolteacher who is directing a play about how the city was decimated by a WWII air raid and the 2004 Chūetsu earthquake. She travels to the city to report on the disaster and perhaps to meet the ex-boyfriend. While there, she learns about the experiences of its inhabitants and stumbles upon a stage play written by an enigmatic student. The film tells the story of the city, its people and the various Japanese views of war (past and present).

== Cast ==
- Yasuko Matsuyuki - Reiko Endo
- Masahiro Takashima - Kenichi Katayama
- Natsuki Harada -Wakako Inoue
- Minami Inomata - Motoki Hana
- Saki Terashima
- Toshio Kakei Goro Matsushita
- Naoyuki Morita
- Mansaku Ikeuchi
- Takashi Sasano Akiyoshi Muraoka
- Koji Ishikawa
- Takahito Hosoyamada
- Toshinori Omi
- Takehiro Murata
- Misako Renbutsu
- Takuro Atsuki
- Tôru Shinagawa
- Akira Emoto
- Chôei Takahashi
- Shirô Namiki
- Yuto Kobayashi
- Mayuu Kusakari
- Kanae Katsuno
- Tomoko Hoshino
- Toshie Negishi
- Shusaku Uchida
- Tsurutaro Kataoka - Makoto Nose
- Hiroshi Inuzuka - Tsurukichi Nose
- Masayuki Yui
- Bengaru
- Masao Kusakari - Jyuzaburo Hanagata
- Sumiko Fuji - Ririko Motoki
- Shiho Fujimura - Kaoru Endo
