= Hanagatami =

- Theatrical release poster
- 花筐
- Directed by: Nobuhiko Obayashi
- Written by: Nobuhiko Obayashi; Chiho Katsura
- Based on: Hanagatami by Kazuo Dan
- Produced by: Terumichi Yamazaki; Kyōko Ōbayashi
- Starring: Shunsuke Kubozuka; Shinnosuke Mitsushima; Keishi Nagatsuka; Honoka Yahagi
- Cinematography: Kujō Sanbongi
- Edited by: Nobuhiko Obayashi
- Music by: Kosuke Yamashita
- Production companies: PSC; Karatsu Film Committee
- Distributed by: Espace Sarou
- Release date: 16 December 2017 (Japan)
- Running time: 168 minutes
- Country: Japan
- Language: Japanese

Hanagatami (Japanese: 花筐; lit. "Flower Basket") is a 2017 Japanese war film directed by Nobuhiko Obayashi, based on a 1937 novel by Kazuo Dan. The film tells a story of the purity of youth beset by the chaos of war, inspired by Obayashi's own childhood. It revolves around Toshihiko, a sixteen-year-old teenager who moves in with his aunt in Karatsu, and develops friendships and romances with the inhabitants of the town as World War II rages. The film was originally conceived during the 1970s, before Obayashi made his feature film directorial debut with House (1977), but was not produced for another 40 years. Before production, Obayashi was diagnosed with stage-four cancer and was only given a few months to live.

Hanagatami received acclaim, garnering numerous awards, including the Best Film Award at the 72nd Mainichi Film Awards. It was praised for its exuberant and vibrant visuals, its experimental and psychedelic direction and editing, its strong anti-war message and its sense of personalness. It is the third installment in a thematic trilogy of modern anti-war films by Obayashi, along with Casting Blossoms to the Sky (2012) and Seven Weeks (2014).

== Plot ==
In the spring of 1941, sixteen-year-old Toshihiko leaves Amsterdam to attend school in Karatsu, a small town on the western coast of Japan, where his aunt Keiko cares for his ailing cousin Mina. Immersed in the seaside's nature and culture, Toshihiko soon befriends the town's other extraordinary adolescents as they all contend with the war's inescapable gravitational pull.

== Cast ==
- Shunsuke Kubozuka as Toshihiko Sakakiyama (榊山 俊彦, Sakakiyama Toshihiko)
- Shinnosuke Mitsushima as Ukai (鵜飼)
- Keishi Nagatsuka as Kira (吉良)
- Tokio Emoto as Aso (阿蘇)
- Honoka Yahagi as Mina Ema (江馬 美那, Ema Mina)
- Hirona Yamazaki as Akine (あきね)
- Mugi Kadowaki as Chitose (千歳)
- Takako Tokiwa as Keiko Ema (江馬 恵子, Ema Keiko)
- Takehiro Murata as Professor Yamauchi (山内教授)
- Tetsuya Takeda as Dr. Ichijo (一条医師)
