= Hiroshi Inuzuka =

Japanese actor and comedian (1929–2023)

- Born: 23 March 1929; Tokyo, Japan
- Died: 27 October 2023 (aged 94)
- Occupations: Comedian, actor, guitarist, bassist
- Years active: 1955–2019

Hiroshi Inuzuka (犬塚 弘, Inuzuka Hiroshi; 23 March 1929 – 27 October 2023) was a Japanese actor, comedian and bassist. Inuzuka was one of the members of the Crazy Cats.

His first starring role in the film was in Suteki na Konban wa directed by Yoshitarō Nomura and played the leading roles in six films in his acting career. Inuzuka announced his retirement as an actor and made his final appearance in Labyrinth of Cinema directed by Nobuhiko Obayashi in 2019. He then retired to Atami.

Hiroshi Inuzuka died on 27 October 2023, at the age of 94.

== Selected works ==
=== Films ===
- Ten Dark Women (1961)
- Crazy Adventure (1965)
- Suteki na Konban wa (1965)
- Kyu-chan no Dekkai Yume (1967)
- Where Spring Comes Late (1970)
- Tora-san, the Good Samaritan (1971) as Policeman
- Daigoro vs. Goliath (1972) as Ojisan
- Preparation for the Festival (1975)
- Yakyū-kyō no Uta (1977)
- Stage-Struck Tora-san (1978)
- Tora-san, the Matchmaker (1979) as Taxi driver
- Tora-san's Dream of Spring (1979)
- Tora-san's Promise (1981) as Shigeru
- Eijanaika (1981) as Yomome no Roku
- Samurai Reincarnation (1981) as Sōgorō
- Aiko 16 sai (1983) as Mita Shirō
- Kaisha monogatari: Memories of You (1988) as Inuyama Hiroshi
- Kazeno Kodomono Yōni (1992) as Shigeyuki Mineyama
- Kamen Rider ZO (1993) as Seikichi Mochizuki
- Tora-san to the Rescue (1995) as taxi driver
- A Class to Remember IV (2000) as Shukichi
- Women in the Mirror (2003)
- Goodbye Me (2007) as Konosuke Saitō
- Chameleon (2008) as Shuji Yamamura
- Tsure ga Utsu ni Narimashite (2011) as Kawaji
- Casting Blossoms to the Sky (2012) as Tsurukichi Nose
- Giovanni's Island (2014)
- Labyrinth of Cinema (2019)

=== Television ===
- Shin Hissatsu Shiokinin (1977) (ep.18) as Sanai Hattori
- Hattori Hanzō: Kage no Gundan (1980) as Ikoma
- Shin Hissatsu Shigotonin (1981) (ep.25) as Hidaka
- Onihei Hankachō Ryusei (1990)
- Kokoro (2003) as Sadao Yoshikawa
- Ultraman Max (2005) (ep.26)
- Ohisama (2011) as Takeo Miyamoto
