= Katsuhide Motoki =

Japanese film director and producer (born 1963)

Katsuhide Motoki (本木 克英, Motoki Katsuhide; born 6 December 1963) is a Japanese film director and producer.

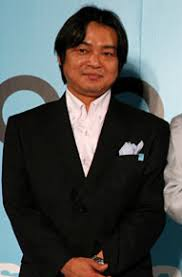
Katsuhide Motoki, is a Japanese film director and producer.

== Filmography ==
=== Director ===
==== Film ====
- Tenamonya Sōsha (1998)
- Tsuribaka Nisshi Eleven (2000)
- Tsuribaka Nisshi 12: Shijō Saidai no Yukyū Kyūka (2001)
- Tsuribaka Nisshi 13: Hama-chan Kiki Ippatsu! (2002)
- Drugstore Girl (2004)
- Kitaro (2007)
- GeGeGe no Kitaro 2: Sennen Noroi Uta (2008)
- Kamogawa Horumo (2009)
- Welcome Home, Hayabusa (2012)
- It All Began When I Met You (2013)
- Samurai Hustle (2014)
- Samurai Hustle Returns (2016)
- Recall (2018)
- Ninja Drones? (2019)
- Iwane: Sword of Serenity (2019)
- Angry Rice Wives (2021)
- Shylock's Children (2023)
- Curling Dream (2024)
- The Bird Is Calling (2025)
- Never Guilty (2026)
- Samurai Hustle: Full Throttle (2027)

==== TV drama ====
- Tange Sazen (2004)
- Maison Ikkoku (2007)

=== Producer ===
- Gonin (1995)
- Niji o Tsukamu Otoko (1996)

=== Actor ===
- What's a Film Director? (2006), as himself
