= Takako Tokiwa =

Japanese actress (born 1972)

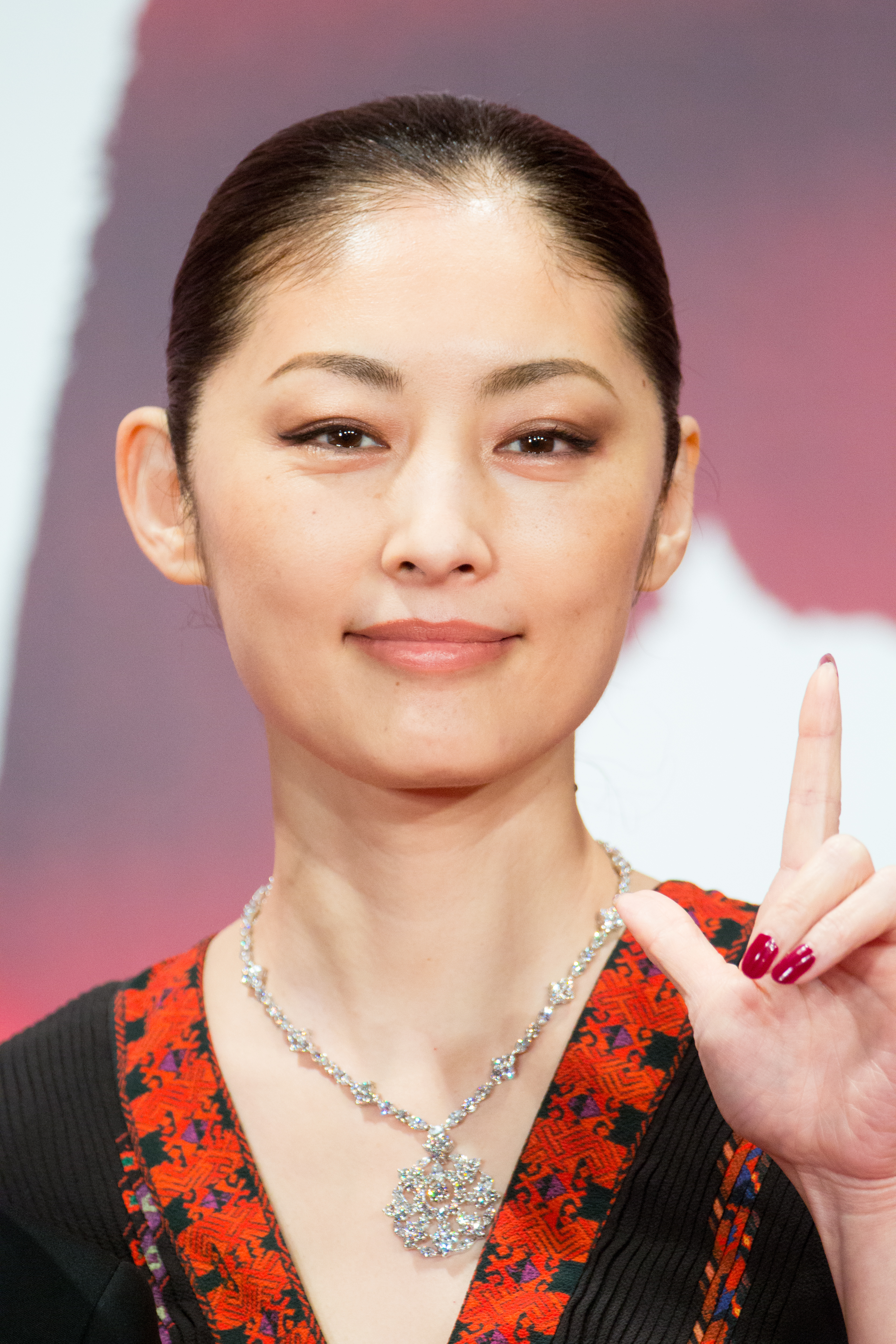
- Tokiwa at the 2017 Tokyo International Film Festival
- Born: April 30, 1972 (age 53); Yokohama, Kanagawa Prefecture, Japan
- Occupation: Actress
- Years active: 1991–present
- Spouse: Keishi Nagatsuka (m. 2009)

Takako Tokiwa (常盤 貴子, Tokiwa Takako; born 30 April 1972 in Yokohama, Kanagawa Prefecture) is a Japanese actress.

== Career ==
Tokiwa was nominated for the "Best Actress" award at the Japanese Academy Awards in 2005 for her performance in Akai Tsuki.

She co-starred with Hidetoshi Nishijima in Amir Naderi's 2011 film Cut.

== Filmography ==
=== Film ===
- Moonlight Express (1999)
- A Fighter's Blues (2000)
- Sennen no Koi Story of Genji (2001)
- Get Up! (2003)
- Akai Tsuki (2004)
- Shining Boy & Little Randy (2005)
- Mamiya kyodai (2006)
- Brave Story (2006)
- Metro ni Notte (2006)
- Awakening (2007)
- 20th Century Boys: Beginning of the End (2008)
- 20th Century Boys: The Last Hope (2009)
- 20th Century Boys: Redemption (2009)
- Tsuribaka Nisshi 19 (2008)
- After School (2008)
- Listen to My Heart (2009)
- Dirty Hearts (2011)
- Cut (2011)
- Seven Weeks (2014), Nobuko Shimizu
- Dareka no Mokkin (2016)
- Hanagatami (2017)
- Kodomo Shokudō (2018)
- Kikyo – The Return (2019)
- Labyrinth of Cinema (2020), Yuriko Tachibana
- Perfect Strangers (2021)
- Ware Yowakereba: Yajima Kajiko-den (2022), Yajima Kajiko
- The Lump In My Heart (2023)
- Ranpo no Gen'ei (2024), Fuyō
- My Mom, My Angel: A Journey of Love and Acceptance (2024)

=== Television ===
- Eve wa Hatsukoi no Yoni (1991)
- Taiheiki (1991)
- Ai wa Doda (1992)
- Junen ai (1992)
- Akuma no Kiss (1993)
- The Wide Show (1994)
- Coming Home (1994)
- Watashi no Unmei (1994–1995)
- Kinjirareta Asobi (1995)
- Tell Me That You Love Me (1995)
- Mada koi wa Hajimaranai (1995)
- Minikui Hhiru no Ko (1996)
- Mahiru no Tsuki (1996)
- Hitori Gurashi (1996)
- Risou no Kekkon (1997)
- Saigo no Koi (1997)
- Meguriai (1998)
- Tabloid (1998)
- Utsukushii Hito (1999)
- Kabachitare (2000)
- Beautiful Life (2000)
- The Long Love Letter (2002)
- Renai Hensachi (2002)
- Ryuten no Ohi: Saigo no Kotei (2003)
- The Hit Parade (2006)
- Gyokuran (2007)
- Bizan (2007)
- Life in Additional Time (2008)
- Tenchijin (2009)
- Kamisama no Nyobo (2011)
- Mare (2015)
- The Good Wife (Japanese TV series) (2019)
- The Makanai: Cooking for the Maiko House (2023)

== Awards ==
- 20th Elan d'or Awards: Newcomer of the Year
