= Natsuki Harada =

Japanese actress

Natsuki Harada 原田 夏希
- Born: July 7, 1984 (age 42); Shizuoka, Japan
- Occupation: Actress
- Years active: 2001–present
- Agent: Oscar Promotion
- Height: 1.68 m (5 ft 6 in)
- Spouse: unknown (m. 2016)
- Children: 3

Natsuki Harada (原田 夏希; born July 7, 1984) is a Japanese actress. She played the lead female role in NHK's 2004 TV Asadora drama Wakaba.

== Filmography ==
=== Films ===
| Year | Title | Role | Ref |
|---|---|---|---|
| 2001 | Koko ni Irukoto | Megumi Kadokura | |
| 2006 | Cherry Pie (チェリーパイ) | Takagi bun | |
| 2007 | Sumairu seiya no kiseki (スマイル 聖夜の奇跡) | | |
| 2008 | Iesutadeizu (イエスタデイズ) | Mio Mayama (32 years ago) | |
| 2008 | Sonohi no Maeni (その日のまえに) | | |
| 2009 | I Give My First Love to You | Teru Uehara | |
| 2012 | Kono Sora no Hana: Nagaoka Hanabi Monogatari (この空の花 長岡花火物語) | Wakako Inoue | |
| 2012 | Nazotoki wa Dinner no Ato de Special | | |
| 2013 | Gokudo no Tsuma-tachi Neo (極道の妻たち Neo) | Azami Kato | |
| 2014 | Ichijiku no Mori (無花果の森) | Izumi | |
| 2014 | Seven Weeks | | |
| 2017 | Fullmetal Alchemist | Gracia Hughes | |

=== Television movies ===
| Year | Title | Role |
|---|---|---|
| 2006 | Yonimo Kimyona Monogatari 2006 Aki no Tokubetsuhen | |
| 2007 | Attention Please 2007 Special | Risa Nakata |
| 2009 | Rakujitsu Moyu | |

=== Drama series ===
| Year | Title | English Translation | Role | Network |
|---|---|---|---|---|
| 2004 | Wakaba | | Takahara Wakaba | NHK |
| 2005 | Yankee Bokou ni Kaeru Special | Drop-out Teacher Returns to School Special | | TBS |
| 2006 | Izumo no Okuni | | Okiku | NHK |
| 2006 | Kurosagi | The Black Swindler | Yoshiko Takahashi (ep.7) | TBS |
| 2007 | Hanazakari no Kimitachi e | Ikemen Paradise | Kanao Tanabe | Fuji TV |
| 2008 | Hachimitsu to Clover (ハチミツとクローバー) | Honey and Clover | Ayumi Yamada | Fuji TV |
| 2010 | Nihonjin No Shiranai Nihongo | The Japanese The Japanese Don't Know | Miyuki Katori | |
| 2013 | Ooka Echizen | | | NHK |
| 2013 | Kagi no nai Yume wo Miru | Having a Dream Without a Key | (ep.5) | WOWOW |
