= The Go Masters =

1982 film directed by Junya Sato and Duan Jishun

- Film poster
- Directed by: Jun'ya Satō; Duan Jishun
- Written by: Fumio Kannami; Yasuko Ohno; Tetsuro Abe; Lee Hongzhou; Kuzu Kodong
- Produced by: Masahiro Sato; Wang Zhimin
- Starring: Rentarō Mikuni; Keiko Matsuzaka; Misako Konno; Sun Daolin; Nobuko Otowa
- Cinematography: Shohei Ando
- Edited by: Akira Suzuki
- Music by: Hikaru Hayashi
- Production companies: The Go Masters Production Committee; Toko Tokuma; Beijing Film Factory
- Distributed by: Toho
- Release date: September 15, 1982 (Japan)
- Running time: 130 minutes
- Country: Japan
- Language: Japanese

The Go Masters (Japanese: 未完の対局, Hepburn: Mikan no taikyoku) is a 1982 Japanese-Chinese epic film co-production directed by Junya Sato and Duan Jishun (段吉順). It won the Grand Prix des Amériques, the main prize at the Montreal World Film Festival. Toho released The Go Masters on September 15, 1982, in Japan.

== Cast ==
- Rentarō Mikuni as Rinsaku Matsunami
- Keiko Matsuzaka
- Misako Konno as Tomoe
- Sun Daolin as Kuang Yishan
- Nobuko Otowa
- Tsukasa Ito
- Junichi Ishida
- Shen Guanchu as Kuang Aming
- Shen Danping as Xiong Ahui
- Mayumi Ogawa
- Huang Zongying as Kuang Yuanzhi
- Du Peng as Guan Xiaochuan
- Yu Shaoking as Dr. Zhang
- Yoshiko Mita
- Liu Xin
- Hideji Ōtaki
- Zhang Liwei as Xiao Ahui
