= Ryūzō Saki =

Japanese writer (1937–2015)

- 佐木 隆三
- Born: Ryozo Kosaki; April 14, 1937; Onsong County, North Hamgyong Province, Korea under Japanese rule
- Died: October 31, 2015 (aged 78); Kitakyushu, Fukuoka Prefecture, Japan
- Occupations: Non-fiction writer; Honorary director of the Kitakyushi City Museum of Literature; Former visiting professor at Kyushu International University
- Writing career
- Language: Japanese
- Years active: 1961–2015
- Genre: Non-fiction novel
- Notable works: Vengeance is Mine (復讐するは我にあり, Fukushū suru wa Ware ni ari)
- Notable awards: 74th Naoki Prize

Japanese name
- Kanji: 佐木 隆三
- Kana: さき りゅうぞう
Transcriptions
- Romanization: Saki Ryūzō

Ryūzō Saki (佐木 隆三, Saki Ryūzō; April 14, 1937 – October 31, 2015) was a Japanese novelist and non-fiction writer, born in North Hamgyong, a province of what is now North Korea. He was interested in high-profile crimes in Japan and published a number of non-fiction books about Japanese crimes.

On January 14, 1976, Saki was awarded the Naoki Prize for the novel Vengeance Is Mine based on Japanese serial killer Akira Nishiguchi. The novel became the basis of Shohei Imamura's film Vengeance Is Mine. He also wrote the books about Norio Nagayama, Tsutomu Miyazaki, Fusako Sano and Futoshi Matsunaga. His 1980 novel The Miracle of Joe, the Petrel was adapted into a feature film in 1984 by Toshiya Fujita.

In 1992, Saki published a book about Japanese Resident-General of Korea Itō Hirobumi and Korean An Jung-geun, titled Itō Hirobumi to An Jung-geun.

On 1 November 2015, he died from throat cancer in Kitakyūshū at age 78.
