= Toshinori Omi =

Japanese actor

- 尾美としのり
- Born: December 7, 1965 (age 60); Tokyo, Japan
- Occupation: Actor
- Years active: 1973–present

Toshinori Omi (尾美としのり, Omi Toshinori; born December 7, 1965) is a Japanese actor.

== Career ==
Born in Tokyo, Omi joined the children's theater troupe Himawari Theatre Group when he was still in kindergarten. He made his film debut at age 13 in Kon Ichikawa's Hi no Tori (1978) and got his first starring role in a film with Shinji Somai's Tonda Couple (1980). He starred in Nobuhiko Obayashi's Tenkosei (1982), for which he won a Japan Academy Prize best newcomer award. He appeared in most of Obayashi's films until the mid-1990s. Since then he has moved on to adult roles, playing white collar businessmen and fathers.

== Selected filmography ==
=== Film ===
- Hi no Tori (1978), Nagi
- Tonda Couple (1980), Nakayama, Wataru
- I Are You, You Am Me (1982), Kazuo Saitoh
- The Girl Who Leapt Through Time (1983), Goro Horikawa
- Haishi (1984), Saburoh
- Itsuka darekaga korosareru (1984), Shota Watakabe
- Lonely Heart (1985), Hiroki Inoue
- Typhoon Club (1985), Kobayashi
- Love Hotel (1985), Assistant director
- Four Sisters (1985), Ryou Sakura
- Rokumeikan (1986), Kenjiro, Einosuke's son
- Noyuki yamayuki umibe yuki (1986), Yuuta Hayami
- Makeup (1987)
- Hachiko Monogatari (1987), Ogata
- Nihon junjo-den okashina futari (1988), Hitman
- Hope and Pain (1988), Arles, Sadaichi Takai
- Revolver (1988), Arata Nagai
- Watashi no kokoro wa papa no mono (1988), Yuuki Matsushita
- Bakayarô! 2: Shiawase ni naritai (1989), Tamotsu Yoriai (Episode 3)
- Byôin e ikô (1990), Sasazo
- Inamura Jên (1990), Satoru
- Isan sôzoku (1990), Kazuhito Fujishima
- Chizuko's Younger Sister (1991), Tomoya Kaminaga
- Ryakudatsu ai (1991)
- Tsuribaka Nisshi 4 (1991), Kazuhiko Usami
- Tōki Rakujitsu (1992)
- Okoge (1992)
- Seishun dendekedekedeke (1992), Sugimoto Fujiwara
- Haruka, nosutarujii (1993), Noburu Ohta
- Onna-zakari (1994), Tamaru's secretary
- Nozokiya (1995), Matsumiya
- Ashita (1995), Megumi's Teacher
- Onihei hankachô (1995)
- Miyazawa Kenji sono ai (1995), Fujiwara
- Happy People (1997)
- Ikinai (1998), Kimura
- Kaza-hana (2000), Nightclub manager
- Stacy: Attack of the Schoolgirl Zombies (2001), Shibukawa
- The Twilight Samurai (2002), Shichijuro Otsuka
- Kusa no ran (2004)
- Koi no mon (2004)
- Umezu Kazuo: Kyôfu gekijô- Negai (2005), Yoshiro
- Arigatô (2006), Kenta Arino
- I Just Didn't Do It (2006)
- Sekai wa tokidoki utsukushii (2006), Customer
- Kôan keisatsu sôsakan (2007)
- The Triumphant of General Rouge (2009), Keiji Mifune
- Wasao (2011)
- Itsukaichi Monogatari (2011)
- Kono sora no hana: Nagaoka hanabi monogatari (2012), Tadahiko
- Megamisama (2017)
- The Negotiator: Behind The Reversion of Okinawa (2018), Fumio Ishino
- 37 Seconds (2019)
- Peer (2019), Terunobu Kuramatsu
- Labyrinth of Cinema (2020), Kondō Isami
- Rika: Love Obsessed Psycho (2021)
- Tombi: Father and Son (2022)
- Wedding High (2022)
- The Zen Diary (2022), Takashi
- My Broken Mariko (2022), Mariko's father
- Roleless (2022)
- The Legend and Butterfly (2023), Hirate Masahide
- Confess to Your Crimes (2023)
- Oshi no Ko: The Final Act (2024), Toshiro Kindaichi
- Secret: A Hidden Score (2024), Tōru Higuchi
- Shinpei (2025), Masakazu Oka
- Salary Man Kintaro (2025), Morinosuke Yamato
- Salary Man Kintaro 2 (2025), Morinosuke Yamato
- Rewrite (2025), Hosoda
- A Place Called Home (2026)
- The Ogre's Bride (2026)
- Bye Bye Love: Detective Is in the Bar (2026), Shigeo Nakata

=== Television ===
- Kusa Moeru (1979), young Hōjō Yasutoki
- Hōjō Tokimune (2001), Ashikaga Yoriuji
- At Home Dad (2004)
- Kekkon Dekinai Otoko (2006), Nakagawa Yoshio
- Ryūsei no Kizuna (2008), Hayashi George
- Teppan (2010)
- Ariadne no Dangan (2011), Jōichirō Kitayama
- Taira no Kiyomori (2012), Taira no Koretsuna
- Amachan (2013), Masamune Kurokawa
- Akira and Akira (2017), Toshio Kitamura
- Naotora: The Lady Warlord (2017), Sakakibara Yasumasa
- The Negotiator: Behind The Reversion of Okinawa (2017)
- Everyone's Demoted (2019), Takashi Umehara
- Awaiting Kirin (2020), Toki Yorinori
- Pareto's Miscalculation (2020)
- The Supporting Actors 3 (2021), Himself
- Yū-san no Nyōbō (2021), Masahiko Kobayashi
- Kamen Rider Black Sun (2022), Isao Nimura
- The Makanai: Cooking for the Maiko House (2023)
- Oshi no Ko (2024), Toshiro Kindaichi
- Unbound (2025), Hirasawa Tsunemasa
- Zenigata Heiji (2026)
- Did Someone Happen to Mention Me? (2026)
