= Sayuri (manga) =

Horror manga series

サユリ (Sayuri)
- Genre: Horror
- Created by: Rensuke Oshikiri
- Manga
- Written by: Rensuke Oshikiri
- Published by: Gentosha Comics
- English publisher: NA: Kodansha USA
- Imprint: Bird Comics
- Magazine: Monthly Birz
- Original run: January 30, 2010 – March 30, 2011
- Volumes: 2
- Live-action film

House of Sayuri
- Directed by: Koji Shiraishi
- Produced by: Kimiaki Tasaka; Shigeyuki Komatsu; Ami Miyake; Takeshi Date; Saki Anyoji
- Music by: Toru Ishizuka; Shunsuke Suzuki; Senri Tai
- Studio: Tohokushinsha Film
- Released: August 23, 2024
- Runtime: 108 minutes

Sayuri (サユリ) is a Japanese manga series by Rensuke Oshikiri, it was serialized in Gentosha's Monthly Birz from January 2010 to March 2011.

A live action film adaptation was released in 2024.

== Plot ==
The Kamiki family - a family of seven - moves into a detached house in the suburbs overlooking the sea. Akio Kamiki’s eldest son, Norio, in his third year of junior high and excited about life in the new house, was soon horror stricken by the sudden death of his father. Furthermore, various strange phenomena appear inside the house, as Norio’s grandfather (Shozo) and older sister (Kyoko), who had sensed the phenomena firsthand, become exhausted and delirious. Norio's classmate (Sumida) is spiritually sensitive and shows interest in Norio, convinced Norio can see female spirits. Eventually, at midnight, Norio’s younger brother (Shun) disappears mysteriously. Afterwards, Shozo dies suddenly, and Keiko disappears in front of Norio and his family. Finally, Norio’s mother (Masako), whose mind was broken, hung herself. When Norio discovers the corpse of his mother, her body vanishes like smoke before his eyes.

Norio mentally deteriorates upon realizing the presence of evil spirits haunting the house. Regaining her former strength, Grandmother declares war against "something" that has taken away her family. She helps Norio overcome his dread by emphasizing the need to strengthen his life essence through exercise and diet and by acting bravely. Norio begins to believe that if his heart weakens, he will be killed, and thus strengthens his resolve to resists vengeful spirits.

The vengeful spirits begin to exploit the mental gaps between the narratives of Norio and his grandmother, showing various strange phenomena to frighten them. Though difficult, the two overcome them.

Grandmother suffers nightmares featuring Shozo telling her to dig in a specific spot in the yard. She and Norio discover the body of a girl named Sayuri Kujo, uncovering the true identity of the vengeful spirit cursing the house. Grandmother vows revenge, promising to make Sayuri pay for taking her family.

Grandmother leaves town to “investigate something”, leaving Norio to care for the house alone. Sumida rushes to the scene, and while the two keep watch over the house, Sayuri sees Grandmother’s absence as an opportunity to finish Norio and Sumida.

At midnight, she Sayuri succeeds in kidnapping the frightened Norio and Sumida as spirited souls. At that moment, the Grandmother (who kidnapped and brought back the family who killed Sayuri) torments SayurI’s family as if to show off to and demands that Norio be returned. Sayuri's deep feelings for her family stirred her into acquiescence. Suffering as she returned the bodies of Shun and Keiko, Sayuri's weakened and shrunken soul is taken to the afterlife by the spirits of the Kamiki family members she killed.

Norio shows anger at the unfairness, but Grandmother lectures him on the responsibility of the living. Norio discovers Sumita, who has also been sent back to the living world.

In the epilogue, the Kujo family's past murders are made public, and the cursed house is demolished. Norio moves into a new home with his Grandmother (now suffering from dementia) and tells Sumida that he will live his life to the best from now on.

== Characters ==
Norio Kamiki (神木 則雄, Kamiki Norio)
Played by Minamide Ryoka
The protagonist of this story. The eldest son of the Kamiki family (the second of three siblings) and a third-year middle school student. He has a spirited personality and was happy to move from their cramped apartment to a spacious, albeit inconvenient, house. Since the move, he has been suspicious of his family's deteriorating behavior. Though he is aware of the various supernatural phenomena occurring, he remains resilient.

Grandma (ばあちゃん, Baa-chan)
Played by Toshie Negishi
Norio’s grandmother. Her given name is unknown (in the film version, she is Harue Kamiki (神木 春枝 (Kamiki Harue))). Once known for her fierce temper, she now suffers from advanced dementia and is quite docile. Immediately after the rest of the family disappears, leaving Norio behind, she regains her sanity and displays her former vigor. She teaches Norio the secret to "thickening one's life force" and, determined to avenge her family, utilizes every possible means to exact revenge on the entity lurking in the house (Sayuri).

Nao Sumida (住田 奈緒, Sumida Nao)
Played by Hana Kondo
Norio’s classmate and a student in the adjacent class. She possesses spiritual sensitivity and notices the presence of the female spirit haunting Norio's house, leading her to worry about his well-being.

Shun Kamiki (神木 俊, Kamiki Shun)
Played by Rei Inomata
Norio’s younger brother (the second son) and a fifth-grade elementary student. Unlike his assertive older siblings, he is introverted, reserved, and timid. He preferred the apartment they lived in before the move. Frightened by his family's strange behavior, he spends most of his time with Norio, who remains sane. One night, while sleeping in the same room as Norio, he suddenly vanishes, leaving his clothes and shoes behind.

Keiko Kamiki (神木 径子, Kamiki Keiko)
Played by Morita Sou
Norio’s older sister (the eldest daughter) and a high school student. She dreams of eventually moving out and living on her own. She has a strong, assertive personality. After moving, she begins shutting herself in her room and acting erratically. Amidst the gloom following Shozo’s sudden death, she suddenly bites off her own tongue and, while writhing in agony, crawls out of the house and goes missing.

Akio Kamiki (神木 昭雄, Kamiki Akio)
Played by Zen Kajihara
Norio’s father. Just as he fulfills his long-held dream of buying a home and living with his parents, he dies suddenly.

Masako Kamiki (神木 正子, Kamiki Masako)
Played by Fusako Urabe
Norio’s mother. Unable to bear the misfortunes befalling her family, she eventually hangs herself in front of Norio. Afterward, her body vanishes without a trace.

Shozo Kamiki (神木 章造, Kamiki Shozo)
Played by Kitaro (actor)
Norio’s grandfather. Frightened by something, he collapses in the garden and is taken to the hospital. Immediately upon returning home after being discharged, he collapses again and dies. The cause of death is heart failure.

Sayuri Kujo (九城 小百合, Kujo Sayuri)
Played by Haruka Kubo, Nonoka Terui (young)
The true form of the vengeful spirit haunting the house. The eldest daughter of the original owners, the Kujo family. She was a recluse who subjected her family to violence; eventually, unable to endure it any longer, her family killed her and buried her body in the garden. Driven by deep resentment, she became a malicious vengeful spirit, repeatedly murdering the families that move into the house.

Natsuhiko Kujo (九城 夏彦, Kujo Natsuhiko)
Played by Ryo Ikeda
Sayuri’s father. He turned a blind eye even as Sayuri became a recluse and the household fell into ruin because of her. Following an incident where his second daughter, Kana, stabbed Sayuri, he ultimately took matters into his own hands and buried her body, along with her belongings, in the garden. He then vacated the house and lived in another town with the remaining three members of his family.

Misato Kujo (九城 美里, Kujo Misato)
Played by Aki Morita
Sayuri’s mother. She continued to cook for Sayuri, even knowing she would not touch it, and was deeply concerned for her. However, in the end, she helped her husband commit the murder by holding Sayuri down, making her complicit in the killing.

Kana Kujo (九城 香奈, Kujo Kana)
Played by Saya Imashiro, Moeka Yoshida (young)
Sayuri’s younger sister. She despised her older sister for becoming a recluse and causing trouble for the family. When she tried to stop Sayuri from assaulting their mother, she stabbed her with a knife in an act of retaliation.

== Media ==
=== Manga ===
Written and illustrated by Rensuke Oshikiri, Sayuri was serialized in Gentosha's Monthly Birz magazine from January 2010 to March 2011, totaling 14 chapters. The series was collected in 2 tankōbon volumes.

In February 2025, Kodansha USA announced that they had licensed the series for an English release. They released an omnibus containing both volumes on January 27, 2026.

No.	Original release date	Original ISBN	English release date	English ISBN
1	September 24, 2010	978-4-344-82038-8	January 27, 2026	978-1647295073 (print); 978-1647295141 (digital)
2	May 24, 2011	978-4-344-82224-5	January 27, 2026	978-1647295073 (print); 978-1647295141 (digital)

=== Movie ===
In March 2024, Gentosha announced that the manga would receive a live film adaptation by Kōji Shiraishi. The author, Oshikiri himself, joined the production team. Ryōka Minamide was cast as the films protagonist. A teaser trailer was released on April 25, 2024 announcing the further cast. The official trailer was released on August 22 in order to announce the films release the next day. The film was released on August 23, 2024, as well in 13 Southeast Asian countries.

The bonus item included with the movie ticket cards sold from June 21, 2024, features an original illustration drawn by Oshikiri. The film had its world premiere at the 28th Bucheon International Fantastic Film Festival, which opened on July 4 of the same year, in the Adrenaline Ride section, which features extreme action and horror films. The film was also be screened at the 28th Fantasia International Film Festival, which was held from July 18 to August 4 of the same year.

The film was distributed by Showgate.
