= Yumiko Fujita =

Japanese actress (born 1945)

- Born: September 12, 1945 (age 80); Tokyo, Japan
- Occupation: Actor
- Years active: 1967–present

Yumiko Fujita (藤田 弓子; born 12 September 1945 in Meguro, Tokyo, Japan) is a Japanese actress.

== Selected filmography ==
=== Film ===
- If You Were Young: Rage (1970)
- Under the Flag of the Rising Sun (1972)
- Karafuto 1945 Summer Hyosetsu no Mon (1974)
- The Bullet Train (1975)
- Muddy River (1981)
- Aiko 16 sai (1983)
- Time and Tide (1983)
- Seburi monogatari (1985)
- Lonely Heart (1985)
- Chizuko's Younger Sister (1991)
- Drugstore Girl (2003)
- Glory to the Filmmaker! (2007)
- Golden Orchestra (2016)
- What Happened to Our Nest Egg!? (2021)
- Do Unto Others (2023)
- Kamaishi Ramen Monogatari (2023)

=== Television ===
- Ghost Soup (1992)
- At Home Dad (2004)
