= Chōchin (film) =

- Film poster
- Directed by: Shunichi Kajima
- Written by: Goro Hanawa
- Based on: Chochin by Shōji Kaneko
- Produced by: Goro Sakurai; Takeshi Motomura; Harumichi Otani; Kazuyuki Sato
- Starring: Takanori Jinnai; Eri Ishida; Yoshio Harada; Mariko Kaga; Masayuki Watanabe
- Cinematography: Tatsuo Suzuki
- Edited by: Kiyoaki Saito
- Music by: Evan Lurie
- Production companies: Kosaido Production; Vanfiru Co., Ltd.
- Distributed by: Toei
- Release date: May 23, 1987 (Japan)
- Running time: 100 minutes
- Country: Japan
- Language: Japanese
- Box office: ¥300 million

Chōchin (Japanese: ちょうちん), also known as Paper Lantern, is a 1987 Japanese crime drama film directed by Shunichi Kajima. It is an adaptation of a novel by Shōji Kaneko, who died of cancer four years prior to the film's production. The screenplay was written by Goro Hanawa. It stars Takanori Jinnai in the lead role, alongside Eri Ishida, Yoshio Harada and Mariko Kaga. Toei released Chōchin on May 23, 1987, in Japan, where it was a financial success.

== Premise ==
A new wave yakuza film in which Takanori Jinnai plays a young yakuza suffering from stomach cancer who has very little time left to live.

== Cast ==
- Takanori Jinnai as Chiaki Murata
- Eri Ishida as Shinko
- Yoshio Harada as Machida
- Mariko Kaga as Etsuko Machida
- Masayuki Watanabe as Kozo
- Takanobu Hozumi as Koshikawa
- Nenji Kobayashi as Branch Manager
- Taketoshi Naito as Motohashi
- Tsuyoshi Naito as Hanaki
- Saburō Tokitō as Masseuse
- Kazuo Andō as Hiroshi Yoshimura
- Eri Nitta as Ryoko Murata
- Hitoshi Ozawa as Tetsu
- Atsushi Natsu as Makoto
- Kenzo Miyake as Akira
- Zhao Fanghao as Ken-chan
- Kimiko Yu as Michi
- Fuwa Mansaku as Kamahachi
- Toshihachi Ito as Segawa
- Takehiko Ono as Izaki
- Ei Sato as Hirayama
- Mojiro Sato as Manager of Club Yutaka

== Awards and nominations ==
9th Yokohama Film Festival

- Won: Best Director - Shunichi Kajima (shared with Kazuo Hara)
- Won: Best Supporting Actress - Eri Ishida
- Special Jury Prize
- Best Ten List: 5th place

12th Hochi Film Awards

- Won: Best Actor – Takanori Jinnai

61st Kinema Junpo Best Ten Awards

- Best Ten List: 10th place

30th Blue Ribbon Awards

- Won: Best Actor – Takanori Jinnai

11th Japan Academy Awards

- Nominated: Outstanding Performance by an Actor in a Leading Role – Takanori Jinnai
- Nominated: Newcomer of the Year – Masayuki Watanabe
