= Akira Nishiguchi =

Japanese serial killer and fraudster

- Born: Akira Nishiguchi; December 14, 1925; Osaka, Osaka Prefecture, Japan
- Died: December 11, 1970 (aged 44); Fukuoka Detention House, Sawara-ku, Fukuoka Prefecture, Japan
- Cause of death: Execution by hanging
- Status: Executed
- Conviction: Murder (5 counts)
- Penalty: Death

Details
- Victims: 5
- Span of crimes: October 18, 1963 – December 29, 1963
- Country: Japan
- States: Fukuoka, Shizuoka, Tokyo
- Date apprehended: January 3, 1964

Akira Nishiguchi (西口 彰, Nishiguchi Akira; December 14, 1925 – December 11, 1970) was a Japanese serial killer and fraudster who murdered five people in late 1963. The focus of a national manhunt, Nishiguchi's crime spree came to an end in January 1964 when he was identified by the 10-year-old daughter of a potential victim. He was sentenced to death upon conviction and was hanged in 1970.

Nishiguchi's crimes and the circumstances of his capture were the direct catalyst for the creation of the Japanese "Metropolitan Designated Case" system. Nishiguchi also left an impact on Japanese media, becoming the basis of a book by Ryuzo Saki, which itself was adapted into the film Vengeance Is Mine (1979).

== Early life ==
Akira Nishiguchi was born on 14 December 1925 in Osaka, Osaka Prefecture, Japan. His parents, both devout Catholics, were the proprietors of a fishing business on the Gotō Islands, off the western coast of Kyūshū. Because of his family's religious beliefs, Nishiguchi was pressured by his father to enter the priesthood when he came of age and was sent to a Catholic mission school in Fukuoka Prefecture for his secondary education. Unable to bear the school's strict discipline, he dropped out during his third year and ran away. To support himself, he embarked on a life of crime.

== Criminal history ==
In 1942, five months after leaving the mission school, Nishiguchi was arrested in Beppu for robbery. While he was able to avoid a criminal charge, he was placed in an institution for juvenile offenders. Upon being given a temporary release in 1945, following the end of World War II, Nishiguchi returned to Osaka and studied English at a training school in the hopes of becoming an interpreter for Allied servicemen. As he continued his incarceration, he married a 20-year-old woman from Fukuoka; the woman gave birth to a son soon after his release from prison in 1947.

Nishiguchi resumed his criminal activity and, taking advantage of his education in English, began extorting local businesses while claiming to be affiliated with the US occupation forces. He was soon arrested and sentenced to two years' imprisonment. Following his release in 1950, he partnered with a US serviceman and opened a bar in Beppu, becoming the sole owner when the serviceman was deployed to Korea. The following year, shortly before the birth of his second son, Nishiguchi was caught in possession of US currency, which was illegal under certain conditions during the occupation. He was spared prison but fined ¥4,000.

In 1952, Nishiguchi, having acquired an American military uniform and cap, posed as a Japanese-American and began luring people into a building under the pretense of selling them foreign cars, making an excuse and slipping out a rear entrance after he was handed their money. He was arrested once again and sentenced to five years' imprisonment. After he was jailed a third time for fraud in 1959, Nishiguchi's wife divorced him; however, citing the Catholic Church's rules on divorce, Nishiguchi persuaded the woman to remarry him. He was released in 1963, living separately from his wife and working as a delivery driver in Yukuhashi.

== Murders ==
=== Ikuo Murata and Goro Mori ===
In October 1963, Nishiguchi learned that Ikuo Murata, an employee for the Japan Tobacco and Salt Public Corporation, was using his (Nishiguchi's) employers' delivery vehicles to transport large sums of money along with tobacco products. Nishiguchi approached Murata, offering to help him with deliveries and lead him to a tobacco field. On 18 October the two men traveled in a car, driven by Goro Mori, to an isolated mountain road in Fukuoka Prefecture, west of Kanda railway station. There, Nishiguchi lured Murata to a secluded area, beat him to death with a hammer, and stole his money bag containing ¥260,000. He then proceeded to walk back to the car and fatally stab Mori, abandoning both vehicle and body at the Chuai Mountain Pass two kilometers away.

Despite being married, Nishiguchi was seeing a second woman. Immediately following the murders he went to the barbershop where this woman worked and impressed her with the money he had stolen. To celebrate, the pair lodged at a hotel in Shinyanagi that night. However, upon picking up a newspaper the following morning, Nishiguchi learned that police had already linked him to the killings and that he was now the focus of a nationwide manhunt. Hearing over the radio that police had believed he had fled to the Kansai region, Nishiguchi instead traveled to the small rural city of Karatsu, Saga Prefecture. There he gambled on boat races and won ¥210,000, almost doubling the amount of cash he had on hand.

To throw off authorities, Nishguchi wrote a letter addressed to Yukuhashi police expressing remorse for the murders and announcing his intention to commit suicide. Afterward he boarded a ferry bound for Tokyo and discarded several personal items on deck, including a signed will, to give the impression that he had jumped into the Seto Inland Sea. However, this plan was foiled when Nishiguchi was sighted near where the ferry had been docked.

=== Yuki and Harue Fujimi ===
Over the next few days, Nishiguchi moved constantly between Kansai and Chūbu. On 28 October 1963 he rented a room in Shizuoka using the alias "Masaoka", claiming to be a professor from Kyoto University. To keep up the ruse that he was a teacher, he wore thick glasses and a formal suit as a disguise. From his first night in Shizuoka, Nishiguchi frequently called young women and geisha to his room. The landlady, Yuki Fujimi, having been deceived by his performance as a professor, developed feelings for him and suggested that they spent the night together. Nishiguchi agreed but left his room early the following morning over Yuki's protests.

Having extravagantly spent most of his money, Nishiguchi returned to fraud to recoup his losses. He traveled to Hiroshima and purchased five television sets under the pretense of donating them to a local orphanage, stiffing the supplier and leaving the orphanage with the bill. He then pawned the television sets, netting ¥80,000.

On 14 November 1963, Nishiguchi returned to his rented room in Shizuoka, much to the delight of the landlady Yuki. Instead of lodging him in his usual room, she arranged to host Nishiguchi in her own room. After staying there for four nights, Nishiguchi strangled both Yuki and her mother, Harue Fujimi, with a rope. He quickly cleared their residence of all cash and valuables and pawned off these items for ¥40,000. The following day, posing as a representative for the Fujimis, he sold their telephone line for an extra ¥100,000 before fleeing Shizuoka.

When the bodies of Yuki and Harue were discovered on 22 November, authorities quickly found evidence pointing to Nishiguchi and doubled their efforts to capture him. Police forces around the country were put on high alert and investigators traveled to Beppu to have Nishiguchi's family members write letters urging his surrender, which were then printed in national newspapers.

Undeterred by the efforts of the police, Nishiguchi turned up in Chiba on 3 December and, pretending to be either a lawyer or an accountant, swindled a total of ¥56,000 from two middle-aged women. After stealing a lawyer's lapel badge in Fukushima, he made his way to Hokkaido and extorted ¥50,000 from a local business owner. He then traveled south to Tokyo, where he swindled ¥40,000 out of a victim who thought they were securing bail money for an imprisoned relative. Hearing about these crimes, authorities printed 5,000 wanted posters bearing Nishiguchi's mugshot and distributed them across the country.

=== Umematsu Kamiyoshi ===
While taking a train from Tochigi Prefecture to Tokyo, Nishiguchi saw a story in a newspaper concerning Tairyu Furukawa, a Buddhist priest who was campaigning for the release of death row prisoner Sakae Menda. Furukawa had served as a chaplain at the Fukuoka prison where Nishiguchi had been jailed ten years earlier; the two men had a brief encounter when Nishiguchi served tea to Furukawa.

Upon arriving in Tokyo, Nishiguchi approached Umematsu Kamiyoshi, an 81-year-old lawyer and member of Tokyo Bar Association. Noticing how wealthy he was, Nishiguchi once again claimed to be a lawyer and offered to assist Kamiyoshi in a civil case. Once Kamiyoshi invited him into his residence in Toshima, Nishiguchi strangled the elderly man with his necktie. He then ransacked Kamiyoshi's apartment–stealing his lawyer's badge, valuables and ¥140,000–and stuffed Kamiyoshi's body in a closet, where it was discovered four days later.

== Capture ==
Nishiguchi immediately fled south to Kumamoto. There, on 2 January 1964, he visited the Ryugan-ji Temple and introduced himself to Furukawa, the temple's chief priest, introducing himself as "Kawamura" and claiming to be a lawyer interested in aiding Furukawa's campaign for Menda's release. Furukawa, not recognizing Nishiguchi from their previous encounter a decade previously, initially took his word at face value and accepted the help of who he believed was an established lawyer.

Furukawa unsuspectingly invited "Kawamura" into his home and introduced him to his family, including his younger daughter Ruriko, aged 10. However, upon meeting him, Ruriko immediately ran out of the house and to a nearby community bulletin board, upon which was placed a wanted poster for murderer Akira Nishiguchi. Ruriko had previously taken note of the poster since Nishiguchi's name was very close to that of a classmate, deviating only by one character, and thereby had inadvertently memorized the fugitive's mugshot. She also noted that the visitor was of a height matching the description on the wanted poster and bore two distinct moles seen in the mugshot.

Ruriko returned home to warn her parents, but was initially met with anger over what they perceived to be her disrespect towards their houseguest. When Furukawa insisted that the lawyer was a "messenger of happiness" over his promises to aid Menda's release campaign, Ruriko replied, "No, he is a messenger of evil!" Ruriko's apparent earnestness in her accusations compelled her parents to reconsider her claims.

Studying his new acquaintance more closely, Furukawa quickly saw that Nishiguchi seemed to only have a rudimentary knowledge of the law despite claiming to be an established lawyer. Taking his daughter's cue, he also took note of the moles on Nishiguchi's face. Furukawa excused himself and left the house, walking to the same community bulletin board Ruriko had visited the day before. He viewed the wanted poster and was stunned to realise that his daughter was right: "Kawamura" and Akira Nishiguchi were the same man.

Keeping his composure, Furukawa returned home and discreetly confirmed Ruriko's suspicions to the family. Not wanting Nishiguchi to escape, but also not wanting the fugitive to attack his family if they raised the alarm too early, Furukawa stalled for time by offering Nishiguchi a room for the night, which Nishiguchi readily accepted. After instructing his wife to distract Nishiguchi with conversation, Furukawa installed a lock on a section of the house where the family could be sequestered until Nishiguchi went to sleep.

Shortly after 11.00pm, the light in Nishiguchi's room had gone out. Once he was certain that Nishiguchi was asleep, Furukawa dispatched his wife and eldest daughter to the police station; Furukawa stayed in the house to protect Ruriko. They successfully did so, but as the local police did not anticipate Nishiguchi coming to such a small, remote city, they were informed that the force needed several hours to gather enough officers to apprehend the fugitive. The two women returned to the house in order to avoid arousing Nishiguchi's suspicions.

By 4.00am on 3 January, the Furukawa household had been quietly surrounded by hidden policemen. Nishiguchi woke up early and greeted the family, but immediately realized something was wrong. He quickly gathered his possessions and told them that he had to travel to Fukuoka immediately. As soon as he attempted to leave the house, Nishiguchi was ambushed by police. He offered no resistance as he was loaded into a waiting police vehicle and driven away.

== Trial and imprisonment ==
Under police questioning, Nishiguchi proved forthright and confessed to all of the charges brought against him. He also admitted that he had fully intended to kill Furukawa and his family once he had secured the money intended for Menda's release campaign. "Fraud is troublesome", he told authorities. "It is easier to kill."

At his trial before the Fukuoka District Court, which lasted almost a year, he was ultimately convicted on all charges, and was sentenced to death on 23 December 1964. An appeal by Nishiguchi's defense, arguing that he was mentally unwell when he committed his crimes, was unsuccessful.

While incarcerated, Nishiguchi was frequently visited by Furukawa, who read religious literature to him; while Nishiguchi was resistant at first, he slowly opened up to Furukawa and had found common ground with him by the time of his execution. Nishiguchi also wrote letters to his children, urging them to live as law-abiding citizens and not follow his path into criminality. He also often held visits with his eldest son, and reportedly wept in his son's presence on each occasion.

== Death ==
Akira Nishiguchi was executed by hanging at Fukuoka Detention House on 11 December 1970, at age 44. In a twist of fate, his preparations for execution were witnessed by Sakae Menda, the death row prisoner whose release Furukawa was working to secure when Nishiguchi came to his home in 1964. (Note: Menda would later be exonerated following a retrial in 1983, after being imprisoned for thirty-four years.) His final words were: "Please cast my ashes in Beppu Bay. Amen."

== Aftermath ==
Tairyu Furukawa and his family were publicly commended for their role in Nishiguchi's capture and were awarded in a televised ceremony. Upon hearing that Nishiguchi's wife and children had been shunned by their community, Furukawa volunteered to pay the tuition fees for his children; Ruriko also became friends with Nishiguchi's eldest son. Elsewhere Nishiguchi's parents, ashamed by their son's actions and made social outcasts during his highly publicised crime spree, were forced to close their fishing business.

As a consequence of Nishiguchi's activities, the organizational structure of Japan's National Police Agency was broadened to allow for greater coordination between prefectural forces.

== Cultural impact ==
The Nishiguchi case became the basis for Ryūzō Saki's novel Vengeance is Mine (1975), which won the author a Naoki Prize. The book was subsequently adapted into a film of the same name in 1979, directed by Shōhei Imamura. While based on Nishiguchi's story, the film changes the name of the killer (played by Ken Ogata) to "Iwao Enokizu" and depicts the murders out of sequence. The film won the Best Picture Award at the 1979 Japanese Academy Awards, and was awarded Best Screenplay (for Masaru Baba) and Best Actor (for Ken Ogata) at the Yokohama Film Festival.

== See also ==
- List of serial killers by country
