= It All Began When I Met You =

- Theatrical release poster
- Directed by: Katsuhide Motoki
- Written by: Atsuko Hashibe
- Produced by: Kentaro Koike; Shinzo Matsuhashi
- Starring: Hiroshi Tamaki; Rin Takanashi; Fumino Kimura; Masahiro Higashide; Tsubasa Honda; Miwako Ichikawa; Saburō Tokitō; Nene Otsuka; Nenji Kobayashi; Chieko Baisho
- Music by: Yoshihiro Ike
- Production companies: Warner Bros. Pictures Japan; East Japan Marketing & Communications Inc.; Shirogumi; The Asahi Shimbun; GyaO; Tokyo FM
- Distributed by: Warner Bros. Pictures Japan
- Release date: 22 November 2013 (Japan)
- Running time: 106 minutes
- Country: Japan
- Language: Japanese

It All Began When I Met You (Japanese: すべては君に逢えたから, Hepburn: Subete wa Kimi ni Aeta kara) is a 2013 Japanese film directed by Katsuhide Motoki, and released by Warner Bros. in Japan on 22 November 2013. Inspired by the 2003 British romantic comedy Love Actually, the film is made up of six separate stories revolving around ten people at Tokyo Station just before Christmas. It was produced to commemorate the 100th anniversary of Tokyo Station, and was filmed with full cooperation by the railway company JR East.

== Stories ==
1. Eve no Koibito (イヴの恋人; Christmas Eve Lover)
2. Enkyori Renai (遠距離恋愛; Long-distance Love Affair)
3. Christmas no Yūki (クリスマスの勇気; Christmas Courage)
4. Christmas Present (クリスマスプレゼント)
5. Nibun no Ichi Seijinshiki (二分の一成人式; Half a Coming-of-age Ceremony)
6. Okurete Kita Present (遅れてきたプレゼント; Belated Present)

== Cast ==
=== Story 1: Eve no Koibito ===
- Hiroshi Tamaki as Kazuki Kuroyama, a company president
- Rin Takanashi as Reiko Sasaki, an aspiring actress

=== Story 2: Enkyori Renai ===
- Fumino Kimura as Yukina Yamaguchi, a fashion designer
- Masahiro Higashide as Takumi Tsumura, a construction worker

=== Story 3: Christmas no Yūki ===
- Tsubasa Honda as Natsumi Otomo, a cake shop employee

=== Story 4: Christmas Present ===
- Miwako Ichikawa as Chiharu Kishimoto, an orphanage worker
- Emiri Kai as Akane Terai

=== Story 5: Nibun no Ichi Seijinshiki ===
- Saburō Tokitō as Masayuki Miyazaki, a train driver
- Nene Otsuka as Saori Miyazaki, Masayuki's wife
- Ryutaro Yamasaki as Koji Miyazaki, their son

=== Story 6: Okurete Kita Present ===
- Chieko Baisho as Kotoko Oshima, a Tokyo Station pastry shop employee
- Nenji Kobayashi as Taizo Matsuura

== Special screenings ==
The film was screened at the 26th Tokyo International Film Festival on 23 October 2013.
