= Sada (film) =

1998 film

- Japanese film poster for Sada
- Directed by: Nobuhiko Obayashi
- Written by: Yūko Nishizawa
- Produced by: Kyōko Ōbayashi
- Starring: Hitomi Kuroki; Tsurutarō Kataoka; Norihei Miki
- Cinematography: Noritaka Sakamoto
- Edited by: Nobuhiko Obayashi
- Music by: Nobuhiko Obayashi (as Sōtarō Gaku)
- Distributed by: Shochiku
- Release date: 11 April 1998 (Japan)
- Running time: 132 minutes
- Country: Japan
- Language: Japanese

Sada (Japanese: SADA〜戯作・阿部定の生涯, Hepburn: Sada: Gesaku · Abe Sada no shōgai) is a 1998 Japanese drama film directed by Nobuhiko Obayashi and based on the true story of Sada Abe. It was entered into the 48th Berlin International Film Festival.

== Cast ==
- Hitomi Kuroki as Sada Abe
- Tsurutarō Kataoka as Tatsuzo Kikumoto
- Norihei Miki as Takuzo Abe
- Kippei Shiina as Masaru Okada
- Toshie Negishi as Yoshi Kikumoto
- Bengaru as Sanosuke Tachibana
- Renji Ishibashi as Shinkichi
- Kyūsaku Shimada as Takiguchi
- Jirō Sakagami as Miyazaki
