= Emotion (film) =

1966 Japanese short film

- The Criterion Collection release cover art

Japanese name
- Kanji: EMOTION 伝説の午後 いつか見たドラキュラ
Transcriptions
- Revised Hepburn: Emotion: densetsu no gogo = itsukamita Dracula
- Directed by: Nobuhiko Obayashi
- Written by: Kyoko Hanyu; Nobuhiko Obayashi
- Produced by: Kyoko Obayashi
- Starring: Emi Tabata; Sari Akasaka
- Narrated by: Kyoko Hanyu (Japanese); Donald Richie (English)
- Cinematography: Nobuhiko Obayashi
- Edited by: Nobuhiko Obayashi
- Music by: Naoshi Miyazaki
- Release date: 1966
- Running time: 39 minutes
- Country: Japan
- Languages: English; Japanese

Emotion (Japanese: EMOTION 伝説の午後 いつか見たドラキュラ, Hepburn: Emotion: Densetsu no gogo・Itsuka mita Dorakyura), stylized on-screen as Émotion, is a 1966 Japanese experimental short film directed by Nobuhiko Obayashi. It stars Emi Tabata as Emi, a young woman who travels from a seaside village to a city, where she meets another girl named Sari (Sari Akasaka) and encounters a vampire.

== Cast ==
- Emi Tabata as Emi
- Sari Akasaka as Sari
- Jinichi Isizaki
- Keiko Machida
- Jusin Kitamura
- Harumi Sō
- Ichirō Takahasi
- Tamiko Tachikawa
- Misuzu Mori
- Yoshiyuki Oka
- Sakio Hirata
- Chigumi Obayashi

== Reception ==
In 2015, David Cairns of Notebook referred to Emotion as "a collage of camera effects, stills, pixillation and every other trick the decade had to offer", concluding: "Obayashi's caffeinated take on avant-garde cinema certainly shows the influence of commercials, and he never met a gimmick he didn't like, but he can sure compose a shot."

== Home media ==
On 26 October 2010, the Criterion Collection released Obayashi's 1977 feature-length film House on Blu-ray and DVD, with Emotion included as a special feature.
