= Yasuko Tomita =

Japanese actress (born 1969)

- Born: February 27, 1969 (age 57); Shime, Kasuya, Fukuoka, Japan
- Occupation: Actress
- Years active: 1983–present
- Agent: Amuse, Inc.

Yasuko Tomita (富田靖子, Tomita Yasuko; born 27 February 1969 in Fukuoka, Japan) is a Japanese former idol, singer and actress. She won the Award for Best Newcomer at the 6th Yokohama Film Festival and at the 8th Japan Academy Prize for Aiko 16 sai. She also worked with director Nobuhiko Obayashi in the acclaimed fantasy comedy-drama Sabishinbo in 1985 and the melodrama based on Kazue Oyama's manga Four Sisters on the same year. She won the award for best actress at the 9th Yokohama Film Festival for Bu Su. In 1995, she enjoyed career breakthrough as she won the Best Actress award at 1995 Tokyo International Film Festival for The Christ Of Nanjing.

== Filmography ==
=== Film ===
- Aiko 16 sai (1983)
- Lonely Heart (1985)
- Four Sisters (1985)
- Bu Su (1987)
- The Christ Of Nanjing (1995)
- Kitchen (1997)
- My Neighbors the Yamadas (1999)
- Love Tomato (2006)
- Kimi ni Todoke (2010)
- This Country's Sky (2015)
- Being Good (2015)
- The Cross (2016), Shunsuke's mother
- Tomoshibi (2017)
- My Friend "A" (2018), Yayoi Shiraishi
- Aiuta: My Promise To Nakuhito (2019)
- Mentai Piriri (2019), Chiyoko Umino
- Fukushima 50 (2020), Tomoko Isaki
- The Mukoda Barber Shop (2022)
- The Lines That Define Me (2022), Suizan Tōdō
- Mentai Piriri: Flower of Pansy (2023), Chiyoko Umino
- Sisam (2024)
- Who Cares?: The Movie (2025), Mika Okita
- Purehearted (2025), Sayoko Iba
- One Liter of Tears (2027), Shioka Ikeuchi

=== Television ===
- Mōri Motonari (1997), Lady Myōkyū
- Gō (2011), Lady Kasuga
- Here Comes Asa! (2015), Kazu
- Hitoshi Ueki and Nobosemon (2017)
- Scarlet (2019–20)
- Fixer (2023), Sayuri Nitta
- Who Cares? (2024), Mika Okita
- Chihayafuru: Full Circle (2025), Izumi Nakanishi
- Straight to Hell (2026)
