= If You Were Young: Rage =

- Theatrical release poster
- Directed by: Kinji Fukasaku
- Screenplay by: Takehiro Nakajima; Koji Matsumoto; Kinji Fukasaku
- Produced by: Seishi Matsumaru; Norio Sunoda; Saburo Muto
- Starring: Tetsuo Ishidate; Gin Maeda
- Cinematography: Takamoto Ezure
- Edited by: Keiichi Uraoka
- Music by: Taku Izumi
- Production companies: Shinsei Eigasha; Bungakuza
- Distributed by: Shochiku
- Release date: May 27, 1970
- Running time: 89 minutes
- Country: Japan
- Language: Japanese

If You Were Young: Rage (Japanese: 君が若者なら, Hepburn: Kimi ga Wakamono Nara), also known as Our Dear Buddies, is a 1970 Japanese film financed, produced, directed and co-written by Kinji Fukasaku. The film stars Tetsuo Ishidate and Gin Maeda as a pair of Tokyo day laborers who along with three other friends pool their money together to buy a dump truck, which they dub "Independence No. 1". The film was, for a time, thought to be lost.

== Plot ==
After working in a factories for low pay for years, Asao and his long-time friend Kikuo Higuchi buy their own dump truck and call it "Independence No. 1". They pay monthly installments on it from their profits working for a transportation company. While enjoying their newfound happiness, they think back on their old friends Kiyoshi Yabe, a fisherman's son, Ichiro, a factory worker's son, and Ryuji, the son of pioneer farmers.

Years earlier, following the closing of the factory, the five are living together in the men's dorm until it and the factory are auctioned off and they are kicked out. That night Ryuji has his debut boxing match and his friends get arrested for fighting with hecklers. Ryuji fights with the police in order to be placed in the cell with his friends for the night, where they hatch the plan to pool their money for the next year to buy their own dump truck. When released, they dedicate themselves to their respective jobs and save their paychecks.

In the present, Kiyoshi's mother and sister visit him in prison after he falls behind on his payments for the truck and gets caught by the police trying to steal merchandise from a warehouse. Asao recalls when he was robbed of his earnings and Kiyoshi prevented him from taking a knife and killing the muggers in revenge. Ichiro has gotten a girl pregnant multiple times and must borrow money from Asao and Kikuo after already having taken back the money he was supposed to contribute to the truck. Ryuji was beaten to death by police for interfering with their assault on striking workers. His sister tells Asao and Kikuo that they should keep his money for the truck and gives them a rear-view mirror decoration of a pair of boxing gloves Ryuji had bought for them.

After ten days of rain, Asao and Kikuo are desperate for work to make their installment payment so they accept a gravel transportation job from their boss, angering the striking workers at their company. After Asao scraps the truck against a rock wall, the two men get into a fight. Asao apologizes, then goes out drinking at Ryuji's sister's bar and sleeps with her. The striking workers spray paint the friends' truck as "Strikebreaker No. 1" so they are forced to clean it off.

Kiyoshi escapes from prison and hides out with Asao to recover from a gunshot wound from a cop he killed during the escape. When Yukiko finds him, he pulls a knife and demands the keys to the truck from Asao, then drops it when Asao says that Kiyoshi must kill him first. Kiyoshi admits the reason he never became a fisherman was because of his fear of the sea and says that he might be able to start over if he sees it. Kikuo threatens to tell the police but Asao punches him and takes Kiyoshi away in the truck, driving into Kikuo on the way. Asao drives through the night but Kiyoshi dies just as they reach the sea. Asao drives off a cliff toward the sea but they crash on the beach below and Kiyoshi is burned in the wreckage while Asao climbs out. Asao is arrested and ends up in prison. Kikuo and Yukiko meet at the wreckage site, where Kikuo finds the boxing gloves decoration and decides to start his life over as well.

== Cast ==
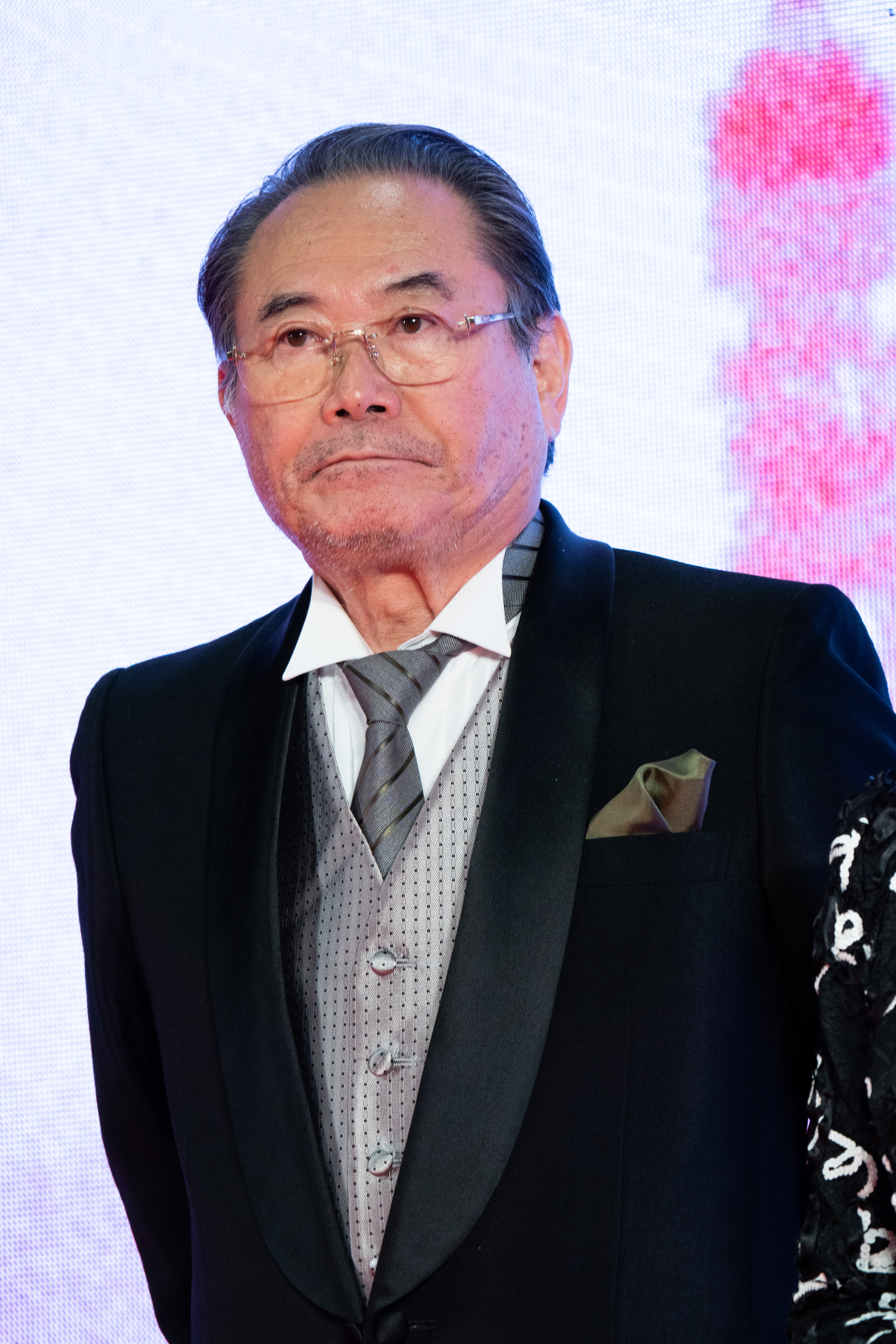
Gin Maeda (pictured in 2019) stars as Asao

- Tetsuo Ishidate as Kikuo Higuchi
- Gin Maeda as Asao
- Choichiro Kawarasaki as Kiyoshi Yabe
- Hideki Hayashi as Ichiro
- Ryunosuke Minegishi as Ryuji
- Michie Terada as Yukiko, Kiyoshi's sister
- Mayumi Ogawa as Ryuji's sister
- Michiko Araki as Kiyoshi's mother
- Hisako Yabuki as Asao's mother
- Kiwako Taichi as Ichiro's girlfriend
- Yumiko Fujita as a bank teller
- Sanae Nakahara
- Jitsuko Yoshimura
- Hideo Murota as a heckler

== Production ==
Having been under contract to Toei since the late 1950s, 1970's If You Were Young: Rage was Kinji Fukasaku's first independent film. According to Tom Mes, the director wanted to express his views on "the social ills of post-war Japan" and knew Toei and other major studios would not give him that opportunity. So he teamed up with the small production company Shinsei Eigasha for If You Were Young: Rage, as well as 1972's Under the Flag of the Rising Sun. Fukasaku said that Shinsei Eigasha was always looking to make films that would inspire and encourage young people by focusing on the potential they had. He explained that If You Were Young: Rage came from the idea of making a film version of the popular television drama Wakamono Tachi ("Live Your Own Way"). The director said this happened to fit well with an idea he had for a new kind of film that showed the criminal tendencies in some young people, and the production company agreed. The producers wanted the film to have a positive outlook on the future, but Fukasaku stated that the real world was "too bleak to make that kind of movie". He described If You Were Young: Rage as showing the characters vainly struggling in various ways to escape that bleak world, "the condemned fate of mass employment". He said one of the film's themes is how the friends try to regain trust in each other.

== Release ==
If You Were Young: Rage had not been seen by audiences following its brief theatrical run in 1970. The film was even thought to have been lost, until it was recovered from the Shochiku vault in the late 1990s. A new print was made and shown as part of Fukasaku retrospectives at the 2000 Rotterdam Film Festival and the American Cinematheque. Home Vision Entertainment released the film on DVD in North America on January 6, 2004.

== Reception ==
Mes described If You Were Young: Rage as one of Fukasaku's "most uncompromising films" for directly laying bare the numerous negative side effects of Japan's economic miracle. He also wrote that it was the director's first film to show themes that would become central to his later works, such as the Battles Without Honor and Humanity series and Graveyard of Honor. Dennis Lim of The Village Voice praised If You Were Young: Rage as one of Fukasaku's best and least typical films. He too wrote that it tackles one of the director's perennial themes: "the despair and disillusionment of those left behind by warp-speed post-war transformations". Lim also noted that Fukasaku's "jostling, handheld Scope photography with copious freeze-frames, immoderate zooms, and scrambled film stocks" effectively captures the "toxic fury and frustrations of a thwarted young adulthood".
