= The Miracle of Joe Petrel =

- Film poster
- Directed by: Toshiya Fujita
- Screenplay by: Toshiya Fujita; Eiichi Uchida; Fumio Kōnami
- Produced by: Toshio Nabeshima
- Starring: Saburō Tokitō; Miwako Fujitani; Kunie Tanaka; Kentarō Shimizu; Yoshio Harada
- Cinematography: Tatsuo Suzuki
- Edited by: Osamu Inoue
- Music by: Ryudo Uzaki
- Production company: Shochiku
- Distributed by: Shochiku
- Release date: April 28, 1984 (Japan)
- Running time: 133 minutes
- Country: Japan
- Language: Japanese

The Miracle of Joe Petrel (Japanese: 海燕ジョーの奇跡, Hepburn: Umitsubame Jō no kiseki), also known as The Miracle of Umitsubame Joe, The Miracle of Joe, the Petrel and The Stormy Petrel, is a 1984 Japanese film co-written and directed by Toshiya Fujita. It is based on the novel of the same name by Ryūzō Saki, originally published in 1980. Saki's novel was inspired by the actions of the Kyokuryū-kai yakuza clan during the "Fourth Okinawan War."

== Synopsis ==
Joe Petrel is a half-Filipino, half-Okinawan gangster who escapes to the Philippines after killing a mob boss. The film chronicles his misadventures with underworld characters, the police and a saloon girl named Yōko.

== Cast ==
- Saburō Tokitō as Umitsubame Joe
- Miwako Fujitani as Yōko Tamaki
- Kunie Tanaka as Dosegashira
- Kentarō Shimizu as Sawai
- Yoshio Harada as Yonamine
- Toshiro Mifune as the Fisherman

== Awards ==
9th Hochi Film Award

- Best Actor - Saburō Tokitō
