= Akai Tsuki =

- Film poster
- Directed by: Yasuo Furuhata
- Screenplay by: Yasuo Furuhata; Yumiko Inoue
- Based on: Akai Tsuki by Rei Nakanishi
- Produced by: Kensaku Wada; Takahide Morichi
- Starring: Takako Tokiwa; Yusuke Iseya; Teruyuki Kagawa
- Cinematography: Daisaku Kimura
- Edited by: Akimasa Kawashima
- Music by: Tomoyuki Asakawa
- Production companies: Nippon Television; Dentsu; Yomiuri Telecasting Corporation; Yomiuri Shimbun Company; Nippan Group Holdings; Stardust Pictures
- Distributed by: Toho
- Release date: February 7, 2004
- Running time: 111 minutes
- Country: Japan
- Language: Japanese
- Box office: ¥910 million

Akai Tsuki (Japanese: 赤い月; transl. Red Moon) is a 2004 Japanese historical drama film directed by Yasuo Furuhata. It is set in Manchukuo during World War II.

== Cast ==
- Takako Tokiwa as Namiko Morita
- Yusuke Iseya as Keisuke Himuro
- Teruyuki Kagawa as Yutaro Morita
- Tomoyasu Hotei as Kanji Osugi
- Takayuki Sorita as Kazuo Morita
- Chiaki Saito as Misaki Morita
- Yuki Sato as Kohei Morita
- Ren Osugi as Zou Linxiang
- Taro Yamamoto as Shoichi Makita
- Elena Zakharova as Elena Ivanova
- Valery Dolzhenkov as Pyotr Ivanov
- Ippei Kanie as Lieutenant Tamura
- Satoshi Yamanaka as Mamoru Muranaka

== Accolades ==
28th Japan Academy Prize

- Nominated: Best Actress - Takako Tokiwa
- Nominated: Best Supporting Actor - Teruyuki Kagawa
