= Misako Konno =

Japanese actress and essayist

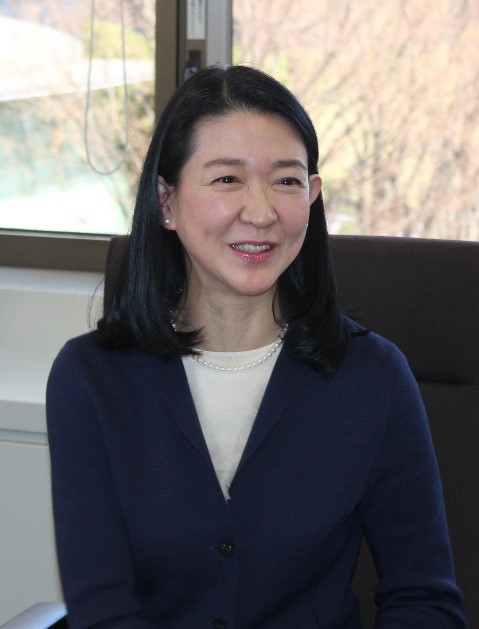
- Born: September 8, 1960 (age 65); Tokyo, Japan
- Occupations: Actress, essayist
- Years active: 1976–present
- Spouse: Shinji Shinoda (m. 1992)

Misako Konno (紺野 美沙子 Konno Misako), born Misako Shinoda (篠田 美佐子 Shinoda Misako, born September 8, 1960) is a Japanese actress and essayist.

Her maiden name is Misako Satō (佐藤美佐子 Satō Misako).

In 2022, she became the third woman appointed in an organization linked to the Japan Sumo Association, by being appointed to the Yokozuna Deliberation Council.

== Filmography ==
=== Film ===
Year	Title	Role	Notes	Ref.
1983	Aiko 16 sai	Aiko Shimazaki		
1983	The Go Masters			
1985	Four Sisters	Aya Kitazawa	Lead role	
1995	Junkers Come Here	Suzuko Nozawa (voice)		
1997	Rebirth of Mothra II	Toshiko		
2003	Like Asura	Tsuchiya		

=== Television ===
Year	Title	Role	Notes	Ref.
1976	Space Ironman Kyodain	A Schoolgirl	Episode 29	
1980	Niji o oru	Kayo Shimazaki	Lead role; Asadora	
1983	Tokugawa Ieyasu	Kinomi	Taiga drama	
1985–1986	Sanada Taiheiki	Komatsuhime		
1988	Takeda Shingen	Lady Sanjō	Taiga drama	
1993	Homura Tatsu	Kichiji	Taiga drama	
1998	Gokenin Zankurō	Oshima		
1999–2000	Asuka	Kyōko Miyamoto (Asuka's mother)	Asadora	

== Awards and nominations ==
Year	Award	Category	Work	Result	Ref.
1983	7th Elan d'or Awards	Newcomer of the Year	Herself	Won	
1987	10th Japan Academy Prize	Best Supporting Actress	Four Sisters	Nominated	
