= Aiko 16 sai =

- Film poster
- Directed by: Akiyoshi Imazeki
- Screenplay by: Akiyoshi Imazeki; Mitsuhiko Akita; Chiho Katsura; Makoto Naitô
- Based on: 1980 Aiko 16 sai by Akemi Hotta
- Produced by: Yokichi Osato; Tatsuo Ogawa
- Starring: Yasuko Tomita; Yumiko Fujita; Hiroshi Inuzuka; Yuki Matsushita; Misako Konno
- Cinematography: Hideo Hara
- Edited by: Nobutake Kamiya
- Music by: Keisuke Kuwata; Southern All Stars
- Production companies: Amuse City Cinema; Chubu-Nippon Broadcasting
- Distributed by: Kadokawa Herald
- Release date: December 17, 1983 (Japan)
- Running time: 98 minutes
- Country: Japan
- Language: Japanese

Aiko 16 sai (Japanese: アイコ十六歳, Hepburn: Aiko jûroku-sai) is a 1983 Japanese teen drama film co-written and directed by Akiyoshi Imazeki. It is based on the novel 1980 Aiko 16 sai by Akemi Hotta. Nobuhiko Obayashi is credited as an executive producer on the film. The film's score was composed by Keisuke Kuwata and his band Southern All Stars.

== Premise ==
A story depicting the life of Aiko Mita (Yasuko Tomita), a girl living in Nagoya who is part of her school's archery club. On her way home from the first semester closing ceremony, Aiko sees a guy she once dated in middle school. She hasn't been in contact with him since graduating from middle school, but decides to re-establish ties. Later, during second semester, an experienced archery champion named Aiko Shimazaki (Misako Konno) joins the team. While everyone aspires to be more like Shimazaki, it is soon discovered that she had once been pregnant and was suicidal. Aiko befriends Shimazaki while training to become an archery champion herself.

== Cast ==
- Yasuko Tomita as Aiko Mita
- Yumiko Fujita as Yoshiko Mita
- Hiroshi Inuzuka as Shiro Mita
- Yuki Matsushita as Reiko
- Misako Konno as Aiko Shimazaki
- Misa Kawai as Beniko Hanaoka
- Yumi Asano as Motoko
- Sakae Igami as Shihono
- Shiro Kishibe as Yutaka Hashimoto
- Akiko Kitamura as Ikuyo Yano
- Yukio Miyagi as Uncle
- Reiko Miyoshi as Kyoko Okamoto
- Yûji Mori as Fukuhara
- Kiyoshi Namikata as Jiro Moriwaki
- Tatsuya Oka as Ryota Kawano
- Toru Sakai as Aitsu
- Kumi Shigemitsu as Nurse
- Tsurube Shofukutei as Police
- Hanae Shôji as Auntie

== Production ==
Both Yasuko Tomita and Yuki Matsushita made their acting debuts in this film.

== Awards ==
For her performance in the film, Yasuko Tomita won the Award for Best Newcomer at the 6th Yokohama Film Festival and at the 8th Japan Academy Awards.
