= Yuki Matsushita (actress) =

Japanese actress (born 1968)

- 松下 由樹
- Born: Yukie Matsushita; July 9, 1968 (age 58); Nayoro, Hokkaido, Japan
- Education: Nagoya Municipal Honjo Junior High School; Komazawa Gakuen Girl's High School
- Occupation: Actress
- Years active: 1983–present
- Agents: Amuse, Inc.; Jesus Collect Incorporated
- Known for: Aiko 16 sai; Nurse no Oshigoto; Ōoku; Otorisōsa-kan Shiho Katami; Around 40: Chūmon no Ōi Onna-tachi; Rinjō; Cocorico Miracle Type
- Awards: 15th Japan Academy Prize Best Supporting Actress Award

Yuki Matsushita (松下 由樹, Matsushita Yuki; born 9 July 1968) is a Japanese actress. Her real name is Yukie Matsushita (松下 幸枝, Matsushita Yukie).

Matsushita was born in Nayoro, Hokkaido and grew up in Nagoya, Aichi Prefecture. She is represented by Amuse, Inc. and later her personal office Jesus Collect Incorporated.

== Filmography ==
=== Films ===
Year	Title	Role	Notes	Ref.
1983	Aiko 16 sai	Reiko Suzuki		
2021	End-of-Life Concierge	Azusa Momoi		
2022	Cherry Magic! the Movie			
2023	Hold Your Hand			
2023	Red Shoes			
2024	The Ohara Family Rhapsody	Azusa Momoi		
2025	Who Cares?: The Movie	Mihoko Igarashi		
2026	Goodbye, My Loved Ones!	Azusa Momoi		

=== Television ===
Year	Title	Role	Notes	Ref.
1996–2002	I Am a Nurse	Shoko Sawada (née Ozaki)	4 seasons	
2015	Emergency Interrogation Room	Kiyomi Yajima	Television film	
2016	Our House	Kotone Akao		
2016	The Fate of a Public Prosecutor	Masao Shoji		
2016–2021	Keishichō Zero Gakari: Seikatsu Anzen-ka Nan Demo Sōdan-shitsu	Torazo Terada	4 seasons	
2022	Invisible	Masayo Onuki	Episode 4	
2024	Who Cares?	Mihoko Igarashi		

=== Stage ===
Year	Title	Role	Notes	Ref.
2016	Himitsu no Nakai to Kusemono-tachi			
