= Shunichi Kajima =

Japanese film director

- Born: January 2, 1944 (age 81); Ibaraki, Japan
- Occupation: Film director

Shunichi Kajima (梶間俊一, Kajima Shun'ichi) is a Japanese film director. After working for a publishing company, he joined Toei in 1970. He studied under Shunya Itō, Kinji Fukasaku, and Junya Sato, and was also involved in labor union activities. In 1983, he made his directorial debut with Praying Mantis.

Kajima won the award for Best Director at the 9th Yokohama Film Festival for Chōchin.

== Filmography ==
- The Return of the Sister Street Fighter, also known as Kaettekita onna hissatsu ken (帰って来た女必殺拳) (1975) (assistant director)
- Praying Mantis, also known as Akujo kamakiri (悪女かまきり) (1983)
- Chōchin, also known as Paper Lantern (ちょうちん) (1987)
- Kizu, also known as Scar or Scarface (疵) (1988)
- Firefly, also known as Hotaru or Ver Luisant (螢) (1989)
- Fûsen, also known as Balloon (1990) (screenplay only)
- Ryakudatsu ai, also known as Stealing Love or The Plunderer (略奪愛) (1991)
- The Anthropology of a Fight Scene, also known as Shuraba no ningengaku or Humanity in the Battlefield (修羅場の人間学) (1993)
- Lifetime Insecurity, also known as Shudan-sasen or Everyone's Demoted (集団左遷) (1994)
- Firefly 2: Red Scar (螢II 赤い傷痕) (1995)
- Kizu: Blood Apocalypse, also known as Scar: Blood Apocalypse (疵（きず） 血の黙示録) (1998)
- Kizu: Blood Apocalypse 2, also known as Scar: Blood Apocalypse 2 (疵（きず） 血の黙示録2) (1998)
- Kizu: Blood Apocalypse 3, also known as Scar: Blood Apocalypse 3 (疵（きず） 血の黙示録3) (1998)
- Kizu: Blood Apocalypse 4, also known as Scar: Blood Apocalypse 4 (疵（きず） 血の黙示録4) (1998)
- Kunoichi Financial Road (九ノ一金融道) (1999)
- Osamu's Morning (オサムの朝) (1999)
- Kizu: Blood Apocalypse 5, also known as Scar: Blood Apocalypse 5 (疵（きず）5 血の黙示録) (2000)
- Lone Wolf and Cub (TV series) (2002)
- True Record of an Ando Gang Side-Story: Starving Wolf's Rules, also known as Jitsuroku Andô-gumi gaiden: Garô no okite (2002)
- Odd Detective 1 (TV movie) (2003)
- Playgirl, also known as Pureigâru (プレイガール 映画) (2003) – Feature film remake of the TV series of the same name
- Shibuya Story, also known as Shibuya monogatari (渋谷物語) (2005)
- Shinbun Kisha Tsurumaki Goro 1, also known as The Journalist Goro Tsurumaki 1 (TV miniseries, 4 episodes) (2006)
- Lay Judges: Chosen and Discovered (2007) – Documentary about the lay judge system in Japan
- Danzetsu (TV movie) (2009)
- Tokudane maruhi kisha! Kamon Kohei no Satsujin Shuzai (TV movie) (2009)
- Okashina Keiji 8 (TV movie) (2011)
- Okashina Keiji 9 (TV movie) (2012)
- Senjô Parser Himuro Natsuko: Gôka ferry satsujin jiken (TV movie) (2012)
- Okashina Keiji 10 (TV movie) (2013)
- Odd Detective 14 (TV movie) (おかしな刑事14) (2016)
- Odd Detective 15 (TV movie) (おかしな刑事15) (2017)
- Muhyo to Rouji no Mahouritsu Soudan Jimusho (anime TV series, 1 episode) (2018)
