= Toshie Negishi =

Japanese film and television actress (born 1954)

- Born: February 3, 1954 (age 72); Tokyo, Japan
- Occupation: Actress
- Years active: 1974–present
- Agent: Alpha Agency
- Spouse(s): Akira Ōtsu (1981–1997); Keisuke Uga (2008–present)

Toshie Negishi (根岸 季衣; born 3 February 1954) is a Japanese film and television actress.

== Filmography ==
=== Film ===
- Kaerazaru hibi (1978)
- Toki o Kakeru Shōjo (1983), Tachibana
- Lonely Heart (1985), Makoto's mother
- The Sea and Poison (1986), Ueda
- Sada (1998), Yoshi Kikumoto
- Audition (1999), Rie
- Monday (2000), Miyoko Kondō
- Inochi (2002), Dr. Sugihara
- Get Up! (2003), Kazuko Satō
- Heaven's Bookstore (2004), Ōta
- Fine, Totally Fine (2008)
- Love Vibes (2010), Keiko Sakata
- When Marnie Was There (2014), Setsu Ōiwa (voice)
- Her Granddaughter (2014), Kyoko
- 100 Yen Love (2014), Toshiko Ikeuchi
- A Sower of Seeds 2 (2015)
- The Third Murder (2017)
- The Lowlife (2017)
- Enokida Trading Post (2018)
- The Promised Land (2019)
- Shadowfall (2019)
- The Woman Who Keeps A Murderer (2019), Yukari Sakuragi
- Family of Strangers (2019)
- Rise of the Machine Girls (2019)
- His (2020), Fusae Yoshimura
- Labyrinth of Cinema (2020)
- Midnight Swan (2020)
- The Mukoda Barber Shop (2022), Akemi Ōguro
- No Place to Go (2022), homeless
- Break in the Clouds (2022)
- Call Me Chihiro (2023), Nagai
- Home Sweet Home (2023)
- Family (2023)
- The Women in the Lakes (2024)
- The Floor Plan (2024), Fumino Katabuchi
- House of Sayuri (2024), Harue Kamiki
- Kaneko's Commissary (2025), Kozue Kojima
- River Returns (2025)
- Kill Your Tears, Okiharu (2026)
- Monster in Sheep's Clothing (2026), Kiyoko Kusakabe

=== Television ===
- Monkey (1980), Mistress Miaow Miaow
- Seibu Keisatsu (1980), Kyōko Nagai
- G-Men '75 (1981), Tamiko Kishimoto
- Ōoka Echizen (1998), Osen
- Kumo no Kaidan (2005), Chikako Aaikawa
- The Queen's Classroom (2005), Sayuri Saigō
- The Reason I Can't Find My Love (2011), Yumiko Ogura
- Doctor Ume (2012), Masako Katō
- Idaten (2019), Ura Tabata
- Hirayasumi (2025), Hanae Wada
- Lunacy (2026), Runa's grandmother
- The Scent of the Wind (2026), Sada Okuda
