= Beijing Watermelon =

- Film poster
- Directed by: Nobuhiko Obayashi
- Screenplay by: Yoshihiro Ishimatsu
- Produced by: Kaneo Kawanabe; Michio Morioka; Kyōko Ōbayashi
- Starring: Bengal; Masako Motai; Tōru Minegishi; Takashi Sasano; Akira Emoto; Haruhiko Saitō
- Cinematography: Shigekazu Nagano
- Edited by: Nobuhiko Obayashi
- Music by: Tetsuo Kondō
- Distributed by: Shochiku
- Release date: November 18, 1989 (Japan)
- Running time: 135 minutes
- Country: Japan
- Languages: Japanese; Chinese

Beijing Watermelon (Japanese: 北京的西瓜, Hepburn: Pekin no Suika) is a 1989 Japanese slice of life film directed by Nobuhiko Obayashi. Based partly on true events, the film follows the relationship between a Japanese greengrocer and a group of Chinese exchange students. The film is noted for the proximity of its production and release to the Tiananmen Square massacre, which forced the cancellation of plans to shoot the Beijing-set portions of the film on-location.

== Plot summary ==
In Funabashi, greengrocer Shunzo offers a discount on produce to a Chinese exchange student who cannot afford to purchase vegetables. The act begins a paternal-like relationship between Shunzo and a rotating group of Chinese exchange students living in the city, in which he supports them through actions such as giving them discounted or free groceries, helping them find housing, and transporting them to and from the airport.

Shunzo's generosity, which often comes at the expense of his ability to provide for his own actual family, is alternately supported by and a source of tension between Shunzo and his wife Michi. Years later, Shunzo and Michi are invited to Beijing by the now-graduated students, who throw a banquet in their honor. There, Michi delivers a speech in which she tearfully thanks the students for allowing her husband to become a more giving and empathetic person.

== Cast ==
- Bengal as Shunzo Horikoshi
- Masako Motai as Michi Horikoshi
- Tōru Minegishi as Dr. Muraki
- Takashi Sasano as Yamada
- Akira Emoto as Teramoto
- Haruhiko Saitō as Ioka

== Production and release ==
Beijing Watermelon is directed and edited by Nobuhiko Obayashi with a screenplay by Yoshihiro Ishimatsu. The plot is partly based on true events, and was produced after Obayashi and his crew met the real-life grocer and students that the film is based on while shooting another film. Filmed from May to June 1989, the Tiananmen Square massacre occurred mid-production, forcing the cancellation of plans to shoot the Beijing-set portions of the film on-location.

In 2021, a restoration of the film was undertaken by distributor Shochiku.

== Reception ==
Upon its original release, Kevin Thomas of The Los Angeles Times praised Beijing Watermelon as "an eloquent commentary on the magic of the cinema itself" that "bring[s] to mind the films of Frank Capra." In an essay about the restoration of the film for Metrograph, Matt Turner describes Beijing Watermelon as a film "about finding connections and commonalities despite differences of nationality, culture, and class" but where the "imaginative side of Obayashi is still much on display", comparing it to the works of Yasujirō Ozu and Robert Altman. The Gene Siskel Film Center similarly described the film as "Ôbayashi at his most modern, while his experimental flourishes invite viewers to fill in the blanks of history".
