= I Are You, You Am Me =

Tenkōsei
- Theatrical release poster

Japanese name
- Kanji: 転校生
- Literal meaning: Transfer student(s)
Transcriptions
- Revised Hepburn: Tenkōsei
- Directed by: Nobuhiko Obayashi
- Screenplay by: Wataru Kenmotsu
- Based on: Tenkōsei by Hisashi Yamanaka
- Produced by: Michio Morioka; Shosuke Taga; Kyōko Ōbayashi
- Starring: Toshinori Omi; Satomi Kobayashi; Makoto Satō; Kirin Kiki; Jō Shishido
- Cinematography: Yoshitaka Sakamoto
- Music by: Shōhei Hayashi
- Production companies: Art Theatre Guild; Nippon Television
- Distributed by: Shochiku
- Release date: April 17, 1982 (Japan)
- Running time: 112 minutes
- Country: Japan
- Language: Japanese

I Are You, You Am Me (Japanese: 転校生, Hepburn: Tenkōsei), also known as Exchange Students, is a 1982 Japanese fantasy film directed by Nobuhiko Obayashi. It is based on a novel of the same name by Hisashi Yamanaka. Obayashi himself directed and co-wrote a second film based on the same novel, premiered in 2007 and titled Switching: Goodbye Me (Japanese: 転校生－さよなら あなた－, Hepburn: Tenkōsei: Sayonara Anata).

== Plot ==
I Are You, You Am Me tells the story of two junior high school students, Kazuo and Kazumi, who accidentally fall down a flight of stairs and inexplicably switch bodies. As they navigate their new lives in each other's bodies, they experience the world from a different perspective, leading to humorous and poignant moments. The film explores themes of identity, adolescence, and empathy, providing a unique take on the body-swap genre.

Switching: Goodbye Me, the 2007 remake, retains the core plot of the original while updating the setting and characters for a new generation. It follows the same premise of two teenagers swapping bodies but incorporates modern elements and sensibilities. Both films are based on the novel by Hisashi Yamanaka and showcase Obayashi's distinctive directorial style, blending whimsical fantasy with heartfelt drama.

== Cast ==
- Toshinori Omi as Kazuo Saitō
- Satomi Kobayashi as Kazumi Saitō
- Makoto Satō as Akio Saitō (Father of Kazuo)
- Kirin Kiki as Naoko Saitō (Mother of Kazuo)
- Jō Shishido as Kouzou Saitō (Father of Kazumi)
- Wakaba Irie as Chie Saitō (Mother of Kazumi)
- Masuno Takahashi as Masuno Saitō (Grandma)
- Munenori Iwamoto as Masaaki Kaneko
- Daisuke Ohyama as Kenji Sakui
- Etsuko Shihomi as Mitsuko Ono

== Switching: Goodbye Me Cast ==
- Misako Renbutsu as Kazumi Saito
- Misa Shimizu as Naoko Saito
- Tomorowo Taguchi as Kozo Saito
- Joe Shishido as Yoshinojo Yoshida
- Hiroshi Inuzuka as Konosuke Saito
- Hiroyuki Nagato as Masao Imada

== Awards ==
4th Yokohama Film Festival

- Won: Best Film
- Won: Best Screenplay – Wataru Kenmochi
- Won: Best Newcomer – Satomi Kobayashi
