= Saburō Tokitō =

Japanese actor and singer (born 1958)

- 時任三郎
- Born: February 4, 1958 (age 68); Setagaya, Tokyo, Japan
- Occupations: Actor, Singer
- Years active: 1980–present

Saburō Tokitō (時任三郎, Tokitō Saburō) is a Japanese actor and singer. He won the award for best actor at the 9th Yokohama Film Festival for Eien no 1/2 and at the 9th Hochi Film Award for The Miracle of Joe Petrel.

== Filmography ==
=== Film ===
- The Gate of Youth (1981)
- The Miracle of Joe Petrel (1984)
- Chōchin (1987)
- A Better Tomorrow III (1989)
- Spy Games (1989)
- Eien no 1/2 (1987)
- Happy Flight (2008)
- It All Began When I Met You (2013)
- Good Morning Show (2016)
- Survival Family (2017)
- Kazoku no Hanashi (2018)
- Fortuna's Eye (2019)
- Dr. Coto's Clinic 2022 (2022), Taketoshi Hara

=== Television series ===
- Doberman Deka (1980)
- Homura Tatsu (1993–94), Benkei
- Dr. Coto's Clinic (2003–06), Taketoshi Hara
- Gō (2011), Azai Nagamasa
- Tokyo Control (2011)
- Overprotected Kahoko (2017)
- In Hand (2019), Kazunari Fukuyama
