= Tsurutaro Kataoka =

Japanese television personality and actor (born 1954)

- 片岡 鶴太郎
- Born: December 21, 1954 (age 71); Arakawa, Tokyo, Japan
- Occupations: Television personality, actor, artist
- Years active: 1973–present

Tsurutaro Kataoka (片岡 鶴太郎, Kataoka Tsurutarō; born December 21, 1954) is a Japanese television personality, actor, artist, and former professional boxer. For his role in the 1988 film The Discarnates, he won the award for best supporting actor at the 31st Blue Ribbon Awards, at the 13th Hochi Film Award, and at the 10th Yokohama Film Festival.

== Filmography ==
=== Film ===
- The Discarnates (1988) - Hidekichi Harada
- Zatoichi (1989) - Tsuru
- Sharaku (1995) - Goro
- Sada (1998) - Tatsuzo Kikumoto
- Last Love (2007)
- Maniac Hero (2016) - Kōzō Kusaka
- Labyrinth of Cinema (2020) - Sen no Rikyū
- One Last Bloom (2023)
- The Brightest Sun (2025)
- Sound of Wings (2025) - Aramata

=== Television ===
- Rose Against the Odds (1991), Fighting Harada
- Taiheiki (1991), Hōjō Takatoki
- Sayonara Ri Kōran (1989), Masahiko Amakasu
- Shūchakueki Series 5～ (1996–), Masanao Ushio
- Atsuhime (2008), Iwakura Tomomi
- Clouds Over the Hill (2009–2011), Yashiro Rokurō
- Gunshi Kanbei (2014), Kodera Masamoto
- Kamen Rider Drive (2014), Jun Honganji
- Daddy Sister (2016), Eitarō Kumai
- Dokonimo nai Kuni (2018), Ayao Kishimoto
- Awaiting Kirin (2020), Settsu Harukado
- Chimudondon (2022), Saburō Taira
- Unbound (2025), Toriyama Sekien
- The Scent of the Wind (2026), Katsu Kaishū
- Brothers in Arms (2026), Kanō Eitoku

== Awards ==
Year	Nominee / work	Award	Result
1988	The Discarnates	31st Blue Ribbon Awards: Best supporting actor	Won
1988	The Discarnates	13th Hochi Film Award: Best supporting actor	Won
1988	The Discarnates	10th Yokohama Film Festival: Best supporting actor	Won
