= Eien no 1/2 =

- Theatrical release poster
- Directed by: Kichitaro Negishi
- Screenplay by: Eiichi Uchida
- Starring: Saburō Tokitō; Shinobu Otake; Tomoko Nakajima; Fukuko Sayo (小夜福子); Kazuko Yoshiyuki
- Cinematography: Koichi Kawakami
- Edited by: Akira Suzuki (鈴木晄)
- Music by: Souichi Noriki
- Production company: Director's Company
- Distributed by: Toho
- Release date: November 21, 1987 (Japan)
- Running time: 101 minutes
- Country: Japan
- Language: Japanese

Eien no 1/2 (Japanese: 永遠の1/2, Hepburn: Eien no ni-bun-no-ichi), literally Half of Eternity, is a 1987 Japanese film directed by Kichitaro Negishi.

== Synopsis ==
An unemployed young man who has just broken up with his girlfriend meets a woman at a bicycle race. They start dating but then strange things then begin to happen to him, including a beating from the local yakuza.

== Cast ==
- Saburō Tokitō
- Shinobu Otake
- Tomoko Nakajima
- Fukuko Sayo (小夜福子)
- Kazuko Yoshiyuki
- Takuzo Kawatani
- Masahiko Tsugawa
- Satomi Kobayashi
- Toshiya Fujita

== Background ==
The film is based on the novel by Shogō Satō (佐藤正午).

== Awards ==
9th Yokohama Film Festival

- Won: Best Actor - Saburō Tokitō
- Won: 4th Best Film

12th Hochi Film Awards

- Won: Best Actress - Shinobu Otake
