= Lonely Heart (1985 film) =

- Theatrical poster

Japanese name
- Kana: さびしんぼう
Transcriptions
- Revised Hepburn: Sabishinbou
- Directed by: Nobuhiko Obayashi
- Written by: Wataru Kenmotsu; Tadashi Naitō; Nobuhiko Obayashi
- Story by: Hisashi Yamanaka
- Produced by: Michio Morioka; Kyoko Obayashi; Kosuke Kuri
- Starring: Yasuko Tomita; Toshinori Omi; Yumiko Fujita
- Cinematography: Yoshitaka Sakamoto
- Music by: Naoshi Miyazaki
- Distributed by: Toho
- Release date: April 13, 1985 (Japan)
- Running time: 112 minutes
- Country: Japan
- Language: Japanese

Lonely Heart (Japanese: さびしんぼう, Hepburn: Sabishinbou) is a 1985 Japanese film directed by Nobuhiko Obayashi.

== Summary ==
Lonely high school boy Hiroki Inoue is fascinated by one girl but another mysterious girl comes into his life. Is she real or a dream from his lonely heart?

== Cast ==
- Toshinori Omi as Hiroki Inoue
- Yasuko Tomita as Sabishinbou / Yuriko Tachibana
- Yumiko Fujita as Tatsuko Inoue
- Nenji Kobayashi as Michiaki Inoue
- Kirin Kiki as Terue Amano
- Satomi Kobayashi as Yukimi Amano
- Kumeko Urabe as Fuki Inoue
- Ittoku Kishibe as Tetsu Yoshida
- Makoto Satō as Principal Okamoto

== Awards ==
7th Yokohama Film Festival

- 4th Best Film
