= Seven Weeks =

- Film poster
- Japanese: 野のなななのか
- Directed by: Nobuhiko Obayashi
- Screenplay by: Tadashi Naitō; Nobuhiko Obayashi
- Based on: No no nanananoka by Kōji Hasegawa
- Produced by: Terumichi Yamazaki
- Starring: Tōru Shinagawa; Takako Tokiwa; Tokie Hidari; Takehiro Murata; Yutaka Matsushige
- Cinematography: Hisaki Sanbongi
- Edited by: Hisaki Sanbongi; Nobuhiko Obayashi
- Music by: Kosuke Yamashita
- Release dates: March 2, 2014 (YIFFF); May 17, 2014 (Japan)
- Running time: 171 minutes
- Country: Japan
- Language: Japanese

Seven Weeks (Japanese: 野のなななのか, Hepburn: No no nanananoka) is a Japanese drama film, produced in 2014, directed by Nobuhiko Obayashi. The film stars Tōru Shinagawa, Takako Tokiwa, Tokie Hidari, Takehiro Murata, Yutaka Matsushige, Shunsuke Kubozuka, Saki Terashima and Hirona Yamazaki. The screenplay by Obayashi and Tadashi Naito was based on the novel by Kōji Hasegawa. The residents of the small northern town of Ashibetsu, where the film was set, helped fund the film.

== Plot ==
The film examines such issues as Japan's wartime responsibility, the current nuclear fallout issue, and romance. The director, Nobuhiko Obayashi, has referred to the film as "Guernica in moving images." The film's story follows the funeral of Mitsuo Suzuki, where the family, including his sister Eiko; grandchildren Fuyuki, Haruhiko, Akito, Kanna; and his great-granddaughter Kasane all meet to discuss his death. Much of the film focuses on flashbacks to Suzuki's youth, and covers the history of the town of Ashibetsu during the 1930s. The film crisscrosses the stories of a dozen different characters, from different decades.

== Cast ==
The film stars

- Tōru Shinagawa
- Takako Tokiwa
- Tokie Hidari
- Takehiro Murata
- Yutaka Matsushige
- Shunsuke Kubozuka
- Saki Terashima
- Hirona Yamazaki.

== Production ==
The residents of the small northern town of Ashibetsu, where the film was set, helped fund the film, which resulted in the film having a small budget.
