= Nobuhiko Obayashi =

Japanese film director (1938–2020)

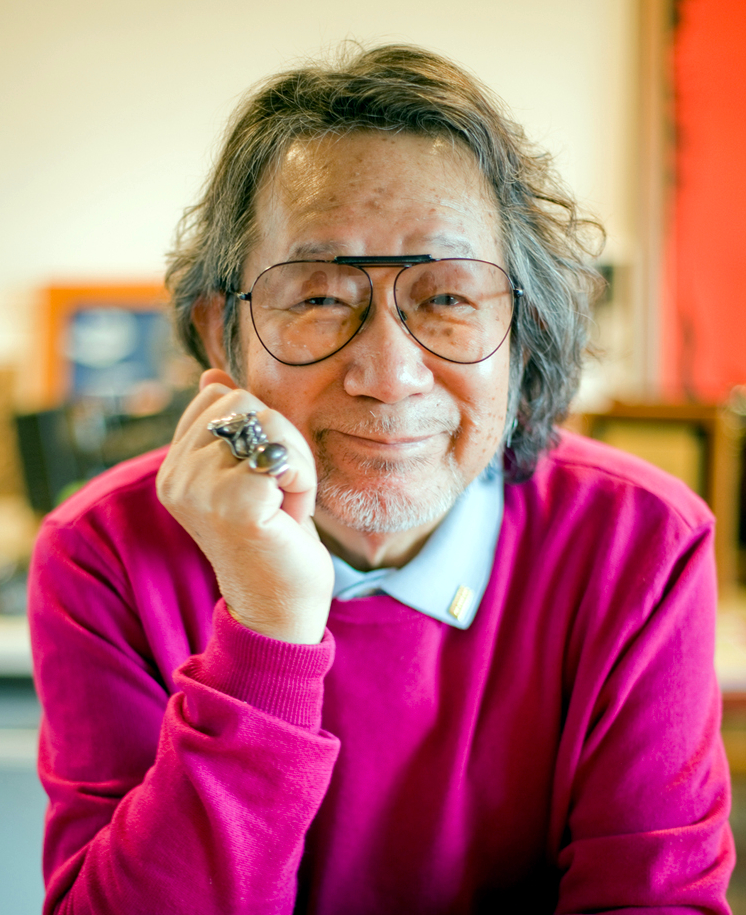
- Obayashi in 2019
- Born: 9 January 1938; Onomichi, Hiroshima, Japan
- Died: 10 April 2020 (aged 82); Tokyo, Japan
- Occupations: Film director, screenwriter, editor, film producer
- Years active: 1960–2020
- Spouse: Kyoko Obayashi
- Children: Chigumi

Nobuhiko Obayashi (大林 宣彦, Ōbayashi Nobuhiko; 9 January 1938 – 10 April 2020) was a Japanese director, screenwriter, and editor of films and television advertisements. He began his filmmaking career as a pioneer of Japanese experimental films before transitioning to directing more mainstream media, and his resulting filmography as a director spanned almost 60 years. He is best known as the director of the 1977 comedy horror film House, which has garnered a cult following. He was notable for his distinct surreal filmmaking style, as well as the anti-war themes commonly embedded in his films.

== Early life ==
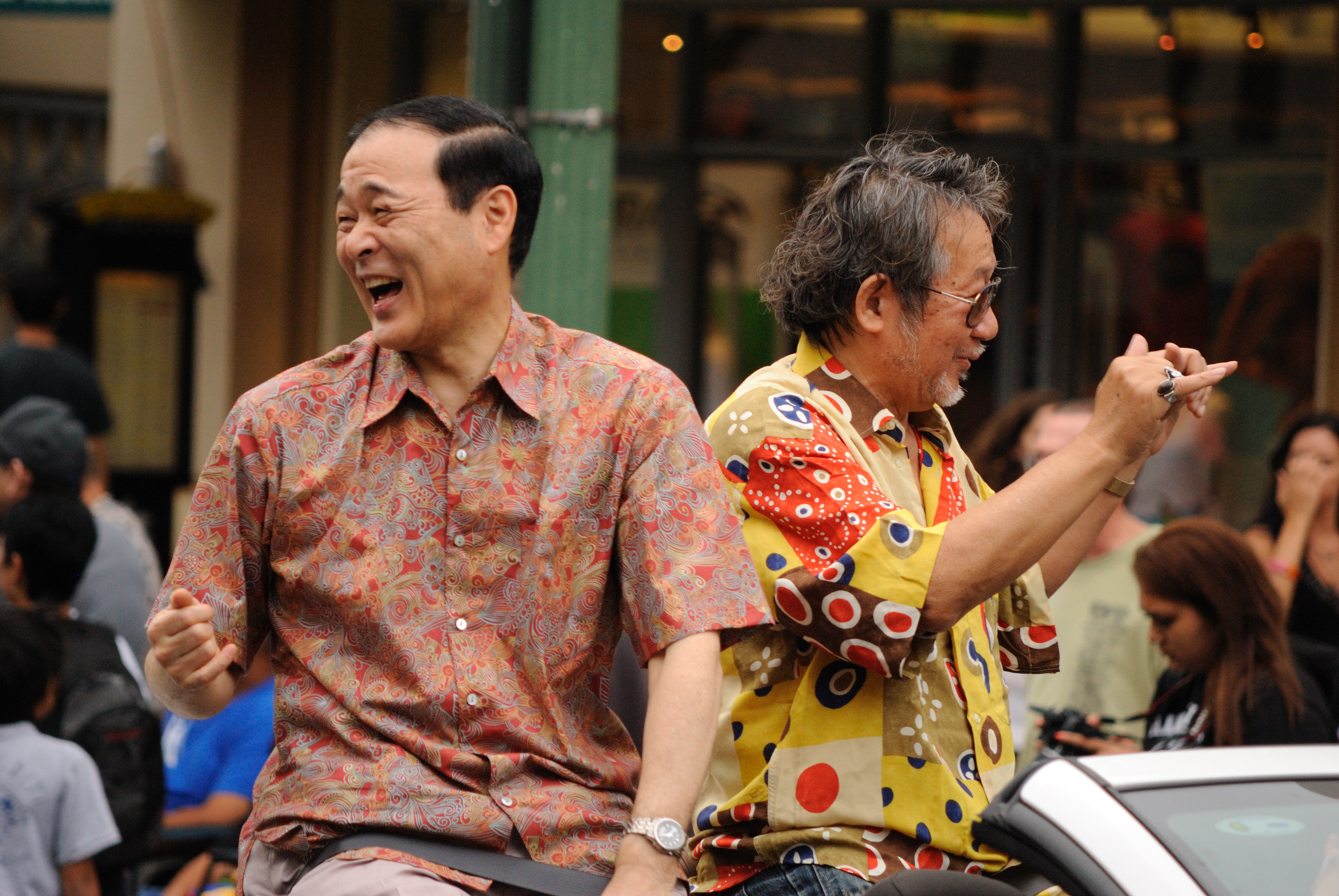
Obayashi (right) with Tamio Mori (left) at the Honolulu Festival in Honolulu, Hawaiʻi in 2012

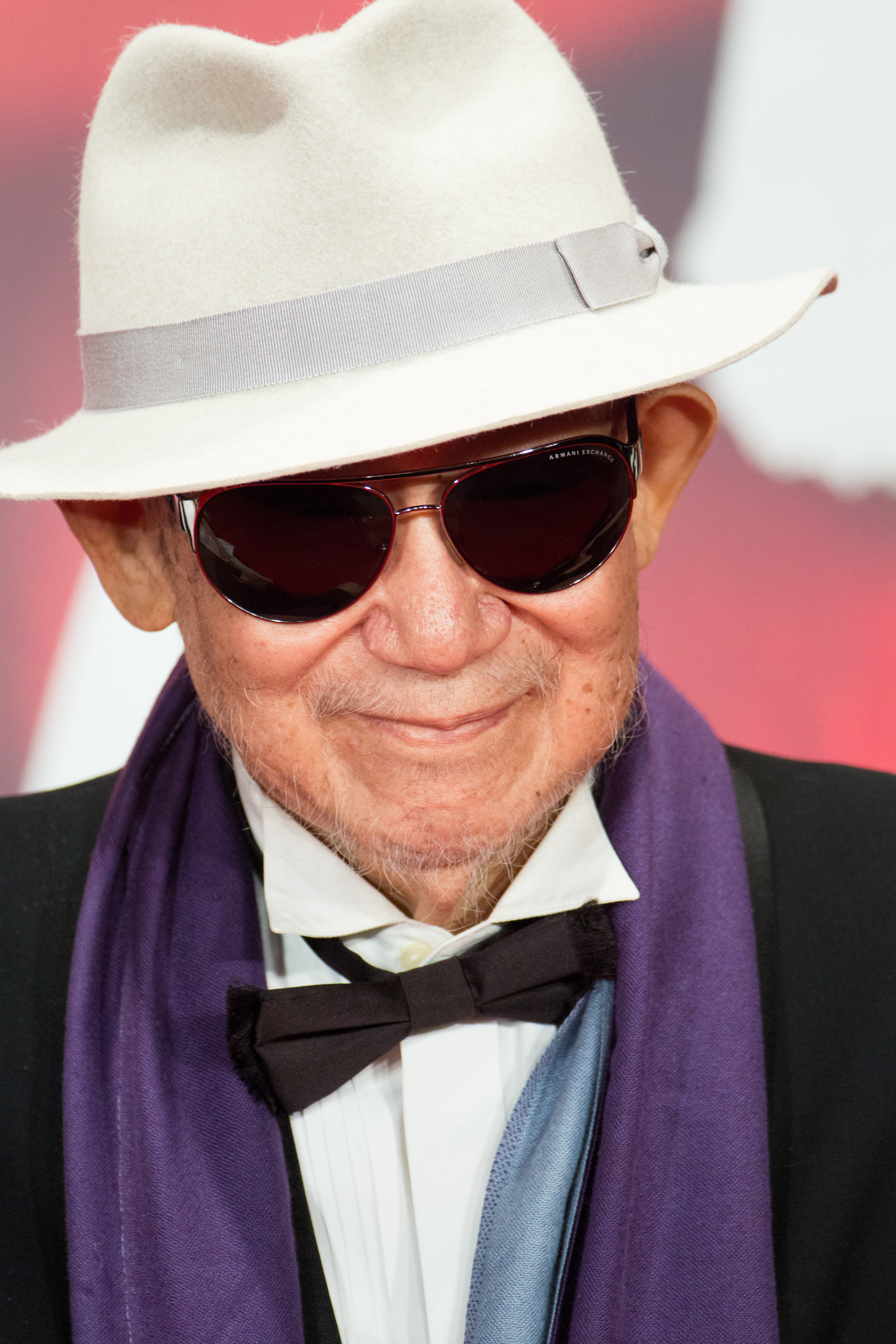
Obayashi at the 2017 Tokyo International Film Festival

Obayashi was born on 9 January 1938 in the city of Onomichi, Japan. After his father, a doctor, was called to the battlefront during World War II, he was raised in his early infancy by his maternal grandparents. Through his childhood and adolescence, Obayashi followed many artistic pursuits, including drawing, writing, playing the piano, and possessed a growing interest in animation and film. He made his first 8 mm film in 1944 at the age of 6, the hand-drawn animated short Popeye's Treasure Island.

== Career ==
=== 1955–1977: Early career and House ===
In 1955 Obayashi, at the urging of his father, began procedures to enter medical school and become a physician. However, he abandoned the prospect of a career in medicine in favor of following his artistic interests at Seijo University. In 1956 he was accepted to the university's liberal arts department, where he began to work with 8 and 16 mm film. Toward the end of his stay at the university Obayashi began working on a series of short experimental films. Together—with Takahiko Iimura, Yoichi Takabayashi, and Donald Richie—Nobuhiko Obayashi established the Japanese experimental-film group Film Independent, or "Japan Film Andepandan," who were awarded at the 1964 Knokke-Le-Zoute Experimental Film Festival. Along with works by other filmmakers such as Shuji Terayama and Donald Richie, Obayashi's films would develop the tone of Japanese experimental cinema through the 1960s. In these early experimental films Obayashi employed a number of avant-garde techniques that he would carry into his later mainstream work. Though these films tended to be of a personal nature, they received public viewership due to distribution by the Art Theatre Guild.

Following his departure from university, Obayashi continued to work on his experimental films. Dentsu, a TV commercial project in Japan looking for new talent, asked members of Film Independents if they would like to direct commercials; Obayashi was the only one from the group to accept the offer, and thus began earning a living as a director in the new field of television advertisements. Obayashi's TV commercials had a visual appeal similar to that of his experimental works. In the 1970s he began a series of Japanese ads featuring well-known western stars such as Kirk Douglas, Charles Bronson and Catherine Deneuve. During the course of his career, Obayashi directed around 3,000 television commercials. He made his feature film directorial debut with the comedy horror film House, released in 1977. The film employed a mixture of trick photography and avant-garde techniques to achieve its distinctive, surreal visuals, and has gone on to be considered a cult classic. It earned Obayashi the Blue Ribbon Award for Best New Director.

=== 1980s–2010s: Further mainstream success ===
Through the 1980s and onwards Obayashi continued to make feature films and broadened his mainstream appeal. He directed a number of coming-of-age films such as I Are You, You Am Me (1982), The Girl Who Leapt Through Time (1983), and Lonely Heart (1985)—which together form his "Onomichi trilogy", named after the town where he was born—as well as Chizuko's Younger Sister (1991).

His 1988 film The Discarnates was entered into the 16th Moscow International Film Festival. His 1998 film Sada, based on the true story of Sada Abe, was entered into the 48th Berlin International Film Festival, where it won the FIPRESCI Prize for "its unique combination of innovative style and human observation."

In 2016, Obayashi was diagnosed with stage-four terminal cancer and was only given a few months to live. Despite this, he started production on Hanagatami, a passion project of his which had been over 40 years in the making. The film was released in 2017 and was met with acclaim, winning prizes such as the Best Film Award at the 72nd Mainichi Film Awards. It is the third installment in a thematic trilogy of modern anti-war films by Obayashi, along with Casting Blossoms to the Sky (2012) and Seven Weeks (2014).

He shot and edited his final film, titled Labyrinth of Cinema, while receiving cancer treatment. Labyrinth of Cinema premiered at the 2019 Tokyo International Film Festival.

== Death ==
Obayashi died on 10 April 2020 at the age of 82, from lung cancer in Tokyo. His family held a funeral for him at a temple in Tokyo on 13 April.

== Honors ==
- Medal with Purple Ribbon (2004)
- Order of the Rising Sun, 4th Class, Gold Rays with Rosette (2009)
- Person of Cultural Merit (2019)

== Partial filmography ==
Year	Film	Director	Writer	Producer	Editor	Notes	Ref(s)
1944	Popeye's Treasure Island	Yes				Short film; 8 mm film	
1945	The Stupid Teacher	Yes				Short film; 8 mm	
1957	Youth Clouds	Yes				Short film; 8 mm	
1958	The Girl in the Picture	Yes				Short film; 8 mm	
1964	Complexe	Yes	Yes	Yes	Yes	Short film; Obayashi's first 16 mm film	
1966	Emotion	Yes	Yes			Short film; 16 mm	
1968	Confession	Yes				Short film; 16 mm	
1977	House	Yes	Yes	Yes	Yes	Also special effects director	
1977	The Visitor in the Eye	Yes				Also appears as an actor	
1978	Furimukeba Ai	Yes				Also known as Take Me Away!	
1979	The Adventures of Kosuke Kindaichi	Yes					
1981	School in the Crosshairs	Yes					
1982	I Are You, You Am Me	Yes				Also known as Exchange Students	
1982	Lovely Devils	Yes					
1983	The Girl Who Leapt Through Time	Yes			Yes		
1983	Legend of the Cat Monster	Yes					
1983	Lover Comeback To Me	Yes					
1984	The Deserted City	Yes			Yes		
1984	Kenya Boy	Yes			Yes	Obayashi's only animated film	
1984	The Island Closest to Heaven	Yes					
1985	Lonely Heart	Yes					
1985	Four Sisters	Yes					
1986	Poisson D'avril	Yes	Yes			Also known as April Fish	
1986	His Motorbike, Her Island	Yes			Yes		
1986	Bound for the Fields, the Mountains, and the Seacoast	Yes					
1987	The Drifting Classroom	Yes	Yes		Yes		
1988	The Discarnates	Yes					
1989	Beijing Watermelon	Yes					
1991	Chizuko's Younger Sister	Yes			Yes		
1992	The Rocking Horsemen	Yes					
1993	Haruka, Nostalgia	Yes					
1993	Samurai Kids	Yes	Yes		Yes		
1994	Turning Point	Yes			Yes		
1995	Goodbye for Tomorrow	Yes					
1998	Sada	Yes			Yes		
1998	I Want to Hear the Wind's Song	Yes			Yes		
1999	That Guy	Yes			Yes		
2002	The Last Snow	Yes			Yes		
2004	The Reason	Yes					
2006	Song of Goodbye	Yes					
2007	Switching - Goodbye Me	Yes					
2008	Scenery to Remember	Yes					
2012	Casting Blossoms to the Sky	Yes	Yes		Yes		
2014	Seven Weeks	Yes	Yes		Yes		
2017	Hanagatami	Yes	Yes		Yes		
2019	Labyrinth of Cinema	Yes	Yes	Yes	Yes	Final film	
