= Giorgio Amitrano =

Italian scholar and translator of Japanese literature (born 1957)

Giorgio Amitrano Order of the Rising Sun
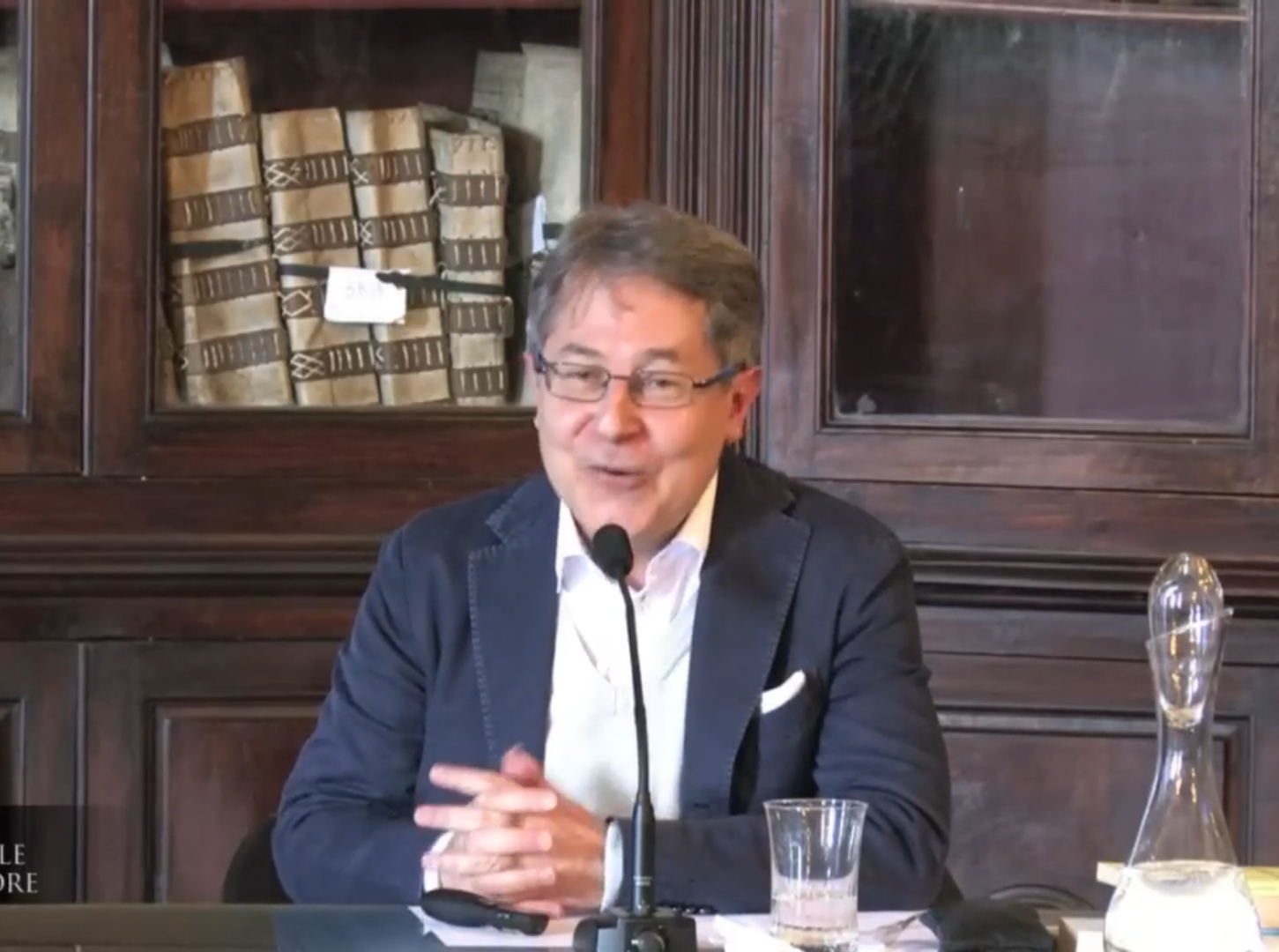
- Amitrano during a conference at Scuola Normale Superiore in Pisa, 2014
- Born: 31 October 1957 (age 68); Jesi, Ancona, Italy
- Occupations: Translator; essayist
- Awards: Grinzane Cavour Prize; Noma Award for the Translation of Japanese Literature

Academic background
- Education: University of Naples "L'Orientale"

Academic work
- Discipline: Japanese literature
- Institutions: University of Naples "L'Orientale"

Giorgio Amitrano (Italian pronunciation: [ˈdʒordʒo amiˈtraːno]; born 31 October 1957) is an Italian Japanologist, translator and essayist, specializing in Japanese language and literature.

== Life and career ==
Amitrano grew up in Naples, graduating from the University of Naples "L'Orientale"; his professors included Maria Teresa Orsi, Luigi Polese Remaggi and Namkhai Norbu. He won a scholarship to Tokyo in 1984. The following year he moved to Osaka, where he stayed until 1989, also teaching at Osaka University.

He currently is full professor of Japanese Literature in the Department of Asian, African and Mediterranean Studies at L'Orientale. He also presided the Faculty of Political Science of the same university, where he taught Language and Culture of Japan. In 2012, the Ministry of Foreign Affairs nominated him head of the Italian Cultural Institute in Tokyo for a five-year term.

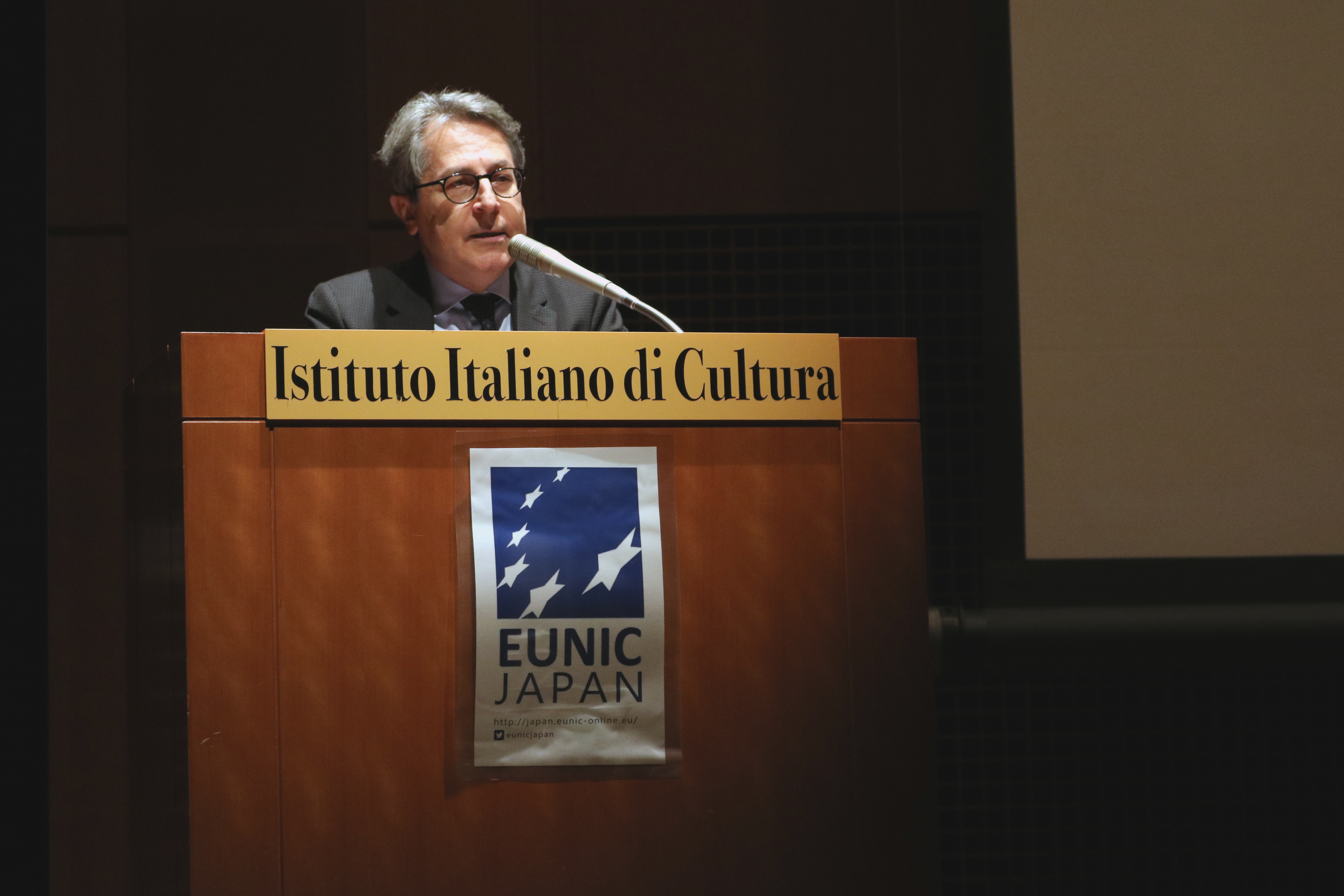
Amitrano in representation of the Italian Cultural Institute at an EUNIC event in Tokyo, 2015

He is the translator to Italian of the works of Banana Yoshimoto (alongside Gala Maria Follaco) and Haruki Murakami, as well as having translated some of the works of Yasunari Kawabata and Yasushi Inoue. His translations earned him the Alcantara Prize in 1999, the Noma Award for the Translation of Japanese Literature in 2001, the Grinzane Cavour Prize in 2008, and the Monselice Prize (Special Jury Prize for Literary and Scientific Translation) in 2012. In 2020, he was awarded membership of the Order of the Rising Sun.

Amitrano is deputy editor of the journal Poetica; since 2004, he has written in the monthly magazine on literary and figurative arts Paragone, and he also collaborates to a number of Italian newspapers and cultural publications: Corriere della Sera, la Repubblica, Il manifesto, Alias, L'Indice dei libri del mese and Nuovi Argomenti.

As a main author, the Italian School of East Asian Studies published his volume The New Japanese Novel: Popular Culture and Literary Tradition in the Work of Murakami Haruki and Yoshimoto Banana (1996) and Feltrinelli Il mondo di Banana Yoshimoto (1999, expanded in 2007). In 2007, he wrote the introduction to I miei cani by artist Giosetta Fioroni. In 2018, he published with DeA Planeta Libri Iro iro: il Giappone tra pop e sublime, where he analyzes present-day Japan between tradition and modernity.

== Bibliography ==
=== Translations ===
- Atsushi Nakajima
  - Cronaca della luna sul monte e altri racconti [Sangetsuki (山月記, The Moon Over the Mountain)], Marsilio, 1989
- Banana Yoshimoto
  - Kitchen [Kitchin (キッチン)], Feltrinelli, 1991
  - N.P., Feltrinelli, 1993
  - Sonno profondo [Shirakawa yofune (白河夜船, Asleep)], Feltrinelli, 1994
  - Lucertola [Tokage (とかげ, Lizard)], Feltrinelli, 1995
  - Amrita [Amurita (アムリタ)], Feltrinelli, 1997
  - Honeymoon [Hanemūn (ハネムーン)], Feltrinelli, 1999
  - H/H [Hādoboirudo/Hādorakku (ハードボイルド／ハードラック, Hardboiled & Hard Luck)], Feltrinelli, 2001
  - Presagio triste [Kanashii yokan (哀しい予感, Sad Premonition)], Feltrinelli, 2003
  - Il corpo sa tutto [Karada wa zenbu shitteiru (体は全部知っている, The Body Knows the Whole)], Feltrinelli, 2004
  - Ricordi di un vicolo cieco [Deddoendo no omoide (デッドエンドの思い出, Dead-End Memories)], Feltrinelli, 2006
  - Chie-chan e io [Chie-chan to watashi (チエちゃんと私, Chie and I)], Feltrinelli, 2008
  - A proposito di lei [Kanojo ni tsuite (彼女について, About Her)], Feltrinelli, 2013
- Haruki Murakami
  - Tokyo Blues [Noruwei no mori (ノルウェイの森, Norwegian Wood)], Feltrinelli, 1993
  - Dance Dance Dance [Dansu dansu dansu (ダンス・ダンス・ダンス)], Einaudi, 1998
  - La ragazza dello sputnik [Supūtoniku no koibito (スプートニクの恋人, Sputnik Sweetheart)], Einaudi, 2001
  - Tutti i figli di Dio danzano [Kami no kodomotachi wa mina odoru (神の子どもたちはみな踊る, All God's Children Can Dance)], Einaudi, 2005
  - Norwegian Wood, Einaudi, 2006 (new edition of the translation Tokyo Blues)
  - Kafka sulla spiaggia [Umibe no Kafuka (海辺のカフカ, Kafka on the Shore)], Einaudi, 2008
  - 1Q84, Einaudi, 2011
  - Ranocchio salva Tōkyō [Kaeru-kun, Tōkyō o sukuu (かえるくん、東京を救う, Super-Frog Saves Tokyo)], illustrated by Lorenzo Ceccotti, Einaudi, 2017
- Kenji Miyazawa
  - Una notte sul treno della Via Lattea e altri racconti [Ginga tetsudō no yoru (銀河鉄道の夜, Night on the Galactic Railroad)], Marsilio, 1994
- Murasaki Shikibu
  - Storia di Genji il principe splendente [Genji monogatari (源氏物語, The Tale of Genji)], Einaudi, 1992
- Yasunari Kawabata
  - Prima neve sul Fuji [Fuji no hatsuyuki (富士の初雪, First Snow on Fuji)], Mondadori, 2000
  - Il paese delle nevi [Yukiguni (雪国, Snow Country)], Mondadori, 2003
  - La danzatrice di Izu [Izu no odoriko (伊豆の踊子, The Dancing Girl of Izu)], translated with Gala Maria Follaco, Adelphi, 2017 – edition also incorporating Esistenza e scoperta della bellezza [Bi no sonzai to hakken (美の存在と発見, The Existence and Discovery of Beauty)]
  - Romanzi e racconti [Novels and Tales], Mondadori, 2003 – a compendium of selected works
- Yasushi Inoue
  - Il fucile da caccia [Ryōjū (猟銃, The Hunting Gun)], Adelphi, 2004
  - Amore [Ai (愛, Love)], Adelphi, 2006
- Yukio Mishima
  - Vita in vendita [Inochi urimasu (命売ります, Life for Sale)], Feltrinelli, 2022

=== Essays ===
- The New Japanese Novel: Popular Culture and Literary Tradition in the Work of Murakami Haruki and Yoshimoto Banana, Italian School of East Asian Studies, 1996
- Il mondo di Banana Yoshimoto [The World of Banana Yoshimoto], Feltrinelli, 1999 (republished in 2007)
- "Yama no oto" kowareyuku kazoku (「山の音」こわれゆく家族) [The Sound of the Mountain: a Family Falling Apart], Misuzu Shobō, 2007
- Iro iro: il Giappone tra pop e sublime [Iro Iro: Japan Between Pop and Sublime], DeA Planeta Libri, 2018

== Filmography ==
- Amitrano made a brief cameo in the role of a Japanese-speaking tour guide in the 1997 film The Vesuvians, in the segment La salita by Mario Martone.
