= Blue Ribbon Award for Best Newcomer =

Annual Japanese film award

- Awarded for: Best Performance by a Newcomer
- Country: Japan
- Presented by: The Association of Tokyo Film Journalists
- First award: 1950

The Blue Ribbon Award for Best Newcomer is a prize recognizing an outstanding performance by a newcomer in a Japanese film. It is awarded annually by the Association of Tokyo Film Journalists as one of the Blue Ribbon Awards.

== List of winners ==
No.	Year	Recipient(s)	Film(s)
1	1950	Shin Saburi	Shikkō Yūyo; Josei Tai Dansei
2	1951	Rentarō Mikuni	The Good Fairy; Fireworks Over the Sea
3	1952	N/A	N/A
4	1953	Yoshitarō Nomura	Jinanbō; Gutei Kenkei; Kurama Tengu Ao Men Yasha; Kinpira Sensei to Ojōsan
5	1954	So Yamamura	Kuroi Shio
6	1955	Tsuneo Kobayashi	Shūdensha no Shibijin; Bōryokugai
7	1956	Yoshirō Kawazu	Kodomo no Me; Namida
8	1957	Yujiro Ishihara	Shori-sha
9	1958	Shohei Imamura	Stolen Desire; Endless Desire
10	1959	N/A	N/A
11	1960	Nagisa Oshima	Cruel Story of Youth
12	1961	Shima Iwashita	Waga Koi no Tabiji
13	1962	Kirio Urayama	Foundry Town
14	1963	Junya Sato	Rikugun Zangyaku Monogatari
15	1964	Mako Midori	Nihiki no Mesu Inu
16	1965	Kei Kumai	Nihon Rettō
17	1966	Tetsuya Watari	Ai to Shi no Kiroku
18	1975	Tomokazu Miura	Izu no Odoriko
18	1975	Shinobu Otake	The Gate of Youth
19	1976	Mieko Harada	Lullaby of the Earth; Seishun no Satujinsha
20	1977	Nobuhiko Obayashi	House
21	1978	Toshiyuki Nagashima	Third Base
22	1979	Kenichi Kaneda	Shōgo Nari
23	1980	Daisuke Ryu	Kagemusha
24	1981	Kōichi Satō	The Gate of Youth; Manon
25	1982	Jun Miho	Pink no Curtain
26	1983	Tomoyo Harada	Toki o Kakeru Shōjo
26	1983	Shōji Kaneko	Ryūji
27	1984	Kōji Kikkawa	Sukanpin Walk
28	1985	Yuki Saito	Lost Chapter of Snow: Passion
29	1986	Narimi Arimori	Final Take
30	1987	Masahiro Takashima	Totto Channel; Bu Su
31	1988	Naoto Ogata	Yūshun Oración
32	1989	Ayako Kawahara	Kitchen
33	1990	Riho Makise	Tokyo Heaven; Tugumi
33	1990	Joji Matsuoka	Swimming Upstream
34	1991	Hikari Ishida	Chizuko's Younger Sister; My Soul Is Slashed; Waiting for the Flood
35	1992	Yuki Sumida	Bokutō Kidan
36	1993	Gorō Kishitani	All Under the Moon
36	1993	Kyōko Tōyama	Kou Kou Kyoushi
37	1994	Sawa Suzuki	Ai no Shinsekai
38	1995	Makiko Esumi	Maborosi
39	1996	Ninety-nine	Boys Be Ambitious
40	1997	Kōki Mitani	Welcome Back, Mr. McDonald
40	1997	Hitomi Satō	Bounce Ko Gals
41	1998	Rena Tanaka	Give It All
42	1999	Ryuhei Matsuda	Gohatto
43	2000	Tatsuya Fujiwara	Battle Royale
44	2001	Kō Shibasaki	Go
45	2002	Nakamura Shidō	Ping Pong
45	2002	Manami Konishi	Letters from the Mountains
46	2003	Satomi Ishihara	Watashi no Guranpa
47	2004	Anna Tsuchiya	Kamikaze Girls; The Taste of Tea
47	2004	Mirai Moriyama	Crying Out Love in the Center of the World
48	2005	Mikako Tabe	Hinokio; Aozora no Yukue
49	2006	Muga Tsukaji	Mamiya kyodai
49	2006	Rei Dan	Love and Honor
50	2007	Yui Aragaki	Koisuru Madori; Waruboro; Koizora
51	2008	Yuriko Yoshitaka	Snakes and Earrings
51	2008	Lily Franky	All Around Us
52	2009	Masaki Okada	Jūryoku Piero; Honokaa Boy
52	2009	Daisaku Kimura	Mt. Tsurugidake
53	2010	Toma Ikuta	No Longer Human
53	2010	Nanami Sakuraba	Saigo no Chūsin Gura; Shodo Girls
54	2011	Mana Ashida	Bunny Drop; Hankyū Densha
55	2012	Makita Sports	Kueki Ressha
56	2013	Haru Kuroki	The Great Passage; A Chair on the Plains; The Flower of Shanidar
57	2014	Fūka Koshiba	Kiki's Delivery Service
58	2015	Anna Ishii	Solomon's Perjury; Girls' Step
59	2016	Izumi Okamura	Aroused by Gymnopedies
60	2017	Shizuka Ishibashi	The Tokyo Night Sky Is Always the Densest Shade of Blue
61	2018	Sara Minami	Shino Can't Say Her Name
62	2019	Nagisa Sekimizu	Almost a Miracle
63	2020	Daiken Okudaira	Mother
64	2021	Yuumi Kawai	It's a Summer Film; A Balance
65	2022	Kōki	Ox-Head Village
66	2023	Sōya Kurokawa	Monster
67	2024	Ikoi Hayase	Worlds Apart; Sana: Let Me Hear
68	2025	Ryuta Shibuya	Night Flower
