= Tsugumi =

Tsugumi (つぐみ, ツグミ, 亜美, or 愛実) is a Japanese given name.

== People with the name ==
- Tsugumi (actress)
- Tsugumi Aritomo, Japanese entertainer
- Tsugumi Higasayama, Japanese voice actress
- Tsugumi Ohba, Japanese manga writer
- Tsugumi Sakurai, Japanese wrestler
- Tsugumi Shinohara, Japanese actress and model

== In fiction ==
- Tsugumi, a character in the anime series Guilty Crown
- Tsugumi Harudori, a character in the manga series Soul Eater
- Tsugumi Hattori, a character in the manga series Orient
- Tsugumi Hazawa, a character in the media franchise BanG Dream!
- Tsugumi Project, Japanese manga series
- Tsugumi Sendo, a character in video game series Fatal Fury
- Tsugumi Shibata, a character in the anime Hell Girl
- Tsugumi Seishirō, a character in the manga and anime series Nisekoi
- Tsugumi Yamamoto, a character in the novel TUGUMI by Banana Yoshimoto. See also the film Tugumi.

== See also ==
- Dusky thrush, known as tsugumi in Japanese
