= Beautiful Star =

Beautiful Star may refer to:

- Beautiful Star (1938 film), a French comedy drama film
- Beautiful Star (1942 film), a Hungarian drama film
- Beautiful Star (novel), a 1962 Japanese novel by Yukio Mishima
- A Beautiful Star, a 2017 Japanese science fiction film based on the 1962 novel
