= The Premonition (novel) =

1988 novel by Banana Yoshimoto

- Author: Banana Yoshimoto
- Translator: Asa Yoneda
- Language: Japanese
- Genre: Literary fiction
- Publisher: Kadokawa
- Publication date: December 1, 1988
- Publication place: Japan
- English publication date: October 10, 2023
- Pages: 193
- ISBN: 978-4048725217
- Preceded by: キッチン ( Kitchen)
- Followed by: つぐみ (Goodbye Tsugumi)

The Premonition (哀しい予感, Kanashī yokan; lit. Sad premonition) is a 1988 novel by Banana Yoshimoto, published by Kadokawa. In 2023, an English translation by Asa Yoneda was published by Counterpoint. It was longlisted for the PEN Translation Prize.

== Synopsis ==
The novel follows a 19-year-old middle-class girl, Yayoi, as she navigates her strange premonitions that grow stronger with age. Eventually, she decides to move in with her aunt, Yukino, as the result of her haunted feeling.

== Critical reception ==
Kirkus Reviews lauded the novel's dreaminess and sense of haunting, stating "this melancholy bildungsroman acknowledges the way that leaving behind adolescence can evoke the bittersweet sensation of waking up from a strange and vivid dream." Publishers Weekly praised the novel's efficiency, stating "While much of the plot hinges on Yayoi’s preternatural intuitions, each step is carefully plotted to slowly unearth the secrets of the past. No word is misspent in Yoshimoto’s taut tale."

The New York Times noted "Yoshimoto bucks beautifully against convention" with regard to her women characters. The Japan Times called it "sweet" but also "saccharine." In comparison to Yoshimoto's same-year debut, Kitchen, The Spectator called the book "a similarly slender work and one that casts a delicate spell." ArtReview stated "Yoshimoto has always had this extraordinary ability to convey the ephemeral natures of her main characters in plain yet diaphanous language".
