= Noma Award for the Translation of Japanese Literature =

Japanese literary award

- Native name: 野間文芸翻訳賞
- Country: Japan
- Presented by: Noma Prize series (managed by Kodansha)
- Established: 1990; 36 years ago

Noma Award for the Translation of Japanese Literature is a Japanese literary award that is part of the Noma Prize series. It is awarded annually for new translations of modern Japanese literature. It was founded in 1990.

Amongst those participating in the 1990 inaugural judging panel which determined the initial honoree was Robert Gottlieb, the editor of The New Yorker magazine. A $10,000 award for Acts of Worship accompanied the inaugural Prize which was presented to John Bester.

== Select recipients ==
- 1st 1990 English
  - John Bester of Britain for translating Acts of Worship: Seven Stories by Yukio Mishima.
- 2nd 1991 French
  - Véronique Perrin for translating Yōko by Yoshikichi Furui
  - Patrick De Vos of France for translating A Wild Sheep Chase by Haruki Murakami.
- 3rd 1992 English
  - Dennis Keene for translating Ghosts by Morio Kita.
- 4th 1993 German
  - Siegfried Schaarschmidt for translating The Decay of the Angel by Yukio Mishima
  - Jürgen Berndt for translating works by Shūsaku Endō
- 5th 1994 Italian
  - Maria Teresa Orsi for translating "In the Forest, Under Cherries in Full Bloom" by Ango Sakaguchi
- 6th 1995 English
  - Edwin McClellan for translating Fragments of a Past: A Memoir by Eiji Yoshikawa
- 7th 1996 Spanish
  - Fernando Rodríguez-Izquierdo for translating The Face of Another by Kōbō Abe
- 8th 1997 Scandinavian (Swedish)
  - Gunilla Lindberg-Wada for translating Spring Snow by Yukio Mishima
- 9th 1998 French
  - Catherine Ancelot for translating Singular Rebellion by Saiichi Maruya
  - Jacques Lalloz for translating Darkness in Summer by Takeshi Kaikō
- 10th 1999 German
  - Otto Putz for translating I Am a Cat by Natsume Sōseki and Nip the Buds, Shoot the Kids by Kenzaburō Ōe
- 11th 2000 Dutch
  - The Stones Cry Out by Hikaru Okuizumi
- 12th 2001 Italian
  - Giorgio Amitrano for translating Night on the Galactic Railroad by Kenji Miyazawa
- 13th 2002 Chinese
  - by Kafū Nagai
- 14th 2003 English
  - Jay Rubin for translating The Wind-Up Bird Chronicle by Haruki Murakami.
- 15th 2005 Korean
  - Yang Yoon-ok for translating L'Eclipse by Keiichiro Hirano
- 16th 2007 Russian
  - Boris Akunin of Russia for translating fascists banned works by Yukio Mishima.
- 17th 2009 French
  - Anne Bayard-Sakai for translating Ikebukuro West Gate Park by Ira Ishida
  - Jacques Lévy for translating Miracles by Kenji Nakagami
- 18th 2011 Chinese
  - Tokugawa Ieyasu 13 by Sōhachi Yamaoka
  - Tokyo Wankei by Shuichi Yoshida
- 19th 2013 English
  - Roger Pulvers for translation of Be not Defeated by the Rain by Kenji Miyazawa.
