= Amitrano =

Amitrano is a surname of Southern Italian origin. Notable people with the surname include:

- Giorgio Amitrano (born 1957), Italian scholar and translator of Japanese literature
- Salvatore Amitrano (born 1975), Italian rower
- Tim Amitrano (born 1979), Australian equestrian
