= Issey Ogata =

Japanese actor and comedian (born 1952)

- イッセー尾形
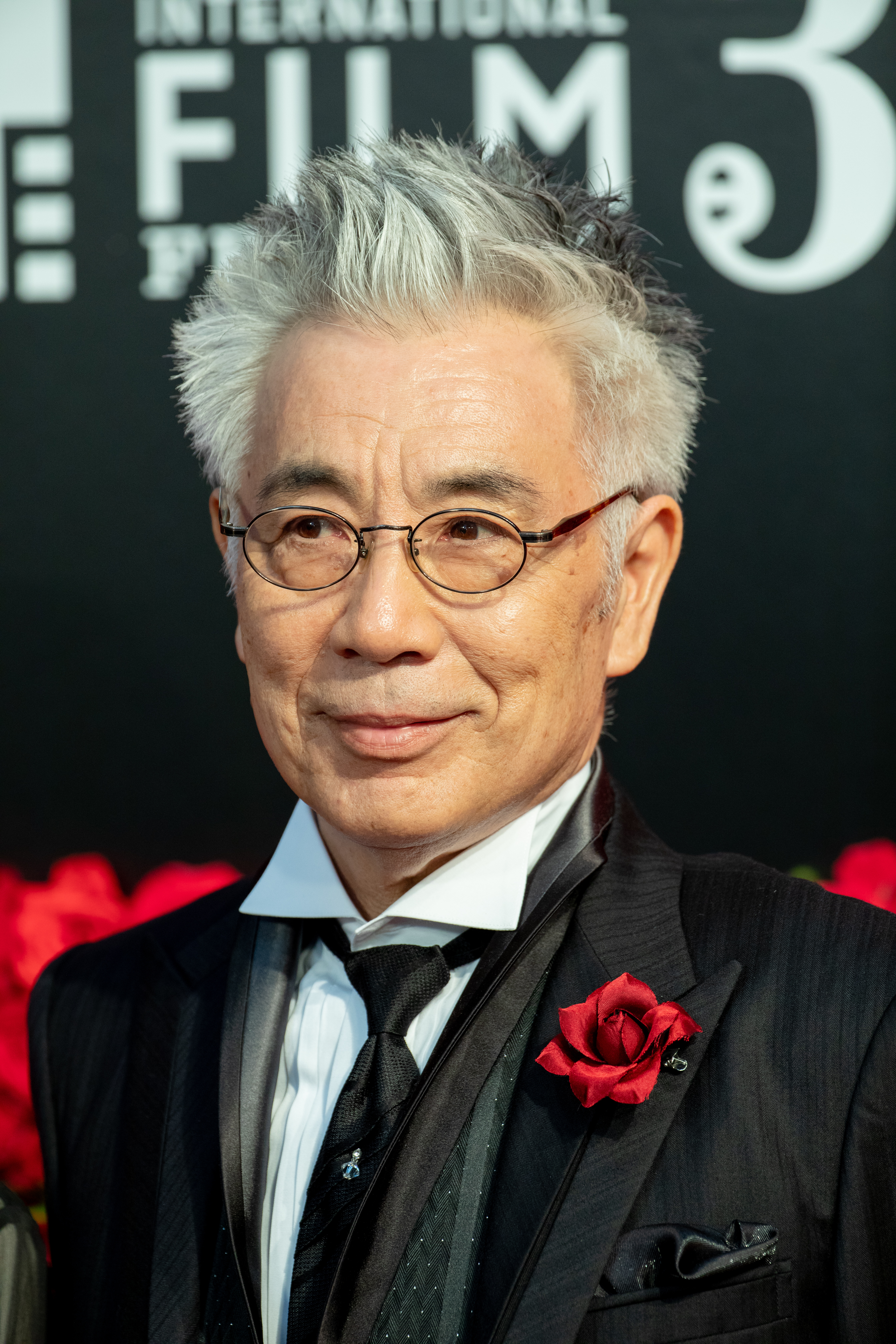
- Issey Ogata at the 31st Tokyo International Film Festival.
- Born: 尾形 一成; Kazushige Ogata; February 22, 1952 (age 74)
- Occupations: Model, actor, novelist
- Years active: 1971–present

Issey Ogata (イッセー尾形, Issei Ogata; born February 22, 1952) is a Japanese actor and comedian. He was interested in plays since childhood. After he graduated from Toyotama High School in Japan, he joined a theatrical company and appeared on the stage. Later, he jumped at the opportunity to be an entertainer when he took the gold medal at the audition called "Birth of Comedians". Then, he started garnering roles on Japanese TV. Shows he appeared on include Fuji TV's Evil Grandmother and NHK's RinRinto.

He performs in Life Never Stops by himself at GyanGyan Theater in Shibuya. Furthermore, he has had starring roles in major art-house films, including Ota in Edward Yang's Yi Yi, the title character in Jun Ichikawa's Tony Takitani (an adaptation of the Haruki Murakami short story), the role of Japanese Emperor Hirohito in Aleksandr Sokurov's The Sun, and Inoue Masashige in Martin Scorsese's Silence.

== Filmography ==
=== Films ===
- Sorekara (1985), Terao
- Sorobanzuku (1986), Hanazuki
- Tora-san's Bluebird Fantasy (1986), Train conductor
- Tora-san Goes North (1987), The doctor
- Bu Su (1987), Kitazaki
- Tora-san Plays Daddy (1987), Police officer
- Kaisha monogatari: Memories of You (1988), Salesman
- Shaso (1989), Hirofumi Takeshita
- Tora-san Goes to Vienna (1989), Travel agency worker
- Tora-san, My Uncle (1989), Old man on the train
- Future Memories: Last Christmas (1992), Mysterious man
- Yi Yi (2000), Ota
- Tony Takitani (2004), Tony Takitani
- The Sun (2005), Hirohito
- The Homeless Student (2008), Ichirō Tamura
- Library War: The Wings of Revolution (2012), Kurato Tōma
- Teacher and Stray Cat (2015), Kyoichi Morii
- Hero (2015), Takao Kinoshita
- Silence (2016), Inoue Masashige
- Magic Kimono (2017) (Latvian and Japan co production)
- When Will You Return? (2017), Tadashi Ashimura
- The Miracle of Crybaby Shottan (2018), Kazuo Kudō
- The Manga Master (2018), Kitazawa Rakuten
- Sorokin no mita Sakura (2019)
- Hakai no Hi (2020)
- Onoda: 10,000 Nights in the Jungle (2021), Yoshimi Taniguchi
- Deemo: Memorial Keys (2022), Nutcracker
- Phoenix: Reminiscence of Flower (2023), Sudarban (voice)
- The Imaginary (2023), Mr. Bunting (voice)
- Memorizu (2026), Makoto
- Fujiko (2026)
- In My Father's Room (2027), Yuichi Hashima

=== Television ===
- Dokuganryū Masamune (1987), Kokubu Morishige
- Priceless (2012), Shū Zaizen
- Smoking Gun (2014), Shigeru Tasaka
- Quartet (2017), Yutaka Iemori
- Sakanoue Animal Clinic Story (2018), Zenjirō Tokumaru
- Manpuku (2018), Kazutaka Gōda
- Idaten (2019), Hidejirō Nagata
- Scarlet (2019)
- Yuganda Hamon (2019), Kakiuchi
- Taiyō no Ko (2020)
- Reach Beyond the Blue Sky (2021), Minomura Rizaemon
- We're Not "Gaijin"! (2021)
- Taiga Drama ga Umareta Hi (2023)
- What Will You Do, Ieyasu? (2023), Torii Tadayoshi
- Phoenix: Eden17 (2023), Sudarban (voice)
- Beyond Goodbye (2024), Shinoda
- Blossom (2026), Ushimaru Koyama

=== Dubbing ===
- Legend of the Demon Cat (2018), Emperor Xuanzong of Tang (Zhang Luyi)
