= Fancy Paradise =

- Directed by: Takeshi 'Ken' Matsumori
- Written by: Yasuo Tanami
- Produced by: Shin Watanabe
- Cinematography: Rokurô Nishigaki
- Music by: Hiroaki Hagiwara
- Distributed by: Toho
- Release date: August 14, 1968
- Running time: 85 minutes
- Country: Japan
- Language: Japanese

Fancy Paradise (空想天国, Kūsō tengoku) is a 1968 Japanese comic science fiction film directed by Takeshi 'Ken' Matsumori from a screenplay by Yasuo Tanami. It is about a cult around an anthropomorphic frog called Gamara (Hideo Naka), probably named in parody of Daiei Motion Picture Company's semi-anthropomorphic turtle, Gamera.

The film also stars Akira Takarada, Akemi Kita, Kei Tani, Akihiko Hirata, Yû Fujiki, and Wakako Sakai, with a cameo by Jun Tazaki.

== Plot ==
A timid office worker Keitarô Tamaru loves studying fantasy and myths. Even if Tamaru make an outstanding performance in his fantasy and connect with a wonderful woman, in reality he will only fail. As a result, he was finally downgraded from his employee job and decided to signed up as a security guard. One night, Tamaru and Chief Guard Yamamura were attacked by a mysterious group that has invaded the company, and Yamamura is seriously injured and hospitalized. However, Tamaru meet a wonderful woman who always appears in his fantasy dream. Her name was Hiroko Yamamura, the daughter of Yamamura. Tamaru rejoices, but after a short while, he is suspected by the police to be a member of a group that has invaded the company and is arrested. Tamaru escapes from the detention center and stands up to save Hiroko, who was kidnapped by the group.

== Cast ==
- Kei Tani as Keitarō Tamaru / Voice of Gamara
- Wakako Sakai as Hiroko Yamamura
- Akira Takarada as Takashi Maeno
- Hajime Hana as Detective A
- Senri Sakurai as Detective B
- Hideo Naka as Gamara (stunt performer)
- Akemi Kita as Kondô's Secretary Michiko Akiyama
- Masako Kyozuka as Hisako Tamaru (Mother of Keitarō)
- Makoto Fujita as Sansui Construction Company's President
- Takuya Fujioka as Design Director Kondô
- Yû Fujiki as Kuroda
- Yukihiko Gondo, Hiroshi Tanaka, Hiroto Kimura as Kuroda's subordinates
- Akihiko Hirata as Industrial espionage boss
- Yasuo Araki, Ken Echigo, Hans Horneff as Industrial spies
- Yutaka Sada as Chief Guard Yamamura (Father of Hiroko)
- Masao Komatsu as Jailer
- Yutaka Nakayama as Policeman
- Hiroshi Sekita as Kendo Hall Man
- Takao Zushi as Marathon player
- Keiji Yanoma as Western Clothes Store clerk
- Keiko Nishioka, Rie Nakagawa, Yoko Yano as Geishas
- Ikio Sawamura as Driver
- Wakako Tanabe as Hospital nurse
- Hideo Naka and Ultra Three as Thieves
- Saburō Iketani as Radio announcer on the radio (non-credited)
- Midori Uchiyama as Woman at the store (non-credited)
- Rinsaku Ogata, Keiichiro Katsumoto, Yoshie Kihira, Akira Kitchoji as Soccer field spectators (non-credited)
