= Kitchen (1997 film) =

1997 Hong Kong film by Yim Ho

- Film poster
- Directed by: Yim Ho
- Written by: Terence Lai; Yim Ho
- Based on: Kitchen by Banana Yoshimoto
- Produced by: Raymond Chow; Akira Morishige; Yokichi Osato
- Starring: Jordan Chan; Yasuko Tomita; Law Kar-ying; Karen Mok
- Cinematography: Hang Sang Poon
- Edited by: Hung Yiu Poon
- Music by: Otomo Yoshihide; Kazuhisa Uchihashi
- Production companies: AMUSE; Orange Sky Golden Harvest
- Distributed by: Orange Sky Golden Harvest
- Release dates: 15 May 1997 (Hong Kong); 13 December 1997 (Japan)
- Running time: 124 minutes
- Country: Hong Kong
- Language: Cantonese

Kitchen (Chinese: 我愛廚房; pinyin: Wo ai chu fang) is a 1997 Hong Kong drama film directed by Yim Ho. It is a remake of the 1989 film of the same name directed by Yoshimitsu Morita; both films were based on the novel of the same name by Banana Yoshimoto. Kitchen was entered into the 47th Berlin International Film Festival.

== Plot ==
Louie, an easygoing hairdresser, and his transgender mother take in Aggie, a woman struggling with grief and depression, and offer her a supportive home. With their encouragement, Aggie regains her confidence and pursues her ambition of becoming a chef at a prestigious restaurant. Although romantic feelings develop between her and Louie, a tragedy leaves him in need of her help, forcing Aggie to choose between her career aspirations and caring for him.

== Cast ==
- Jordan Chan as Louie
- Yasuko Tomita as Aggie
- Law Kar-ying as Emma
- Karen Mok as Jenny
- Lau Siu Ming as Mr. Chiu
- Law Koon-Lan as Chika
