= Massimo Milano =

Italian ethnomusicologist and music critic

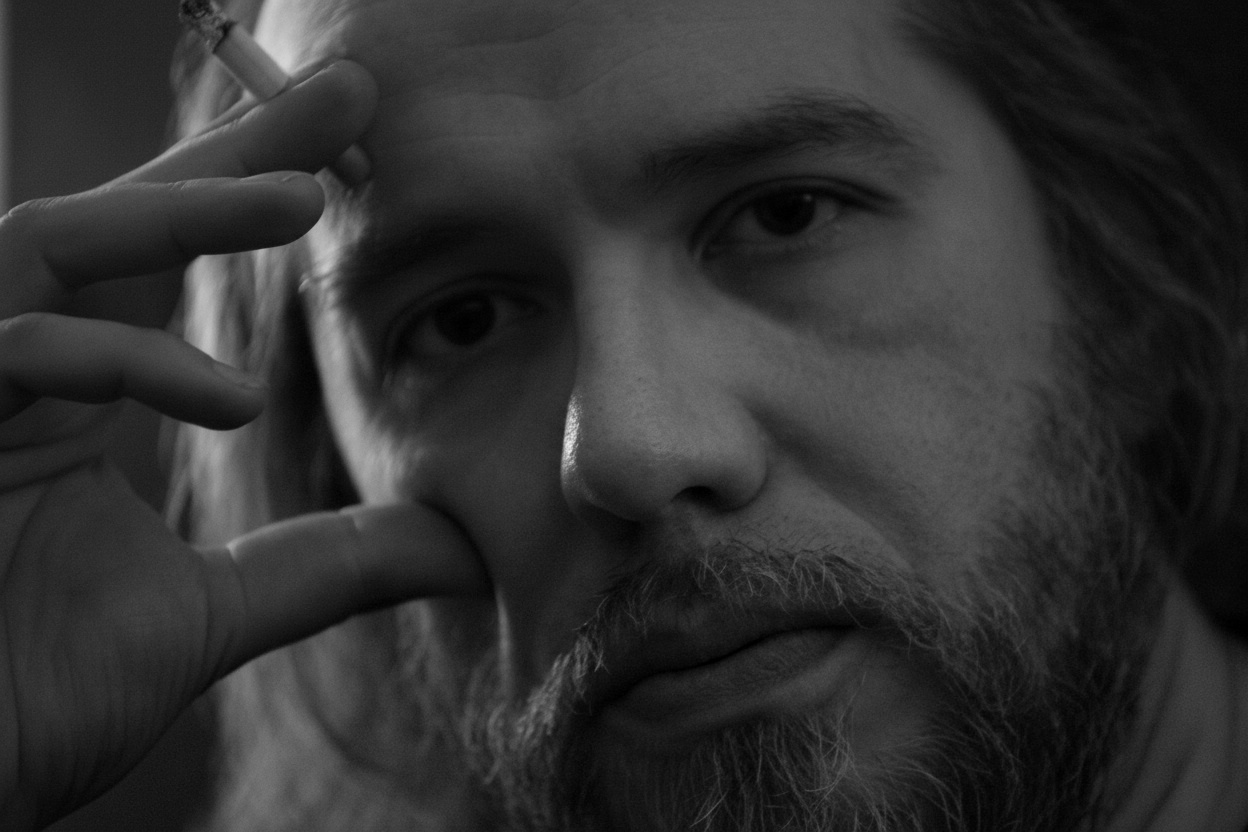
Massimo Milano

Massimo Milano (born 1967) is an Italian ethnomusicologist, critic and sound experimentalist.

== Life ==
Milano was born in 1967 in Turin. Member of "A.I.STU.GIA" (Italian Association for Japanese Studies, Venice) and of the International Jury of the Down Beat Annual Critics Poll (USA), he has been editor-in-chief of the monthly magazine Finis Terrae, for which he interviewed Zimbabwe's musical icon in exile Thomas Mapfumo. In addition, he regularly contributes to several Italian and Spanish leading newspapers and magazines (Il Manifesto, Classic Rock, Jam, Rumore, Jazzit, Il Giornale della Musica, Carnet, Amadeus, Playboy, Cuadernos de Jazz).

His activity also includes extensive studies, research and essays on contemporary Brazilian music (Música popular brasileira), its social implications and its leading role in the collective imagination as a paradigm of the so-called "World" sound. He co-authored the "Encyclopedia of Rock", recently re-published by Arcana Editrice, and during the 90's he actively collaborated as a consultant both for Blue Note artists the Doky Brothers and pianist Niels Lan Doky, for whom he wrote the liner notes for the album "Haitek Haiku", produced by Gino Vannelli. In 1998 he published a book of essays and conversations with Japanese composer Ryuichi Sakamoto ("Ryuichi Sakamoto. Conversazioni"), featuring a foreword by Banana Yoshimoto.

A year later he contributed with a semiological essay ("Transiti/Transits") to the catalog for the exhibition "Musica Senza Suono" ("Soundless Music"), conceived and realized by producer Francesco Messina and critic Enzo Gentile for the Museo Revoltella in Trieste (Italy).

In 2003/2004 he settled in Tokyo to conduct researches for the Japan Foundation in collaboration with Kyoto University, under the supervision of philosopher Akira Asada, on the theme of the 'reversed exoticism' in modern Japan'.

Since 2015, Milano hosts The Tinseltown Tracks, a weekly radio show aired on Radio Flash 97.6, that has produced tenths of monographic broadcasts and boasts an audience that spans several countries around the world.

His upcoming projects include a short essay about the perception of Western pop culture in the Far East; a book about Alejandro Jodorowsky and his influence on the psychedelic movement, the neo-mysticism and the counterculture of the 1960s; and a self-produced DVD about Japan for which he's currently writing the music and the screenplay.
