= Kei Tani =

Japanese comedian, actor, and musician (1932–2010)

- Born: Yasuo Watanabe; February 22, 1932
- Died: September 11, 2010 (aged 78)

Kei Tani (谷啓, Tani Kei) (born Yasuo Watanabe (渡部 泰雄, Watanabe Yasuo); 22 February 1932 – 11 September 2010) was a Japanese comedian, actor and musician. Born in Tokyo, he learned to play the trombone and, while a student at Chuo University, began playing in jazz bands performing for American soldiers during the Occupation of Japan. He quit university and joined the City Slickers with Frankie Sakai in 1953. In 1956, he joined the comic-jazz band The Crazy Cats with Hajime Hana and Hitoshi Ueki. He came to fame when the Crazy Cats started appearing on television, especially through their variety show "Shabondama Holiday," and in movies, through comedy series such as the "Irresponsible" (Musekinin) series at Toho. Some of his nonsense one-word gags, such as "gachon" became buzzwords imitated throughout the nation. He also appeared alone in dramatic roles on film and television, was a regular in the "Tsuribaka Nisshi" film series, and continued to be a popular figure on variety TV.

His real name was Yasuo Watanabe, but his stage name, especially with the Japanese name order "Tani Kei," was based on a pun on the name Danny Kaye.

He died of a brain contusion on 11 September 2010 after falling down the stairs in his Mitaka home.

== Selected filmography ==
- Nippon musekinin jidai (ニッポン無責任時代) (1962)
- Young Season (若い季節) (1962)
- Zūzūshii yatsu (図々しい奴) (1965)
- Fancy Paradise (1968)
- Kofuku (1981)
- Tokyo Heaven (1990)
- Samurai Fiction (1998)
- After Life (1998)
- Waterboys (2001)
- Swing Girls (2004)
- Blooming Again (2004)
- Chameleon (2008)

== Selected television roles ==
- Monkey (1979) as Daode Tianzun
- Dokuganryū Masamune (1987) as Imai Sōkun
