= Nae Yūki =

Japanese actress and singer (born 1970)

Nae Yūki (裕木 奈江, Yūki Nae; born 1970) is a Japanese actress, singer and ex-idol. (Note: She herself has chosen to spell her name in the Latin alphabet with Nae Yuuki.) She worked in Japan in the 1990s before moving to the United States in the 2000s.

== Early career ==
Yuuki was born in Kanagawa Prefecture in 1970. Raised by her grandmother, she was taught to be independent and not rely on men. She made her debut in showbiz with a minor role in a 1988 film. She gained immense popularity in the early 1990s through her appearances in television dramas, television commercials and radio. For about a year from 1992, she hosted two hours of the late-night Nippon Broadcasting System's radio program All Night Nippon. In the 1990s, she was active as a so-called "idol" and produced eight albums containing idol songs.

In 1992, Yuuki played one of the main characters in one episode of the long-running television drama series From the Northern Country (Kita no Kuni kara). In 1993, she played the lead role in the NTV TV drama series Pocket Bell Doesn't Ring (Pokeberu ga Naranakute). Some say that her popularity has increased by appearing in these dramas, but in reality she has also received a lot of emotional criticism. She was the victim of childish bashing from writers for women's magazines. NHK's profile of her merely states that these two works have "attracted great attention" to her. The "pocket bell" (pager device) which was used in the latter drama was also a device that attracted a great deal of attention in Japanese society at the time. The latter drama depicted the process by which a middle-aged businessman begins to "repurpose" a pager, originally intended for business use, for social purposes, guided by a young woman played by Nae Yuuki.

== Moving to Hollywood ==
In the late 1990s, it came to be said that Yuuki had "disappeared from Japanese television." In 2001, she played one of the main roles in the film Rain of Light directed by Banmei Takahashi. Rain of Light is a film that depicts the real-life incident of the United Red Army Incident of 1972 through a film within a film. The role Yuuki played was that of an actress who played a character based on a revolutionary Hiroko Nagata who killed many of her comrades.

In 2004, Yuuki studied abroad in Greece as part of a training program run by the Agency for Cultural Affairs. Taking an starting point by this, in 2005 she moved her base of operations to Los Angeles, USA. She has appeared in films such as David Lynch's Inland Empire and Clint Eastwood's Letters from Iwo Jima. In 2017, she appeared in another Lynch's work: the television limited event series Twin Peaks: The Return, which is set 25 years after the hit original Twin Peaks (1990–91). Yuuki plays Naido, who first appears in episode 3. This character's eyes are covered with special makeup. Because special makeup was required, she had to arrive on set earlier than the other actors. A fan of Twin Peaks, she had wanted to meet Agent Cooper, but was never able to do so because she was blinded by special makeup. When she saw Kyle MacLachlan for the first time without the makeup, he was in his role as Bad Cooper.
