= Tokugawa Buraichō =

- Genre: Jidaigeki
- Directed by: Yasuhiko Ikawa etc
- Starring: Sonny Chiba; Hideki Saijo; Hajime Hana
- Narrated by: Kiyoshi Kobayashi
- Theme music composer: Noriyuki Asakura
- Country of origin: Japan
- Original language: Japanese
- No. of episodes: 24

Production
- Running time: 46 minutes (per episode)
- Production companies: TV Tokyo; Nikko Edo Mura

Original release
- Network: TV Tokyo
- Release: April 14 – September 29, 1992

Tokugawa Buraichō (徳川無頼帳) is a Japanese jidaigeki or period drama, that was broadcast in 1992.

== Plot ==
Matsudaira Tadateru the sixth son of Tokugawa Ieyasu was exiled from Tokugawa shogunate and he secretly lives in Yoshiwara in Edo. One day he accidentally meet Yagyū Jūbei. They start living in Yoshiwara's "Hanabusarō" and fight against the shogunate's huge conspiracy while guarding Yoshiwara.

== Cast ==
- Sonny Chiba as Matsudaira Tadateru
- Hideki Saijō as Yagyū Jūbei Mitsuyoshi
- Hajime Hana as Kyoya Shozaemon
- Taro Shigaki as Tokugawa Iemitsu
- Shōji Ishibashi as Saheiji
- Kumiko Takahashi as Chiyono Dayu
- Shōji Nakayama as Matsudaira Nobutsuna
