= Numb (2025 film) =

2025 Japanese drama film

- Theatrical poster

Japanese name
- Kanji: しびれ
Transcriptions
- Romanization: Shibire
- Directed by: Takuya Uchiyama
- Screenplay by: Takuya Uchiyama
- Produced by: Takuro Nagai; Yasushi Miyamae; Shintaro Hori; Mao Osaki; Naomi Satoh
- Starring: Takumi Kitamura; Rie Miyazawa; Masatoshi Nagase
- Cinematography: Hyogo Mitsuoka
- Edited by: Kenichi Hirai
- Production companies: RIKI PROJECT; ColorBird
- Distributed by: ColorBird
- Release dates: November 2025 (Tokyo); 25 September 2026 (Japan)
- Running time: 118 minutes
- Country: Japan
- Languages: Japanese; Russian

Numb (Japanese: しびれ, Hepburn: Shibire) is a 2025 Japanese drama film directed by Takuya Uchiyama. It follows the childhood and life of Daichi (Takumi Kitamura), a mute man, and his mother Aki (Rie Miyazawa), as they navigate abuse and the hardships of life.

== Plot ==
In Niigata, a boy named Daichi and his mother, Aki, are subject to extreme physical abuse from Daichi's father. By the time Daichi is 11, they have escaped and end up living in a roof shed in abject poverty — Aki has become a sex worker to earn money, and has developed alcoholism, while Daichi, now mute as a result of his trauma, resorts to stealing the most basic groceries and collecting water from the river. One day, while running away in town, he chances upon Ivan, an illegal Russian migrant worker from Vladivostok who offers to be his friend and gives him a ride home. He continues to run into trouble, as the homeowner whom he steals his groceries from catches him — though sympathetic and giving him food, she makes him promise not to come again. He runs to an underground Russian club, where he is caught by the owner, who chases him out. Returning, he finds that his home has caught on fire.

As a 15-year-old, Daichi and Aki have relocated to the apartment of his aunt, Tomoko, a devout Jehovah's Witness. Aki now suffers from cirrhosis, but is not giving up drinking as she believes the disease has gone too far. She pays money to her boyfriend, who resembles Daichi's father and gives her alcohol. Coming back one day, Daichi finds that Aki has signed a do not resuscitate form with Tomoko's approval — he confronts his aunt but she brushes him off. Later, he wakes up to find Aki's boyfriend attempting to drown her and abusing her much like Daichi's father. Unable to do anything, Daichi attempts to drown himself in the sea, but is saved by Ivan, who recognizes him and tells him that his life should not be dominated by sadness and his childhood trauma.

Ten years later, Daichi works as a bartender while also dealing drugs on the side to earn money for his mother. Upon a visit to her in the hospital, she apologizes, tells him that she does not need his money since she has been a bad parent and because she is receiving money from Daichi's father, who is still alive and had heard about her situation. Using the address provided on his father's envelope, Daichi grabs a kitchen knife and decides to exact revenge on him — he finds him in a run-down house, where he attempts to apologize. Daichi confronts him but accidentally stabs himself, and is left outside on the road in shock.

At Aki's funeral, Daichi places a can of her favorite beer in her casket. Greeting the attendees of the funeral, he sees his father, who bows to him — after some hesitation, Daichi bows back. After the funeral, Daichi loads Aki's ashes into his car and drives towards Tokyo, finally saying his first words since he became mute — "I'm going."

== Cast ==
- Takumi Kitamura as Daichi
- Rie Miyazawa as Aki
- Masatoshi Nagase as Ohara, Daichi's father
- Tsukasa Enomoto as Daichi (15)
- Anji Kato as Daichi (11)
- Haruto Akimoto as Daichi (7)
- Mariko Akama as Tomoko
- Eita Okuno as Yoshito, Aki's boyfriend
- Roman Murasenko as Ivan
- Masaaki Akahori as Construction Site Boss

== Production ==
The film is semi-autobiographical and is based on director Takuya Uchiyama's own experiences growing up in Niigata — as a child, Uchiyama also became mute before elementary school, but regained the ability to speak later on. As a guide for the film, Uchiyama "wanted to show how patients feel if they cannot bring themselves to enter schools or hospitals where they could expect treatment", and that he "aimed to shed light on the poverty in the hearts of people of all classes and celebrate that". He started writing the screenplay, which took ten years to finish, at 20 years of age. The film was shot in Niigata. Regarding the title, Uchiyama said that he "wanted to convey an emotion similar to pain, instead of sorrow". The film uses a handheld camera with no narration and no music. In casting Miyazawa, Uchiyama stated that he wanted an actor with the same intensity as Gena Rowlands in the films of John Cassavetes.

== Release ==
At the 26th Tokyo Filmex International Film Festival in November 2025, the film received the second-place Special Jury Prize. The film was screened at the 76th Berlin International Film Festival in February 2026 as part of the Panorama section. It also showed at the Jeonju International Film Festival in May 2026, receiving the NETPAC Award. It was screened at the Taipei Film Festival in June 2026 as a part of the section "Filmmakers in Focus". It was released theatrically in Japan on 25 September 2026.

== Critical reception ==
Mark Schilling, writing for The Japan Times, gave the film a three out of five stars, calling it "unsparing and uncompromising to a fault", with a "bleak vision of an uncaring society" that he remarks as contrasting with "typically Japanese" drama films that is "hard to watch". He praised Kitamura's performance as showing "a generational talent of wide and adventurous range", while calling Miyazawa "unrecognizable". At the Tokyo Filmex International Film Festival, juror Matías Piñeiro praised the film was "rough-hewn but compelling".
