= Dead-End Memories =

2006 short story collection by Banana Yoshimoto

- Author: Banana Yoshimoto
- Language: Japanese
- Genre: Literary fiction
- Publisher: Bungeishunjū (Japanese) Counterpoint (English)
- Publication date: July 7, 2006 (Japanese) August 9, 2022 (English)
- Publication place: Japan
- Pages: 245 (Japanese); 240 (English)
- ISBN: 978-4167667023
- Preceded by: ハゴロモ (Hagoromo)
- Followed by: なんくるない (It's Not Bad)

Dead-End Memories (デッドエンドの思い出, Deddoendo no omoide; lit. Memories of the Dead End) is a 2006 short story collection by Banana Yoshimoto, published by Bungeishunjū. In 2019, an English translation by Asa Yoneda was published by Counterpoint in 2022, and a movie adaptation, directed by Hyun-Young Choi, was released in Japan.

== Contents ==
In the book's afterword, Yoshimoto notes that the short stories were written out of her desire to tackle difficult topics, namely pain and heartbreak, which she didn't customarily write about in previous books. The book includes five stories, each of which follow a different woman protagonist. One of the stories, "Tomo-chan's Happiness", was originally published in 2003 in SWITCH, a magazine by Switch Publishing.

== Critical reception ==
Kirkus Reviews called the book "perfect for readers looking for stories that will leave a sweet taste in their mouths without sacrificing depth or intelligence" while lauding Yoshimoto's prose rendered by Yoneda. In a starred review, Publishers Weekly called the collection "resonant" and "a gem", lauding how Yoshimoto made her short stories "memorable by showing how the women set themselves free from misfortune via friendship and resilience."

The New York Times wrote "This is a supremely hopeful book, one that feels important because it shows that happiness, while not always easy, is still a subject worthy of art." The Japan Times called the book the equivalent of a "lo-fi playlist". The Spectator called Yoshimoto "the supreme poet of solitude" but also lauded her ability to write "the epiphanies, and cake, and chicken with rice, but most of all the tiny kindnesses from other human beings that make life worth persevering with." The Asian Review of Books observed Yoshimoto at her purest, with her typical shoujo elements, but also at her maturest.

== Film adaptation ==
In 2019, a movie adaptation for the book by the same title, albeit romanized as Memories of a Dead End, was released in Japan. Based on the short story "Dead-End Memories", the movie follows a woman, Yumi, who traveled from South Korea to Nagoya, Japan to see her long-distance fiancé, only to witness his act of infidelity. Afterward, she wanders around the city of Nagoya and stumbles upon a guesthouse where she meets its owner, Nishiyama.

The film was directed by Hyun-Young Choi. A joint production between movie theater Cinema Skhole and film studio Zoa Films, the film starred Soo-young Choi from Girls' Generation as Yumi and Shunsuke Tanaka as Nishiyama. Filming happened in Nagoya and Nagakute in 2018, and the production was crowdfunded on a Japanese fundraising platform called CAMPFIRE. It was later screened at the Aichi International Women's Film Festival and Busan International Film Festival.
