= Komori Seikatsu Kōjō Club =

Komori Seikatsu Kōjō Club (小森生活向上クラブ; "Komori's Life Improvement Club") is a 2008 Japanese film, based on the 2004 novel Komori Kachō no Yūga na Hibi (小森課長の優雅な日々), written by Hikaru Murozumi. The film, directed by Ikki Katashima, stars Arata Furuta, Chiaki Kuriyama, Kosuke Toyohara, Shiro Sano, Narimi Arimori, and Shugo Oshinari.

== Plot ==
Komori is an ordinary, middle-aged business executive tired of being walked over by others. Neither his family nor his coworkers have any respect for him. One fateful day, while riding the train, a woman falsely accuses him of groping her, causing Komori to have his first violent outburst. Following this incident, he decides to take justice into his own hands and aims to rid his community of crime. Soon afterwards, people begin to idolize him and his work.

== Cast ==
- Arata Furuta as Komori
- Chiaki Kuriyama as Shizue
