= Kita no Kuni kara =

Japanese television series

Kita no Kuni kara (北の国から, From the Northern Country) is a Japanese TV drama series that aired on Fuji Television from 1981 to 2002. After an initial full season of 24 episodes that ran from 9 October 1981 to 26 March 1982, it was followed by eight further special episodes. Sō Kuramoto wrote its screenplay.

== Premise ==
Goro Kuroita and his children Jun and Hotaru move from Tokyo to the town of Furano in Hokkaido after a divorce to start a new life. The family moves to Goro's childhood home, in a desolate location.

== Cast ==
- Kunie Tanaka as Goro Kuroita
- Hidetaka Yoshioka as Jun Kuroita
- Tomoko Nakajima as Hotaru Kuroita
- Ayumi Ishida as Reiko Kuroita
- Keiko Takeshita as Yukiko Miyamae
- Mieko Harada as Ryoko Kitani
- Koichi Iwaki as Sota Kitamura
- Miyuki Matsuda as Tsurara Yoshimoto
- Takeo Chii as Kazuo Nakahata
- Hideji Ōtaki as Seikichi Kitamura
- Ryūtarō Ōtomo as Kineji Kasamatsu

Actors who joined in the later specials

- Megumi Yokoyama as Rei Osato (1987, 1989, 1992, 1995)
- Nae Yūki as Tamako Matsuda (1992)
- Rie Miyazawa as Shu Konuma (1995, 1998, 2002)
- Yuki Uchida as Yui Takamura (2002)
- Naoto Ogata as Yuji Wakui (1989, 1992, 1995)
- Chishū Ryū as Matsukichi Sawada (1983)
- Bunta Sugawara as Tamako's uncle (1992)

== Production ==
Kuramoto moved from Tokyo to Furano in 1977 and his experience there influenced the series. At the time, Furano was desolate and had nothing.

Fuji Television provided assistance from Hokkaido Cultural Broadcasting, its local affiliate.

Fuji TV presented a deficit of several million yen, but earned profits worth over 2 billion yen from video sales and other sources. After the initial 24 episodes, Fuji TV produced and aired eight irregular specials from 1983 to 2002.

== TV schedule ==
Episode	Title	Directed by	Original airdate	Rating
1	"Haioku" (廃屋)	Takuji Tominaga	October 9, 1981	16.4%
2	"Tegami" (手紙)	Takuji Tominaga	October 16, 1981	11.2%
3	"Ketsui" (決意)	Takuji Tominaga	October 23, 1981	9.3%
4	"Onna-Bengoshi" (女弁護士)	Shigemichi Sugita	October 30, 1981	11.1%
5	"Kitsune" (キツネ)	Shigemichi Sugita	November 6, 1981	10.3%
6	"Muffler" (マフラー)	Yoshiaki Yamada	November 13, 1981	13.5%
7	"Denwa" (電話)	Takuji Tominaga	November 20, 1981	13.2%
8	"Suido" (水道)	Yoshiaki Yamada	November 27, 1981	14.3%
9	"Raiho" (来訪)	Takuji Tominaga	December 4, 1981	13.5%
10	"Kiseki" (奇跡)	Shigemichi Sugita	December 11, 1981	16.0%
11	"Iede" (家出)	Shigemichi Sugita	December 18, 1981	13.8%
12	"Wana" (罠)	Takuji Tominaga	December 25, 1981	13.2%
13	"Kikyo" (帰京)	Takuji Tominaga	January 8, 1982	13.5%
14	UFO	Shigemichi Sugita	January 15, 1982	13.2%
15	"Jiken" (事件)	Yoshiaki Yamada	January 22, 1982	15.1%
16	"Tenko" (転校)	Takuji Tominaga	January 28, 1982	14.4%
17	"Betsuri" (別離)	Takuji Tominaga	February 5, 1982	18.6%
18	"Ikada-Kudari" (イカダ下り)	Takuji Tominaga	February 12, 1982	16.2%
19	"Kokai" (後悔)	Shigemichi Sugita	February 19, 1982	17.0%
20	"Tenkin" (転勤)	Shigemichi Sugita	February 26, 1982	17.5%
21	"Saikai" (再会)	Yoshiaki Yamada	March 5, 1982	15.7%
22	"Tanjobi" (誕生日)	Shigemichi Sugita	March 12, 1982	17.8%
23	"Yabureta Kutsu" (破れた靴)	Yoshiaki Yamada	March 19, 1982	19.6%
24	"Maruta-Goya" (丸太小屋)	Takuji Tominaga	March 26, 1982	21.0%
Average rating 14.8% - Rating is based on Japanese Video Research (Kantō region).

=== Specials ===
Episode	Title	Directed by	Original airdate	Rating
1	"Kita no Kuni kara 1983: Winter" (北の国から'83冬)	Shigemichi Sugita	March 24, 1983	26.4%
2	"Kita no Kuni kara 1984: Summer" (北の国から'84夏)	Shigemichi Sugita	September 27, 1984	24.3%
3	"Kita no Kuni kara 1987: First Love" (北の国から'87初恋)	Shigemichi Sugita	March 27, 1987	20.5%
4	"Kita no Kuni kara 1989: Homecoming" (北の国から'89帰郷)	Shigemichi Sugita	March 31, 1989	33.3%
5	"Kita no Kuni kara 1992: Leaving the Nest – Part 1 (北の国から'92巣立ち 前編)	Shigemichi Sugita	May 22, 1992	32.2%
5	"Kita no Kuni kara 1992: Leaving the Nest – Part 2" (北の国から'92巣立ち 前編)	Shigemichi Sugita	May 23, 1992	31.7%
6	"Kita no Kuni kara 1995: Secret" (北の国から'95秘密)	Shigemichi Sugita	June 9, 1995	30.8%
7	"Kita no Kuni kara 1998: The Era – Part 1" (北の国から'98時代 前編)	Shigemichi Sugita	July 10, 1998	25.9%
7	"Kita no Kuni kara 1998: The Era – Part 2" (北の国から'98時代 後編)	Shigemichi Sugita	July 11, 1998	24.8%
8	"Kita no Kuni kara 2002: Last Will – Part 1" (北の国から 2002遺言 前編)	Shigemichi Sugita	September 6, 2002	38.4%
8	"Kita no Kuni kara 2002: Last Will – Part 2" (北の国から 2002遺言 後編)	Shigemichi Sugita	September 7, 2002	33.6%

== Legacy ==
Long after the end of the drama, some of its filming shots remain as they were, this time as tourist attractions.
