= Narimi Arimori =

Japanese actress

- Born: 10 December 1967 (age 58); Yokohama, Kanagawa, Japan
- Occupation: Actress
- Years active: 1984–present

Narimi Arimori (有森 也実 Arimori Narimi, born 10 December 1967 in Yokohama, Japan) is a Japanese actress.

== Filmography ==
=== Film ===
- Hoshizora no Mukō no Kuni (1986), Risa
- Final Take (1986), Koharu Tanaka
- Tora-san's Bluebird Fantasy (1986), A Tourist
- Komori Seikatsu Kojo Club (2008), Taeko Komori
- Inumukoiri (2017), Azusa Ninomiya
- The Land Beyond the Starry Sky (2021), Risa's mother
- The Flower in the Sky (2022)
- Goldfish (2023)
- Single 8 (2023), Hiroshi's mother
- Knuckle Girl (2023)
- Dare to Stop Us 2 (2024)
- Paradise of Solitude (2024)
- Nagasaki: In the Shadow of the Flash (2025)
- Sōzoku (2025), Satomi Tanaka
- Period (2026)

=== Television ===
- Tokyo Love Story (1991), Satomi Sekiguchi
- Hideyoshi (1996), Tsumaki Hiroko
- Minami-kun no Koibito (2015)

== Awards and nominations ==
| Year | Award | Category | Title | Result | Ref. |
|---|---|---|---|---|---|
| 1987 | 29th Blue Ribbon Awards | Best Newcomer | Final Take | Won | |
| 1987 | 10th Japan Academy Prize | Newcomers of the Year | Final Take | Won | |
