= Amrita (Yoshimoto novel) =

1994 novel by Banana Yoshimoto

- Amrita
- Author: Banana Yoshimoto
- Translator: Russell F. Wasden
- Publisher: Grove Press
- Publication date: 1994
- English publication date: 1997
- Media type: Hardcover
- Pages: 366
- ISBN: 0-8021-1590-X
- OCLC: 36528204
- Dewey Decimal: 895.6/35 21
- LC Class: PL865.O7138 A4813 1994
- Preceded by: English: Lizard (novel)
- Followed by: English: Asleep (novel)

Amrita (アムリタ) is a novel written in 1994 by the Japanese author Banana Yoshimoto (吉本ばなな) and translated into English in 1997 by Russell F. Wasden.

== Plot synopsis ==
The main character, Sakumi, loses her beautiful younger sister, an actress, to suicide. Sakumi subsequently falls down a flight of stairs, losing her memory. She struggles to regain her memory with the assistance of her sister's lover and a clairvoyant younger brother.

== Awards ==
- 5th Murasaki Shikibu Prize – November 1995
- Scanno (Italy) – June 1993
- Fendissime (Italy) – March 1996
- Maschera d'Argento (Italy)– November 1999

== Publishing information ==
Amrita (English edition) by Banana Yoshimoto

- Hardcover - ISBN 0-8021-1590-X published by Grove Press, 1997
- Paperback - ISBN 0-671-53285-5, published by Washington Square Press, 1998
