= Final Take =

1986 film by Yōji Yamada

- Film poster
- Directed by: Yoji Yamada
- Written by: Yoji Yamada; Yoshitaka Asama; Hisashi Inoue; Taichi Yamada
- Produced by: Yoshitarō Nomura
- Starring: Kiyoshi Atsumi; Kiichi Nakai; Narimi Arimori
- Cinematography: Tetsuo Takaha
- Edited by: Iwao Ishii
- Music by: Naozumi Yamamoto
- Release date: 2 August 1986 (Japan)
- Running time: 135 minutes
- Country: Japan
- Language: Japanese

Final Take (Japanese: キネマの天地, Hepburn: Kinema no Tenchi), also known as Final Take: The Golden Age of Movies, is a 1986 Japanese drama film directed by Yoji Yamada. It was Japan's submission to the 59th Academy Awards for the Academy Award for Best Foreign Language Film, but was not accepted as a nominee.

== Cast ==
- Kiyoshi Atsumi as Kihachi
- Kiichi Nakai as Kenjiro Shimada
- Narimi Arimori as Koharu Tanaka (inspired by Kinuyo Tanaka)
- Keiko Matsuzaka as Sumie Kawashima (inspired by Yoshiko Okada)
- Ittoku Kishibe as Ogata (inspired by Yasujirō Ozu)
- Chishū Ryū as Tomo-san
- Hajime Hana
- Kaori Momoi
- Nana Kinomi
- Senri Sakurai
- Akira Emoto
- Masaaki Sakai (inspired by Torajirō Saitō)
- Mitsuru Hirata
- Gin Maeda
- Hidetaka Yoshioka as Mitsuo
- Chieko Baisho
- Matsumoto Kōshirō VIII (special appearance) as Shirota (inspired by Shirō Kido)
- Kanbi Fujiyama (special appearance)

== See also ==
- Cinema of Japan
- List of submissions to the 59th Academy Awards for Best Foreign Language Film
- List of Japanese submissions for the Academy Award for Best Foreign Language Film
