= Rie Miyazawa =

Japanese musical artist (born 1973)

- 宮沢 りえ
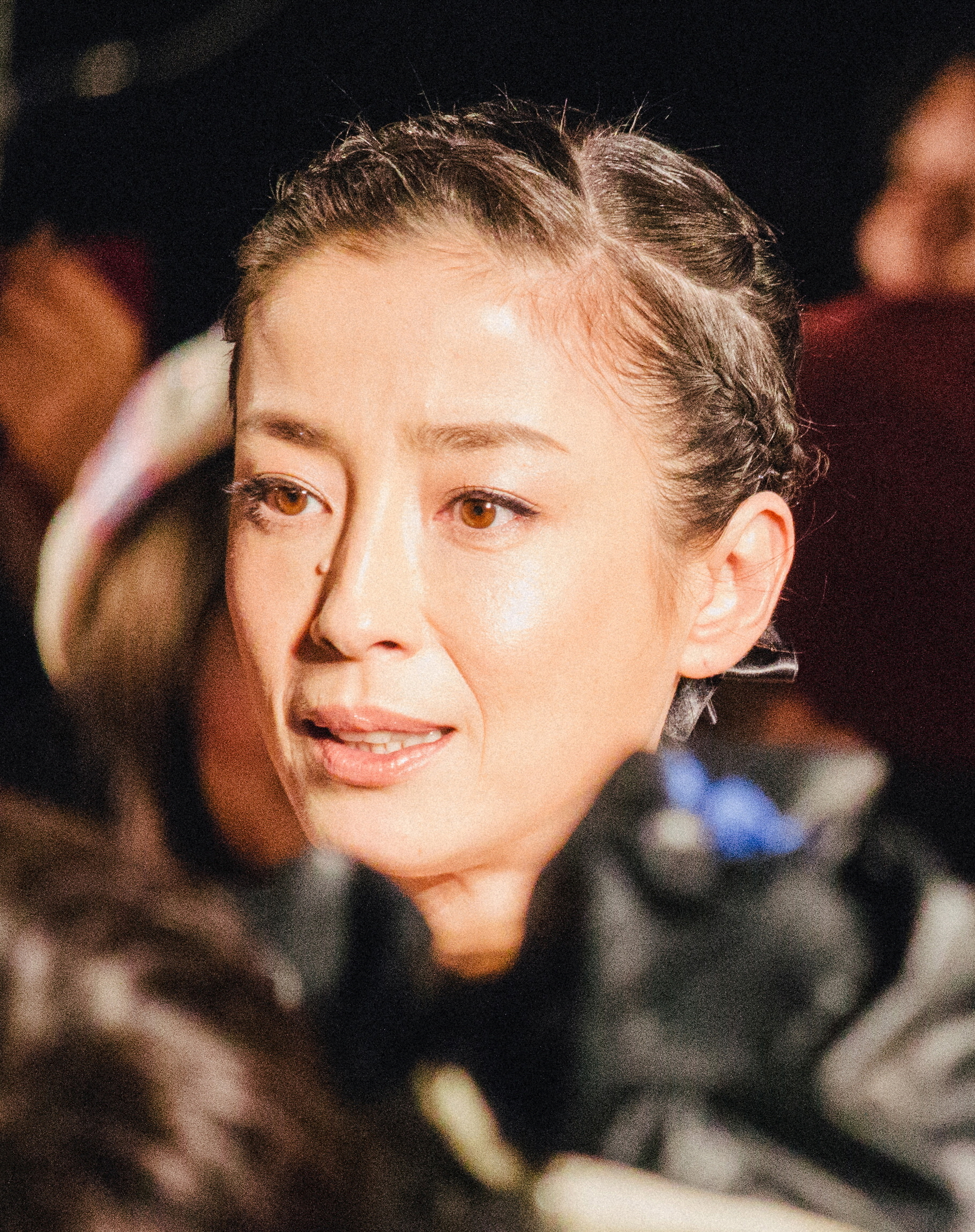
- Miyazawa in 2014
- Born: April 6, 1973 (age 53); Tokyo, Japan
- Occupations: Actress, singer
- Years active: 1985–present
- Spouses: Hiroyuki Nakatsu (m. 2009; div. 2016); Go Morita (m. 2018)
- Children: 1
- Musical career
- Genre: J-pop
- Instrument: Vocals
- Label: CBS/Sony Records

Japanese name
- Kanji: 宮沢 りえ
- Hiragana: みやざわ りえ
Transcriptions
- Romanization: Miyazawa Rie

Rie Miyazawa (宮沢 りえ, Miyazawa Rie; born April 6, 1973) is a Japanese actress and former idol singer. She is regarded as one of Japan's top actresses, and her accolades include six Japan Academy Film Prizes and three Kinema Junpo Awards.

Miyazawa began her career as a child model, seeing wide exposure as the original face of Mitsui Rehouse. At age 16, she made her acting debut in the 1988 film Seven Day's War, winning the Japan Academy Award for Newcomer of the Year. Her short-lived music career began with the single "Dream Rush" in 1989, and the next year she performed at the prestigious Kōhaku Uta Gassen television special.

Miyazawa quickly rose to prominence as one of the top idols of the early Heisei period, attracting controversy for her 1991 nude photography book Santa Fe, which sold 1.5 million copies. Her personal struggles were further scrutinized, including a high-profile engagement to sumo wrestler Takanohana, a suicide attempt and battle with anorexia nervosa. By 1996, she went into hiatus and briefly resettled in the United States.

She took on a few television drama roles in the late 1990s, and returned to the big screen in the Taiwanese films The Cabbie (2000) and Peony Pavilion (2001). She co-starred in the highly-acclaimed 2002 film The Twilight Samurai, which marked a full-fledged comeback for Miyazawa and remains as her most recognizable role both domestically and internationally. She saw further success in The Face of Jizo and Tony Takitani (2004), and received several accolades for Pale Moon (2014) and Her Love Boils Bathwater (2016).

== Life and career ==
Miyazawa was born in Tokyo to a Dutch father and a Japanese mother Mitsuko Miyazawa. Since her debut at age 11 in an advertisement for Kit Kat, she has appeared many films, television shows, commercials, stage appearances and photo books to her credit. She starred in the children's comedy Bokura no Nanokakan Sensō (Seven Days' War) and the television drama Tokyo Elevator Girl. Miyazawa made her debut as a singer on September 15, 1989, with her album MU.

Miyazawa gained notoriety in 1991 with the publication of a fine art nude photography book, Santa Fe, and even more publicity in 1992 with her engagement to sumo star Takanohana. The engagement was called off in 1993. In September 1994 she cut her wrists with a broken glass in what she described as an "accident" and which some reports characterized as a suicide attempt. Miyazawa continued to pursue her career as an actress, including a performance in Kon Ichikawa's movie 47 Ronin that year. But the following February she pulled out of the drama Kura and in November backed out of the musical Kyote.

In early 1996 Miyazawa moved to Coastal California, but by May she was back on TV reporting from the Cannes Film Festival and later that year she appeared in two TV dramas: Hanayome Kaizoebito and Kyosokyoku. In 1997 she made Mikeneko Homes (tasogare) Hoteru and also appeared on stage.

In 2001, Miyazawa won the Best Actress Award at the 23rd Moscow International Film Festival by portraying a Chinese Kunqu performer in the Hong Kong film Peony Pavilion, directed by Yonfan. Then in 2002, she starred alongside Hiroyuki Sanada in Tasogare Seibei (The Twilight Samurai), the year's hit movie that won numerous awards at home, including ones for the lead actors, and was nominated for an Academy Award as Best Foreign Language Film. In 2003 she played the role of Oshino in the NHK TV series Musashi.

Tony Takitani (2004) — an adaptation of a short story by the bestselling author Haruki Murakami — received critical acclaim, with Miyazawa playing two roles alongside Issey Ogata. The film, which was entered at the Sundance Film Festival, has been described as "a perfectly controlled minimalist film masterpiece". In 2005, she starred as Tsubaki in Ashurajō no Hitomi (あしゅらじょう の ひとみ), which is a movie adaptation of a 16th-century play.

Most recently, Miyazawa received the 40th Japan Academy Prize for Best Actress for her performance in Her Love Boils Bathwater.

== Personal life ==
On February 13, 2009, Miyazawa announced to the public that she was six months pregnant and would soon marry the child's father, reported to be Hiroyuki Nakatsu, an ex-pro surfer from Hawaii turned entrepreneur. On May 20, 2009, in Tokyo she gave birth to a baby girl.

On March 23, 2016, Miyazawa announced that her divorce from Nakatsu has been finalized.

On March 16, 2018, she married Go Morita from the band V6.

== Filmography ==
=== Film ===
- Seven Days' War (1988), Hitomi Nakayama
- Who Do I Choose? (1989)
- Basara: The Princess Goh (1992)
- Erotic Liaisons (1992)
- Kin chan no Cinema Jack II : Light of Firefly (1994)
- 47 Ronin (1994)
- Tenshu monogatari (1995)
- The Cabbie (2000)
- Peony Pavilion (2001)
- Free and Easy 12: Big Holiday Bonus Project (2001)
- Utsutsu (2002)
- The Twilight Samurai (2002)
- The Face of Jizo (2004)
- Tony Takitani (2004)
- Ashurajō no Hitomi (2005)
- The Book of the Dead (2005), Lady (voice)
- Hana (2006)
- The Invitation from Cinema Orion (2007)
- Dreaming Awake (2008)
- Haha Shan no Komoriuta (2009)
- Gelatin Silver Love (2009)
- Kiki's Delivery Service (2014)
- Pale Moon (2014), Rika Umezawa
- Too Young to Die! (2016)
- Her Love Boils Bathwater (2016)
- No Longer Human (2019)
- Seven Days War (2019), Hitomi Nakayama (voice)
- Independence of Japan (2020), Masako Shirasu
- The Sunday Runoff (2022), Yumi Kawashima
- I Am Makimoto (2022), Miharu Imae
- The Moon (2023), Yoko Dojima
- Phoenix Reminiscence of Flower (2023), Romi (voice)
- The Last Man: The Movie – First Love (2025), Nagisa Ivanova
- Numb (2025), Aki

=== Television ===
- Kasuga no Tsubone (1989), young Ohatsu
- Taiheiki (1991), Fujiyasha
- Tokyo Elevator Girl (1992)
- Kita no Kuni kara: Himitsu (1995)
- Concerto (1996)
- Kita no Kuni kara: Jidai (1998)
- Genroku Ryōran (1999), Yōzen-in
- Kita no Kuni kara: Yuigon (2002)
- Gō (2011), Yodo-dono
- Gu-Gu Datte Neko de Aru (2014)
- Sherlock Holmes (2014 puppetry in which she voices Irene Adler)
- North Light (2020), Yukari Murakami
- The Naked Director Season 2 (2021), Ms. Takamiya
- The 13 Lords of the Shogun (2022), Lady Maki
- Phoenix: Eden17 (2023), Romi (voice)
- Asura (2025), Tsunako
- Human Specimens (2025), Rumi Ichinose
- Queen of Mars (2025), Takima Suzuki

=== Japanese dub ===
- The House with a Clock in Its Walls (2018), Florence Zimmerman

== Discography ==
=== Studio albums ===
Title	Details	Peak chart position	Sales
Title	Details	JPN	Sales
MU	Released: November 22, 1989; Label: CBS/Sony; Formats: CD	3	JPN: 133,000
Chepop	Released: October 21, 1990; Label: CBS/Sony; Formats: CD	8	JPN: 61,600
Rosee	Released: June 21, 1993; Label: Sony Music; Formats: CD	85	JPN: 3,750

=== Singles ===
Title	Year	Peak chart positions	Album
Title	Year	JPN	Album
"Dream Rush" (ドリーム ラッシュ, Dorīmu Rasshu)	1989	2	MU
"No Titlist"	1990	1	MU
"Game"	1990	5	Chepop
"Sweet X'mas Kiss"	1991	25	Non-album singles
"Kokoro Kara Suki" (心から好き, "I Love You From My Heart")	1992	21	Non-album singles
"Akai Hana" (赤い花, "Red Flower")	1993	31	Rosee
"Boyfriend" (ボーイフレンド, Bōifurendo)	1993	72	Rosee

== Stage ==
- Gypsy (1991)
- Kaijin Bessō (1994)
- Tenshu monogatari (1994, 1996)
- Furu-amerika ni Sode wa Nurasaji (1994)
- Tezuka's Ancestor Dr. Ryoan (1998)
- Rainbow Parakeet (2000)
- The Tale of Genji (2000)
- The Kiss of an Invisible Man (2004)
- Rope (2006–07)
- Dorakuru－God Fearing Dracul (2007)
- A Doll's House (2008)
- Piper (2009)
- The Character (2010)

== Awards ==
- A Doll's House
  - Yomiuri Theater Award—Best Actress
- Rope
  - The 41st Kinokuniya Stage Award—Individual Award
- Art Encouragement Prize for 2004—from Agency for Cultural Affairs
- The Face of Jizō
  - Blue Ribbon Award—Best Actress
  - Kinema Junpo Awards—Best Actress
  - Yamaji Fumiko Award—Best Actress
- The Kiss of an Invisible Man
  - Yomiuri Theater Award—Best Actress
- Twilight Samurai
  - Japan Academy Award—Best Actress
  - Blue Ribbon Award—Best Supporting Actress
  - Nikkan Sports Movie Award—Best Actress
  - Kinema Junpo Awards—Best Actress
  - Mainichi Film Concours—Best Supporting Actress
  - Hochi Film Award—Best Actress
- Utsutsu
  - Kinema Junpo Awards—Best Actress
  - Blue Ribbon Award—Best Supporting Actress
- Peony Pavilion
  - Moscow International Film Festival—Best Actress
- Seven Days' War
  - Japan Academy Award—Best New Actor
  - Nikkan Sports Movie Award—Best New Talent
- Who Do I Choose?
  - Nikkan Sports Film Award—Best New Talent
