= The Lake (Yoshimoto novel) =

2005 book by Banana Yoshimoto

The Lake (みずうみ, Mizuumi) is a 2005 novel by Banana Yoshimoto, translated into English by Michael Emmerich, and inspired by the infamous, real-life Aum Shinrikyo cult.

== Plot ==
After her mother's death, Chihiro moves to Tokyo, where she sees a mysterious man, Nakajima, standing in the window of his home opposite hers, and watching her. Nakajima seems to have been a victim of a childhood trauma. Chihiro begins to fall in love with him but his dark past threatens to tear them apart.

== Characters ==
- Chihiro : Born to unmarried parents. Her father is a businessman and her mother is the owner of a bar. She is a graphic artist.
- Nakajima : A mysterious man with a dark troubled past involved with the Lake.
- Mino : Nakajima's friend, brother to bed-ridden seer Chii. He acts as Chii's mouthpiece.
- Chii: a bed-ridden seer who is barely conscious; sister of Mino with whom she communicates telepathically.
