= Riho Makise =

Japanese actress (born 1971)

- 牧瀬 里穂
- Born: December 17, 1971 (age 54); Hakata, Fukuoka, Japan
- Years active: 1989 - present
- Spouse: Nigo (m. 2008)

Riho Makise (牧瀬 里穂, Makise Riho; born December 17, 1971) is a Japanese actress. She debuted at the Takeda Hi-C contest in 1989, which she won. She is represented by the Blooming Agency.

== Career ==
In the 1990s, Makise was called "3M" along with Rie Miyazawa and Alisa Mizuki due to her popularity.

== Filmography ==
=== Films ===
- Tokyo Heaven (1990)
- Tugumi (1990)
- Bakumatsu Junjoden (1991), Okita Soji
- Tōki Rakujitsu (1992)
- Yonshimai Monogatari (1995)
- Tora-san's Easy Advice (1995)
- Miyazawa Kenji Sonoai (1996)
- Dream Stadium (1997)
- Takkyu Onsen (1998)
- Face (2000)
- Chinchiromai (2000)
- Turn (2001), Maki Mori
- Our 30-Minute Sessions (2020), Shinobu Murase

=== TV series ===
- Hatachi no Yakusoku (1992)
- Saiyuki (1994), Tripitaka
- Shinkonnari (1995)
- Taiyo ga Ippai (1998)
- Hojo Tokimune (2001)
- Manpuku (2018), Shinobu Kawakami
- Ranman (2023), Matsu Nishimura
