= Tony Takitani =

- Film poster
- Directed by: Jun Ichikawa
- Written by: Haruki Murakami (short story); Jun Ichikawa
- Produced by: Motoki Ishida
- Starring: Issey Ogata; Rie Miyazawa
- Music by: Ryuichi Sakamoto
- Distributed by: Strand Releasing; Axiom Films (UK and Ireland)
- Release dates: August 11, 2004 (Locarno Film Festival); January 29, 2005 (Japan)
- Running time: 75 minutes
- Country: Japan
- Language: Japanese

Tony Takitani (Japanese: トニー滝谷) is a 2004 Japanese drama film directed by Jun Ichikawa, based on the short story by Haruki Murakami.

== Inspiration ==
Haruki Murakami was intrigued by the name Tony Takitani when, at a thrift shop on Maui, he found a yellow T-shirt that said, "Tony Takitani, House (D)."

At the time, Takitani was running for office. Murakami decided to write the man's life story as this short story.

== Plot summary ==
Takitani Shozaburo, a jazz trombonist from Japan, spends the Second World War in China. Shozaburo is imprisoned and many of his fellow inmates are executed. He expects he will be executed, and he is shown curled up on the floor of his cell. However, he survives and in 1946 returns to Japan where he marries a distant relative on his mother's side. A year later they have a child, Tony, but Tony's mother dies three days after giving birth to him.

Shozaburo continues to travel and is away from home most of the time. Because of Tony's Americanised name, people often react oddly or sometimes with hostility to him. As such, he finds it natural to spend time alone. Tony develops an interest in drawing but prefers accuracy over emotion. As an adult he gets a job as a technical illustrator.

Tony falls in love with a young client, Eiko, who is obsessed with shopping for clothes. On their fifth date he proposes to her, but she says she has been seeing someone else for some time, and that she will think it over. Eventually Eiko accepts, and they are married.

Although Eiko and Tony are very happy together, they recognise that her shopping is becoming a problem: Eiko accumulates so many clothes and shoes that an entire room in the house is dedicated to them. Several days after acknowledging the issue, she decides to drive to her favourite boutique to return a coat and dress. After having returned the clothes, Eiko initially feels a sense of release, but whilst waiting at a traffic light, she begins to think about their colour, style, and texture. The light changes, and there is a crash in which Eiko is killed.

Tony is completely distraught and sets about hiring an assistant, Hisako, with the one condition that she should wear his wife's clothes to work. When Hisako sees Eiko's clothes, she begins to cry. Later that day Tony decides not to hire an assistant and sells the clothes instead.

Two years after his wife's death, Tony's father dies, leaving behind his trombone and his collection of jazz records. Tony keeps the trombone and the records in the room where Eiko used to keep her clothes. After a year Tony sells the records and the trombone. He also burns many of his paper belongings.

One evening at a gala event, a young man approaches Tony and introduces himself as the other man Eiko was seeing before she married Tony. He speaks disparagingly of Eiko. Tony rebukes him and leaves.

Tony lies on the floor of the now-empty room, mirroring the position of his father in the prison cell in China. He thinks about Hisako. Finally Tony calls Hisako but puts the phone down before she can answer.

== Cast ==
- Issey Ogata – Tony Takitani, Shozaburo Takitani
- Rie Miyazawa – Konuma Eiko, Hisako
- Takahumi Shinohara – Young Tony Takitani
- Hidetoshi Nishijima – Narrator (voice)

== Soundtrack ==
Tony Takitani

Soundtrack album by Ryuichi Sakamoto
- Released: 12 December 2007
- Recorded: Legacy Recording Studios, Studio A-509, New York
- Genre: Piano solo
- Label: Commmons
- Producers: Norika Sora, Evan Balmer

The soundtrack for the film was entirely composed by Ryuichi Sakamoto.

Track listing

1. "DNA - Intro" 11:37
2. "Solitude" 4:55
3. "DNA" 6:28
4. "Bottom" 0:40
5. "Fotografia #1" 3:33
6. "Fotografia #2" 3:42
7. "Solitude #2" 2:34
8. "Harmonics #1" 0:51
9. "Solitude - One Note" 3:25
10. "Harmonics #2" 1:02
11. "Solitude - Theme" 4:00

== Reception ==
On the review aggregator website Rotten Tomatoes, 88% of 58 critics' reviews are positive, with an average rating of 7.4/10. The website's consensus reads: "Despite its deceptive wispiness, this delicately lovely and melancholy film about loneliness has a haunting power." On Metacritic, it has a weighted average score of 80 out of 100 based on 22 critic reviews, indicating "generally favorable reviews".

The New York Times calls it, "A delicate wisp of a film with a surprisingly sharp sting".
