= Kaisha monogatari: Memories of You =

- Film poster
- Directed by: Jun Ichikawa
- Written by: Jun Ichikawa; Satoshi Suzuki
- Produced by: Toshiaki Nakazawa; Toshio Sakamoto
- Starring: Hajime Hana; Yumi Nishiyama; Hitoshi Ueki; Kei Tani; Hiroshi Inuzuka
- Cinematography: Susumu Ono
- Edited by: Riichi Tomitaku
- Music by: Bun Itakura
- Production companies: Shochiku; Nippon TV
- Distributed by: Shochiku
- Release date: November 26, 1988 (Japan)
- Running time: 99 minutes
- Country: Japan
- Language: Japanese

Kaisha monogatari: Memories of You (会社物語 Memories of You), also known as The Story of a Company, is a 1988 Japanese film co-written and directed by Jun Ichikawa.

== Plot ==
The movie follows Hajime Hanaoaka as he struggles with his impending retirement from his administrative job at Tokyo Co. Ltd. He plans to retire on his birthday, December 25, after 34 years of service to the company. The film opens with Hanaoaka boarding a train to work. He goes through the motions of his daily schedule, looking troubled and sad. Hanaoaka is realizing, now that he is about to retire, exactly how much of his life was dedicated to his work, and how much he will lose when he has to leave it. When his coworker asks Hanaoaka to write a reflection on his 34 years of work at Tokyo Co., Hanaoaka writes, "It wasn't just my job. It was my life.... I spoke more with my staff than with my own son." To cope with his sadness, Hanaoaka turns to jazz music. He had played the drums in his past, but hadn't done so in a very long time. When some of his coworkers reveal that they, too, can play instruments, a group of them decide to form the Tokyo Co. Swing Band. This puts Hanaoaka in much better spirits, and he and his fellow musicians spend a lot of time together rehearsing and discussing jazz up until their final performance at Hanaoaka's retirement party.

The film also focuses on Hanaoaka's young female coworker, played by Yumi Nishiyama. The audience sees her struggle with romance, becoming engaged to another office worker, but she breaks it off when he continues to see other women behind her back. She seems to connect with Hanaoaka, and the audience hears her voiceover at the beginning and end of the film. She says as the credits roll, "I'd watch him work, and my faith in people would be restored." At the beginning of the film, while Hanaoaka is acting very down, their other coworkers gossip about their lack of desire to throw Hanaoaka a retirement party. Hanaoka learns of this and sends out a newsletter to the office telling everyone to not worry about throwing a party, since he doesn't want to bother anyone. Nishiyama then sends Hanaoaka a private letter to invite him to a personal retirement party for just the two of them. They have dinner, and the two connect, though not romantically.

The film ends with Hanaoaka playing with his jazz band at his retirement party that ended up being planned for the sake of the jazz band's performance. His coworkers seem to be more friendly with him after the formation of the band.

== Use of music ==
Throughout the film, the scene is set using jazz music in the background. The film opens with Hanaoaka sitting melancholily in his living room in the early hours of the morning, apparently contemplating his retirement. Jazz music is playing, and it is slow and sedated, reflecting Hanaoaka's mood. He seems aware of the impending retirement, sad about it, but resigned to the fact. The music throughout the movie reflects his internal struggle. This shows how jazz music is what saves Hanaoaka, and is what he uses to express himself.

This also exhibits the growth of American culture within Japan. Jazz in Japan grew in popularity due to overseas trips to Japan by American jazz musicians. In the 1960s, Japanese counterculture was thriving, and jazz was often used as an expression of this. Hanaoaka was most likely a younger adult in the 1960s, and he could have been influenced by jazz at that time. Now, on the brink of retirement, his penchant for jazz in times of unrest is resurfacing.

== Historical context ==
The film subtly addresses class relationships in Japan. In 1988, when this film was published, it had been about 30 years since the beginning of the "Second Japanese Miracle" that boosted Japanese economy. "The Japanese economy has undergone a fundamental transformation during the 1950s and 1960s," and "by 1968 Japan's economy was not just the leader in East Asia but also the third largest in the world." The economic boom that began after the second World War "would amaze and alarm the world in the 1970s and 1980s," when this film was produced. This, combined with American influence, helped to dissolved the Japanese class system. "Between the 12th and 19th centuries, feudal Japan had an elaborate four tier class system." The film exhibits how modern Japan has progressed beyond social classes by including scenes in which there is mixing of these old classes. In one scene, a geisha and a construction worker are chatting in a hallway while businessmen move around them. Hanaoaka himself comments, "We salarymen are just villagers in ties." The film subverts class roles by showing that everyone is basically human, and by mixing different classes together in one business setting.

== Awards and nominations ==
31st Blue Ribbon Awards

- Won: Best Actor - Hajime Hana

43rd Mainichi Film Awards

- Nominated: Best Actor - Hajime Hana

12th Japan Academy Awards

- Nominated: Best Actor - Hajime Hana
