= Moonlight Shadow (novella) =

1986 Japanese book by Banana Yoshimoto

- Author: Banana Yoshimoto
- Original title: ムーンライト・シャドウ
- Language: Japanese
- Genre: Fiction
- Publisher: Asahi Press
- Publication date: 1986
- Publication place: Japan
- Media type: Print
- Awards: Izumi Kyōka Prize for Literature

"Moonlight Shadow" (ムーンライト・シャドウ, Mūnraito Shadō) is a novella by Japanese author Banana Yoshimoto, partly inspired by Mike Oldfield's song with the same title. The novella is included in most editions of Yoshimoto's novel Kitchen.

== Synopsis ==
The novella tells the story of a young woman, Satsuki, coming to terms with the death of her boyfriend, Hitoshi, in a car accident and her friendship with her boyfriend's brother, Hiiragi, whose girlfriend, Yumiko, also died in the same accident. With Japanese cultural and surrealistic themes, it is an example of Yoshimoto's clean writing style that portrays the emotions of grief, loss, and hope.

Many important symbols are brought up, including a bell. This bell is "what really sparked the relationship." Satsuki meets a mysterious woman who helps her overcome her boyfriend's death, and Satsuki continues wondering why the woman helped her after she overcomes Hitoshi's death.

== Awards and nominations ==
- 16th Izumi Kyōka Prize for Literature – January 1988

== Adaptations ==
In 2021, a movie adaptation starring Nana Komatsu and directed by Edmund Yeo was released.
