= Beautiful Star (novel) =

1962 Japanese novel by Yukio Mishima

- Author: Yukio Mishima
- Original title: 美しい星
- Translator: Stephen Dodd
- Genre: science fiction
- Publisher: Shinchosha (Japanese original), Penguin Random House (English translation)
- Publication date: 1962
- English publication date: 2022

Beautiful Star (Japanese: 美しい星, romanized: Utsukushii Hoshi) is a 1962 science fiction novel by Japanese author Yukio Mishima. The novel follows a family of extraterrestrials attempting to save humanity.

== Plot ==
The Ōsugi family of Hannō – Jūichirō, his wife Iyoko, and children Kazuo and Akiko — believe themselves to be ordinary, until each member witnesses a UFO flying by and recalls their existence on another planet. Together, they have made it their mission to save Earth, the "beautiful star", from annihilation. They write letters to Khrushchev, tour across Japan to speak about world peace and establish an organization, the Universal Friendship Association, which attracts attention from both other extraterrestrials on Earth and from the police, who suspect that the family is secretly communist. Among those extraterrestrials are Haguro, Kurita, and Sone, who seek the destruction of humanity, and Takemiya Kaoru, a Venusian who falls in love with Akiko.

Akiko falls pregnant, but claims that she was never sexually involved with Takemiya and that the conception is immaculate. Jūichirō goes to look for Takemiya, and learns that he is a conman and womanizer, and possibly not Venusian at all, but a simple human. In response to Akiko's question about what happened to Takemiya, he lies and tells her that Takemiya went back to Venus.

Kazuo, who has political ambitions, makes the acquaintance of Haguro and his friends, who are colleagues of the politician Kuroki. He reveals his father's origins in exchange for political power. The three find the Osugi home in order to speak with Juichiro. Haguro argues for the extermination of humankind; Jūichirō argues for the salvation of humankind.

Jūichirō, after the conversation, feels ill and goes to the hospital. Kazuo is informed that his father is dying of stomach cancer. He tells Akiko, but asks her not to tell their father. In a confrontation, Jūichirō confesses that he had lied to Akiko and Takemiya was just an earthling; in response, Akiko informs her father that he is dying from stomach cancer. He decides that it is their time to leave Earth; the novel ends with the family observing flying saucers together.

== Characters ==
- Jūichirō, the father. He is from Mars. He is mild-mannered and artistic.
- Iyoko, the mother. She is from Jupiter.
- Kazuo, the elder son. He is from Mercury.
- Akiko, the younger daughter. She is from Venus. She has an otherworldly beauty, which makes her vain and cold to that which she does not consider beautiful.
- Takemiya Kaoru, a young man who claims to be an extraterrestrial from Venus. He is quiet and reserved, and enjoys Noh chanting. He and Akiko observe flying saucers together, and fall in love.
- Haguro Masumi, an assistant professor at a university in Sendai. Like the Osugi family, he is an extraterrestrial, specifically from the 61 Cygni star system; unlike them, he seeks the destruction of humanity.
- Kurita, a bank clerk, also from the 61 Cygni star system.
- Sone, a barber, also from the 61 Cygni star system.
- Kuroki, a politician whom Kazuo admires

== Reception ==
Although Mishima believed that Beautiful Star was the best work of his career, the novel received a lukewarm reception in Japan. About 20 thousand copies were sold. Donald Keene rejected Mishima's request to translate it into English.

Bryan Karetnyk for the Financial Times praised the humour, pacing, and "scenes of intense beauty" of the novel and Dodd's translation; he commented "Mishima blends the sublime with the ridiculous in provocative and surprising ways". Lesley Downer for The Times Literary Supplement praised Mishima's humour, style and wit.

Alexander Lee of The Critic gave a mixed review, commenting that Beautiful Star seemed "little more than a stilted piece of science fiction...pretty humdrum stuff" and called the characters "tweedy" and the dialogue "leaden"; however, he called the novel "poignant" and praised Dodd's translation. Lisa Tuttle, writing for The Guardian, called the novel "strange and rather awkward".

== Adaptation ==
The novel was adapted into the 2017 film A Beautiful Star starring Lily Franky, Tomoko Nakajima, Kazuya Kamenashi, and Ai Hashimoto.
