= Goodbye Tsugumi =

1989 novel by Banana Yoshimoto

さよなら、つぐみ Goodbye Tsugumi
- First edition cover
- Author: Banana Yoshimoto
- Original title: さよなら、つぐみ
- Translator: Michael Emmerich
- Cover artist: Noboru Tsujitani
- Language: Japanese
- Genre: Literary Fiction
- Publisher: Chūōkōron Sha
- Publication date: March 25, 1989
- Publication place: Tokyo
- English publication date: 2002
- Media type: Print (Hardback)
- Pages: 237 pp
- ISBN: 978-4-12-001775-9
- OCLC: 20637893
- Dewey Decimal: 895.6/35 21
- LC Class: MLCSJ 89/01645 (P)
- Preceded by: Asleep (novel)
- Followed by: Hardboiled & Hard Luck (novel)

Goodbye Tsugumi (Japanese: TUGUMI; written in allcaps rōmaji) is a novel written by Japanese author Banana Yoshimoto in 1989 and translated into English in 2002 by Michael Emmerich.

Goodbye Tsugumi was made into a movie in 1990, directed by Jun Ichikawa.

== Plot ==
Tsugumi is a sickly but feisty and somewhat unpleasant young girl living in a small Japanese seaside town at the family inn with her parents, sister Yoko, aunt Masako, and cousin Maria (the protagonist). Following the divorce of Maria's father, Maria and Masako move to Tokyo to be with him, where Maria attends university. Shortly after the move, Maria receives a call from Tsugumi to say that the family are selling the inn. Maria returns to the town for one last summer to remember her childhood and reconcile her strained relationship with Tsugumi while she still can. But then they didn't realize the true display of true will.

== Awards ==
- 2nd Yamamoto Shūgorō Prize – March 1989

== Publication details ==
Goodbye Tsugumi (English edition) by Banana Yoshimoto

- Hardcover - ISBN 0-8021-1638-8 published by Grove Press
- Paperback - ISBN 0-8021-3991-4, published by Grove Press

A passage from this novel was published in the November 2009 SAT Reasoning Test.
