= Asleep (novel) =

1989 novel by Banana Yoshimoto

- First edition (Japanese)
- Author: Banana Yoshimoto
- Translator: Michael Emmerich
- Language: Japanese
- Publisher: Fukutake Shoten
- Publication date: 1989
- Publication place: Japan
- English publication date: 2001
- Media type: Print (Hardback)
- Pages: 211 pp
- ISBN: 4-8288-2306-9
- OCLC: 21159007
- Dewey Decimal: 895.6/35 21
- LC Class: PL865.O7138 S54 1989
- Preceded by: Amrita
- Followed by: Goodbye Tsugumi

Asleep (白河夜船 しらかわよぶね・しらかわよふね Shirakawa yofune or yobune) is a novel written by Japanese author Banana Yoshimoto (吉本ばなな)in 1989 and translated into English in 2000 (book was released in 2001) by Michael Emmerich.

== Description ==
The novel contains three stories. All three center around sleep, dreams, death, and at least two women who share the love of a single man.

=== Night & Night's Travelers ===
Shibami is a 22-year-old woman who shared a close relationship with both her brother and cousin. Her brother, Yoshihiro, who is charismatic and romantic, falls for an American woman named Sarah and moves to Boston. Meanwhile, her cousin, Mari, realises that she has always been in love with Yoshihiro. When Yoshihiro returns from America, he and Mari become lovers until his sudden death. The story is about the relationship between Mari and the narrator, and about how the death of a loved one, and the secrets they have left behind, can affect the people who were closest to them.

=== Love Songs ===
About a young woman named Fumi who is battling an addiction to alcohol. She hears strange music at night and remembers the face of Haru, a woman she lived with when they were both fighting over the affections of the same man. She slowly realizes that she loved this woman, and when she and her boyfriend realize that she has died, they seek a way to contact her from beyond the grave.

=== Asleep ===
Terako is a young woman who begins a relationship with a man whose wife is in a coma. After her best friend, Shiori, a kind of "sleep prostitute", commits suicide, the young woman is left feeling adrift in her own life, until she meets the spirit of her boyfriend's wife.

== Publication details ==
Asleep (English edition) by Banana Yoshimoto

- Hardcover - ISBN 0-8021-1669-8 published by Grove Press
- Paperback - ISBN 0-8021-3820-9, published by Grove Press

== Adaptations ==
In 2015, the third story was adapted for the big screen by Shingo Wakagi.
