= Siegfried Schaarschmidt =

German translator (1925–1998)

Personal details
- Born: 21 August 1925 Limbach-Oberfrohna, Germany
- Died: August 17, 1998 (aged 72) Germany
- Occupation: Translator

Siegfried Schaarschmidt (21 August 1925 – 17 August 1998) was a German translator, poet, and essayist specializing in Japanese literature.

== Biography ==
Schaarschmidt wrote numerous publications on Japanese literature and edited various anthologies. He met many of the writers whose works he translated into German in person and, through intensive conversations, learned a great deal about their views on literature, their way of thinking, and their worldview. He also wrote author portraits for radio programmes and other media. Until the German reunification, Schaarschmidt lived in West Germany.

On November 3, 1992, Schaarschmidt received the Order of the Rising Sun, 3rd Class for his contributions to the Japanese-German cultural exchange. In 1993, Schaarschmidt and fellow Japanologist Jürgen Berndt were awarded the Noma Translation Prize (野間文芸翻訳賞, Noma bungei hon'yaku shō). Authors whose works Schaarschmidt translated into German include Abe Kōbō, Betsuyaku Minoru, Ihara Saikaku, Inoue Yasushi, Kawabata Yasunari, Kitagawa Fuyuhiko, Miyamoto Musashi, Mori Ōgai, Nakagami Kenji, Nishiwaki Junzaburō, Ōe Kenzaburō, Tanikawa Shuntarō, and Yasuoka Shōtarō. Schaarschmidt also translated Mishima Yukio's Sea of Fertility tetralogy.
