= Hardboiled & Hard Luck =

1999 novel by Banana Yoshimoto

- First edition (Japanese)
- Author: Banana Yoshimoto
- Translator: Michael Emmerich
- Language: Japanese
- Publisher: Grove Press
- Publication date: 1999
- Publication place: Japan
- English publication date: 2005
- Media type: Print (Hardback & Paperback)
- Pages: 160 pp
- ISBN: 0-8021-1799-6
- OCLC: 57432320
- Dewey Decimal: 895.6/35 22
- LC Class: PL865.O7138 H3313 2005
- Preceded by: English: Goodbye Tsugumi (novel)

Hardboiled & Hard Luck (ハードボイルド／ハードラック Alt: Hādoboirudo. English) is a novel written by Japanese author Banana Yoshimoto in 1999 and translated into English in 2005 by Michael Emmerich.

== Plot summary ==
This book consists of two separate stories, making up the two parts of the book's title. The first story, Hardboiled, is written from the perspective of a woman who is hiking alone, passes a strange shrine and ends up in a hotel with a couple of surreal incidents that follow. Her back story is filled in as a mixture of narrative and dream sequences. The second story, Hard Luck, is about a woman whose sister Kuni is in a coma. Kuni's fiancé leaves her after the incident, but his brother continues to visit. It becomes apparent that he is interested in the protagonist of the story.

== Book information ==
Hardboiled & Hard Luck (English edition) by Banana Yoshimoto

- Hardcover – ISBN 0-8021-1799-6, published by Grove Press
