= A Beautiful Star =

- Theatrical release poster
- Directed by: Daihachi Yoshida
- Written by: Daihachi Yoshida; Seitarō Kai
- Based on: Beautiful Star by Yukio Mishima
- Starring: Lily Franky; Kazuya Kamenashi; Ai Hashimoto; Tomoko Nakajima; Kuranosuke Sasaki
- Music by: Takuma Watanabe
- Distributed by: GAGA
- Release date: May 26, 2017 (Japan)
- Running time: 127 minutes
- Country: Japan
- Language: Japanese

A Beautiful Star (Japanese: 美しい星, Hepburn: Utsukushii Hoshi) is a Japanese science fiction film directed by Daihachi Yoshida and based on the 1962 novel Beautiful Star by Yukio Mishima.

== Plot ==
The Osugi family consists of the father Jūichirō Osugi, mother Iyoko, son Kazuo and daughter Akiko. Over the course of the film, the father comes to believe that he is from Mars, the son that he is from Mercury and the daughter from Venus. Jūichirō works as a weather forecaster, Iyoko joins a pyramid scheme selling water, Kazuo is a bike messenger and Akiko is a college student with a complex about her beauty.

The family struggle, often in conflict, to address the threat of global warming.

== Cast ==
- Lily Franky as Jūichirō Ōsugi
- Kazuya Kamenashi as Kazuo Ōsugi
- Ai Hashimoto as Akiko Ōsugi
- Tomoko Nakajima as Iyoko Ōsugi
- Kuranosuke Sasaki as Katsumi Kuroki
- Yūichi Haba
- Yurie Midori
- Junichi Haruta
- Ryuya Wakaba
- Asuka Hinoi

== Awards ==
| Award | Category | Nominee | Result |
|---|---|---|---|
| 72nd Mainichi Film Awards | Best Supporting Actress | Ai Hashimoto | Nominated |
