= Chizuko's Younger Sister =

1991 coming-of-age fantasy film by Nobuhiko Obayashi

- Theatrical poster
- Directed by: Nobuhiko Obayashi
- Screenplay by: Chiho Katsura
- Based on: Futari by Jirō Akagawa
- Produced by: Shuji Tanuma; Kyōko Ōbayashi; Kuniyoshi Kawashima
- Starring: Hikari Ishida; Tomoko Nakajima; Sumiko Fuji; Ittoku Kishibe
- Cinematography: Shigeichi Nagano
- Edited by: Nobuhiko Obayashi
- Music by: Joe Hisaishi
- Production companies: Galuk; PSC; NHK Enterprises
- Distributed by: Shochiku
- Release date: May 11, 1991 (Japan)
- Running time: 120 minutes
- Country: Japan
- Language: Japanese

Chizuko's Younger Sister (Japanese: ふたり, Hepburn: Futari; lit. "Pair") is a 1991 Japanese coming-of-age fantasy film directed by Nobuhiko Obayashi from a screenplay written by Chiho Katsura, based on the novel Futari by Jirō Akagawa. It was filmed in Mukaishima Island, Hiroshima.

== Synopsis ==
The film centers on Mika Kitao (北尾 実加 Kitao Mika; Hikari Ishida), the clumsy and slow younger sister of Chizuko Kitao (北尾 千津子 Kitao Chizuko; Tomoko Nakajima), shortly after Chizuko dies in a freak accident. Although the sisters were very close, it is apparent that Mika lived in the shadow of her older sister's accomplishments. One night, Mika is almost raped by a stranger while walking alone outside. However, during the attack, a person resembling Chizuko silently gestures towards a rock on the ground, which Mika uses to hit her assailant and get away safely.

A few days later, the ghost of Chizuko appears again, admitting that she had been watching over Mika since her death; had Mika not been attacked, she probably would have stayed invisible. Chizuko implores Mika to go to a symphonic concert with Mika's best friend, Mako. At the concert, a man named Tomoya Kaminaga (神永哲也 Kaminaga Tomoya) mistakes Mika for Chizuko; he and Chizuko were lovers, and had agreed to meet at the concert. Mika reveals that Chizuko is dead, which Kaminaga did not know.

Mika's parents attend a piano recital that she is playing in. However, Mika's mother expresses concern that Mika will not be able to match the piano prowess of her older sister. Although Mika is nervous, Chizuko encourages her, and she performs well. Kaminaga also appears at the recital, presenting Mika with roses. Later, Mika and Mako participate in a relay race. Mika becomes tired while running, but Chizuko again appears to motivate her to do well. Mika's parents, while watching her sprint through the finish line, comment that she looks like Chizuko.

Mika becomes nervous after misplacing a love letter she had written to Kaminaga; the next day at school, several of her classmates have photocopies of the letter, which they use to tease her. Kaminaga later apologizes to Mika, revealing that his cousin Mariko (another girl in Mika and Mako's class) distributed the letter. Mako and Mika go to Mariko's house to tell her off, but only find her mother, who says that no one is supposed to be in the house, and that Mariko is staying with relatives. Mako concludes that her family must be bankrupt.

After Mika returns from a family trip, Mako breaks down and reveals that her father had died while Mika was away. That night, Mika receives a phone call from Mariko, who apologizes for stealing her love letter. Mariko says that she was jealous of Kaminaga and Chizuko's relationship, and because of that, disliked Mika as well. She then tells Mika that she and her mother are planning to commit suicide after she hangs up. Mika becomes distraught, but is unable to figure out where Mariko is.

However, Mariko appears at school afterwards, and thanks Mika for saving her life. Mika and Mako graduate from junior high. At their high school, everyone suggests that Mika play the leading role in the school play; this is the same role that Chizuko had previously performed. Meanwhile, Mika's father is forced to relocate for work, which upsets her mother. Later, Mika's mother receives a phone call that Mika has been hurt in an accident; this exacerbates her already-fragile psychological health, and she is admitted into a hospital. In actuality, Mika was not hurt, and she is left to take care of her family's house alone.

Due to her familial situation, Mika declines to perform the leading role in the play, instead becoming the prop master. While taking a cast and crew photograph, the girl with the leading role reveals that she had made the phone call to Mika's mother; Mika slaps her and walks away in disgust.

Mika's father again returns home for the New Year holiday. Mika's mother is taken out of the hospital for the holiday as well. However, Mika walks into the living room and finds a woman apologizing to Mika's mother; it becomes clear that Mika's father has had an affair. Mika's mother breaks down again, fearing that everyone is trying to abandon her. Mika follows her father outside and witnesses him kissing his mistress one last time. After helping her mother to bed, Mika reprimands her father for his actions and denounces his mistress as a bad person. Her father slaps her and tells her to go to her room.

Mika finds a letter-opening knife in Chizuko's room and decides to stab her father with it. Chizuko pleads with her to calm down, but Mika tells her to "go away"; Chizuko begins to cry as Mika goes downstairs with the knife. As she is about to stab her father from behind, Mika realizes that her father is crying, and then witnesses her parents reconciling. She goes back to Chizuko's room and tries to apologize to Chizuko, but finds that she is no longer there. Mika then looks in the mirror and sees Chizuko; she tells her to come out, but Chizuko says that she is in the "other world" and cannot return.

Mika's mother walks into the room and asks Mika what she is looking at; Mika says that, for a moment, she looked like Chizuko, which she finds strange, as they don't look much alike. Mika's mother says that, in fact, she looks exactly like Chizuko, but has her own personality.

Kaminaga asks Mika to travel around the world with him, but she declines, preferring to stay in her town. Mika begins to write about Chizuko, saying that this is another way to be with her.

== Cast ==
- Hikari Ishida
- Tomoko Nakajima
- Sumiko Fuji
- Ittoku Kishibe
