= Banana Yoshimoto =

Japanese writer (born 1964)

- 吉本 ばなな
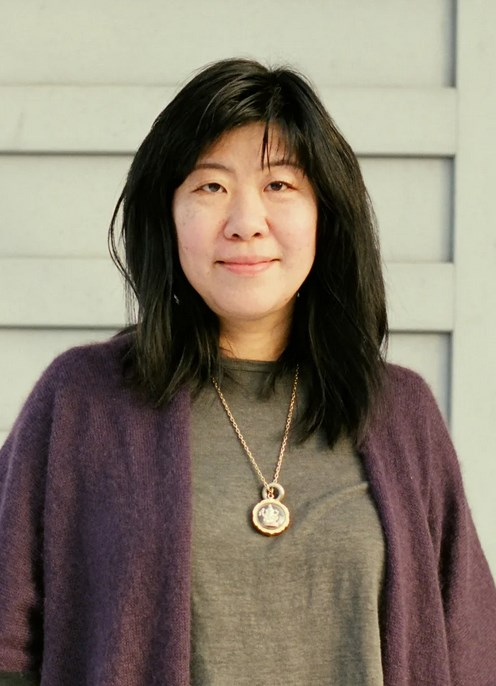
- Born: Mahoko Yoshimoto; July 24, 1964 (age 62); Tokyo, Japan
- Education: Nihon University (BA)
- Occupation: Novelist
- Writing career
- Period: 1987–present
- Genre: Fiction
- Website: Official website

Banana Yoshimoto (吉本 ばなな, Yoshimoto Banana; born 24 July 1964) is the pen name of Japanese writer Mahoko Yoshimoto (吉本 真秀子, Yoshimoto Mahoko). From 2002 to 2015, she wrote her name in hiragana (よしもと ばなな).

== Biography ==
Yoshimoto was born in Tokyo on July 24, 1964, and grew up in a progressive family. Her father was the poet and critic Takaaki Yoshimoto, and her sister, Haruno Yoiko, is a well-known cartoonist in Japan.

Yoshimoto graduated from Nihon University's College of Art with a major in literature. While there, she adopted the pseudonym "Banana", after her love of banana flowers, a name she recognizes as both "cute" and "purposefully androgynous."

Yoshimoto keeps her personal life guarded and reveals little about her certified rolfing practitioner husband, Hiroyoshi Tahata, or son (born in 2003). Each day she takes half an hour to write at her computer, and she says, "I tend to feel guilty because I write these stories almost for fun." Between 2008 and 2010, she maintained an online journal for English-speaking fans.

== Writing career ==
Yoshimoto began her writing career while working as a waitress at a golf club restaurant in 1987.

Her debut work, Kitchen (1988), had over 60 printings in Japan alone. There have been two film adaptations: a Japanese TV movie and a more widely released version titled Wo ai chu fang, produced in Hong Kong by Ho Yim in 1997.

In November 1987, Yoshimoto won the 6th Kaien Newcomer Writers Prize for Kitchen; in 1988, the novel was nominated for the Mishima Yukio Prize, and in 1989, it received the 39th Minister of Education's Art Encouragement Prize for New Artists. In 1988 (January), she also won the 16th Izumi Kyōka Prize for Literature, for the novella Moonlight Shadow, which is included in most editions of Kitchen.

Another one of her novels, Goodbye Tsugumi (1989), received mixed reviews and was made into a 1990 movie directed by Jun Ichikawa.

== Publications ==
Her works include twelve novels and seven collections of essays (including Pineapple Pudding and Song From Banana) which have together sold over six million copies worldwide. Her themes include love and friendship, the power of home and family, and the effect of loss on the human spirit.

In 1998, she wrote the foreword to the Italian edition of the book Ryuichi Sakamoto. Conversazioni by musicologist Massimo Milano.

In 2013, Yoshimoto wrote the serialized novel, Shall We Love? (僕たち、恋愛しようか?), for the women's magazine Anan, with singer-actor Lee Seung-gi as the central character. The romance novel was the first of her works to feature a Korean singer as the central character.

== Writing style ==
Yoshimoto says that her two main themes are "the exhaustion of young Japanese in contemporary Japan" and "the way in which terrible experiences shape a person's life".

Her works describe the problems faced by youth, urban existentialism, and teenagers trapped between imagination and reality. Her works are targeted not only to the young and rebellious, but also to grown-ups who are still young at heart. Yoshimoto's characters, settings, and titles have a modern and American approach, but the core is Japanese. She addresses readers in a personal and friendly way, with warmth and outright innocence, writing about the simple things such as the squeaking of wooden floors or the pleasant smell of food. Food and dreams are recurring themes in her work which are often associated with memories and emotions. Yoshimoto admits that most of her artistic inspiration derives from her own dreams and that she'd like to always be sleeping and living a life full of dreams. Yoshimoto's works play upon the duality of traditional and contemporary values, as well as the blending of dreams and reality, to form a distinct narrative style. Her postmodern style often favors the chatacter's internal world and development over convention plot structure and is open for and encourages one own's interpretations.

She named American author Stephen King as one of her first major influences and drew inspiration from his non-horror stories. As her writing progressed, she was further influenced by Truman Capote and Isaac Bashevis Singer. Also manga artist Yumiko Ōshima was an inspiration.

== Awards ==
In 1987, Yoshimoto won the Kaien Newcomer Writers Prize, for Kitchen. In 1988, she was awarded the 16th Izumi Kyōka Prize for Literature, for Moonlight Shadow. The following year, she earned two more accolades: the 39th Minister of Education's Art Encouragement Prize for New Artists (for the fiscal year of 1988), for Kitchen and Utakata/Sanctuary, and the 2nd Yamamoto Shūgorō Prize, for Goodbye Tsugumi. In 1995, she won the 5th Murasaki Shikibu Prize for Amrita, her first full-length novel. And in 2000, she received the 10th Bunkamura Deux Magots Literary Prize, for Furin to Nambei, a collection of stories set in South America.

Outside Japan, she has been awarded prizes in Italy: the Scanno Literary Prize in 1993, the Fendissime Literary Prize in 1996, the Literary Prize Maschera d'Argento in 1999, and the Capri Award in 2011.

The Lake was longlisted for the 2011 Man Asian Literary Prize.

== Bibliography ==
Titles between parentheses are rough translations if the novel has not been translated.

Japanese title	Direct English title translation	Official English title	Japanese publication date	English publication date
ムーンライト・シャドウ		Moonlight Shadow	1986	1993 (included in most editions of Kitchen)
キッチン		Kitchen	1988	1993
うたかた／サンクチュアリ	Transient/Sanctuary		1988	
哀しい予感		The Premonition	1988	2023
TUGUMI		Goodbye Tsugumi	1989	2002
白河夜船		Asleep	1989	2000
N・P		N.P	1990	1994
とかげ		Lizard	1993	1995
アムリタ		Amrita	1994	1997
マリカの永い夜・バリ夢日記	Marika's lengthy night・Dreamlog in Bali		1994	
ハチ公の最後の恋人	Hachiko's last lover		1994	
SLY		Sly	1996	
ハネムーン	Honeymoon		1997	
ハードボイルド/ハードラック		Hardboiled & Hard Luck	1999	2005
オカルト	Occult (Collection of essays selected by the author 1)		2000	
ラブ	Love (Collection of essays selected by the author 2)		2000	
デス	Death (Collection of essays selected by the author 3)		2001	
ライフ	Life (Collection of essays selected by the author 4)		2001	
体は全部知っている	The body knows everything		2000	
不倫と南米	Adultery and South America		2000	
ひな菊の人生		Daisy's Life	2000	
王国 その1 アンドロメダ・ハイツ	Andromeda Heights (Kingdoms, first installment)		2002	
虹	Rainbow		2002	
アルゼンチンババア		Argentine Hag (with drawings and pictures by Yoshitomo Nara)	2002	2002 Also published in English by RockinOn
ハゴロモ	Cloak of feathers		2003	
デッドエンドの思い出		Dead-End Memories	2003	2022
なんくるない	Don't worry, be happy		2004	
High and dry (はつ恋)	High and dry (first love)		2004	
海のふた	Lid of the sea		2004	
王国 その2 痛み、失われたものの影、そして魔法	The shadow of lost things, and ensuing magic (Kingdoms, second installment)		2004	
王国 その3 ひみつの花園	The secret flower garden (Kingdoms, third installment)		2005	
みずうみ		The Lake	2005	2010
イルカ	Dolphin or Are you there?		2006	
ひとかげ	Salamander or The small shadow		2006	
チエちゃんと私	Chie and I		2007	
まぼろしハワイ	Hawaii dreaming		2007	
サウスポイント	South point		2008	
彼女について	About her or About my girlfriend		2008	
もしもし下北沢		Moshi-Moshi: A Novel	2010	2016
どんぐり姉妹	The acorn sisters		2010	
アナザー・ワールド 王国 その4	Another world (Kingdoms, fourth installment)		2010	
ジュージュー	Sizzle sizzle		2010	
スウィート・ヒアアフター	Sweet hereafter		2011	
さきちゃんたちの夜	A night with Saki and friends		2013	
スナックちどり	Hostess bar stumble		2013	
僕たち、恋愛しようか?	Shall We Love?		2013	
花のベッドでひるねして	Take an afternoon nap on a bed of flowers		2013	
鳥たち	Birds		2014	
サーカスナイト	Circus night		2015	
ふなふな船橋	Funafuna Funabashi		2015	
