= NP (novel) =

1990 novel by Banana Yoshimoto

- First edition (Japanese)
- Author: Banana Yoshimoto
- Translator: Ann Sherif
- Language: Japanese
- Publisher: Kadokawa Shoten
- Publication date: 1990
- Publication place: Japan
- English publication date: 1994
- Media type: Print (Hardback)
- Pages: 194 pp
- ISBN: 0-8021-1545-4
- OCLC: 29255351
- Dewey Decimal: 895.6/35 20
- LC Class: PL865.O7138 N713 1994

NP (N・P) is a novel written by Japanese author Banana Yoshimoto (吉本ばなな) in 1990 and translated into English in 1994 by Ann Sherif.

== Plot summary ==
"NP" is both the name of the novel and of a short story collection within the novel's plot, a collection written in English by the character Sarao Takase, who committed suicide before he could translate it into Japanese. Three more people attempting to translate the collection have also committed suicide. The novel is narrated by Kazami Kano, the girlfriend of the last translator to die. Kazami becomes interested in Sarao's children while she is also trying to translate NP into Japanese.

== Book information ==
NP (English edition) by Banana Yoshimoto

- Hardcover - ISBN 0-8021-1545-4, published by Grove Press
- Paperback - ISBN 0-671-89826-4, published by Washington Square Press
