= Tomoko Nakajima =

Japanese actress

- Born: June 5, 1971 (age 55); Tokyo, Japan
- Occupation: Actress
- Years active: 1976–present

Tomoko Nakajima (中嶋朋子) is a Japanese actress best known for playing Hotaru Kuroita in the long-running television drama Kita no Kuni kara ("From a Northern Country"). She won the award for best supporting actress at the 12th Yokohama Film Festival for Tugumi.

== Filmography ==
=== Films ===
- Tokei – Adieu l'hiver (1986)
- Tugumi (1990)
- Chizuko's Younger Sister (1991)
- Dance till Tomorrow (1991)
- Parasite Eve (1997)
- Give It All (1998)
- The Crossing (2000)
- The Taste of Tea (2004)
- Tokyo Family (2013)
- What a Wonderful Family! (2016), Shigeko Kanai
- What a Wonderful Family! 2 (2017), Shigeko Kanai
- A Beautiful Star (2017)
- What a Wonderful Family! 3: My Wife, My Life (2018), Shigeko Kanai
- One Day, You Will Reach the Sea (2022)
- Till We Meet Again on the Lily Hill (2023)
- Yakushima's Illusion (2026)
- Till We Meet Again on the Starry Hill (2026)

=== Television ===
- Kita no Kuni kara (1981–2002), Hotaru Kuroita
- MPD Psycho (2006), Machi Isono
- Atsuhime (2008), Shigeno
