= Tugumi =

- Film poster
- Directed by: Jun Ichikawa
- Written by: Jun Ichikawa
- Based on: Goodbye Tsugumi by Banana Yoshimoto
- Produced by: Takio Yoshida; Osamu Kubo; Wataru Gotou; Toshio Nabeshima; Kazuyoshi Okuyama
- Starring: Riho Makise; Hiroyuki Sanada; Tomoko Nakajima; Misako Watanabe; Morio Agata
- Cinematography: Koichi Kawakami
- Edited by: Shizuo Arakawa
- Music by: Bun Itakura
- Production companies: Shochiku Fuji; National FM Broadcasting Council; Yamada Yoko Light Vision
- Distributed by: Shochiku
- Release date: October 20, 1990 (Japan)
- Running time: 105 minutes
- Country: Japan
- Language: Japanese

Tugumi (Japanese: つぐみ), also known as Tsugumi, is a 1990 Japanese romantic drama film written and directed by Jun Ichikawa. It is based on the novel Goodbye Tsugumi by Banana Yoshimoto, first published in 1989.

== Premise ==
Maria (Tomoko Nakajima) narrates her current life in Tokyo, as well as her past in the seaside town where she grew up. As a young girl, she lived in the town with her mother Masako (Setsuko Takahashi), alongside Maria's aunt (Misako Watanabe) and uncle (Shin Yasuda), who run an inn with Masako's help.

Maria grows up alongside her two cousins, Tugumi (Riho Makise) and Youko (Yasuyo Shirashima). Tugumi is a beautiful girl, but has been sickly from birth. As a result, she has been pampered for much of her life. This results in her becoming a spoiled brat with a sharp tongue, taking advantage of and insulting any person who crosses her path. Due to her beauty, she also exploits the many boys that like her.

Maria remembers their strained relationship with bittersweet feelings, but still misses the town and her former life there. Several years after they have parted, Maria receives a call from Tugumi, asking her to return for a last summer in town, which Maria perceives as an effort at reconciliation. Not much has changed, however, as Tugumi continues to get in trouble on a number of levels.

== Cast ==
- Riho Makise as Tugumi Yamamoto
- Hiroyuki Sanada as Kyoichi Takahashi
- Tomoko Nakajima as Maria Shirakawa
- Yasuyo Shirashima as Youko Yamamoto
- Misako Watanabe as Tugumi's mother
- Shin Yasuda as Tugumi's father
- Morio Agata as Maria's father
- Kazuo Zaitsu as Kyoichi's brother
- Masami Shimojō as Doctor
- Setsuko Takahashi as Masako, Maria's mother
- Gen'ichirô Takahashi as Cake Store Owner
- Mitsuru Fukikoshi

== Awards ==
12th Yokohama Film Festival

- Best Supporting Actress - Tomoko Nakajima
- 6th Best Film
