= Hajime Hana =

Japanese actor (1930–1993)

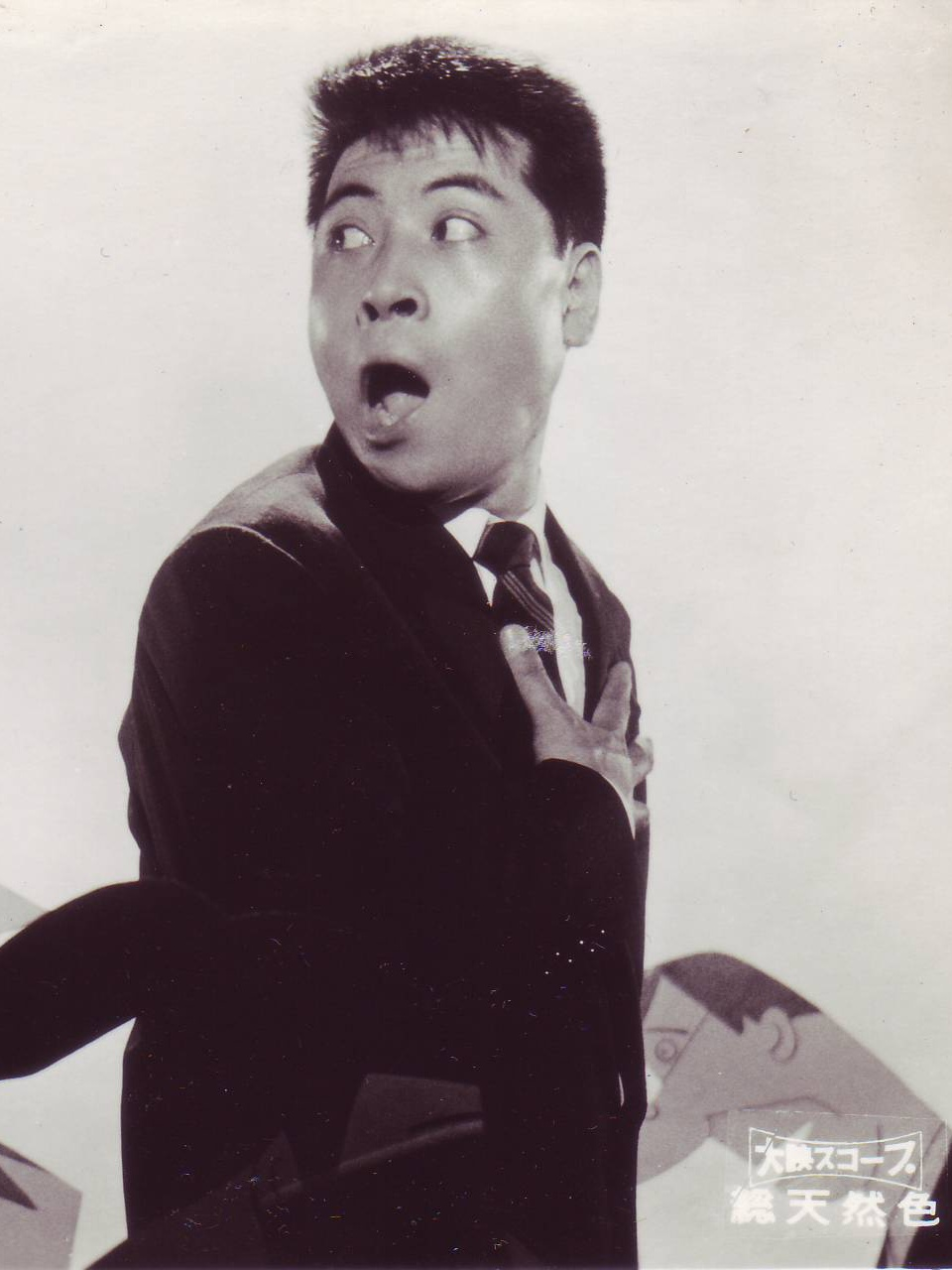
- Born: February 9, 1930; Toshima, Tokyo, Japan
- Died: September 10, 1993 (aged 63)
- Occupation: Actor

Hajime Hana (Japanese: ハナ肇, Hepburn: Hana Hajime; February 9, 1930 – September 10, 1993) was a Japanese actor. He was the leader of the comic jazz band The Crazy Cats, which featured such talent as Hitoshi Ueki and Kei Tani, and which starred in a series of film comedies (such as the "Irresponsible" (Musekinin) series at Toho) and in TV variety shows such as "Shabondama Holiday." He won the award for best actor at the 31st Blue Ribbon Awards for Kaisha monogatari: Memories of You.

== Filmography ==
- Ten Dark Women (1961) (as himself)
- Alone on the Pacific (1963)
- The Water Margin (1973) (TV series)
- Shinsho Taikōki (1973) (TV series)
- Graveyard of Honor (1975)
- Hokuriku Proxy War (1977)
- Proof of the Man (1978) - Detective Yokotawashi
- Hunter in the Dark (1979)
- Tantei Monogatari (1980) (TV series) - episode 18, Gonzaburo Shinoda
- A Distant Cry from Spring (1980)
- Tokugawa Buraichō (1992) (TV series)
- Kaisha monogatari: Memories of You (1988)
