= Tokyo Heaven =

1990 Japanese film

- Theatrical release poster

Japanese name
- Kanji: 東京上空いらっしゃいませ
Transcriptions
- Revised Hepburn: Tōkyō jōkū irasshaimase
- Directed by: Shinji Sōmai
- Written by: Yuhei Enoki
- Produced by: Masahiro Yasuda; Yoshiyuki Unno
- Starring: Kiichi Nakai; Riho Makise
- Cinematography: Yuzo Inagaki
- Edited by: Yoshio Kitazawa
- Music by: Hidetoshi Nonaka
- Production companies: Bandai Entertainment, Inc.; Directors Company; Shochiku Daiichi Kogyo
- Release date: June 9, 1990 (Japan)
- Running time: 109 minutes
- Country: Japan
- Language: Japanese

Tokyo Heaven (Japanese: 東京上空いらっしゃいませ, Hepburn: Tōkyō jōkū irasshaimase; lit. Welcome to the Sky Above Tokyo) is a 1990 Japanese film directed by Shinji Sōmai. It stars Kiichi Nakai and Riho Makise, marking the latter's debut film appearance.

The world premiere of the 4K restoration was held at the 39th Tokyo International Film Festival on October 29th, 2026, featuring a talk by Chris Fujiwara and Shozo Ichiyama where they dedicated the restoration's premiere to the film's screenwriter, Yuhei Enoki (Nozomu Enoki), who passed away in 2023.

== Premise ==
Yuu Kamiya, a young model, is killed in a traffic accident. Her death is covered up by Shirayuki, an executive in the modeling business. In heaven, Yuu is given the chance to return to earth on the condition that she cannot come in contact with anyone who knows that she has died. She decides to start her life over from scratch, becoming romantically involved with her former manager Fumio Amemiya, but things go awry when Shirayuki announces her death and plans a memorial service for her.

== Cast ==
- Kiichi Nakai as Fumio Amemiya
- Riho Makise as Yuu Kamiya
- Shōfukutei Tsurube II as Shirayuki

== Home media ==
In August 2021, the film was released on Blu-ray in Japan.
