= Lizard (short story collection) =

1993 short story collection by Banana Yoshimoto

- First edition (Japanese)
- Author: Banana Yoshimoto
- Translator: Ann Sherif
- Language: Japanese
- Publisher: Shinchosha
- Publication date: 1993
- Publication place: Japan
- English publication date: 1995
- Media type: Print (hardback & paperback)
- Pages: 197 pp
- ISBN: 978-4-10-383402-1
- OCLC: 30974251
- Dewey Decimal: 895.6/35 20
- LC Class: PL865.O7138 T6513 1995

Lizard (とかげ) is a short story collection by Banana Yoshimoto, written in 1993 and translated into English in 1995 by Ann Sherif. It is a collection of six short stories on love and the healing power of time.

In the American edition Banana dedicates her book to Kurt Cobain.

== Contents ==
- "Newlywed"
- "Lizard"
- "Helix"
- "Dreaming of Kimchee"
- "Blood and Water"
- "A Strange Tale from Down by the River"

== Book information ==
Lizard (English edition) by Banana Yoshimoto

- Hardcover - ISBN 0-8021-1564-0 published by Grove Press
- Paperback - ISBN 0-671-53276-6, published by Pocket Books
