= Kitchen (novel) =

1988 novel by Banana Yoshimoto

- First edition (Japanese)
- Author: Banana Yoshimoto
- Original title: キッチン
- Translator: Megan Backus
- Illustrator: Xue Jia He; Hyun Gyoo Kim
- Cover artist: Soonyoung Kwon
- Language: Japanese
- Genre: Fiction
- Publisher: MK
- Publication date: 1988
- Publication place: Japan
- English publication date: 1993
- Media type: Hardcover
- Pages: 226
- ISBN: 4-8288-2252-6
- OCLC: 25676042
- Dewey Decimal: 895.6/35 20
- LC Class: PL865.O7138 K5813 1993

Kitchen (キッチン) is a novel written by Japanese author Banana Yoshimoto (吉本ばなな) in 1988 and translated into English in 1993 by Megan Backus.

Although one may notice a certain Western influence in Yoshimoto's style, Kitchen is still critically recognized as an example of contemporary Japanese literature; The Independent, The Times, and The New Yorker have all reviewed the novel favorably.

Most editions also include a novella entitled Moonlight Shadow, which is also a tragedy dealing with loss and love.

There have been two films made of the story: a Japanese movie made in 1989 by Yoshimitsu Morita, and a more widely released version produced in Hong Kong by Yim Ho in 1997.

== Characters ==
- Mikage Sakurai — Young Japanese woman. Main character. Struggling with the loss of her grandmother, who was her last surviving relative. She moves in with Yuichi Tanabe and Eriko Tanabe after her grandmother's death.
- Yuichi Tanabe — Son of Eriko Tanabe. Main character. His mother died of cancer when Yuichi was a very young child. He lives with his loving transgender mother and supports Mikage in her time of grieving. He eventually loses his mother, and relies on emotional support from Mikage.
- Eriko Tanabe — Supporting character. Transgender woman. Eriko owns a nightclub, which is where she is killed by a man who feels as though she is tricking him by being a transgender woman. She is described as a very beautiful and kind woman.
- Sotaro — Mikage's Ex Boyfriend. Broke up with Mikage when her grandmother became ill and his reasoning was that she was hard to keep up with.
- Okuno — A girl who is obsessive over Yuichi and dislikes Mikage.
- Chika—A loyal employee who inherited the gay nightclub from Eriko and helps the relationship between Mikage and Yuichi.
- Mikage's Grandmother —A sweet lady who died and raised Mikage.

== Plot ==
Mikage's love of kitchens to her job as a culinary teacher's assistant to the multiple scenes in which food is merely present. Kitchen is a short window into the life of a young Japanese woman and her discoveries about food and love amongst a background of tragedy.

In Kitchen, a young Japanese woman named Mikage Sakurai struggles to overcome the death of her grandmother. She gradually grows close to one of her grandmother's friends, Yuichi, from a flower shop and ends up staying with him and his transgender mother, Eriko. During her stay, she develops affection for Yuichi and Eriko, almost becoming part of their family. However, she moves out after six months as she finds a new job as a culinary teacher's assistant. When she finds that Eriko was murdered, she tries to support Yuichi through the difficult time, and realises that Yuichi is probably in love with her. Reluctant to face her own feelings for him, she goes away to Izu for a work assignment, while Yuichi stays in a guest-house. However, after going to a restaurant to eat katsudon, she realises she wants to bring it to Yuichi. She goes to Yuichi’s guest-house and sneaks inside his room in the middle of the night to bring him katsudon. There Mikage tells him she doesn’t want to lose him and proposes to build a new life together.

In Moonlight Shadow, a woman named Satsuki loses her boyfriend Hitoshi in an accident and tells us: "The night he died my soul went away to some other place and I couldn't bring it back". She becomes friendly with his brother Hiiragi, whose girlfriend died in the same crash. On one insomniac night out walking she meets a strange woman called Urara who has also lost someone. Urara introduces her to the mystical experience of The Weaver Festival Phenomenon, which she hopes will cauterize their collective grief.

== Critical reception ==
Kirkus Reviews lauded the novella's "Timeless emotions, elegantly evoked with impressive originality and strength."

Michiko Kakutani, writing for The New York Times, stated that Yoshimoto demonstrated "wit", "clarity of observation", and "firm control of her story", specifically lauding her "wonderful tactile ability to convey a mood or a sensation through her descriptions of light and sound and touch, as well as an effortless ability to penetrate her characters' hearts." Furthermore, Kakutani said that "There is a pleasing directness to her writing, and while this sincerity can occasionally result in sentimentality, it more often than not seizes hold of the reader's sympathy and refuses to let go."

Regarding the inclusion of Moonlight Shadow with Kitchen, however, Kakutani criticized the editorial decision: "Its noisy echoes of that other novella—the same themes, emotions and even motifs all appear here—feel repetitious and cloying, and they distract the reader from this generously gifted young writer's achievement."

== Awards ==
- 6th Kaien Newcomer Writers Prize – November 1987
- 16th Izumi Kyoka Literary Prize - October 1988
- 39th Minister of Education's Art Encouragement Prize for New Artists – August 1988 (this prize was awarded for Kitchen as well as two other novellas by Yoshimoto: Utakata and Sanctuary)

== Book information ==
Kitchen (English edition) by Banana Yoshimoto

- Hardcover – ISBN 0-8021-1516-0 published by Grove Press
- Paperback – ISBN 0-671-88018-7 published by Washington Square Press
