= Jun Ichikawa =

Japanese film director (1948–2008)

- Born: 25 November 1948; Tokyo, Japan
- Died: 19 September 2008 (aged 59); Tokyo, Japan
- Years active: 1987–2008

Jun Ichikawa (市川 準, Ichikawa Jun; 25 November 1948 – 19 September 2008) was a Japanese film director and screenwriter. He was first a director of television commercials before adding filmmaking to his creative activities. His most famous film outside Japan is Tony Takitani, an adaptation of a short story by Haruki Murakami. He died of a cerebral hemorrhage after suddenly collapsing at a restaurant, shortly before his latest film, Buy a Suit, was to premiere at the Tokyo International Film Festival.

== Filmography ==
- Buy A Suit (2008)
- How to Become Myself (2007)
- Aogeba Tôtoshi (2006)
- Tony Takitani (2004)
- Ryoma's Wife, Her Husband and Her Lover (2002)
- Tokyo Marigold (2001)
- Zawa-zawa Shimo-Kitazawa (2000)
- Osaka Story (1999)
- Tadon to Chikuwa (1998)
- Tokyo Lullaby (1997)
- Tokiwa: The Manga Apartment (1996)
- The Tokyo Siblings (1995)
- Kurêpu (1993)
- Dying at a Hospital (1993)
- Kin Chan no Cinema Jack (1993) (segment "Kitto Kurusa")
- Tugumi (1990)
- No Life King (1989)
- Kaisha monogatari: Memories of You (1988)
- Bu Su (1987)
