= Chichi to Ran =

Novel by Mieko Kawakami

- First edition cover (Bungeishunjū, 2008) of the original novel
- Author: Mieko Kawakami
- Original title: Chichi to Ran (乳と卵)
- Language: Japanese
- Set in: Tokyo
- Published: December 2007 in Bungakukai
- Publisher: Bungeishunjū
- Publication date: 25 February 2008 (hardcover); 10 September 2010 (paperback)
- Publication place: Japan
- Media type: Print (hardcover and paperback)
- Pages: 138 (hardcover); 133 (paperback)
- Awards: 138th Akutagawa Prize
- ISBN: 978-4-16-327010-4 (hardcover); 978-4-16-779101-8 (paperback)
- OCLC: 213298983
- LC Class: PL872.5.A89 C55 2008

Chichi to Ran (Japanese: 乳と卵; lit. 'Breasts and Eggs') is a short novel by Mieko Kawakami, published by Bungeishunjū in February 2008. It was awarded the 138th Akutagawa Prize. It is part of a "loosely connected trilogy," including Heaven and All the Lovers in the Night. It has not been translated into English.

In 2019, Kawakami published the novel Natsu Monogatari (夏物語). It features a completely rewritten version of the original 2008 novella, but uses the same characters and settings. An English translation of Natsu Monogatari was published in 2020, under the original title of Breasts and Eggs. It is a completely different work from the original 2008 novella.

== Background and publication ==
Chichi to Ran (乳と卵) is Kawakami's second novel. Her debut novel, Watakushi Ritsuin Hā, Mata wa Sekai (わたくし率 イン 歯ー、または世界), was published in 2007 and was a candidate for the Akutagawa Prize. Kawakami first found literary success as a blogger, with her blog later reaching 200,000 hits per day. Chichi to Ran was first written in blog form in the mid-2000s. It was first published in the December 2007 issue of Bungakukai. It won the 138th Akutagawa Prize for the second half of 2007, which was announced on 16 January 2008. It was published as a hardcover book on 25 February 2008 by Bungeishunjū. It is characterised by a writing style that is separated by commas and continues endlessly without line breaks. It is written in the Kansai dialect of western Japan. Specifically, it is typified by Kawakami's use of the regional dialect Osaka-ben. It was reprinted in the March 2008 special issue of the Bungeishunjū magazine. A paperback edition was published by Bungei Bunko on 10 September 2010. The original 2008 novel has not been translated into English.

== Natsu Monogatari ==
In 2019, Kawakami published the two-part novel Natsu Monogatari (夏物語) 'Summer Stories'. The first half of Natsu Monogatari is a completely rewritten version of Chichi to Ran. The second half is a continuation of the narrative. It is considered a sequel to the original novella, using the same characters and settings. Natsu Monogatari was translated into English by Sam Bett and David Boyd, but kept the original title of Breasts and Eggs.

== Reception ==
Writer and then-governor of Tokyo, Shintaro Ishihara, who himself won the Akutagawa Prize in 1955 and was a sitting member of its selection committee, criticised the selection of Kawakami's novel for the prize. In Bungeishunjū he wrote, "The egocentric, self-absorbed rambling of the work is unpleasant and intolerable."
