= All the Lovers in the Night (film) =

2026 Japanese drama film

- Japanese promotional poster
- Japanese: すべて真夜中の恋人たち
- Directed by: Yukiko Sode
- Written by: Yukiko Sode
- Based on: All the Lovers in the Night by Mieko Kawakami
- Starring: Yukino Kishii; Tadanobu Asano
- Cinematography: Yasuyuki Sasaki
- Edited by: Azusa Yamazaki
- Music by: Suzuki Masato
- Distributed by: Bitters End
- Release date: 17 May 2026 (Cannes)
- Running time: 139 minutes
- Countries: Japan; France
- Language: Japanese

All the Lovers in the Night (Japanese: すべて真夜中の恋人たち) is a 2026 drama film written and directed by Yukiko Sode, based on the 2011 novel of the same name by Mieko Kawakami. The film stars Yukino Kishii and Tadanobu Asano.

The film had its world premiere in the Un Certain Regard section of the 2026 Cannes Film Festival on 17 May.

== Premise ==
The film follows Fuyuko, a freelance proofreader living a solitary and structured life, whose routine begins to change after she meets Mitsutsuka, a reserved high school physics teacher.

== Cast ==
- Yukino Kishii as Fuyuko
  - Tomo Nakai as Young Fuyuko
- Tadanobu Asano as Mitsutsuka
- Misato Morita as Hijiri
- Mai Fukagawa as Noriko
- Akihisa Shiono as Ohashi
- Yuko Nakamura as Kaori
- Kilala Inori as Nakamura
- Yuta Hayashi as Mizuno
- Tori Matsuzaka as Fuyuko's inner voice

== Production ==
All the Lovers in the Night is an adaptation of a novel by Mieko Kawakami. It marks the first feature-length screen adaptation of Kawakami's work. In 2025, it was announced that the novel would be adapted into a feature film directed by Yukiko Sode, set for release in 2026.

Japanese cinematographer Yasuyuki Sasaki shot the film on 16mm.

== Release ==
All the Lovers in the Night had its world premiere in the Un Certain Regard section at the 2026 Cannes Film Festival. The film is part of Japan's official selection lineup at the festival, coinciding with the country being honored as the Marché du Film's Country of Honour in 2026.

It will be screened in the Gala section of 39th Tokyo International Film Festival on 1 November 2026.

The film is scheduled for a theatrical release in Japan later in 2026. Bitters End acquired international sales rights and presented the film at the European Film Market.
