= Iinuma =

Iinuma (written: 飯沼) is a Japanese surname. Notable people with the surname include:

- Ai Iinuma (飯沼 愛; 2003), Japanese actress
- Masaaki Iinuma (飯沼 正明; 1912–1941), Japanese aviator
- Iinuma Sadakichi (飯沼 貞吉; 1854–1931), Japanese samurai
- Iinuma Yokusai (飯沼 慾斎; 1782–1865), Japanese botanist and physician

== See also ==
- Iinuma Station, a railway station in Nakatsugawa, Gifu Prefecture, Japan
