= Sisters in Yellow =

2023 novel by Mieko Kawakami

- Author: Mieko Kawakami
- Language: Japanese
- Genre: Crime fiction
- Publisher: Chuokoron-Shinsha (Japan)
- Publication date: February 20, 2023 (Japan)
- Publication place: Japan
- ISBN: 978-4120056284

Sisters in Yellow (黄色い家, Kiroii ie; lit. "Yellow House") is a 2023 novel by Japanese novelist Mieko Kawakami published by Chuokoron-Shinsha. Before its publication, it was originally serialized in the Yomiuri Shimbun. A "crime novel," the book is considered Kawakami's first work in the noir genre.

In 2023, it was announced that Picador acquired rights to publish Sisters in Yellow, as well as Dreams of Love, Etc, in English. An English translation by David Boyd was scheduled for spring 2025.

== Synopsis ==
Set amid the COVID-19 pandemic in Tokyo, Japan, the book follows the lives of four women thinking back to their once shared and ultimately conflicted past during the country's nineties, specifically in regards to a woman's death.

== Serialization ==
While writing Natsu Monogatari, Kawakami was asked, for the first time, to serialize a novel in a newspaper. She accepted and began writing Sisters in Yellow with some inspiration from her short story, "About My Daughter" (娘について, Musume ni tsuite), included in the 2022 book, Ashes of Spring (春のこわいもの, Haru no kowai mono).

Kawakami stated that, as part of serialization, she had to come up with a title immediately. At first, she thought about a house as an image representing family, after which the color yellow—representing many things, including feng shui—appeared in her head.

== Inspiration ==
In The New York Times, Kawakami stated that the book, written as a crime novel, "explores, from various perspectives, the relationship between facts and memories, victims and perpetrators." Although contemporarily set during the COVID-19 pandemic, Kawakami was also interested in exploring her characters' upbringings in the nineties, a time defined by the Aum Shinrikyo, the Great Hanshin earthquake, and the Shibuya-kei genre, among other groundbreaking events:

Now that around 25 years have passed, we’re finally able to examine the essence of the cultural accumulation of that era. Rather than writing about youth with rose-tinted glasses, there’s a way to come to terms with the 90s as a means to think about the present.

Kawakami also stated that the book was meant to be her "version" of The Makioka Sisters by Jun'ichirō Tanizaki.

== Critical reception ==
The book won sixth place in the 2024 Bookstore Awards in Japan.

The Japan Times reported "largely positive" reviews from both readers and critics following the book's publication in Japan.

Nippon lauded Kawakami's "first noir novel" as "a thought-provoking family narrative that remains with the reader when the book is over."

Good Life With Books, a property of The Asahi Shimbun, considered the book to be a tragicomedy with characters both carefree and shallow yet living in the backdrop of violent acts.

Akira Otani, writing for Book Bang, called the book so fantastic that it would likely make Kawakami's contemporaries resentful.

Kansai Woman called the book scary and full of pain, though nonetheless a thrilling read to its end even for its length.

== Coffee ==
Following Sisters in Yellow's publication in Japan, Kawakami partnered with the coffee company Keibunsha to create a blend inspired by the book. She had met Keibunsha store manager Masayuki Mishima in Hiroshima, after which she tried several blends to decide on the right one for the collaboration.

Kawakami, with avowed preferences for fruity tastes in coffee, ultimately chose a blend with beans sourced from Tanzania, Guatemala, and Ethiopia: a mixture bearing slight acidity and notes of citrus.
