= Mieko Kawakami =

Japanese writer

- 川上未映子
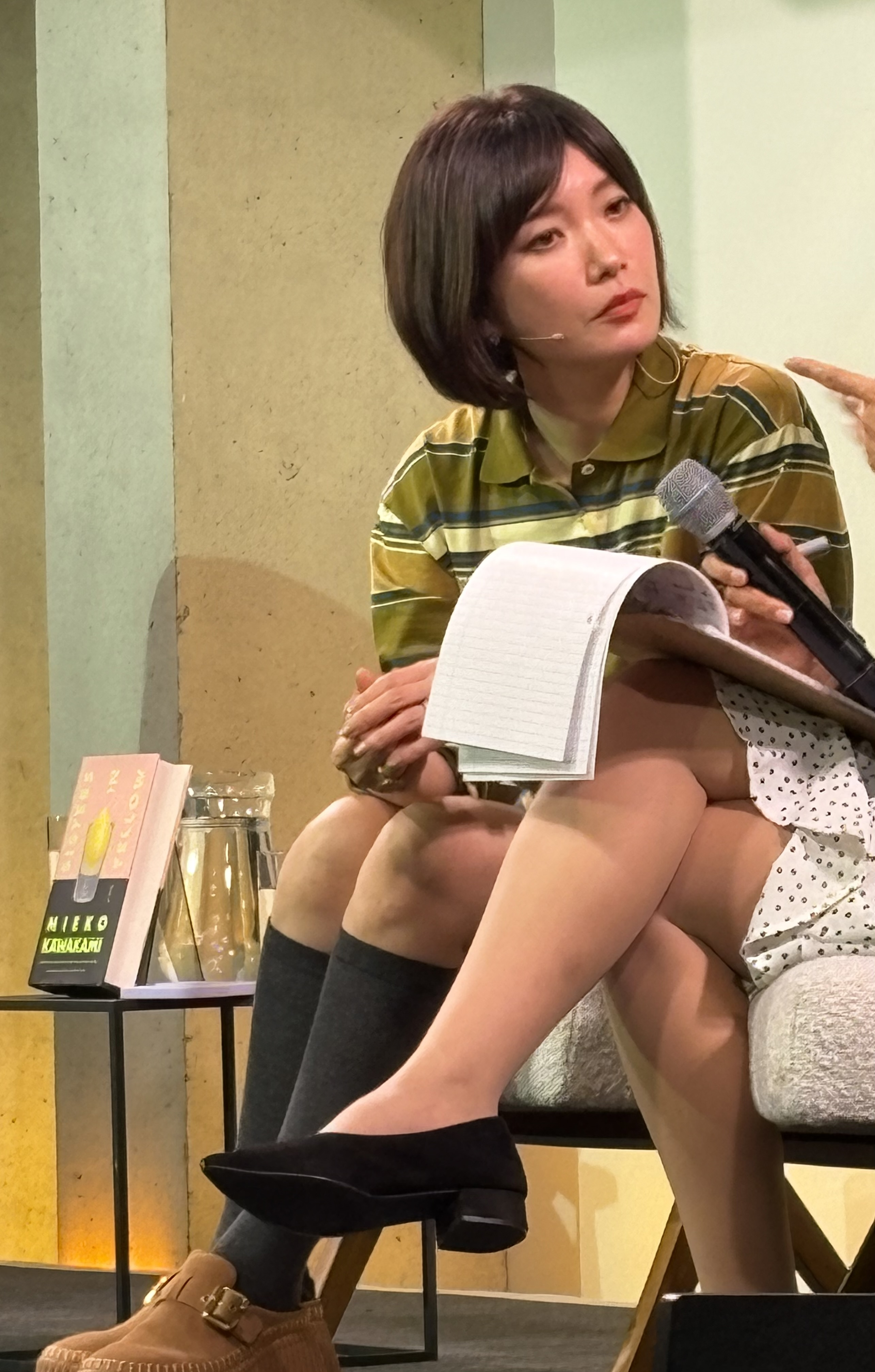
- Mieko Kawakami in 2026, speaking at the Edinburgh International Book Festival
- Born: August 29, 1976 (age 50); Osaka, Japan
- Occupations: Writer, poet
- Spouse: Kazushige Abe
- Children: 1
- Writing career
- Language: Japanese
- Genres: Fiction, poetry, short stories
- Notable works: Heaven; Breasts and Eggs; All the Lovers in the Night
- Notable awards: Akutagawa Prize; Tanizaki Prize; Murasaki Shikibu Prize
- Website: Official website

Mieko Kawakami (川上未映子, Kawakami Mieko; born August 29, 1976) is a Japanese writer and poet. She is best known for her 2019 novel Breasts and Eggs, (Note: The novel's original title in Japanese is Natsu Monogatari (夏物語) translating literally to Summer Stories.) an expanded and reworked version of her 2008 novella Chichi to Ran (乳と卵; lit. 'Breasts and Eggs'). Following the international success of Breasts and Eggs multiple of her earlier novels and most of her works since have been translated into English, among many other languages, and distributed internationally. Among them are Heaven (2009) and All the Lovers in the Night (2011), as well as Sisters in Yellow (2023), her first novel released since Breasts and Eggs. Her work is known for her "philosophical explorations of gender, class and ethics in modern society" and slice of life style. Kawakami's books often revolve around women and children.

Kawakami's work has won several literary awards, including the 2007 Akutagawa Prize for Chichi to Ran, the 2009 Murasaki Shikibu Prize for Heaven and the 2013 Tanizaki Prize for her short story collection Ai no yume to ka (愛の夢とか), among many more.

== Early life and music career ==
Kawakami was born in Osaka on August 29, 1976, to a working-class family. She was raised by her single mother with the family struggling with poverty. At 14 years old she started work in a factory.

In her early twenties Kawakami worked as a hostess and bookstore clerk while pursuing a singing career and taking correspondence courses in philosophy at Nihon University. She released three J-pop albums but quit her musical career in 2006 to focus on writing. Kawakami reportedly quit her music career after finding out how little artistic control she would have about her work.

== Writing career ==
Kawakami made her literary debut in 2006. She published her first novella, My Ego Ratio, My Teeth, And The World, in 2007, earning her a Tsubouchi Shoyo Prize for Young Emerging Writers. Before winning the Akutagawa Prize in 2008 for her second novella, Chichi to Ran, Kawakami was known in Japan primarily as the blogger behind "Critique of Pure Sadness" which she started to promote her singing career. The blog covered a broad range of topics including feminism, Kant and daily observations by the author. At its peak, her blog received over 200,000 hits per day. Chichi to Ran was originally published on that blog. The novella, revolving around a mother and daughter with communication issues and featuring frank discussions of sex and personal relationships, has been called "unpleasant and intolerable" by then-governor of Tokyo Shintaro Ishihara. The book was officially published in 2008 and went on to sell more than 250.000 copies.

Kawakami's fourth novel, Heaven, was published by Kodansha in 2009 and won the Murasaki Shikibu Prize the following year. The book follows the story of an unnamed middle schooler who is brutally bullied by his classmates. According to the author Heaven draws inspiration from Nietzsche's Thus Spoke Zarathustra and tries to address the "ultimate question of good and evil".

From 2015 to 2017, Kawakami conducted a series of interviews with Haruki Murakami, in which she notably asked him about women and sexualization in his novels. The edited volume of these interviews, titled Mimizuku wa Tasogare ni Tobitatsu (みみずくは黄昏に飛びたつ; Haruki Murakami: A Long, Long Interview) was published in 2017. In 2019 the two authors hosted a joint reading. Kawakami has described Murakami's place in Japanese literature as special, saying he is the only Japanese author that isn't read from an orientalist perspective by Western audiences. In 2016 Kawakami was featured in Granta Japan and Waseda Bungaku's collaborative "Best of Young Japanese Novelists" volume.

In 2019, Kawakami published Natsu Monogatari (Summer Stories), a considerably expanded and completely rewritten version of her novella Chichi to Ran. It received the 73rd Mainichi Publication Culture Award.

=== 2020–present: International breakthrough ===
In 2020, the English translation of Natsu Monogatari was published under the title Breasts and Eggs by Europa Editions. Katie Kitamura reviewed it favorably for The New York Times, observing, "Mieko Kawakami writes with a bracing lack of sentimentality, particularly when describing the lives of women." The novel would go on to achieve both critical and commercial success internationally. Heaven was translated into English and published by Europa Editions in 2021. It was shortlisted for the 2022 International Booker Prize. That year the English translation of All the Lovers in the Night, translated by Sam Bett and David Boyd, was published by Europa Editions and got to be a finalist for the 2023 National Book Critics Circle Award in Fiction.

Kawakami's eighth novel, Sisters in Yellow was originally serialized in the Yomiuri Shinbun, a Japanese newspaper, and published as a book by Chuokoron-Shinsha in 2023. The format invited Kawakami to improvise and write the chapters with little planning. The only thing she set beforehand were the thirteen titles of the book's chapters. An English translation by David Boyd was announced for a spring 2025 release by Picador. The book was eventually published by Knopf in a translation by Hitomi Yoshio and Laurel Taylor in early 2026.

=== Adaptations ===
Film

While, after its initial success, Chichi to Ran was said to be adapted for the screen, no such production ever materialized. The first film adaptation of Kawakami's work would be the 2023 drama Ice Cream Fever directed by Tetsuya Chihara based on the 2013 novella Ms Ice Sandwich, the first half of the untranslated Akogare. Chihara's background is in graphic design and he designed multiple book covers for Kawakami in the past. In adapting the seven-page short story into a feature film the two of them worked together, leading to Kawakami being credited as a co-writer on the movie. Ice Cream Fever was preceded by a spin-off short film centered on one of the main movie's characters called I SCREAM FEVER. This was followed by an adaptation of All the Lovers in the Night by Yukiko Sode starring Yukino Kishii and Tadanobu Asano in 2026. The film was screened at the 2026 Cannes Film Festival.

Theater

In December 2025, actor Izumi Aoyagi debuted Wisteria and the Three Women at Lumine 0 in Shinjuku. The one-woman show is based on the short story of the same name. The production marks the fourth collaboration of Kawakami with Takahiro Fujita's theater company Mum&Gypsy.

== Writing style and themes ==
Kawakami's prose fiction can be categorized as literary realism, while her poetic work has veered into surrealism and incorporated fantasy elements. In a 2019 interview Kawakami compared prose fiction with poetry and in the light of the 2011 triple disaster highlighted short poems' ability to be memorized in their entirety for "people [who] lost everything". She credits Ichiyo Higuchi as having made the biggest impact on her work, nothing her as "one of the first women to become a professional writer in Japan". In 2022 she said that Higuchi's Takekurabe changed her life.

=== Feminism ===
Kawakami is an outspoken feminist, seeing it as "a way of life" rather than an ideology, informing both her writing and her interpersonal relationships. On the other hand, books like Sisters in Yellow also serve to criticise the short-comings of contemporary feminist movements. Kawakami has also stated that she does not like her work being pigeon-holed as feminist literature and believes that labelling it as such is "limiting", preventing the reader from appreciating it for its own merits.

=== Osaka dialect ===
Born and raised in Osaka, the local dialect features heavily in Kawakami's work. For example, all dialogue in Breasts and Eggs is in Osaka dialect while the rest of the text is written in Standard Japanese.

== Personal life ==
Kawakami lives in Tokyo, Japan. She is married to the author Kazushige Abe, with whom she has a son.

Despite the consumption of alcohol being a common theme in many of Kawakami's works, such as Breasts and Eggs and Sisters in Yellow, she herself does not drink alcohol.

== Bibliography ==
=== Novels ===
Novels by Mieko Kawakami
Title	Year	Original ISBN	Original publisher	Notes	Ref(s).
Watakushiritsu In Hā Matawa Sekai (わたくし率 イン 歯ー、または世界; lit. 'My Ego Ratio in My Teeth, and the World')	2007	9784062142137	Kodansha		
Chichi to Ran (乳と卵; lit. 'Of Breasts and Eggs')	2008	9784163270104	Bungeishunjū	Originally published in the December 2007 issue of Bungakukai. An excerpt translated by Louise Heal Kawai was published by Words Without Borders in 2012.	
Heaven (ヘヴン, Hevn)	2009	9784062157728	Kodansha	Published in English by Europa Editions in 2021 (ISBN 9781609456214), translated by Sam Bett and David Boyd.	
All the Lovers in the Night (すべて真夜中の恋人たち, Subete mayonaka no koibito tachi)	2011	9784062779401	Kodansha	Published in English by Europa Editions in 2022 (ISBN 9781609456993), translated by Sam Bett and David Boyd.	
Akogare (あこがれ; lit. 'Yearning')	2015	9784103256243	Shinchosha	The first part of two, "Ms Ice Sandwich", was translated into English by Louise Heal Kawai and published by Pushkin Press in 2018 (ISBN 9781782273301).	
Breasts and Eggs (夏物語; Natsu Monogatari, lit. 'Summer Stories')	2019	9784163910543	Bungeishunju	Published in English by Europa Editions in 2020 (ISBN 9781609455873), translated by Sam Bett and David Boyd.	
Sisters in Yellow (黄色い家, Kiiroi Ie)	2023	9784120056284	Chuokoron-Shinsha	Before publication it was serialized in The Yomiuri Shimbun. Published in English by Knopf in 2026 (ISBN 9781035024131), translated by Laurel Taylor and Hitomi Yoshio.	

=== Short story collections ===
Short story collections by Mieko Kawakami
Title	Year	Original ISBN	Original publisher	Stories	Notes	Ref(s).
Sentan de, sasuwa sasareruwa soraeewa (先端で、さすわさされるわそらええわ; lit. 'On the tip, poking and being poked, that feels good')	2008	9784791763894	Seikyūsha		Poetry collection	
Mizugame (水瓶; lit. 'Water Vessel')	2012				Poetry collection	
Ai no yume to ka (愛の夢とか; lit. 'Dreams of Love, etc.')	2013	9784062177993	Kodansha		The rights for the English translation have been acquired by Picador in 2023, set to be published in 2026.	
Ashes of Spring (春のこわいもの, Haru no kowai mono)	2022	9784103256267	Shinchosha		Published in English as an audio book by Audible in 2025, translated by Hitomi Yoshio. "No Flowers" published in English on Literary Hub in 2025, translated by David Boyd.	

=== Selected short works in English ===
- "March Yarn" (short story), trans. Michael Emmerich, March was Made of Yarn: Reflections on the Japanese Earthquake, Tsunami, and Nuclear Meltdown, 2012.
- "About Her and the Memories That Belong to Her" (short story), trans. Hitomi Yoshio, Granta 132, 2015.
- "Where Have All the Sundays Gone?" (short story), trans. Hitomi Yoshio, Words Without Borders (On Memory: New Japanese Writing), 2015.
- "The Flower Garden" (short story), trans. Hitomi Yoshio, Freeman's: The Future of New Writing (ISBN 9781925603071), 2017.
- "How Much Heart" (flash fiction), trans. David Boyd, Granta Online, 2018.
- "The Flowers Look More Beautiful Now Than Ever" (essay), trans. Hitomi Yoshio, Granta Online, 2020.
- "Shame" (short story), trans. Louise Heal Kawai and Hitomi Yoshio, Granta Online, 2020.
- "Wisteria" (short story), trans. Hitomi Yoshio, Astra Magazine: Ecstasy, 2022.
- "The Door Between Us" (flash fiction), trans. Sam Bett, The New Yorker, 2024.

Kawakami also wrote Japanese translations of Peter Rabbit.

== Awards and recognition ==
Year	Prize	Work	Notes	Ref(s).
2007	Tsubouchi Shoyo Prize for Young Emerging Writers	Watakushi ritsuin hā, mata wa sekai	Won	
2008	Akutagawa Prize	Chichi to Ran	Won	
2009	Chūya Nakahara Prize	Sentan de, sasuwa sasareruwa sora eewa	Won	
2010	Murasaki Shikibu Prize	Heaven	Won	
2010	Art Encouragement Prize for New Artists	Heaven	Won	
2013	Tanizaki Prize	Ai no Yume toka	Won	
2013	Takami Jun Prize	Mizugame	Won	
2016	Watanabe Junichiro Prize	Akogare	Won	
2018	Grand Prix of Literary Associations	Ms Ice Sandwich (2018 English translation)	Shortlisted	
2019	Mainichi Publishing Culture Award	Breasts and Eggs	Won	
2022	International Booker Prize	Heaven (2021 English translation)	Shortlisted	
2023	National Book Critics Circle Award for Fiction	All the Lovers in the Night (2022 English translation)	Finalist	
2024	Yomiuri Prize	Sisters in Yellow	Won	

Japanese author Haruki Murakami called her his favorite young novelist and has described her writing as "ceaselessly growing and evolving".
