= Iwahashi =

Iwahashi (written: 岩橋) is a Japanese surname. Notable people with the surname include:

- Kunie Iwahashi (岩橋 邦枝, 1934–2014), Japanese writer
- Kunio Iwahashi (岩橋 邦雄, born 1939), Japanese field hockey player
- Iwahashi Zenbei (岩橋 善兵衛, 1756–1811), Japanese scientist and optician
