= Ms Ice Sandwich =

2013 novella by Mieko Kawakami

Ms Ice Sandwich (ミス・アイスサンドイッチ, Misu Aisusandoitchi) is a 2013 novella by Mieko Kawakami. It was translated into English by Louise Heal Kawai, and the translation was published in 2018 by Pushkin Press.

The work is about 100 pages long, and Morgane Chinal-Dargent of The Japan Society of the UK described it as "short". This was the first book by Kawakami to have an official English translation.

== Background ==
The translator was, as of 2018, located in Japan. She stated that it took about two months to write a draft of the English translation.

== Plot ==
It is about a fourth grader who discusses his life via narration. The name of the character is not stated. The novel's title comes from a female character who works at a store at the sandwich selling area. The nickname refers to blue makeup on her eyelids. The boy continually buys sandwiches to try to forge a connection, though Iain Maloney of The Japan Times wrote that the sandwich character "is more of an imagined entity", and that the boy is unable to have a connection with other people in his life. The story later focuses on his relationship with a female friend named Tutti, who encourages him to take his life in a new direction.

== Release ==
In 2013 the work was serialized in Shinchō, a literary magazine. In 2014 it, along with the story "Strawberry Jam Minus Strawberry" (苺ジャムから苺をひけば), was published in the collection Akogare (あこがれ).

== Reception ==
Erik R. Lofgren of Bucknell University wrote that the translator had "fluidly rendered" the content.

Chinal-Dargent stated that the translation was "excellent" and "faithful".

Terry Hong of Library Journal described it as "whimsical".

Maloney wrote that the book is "character-driven" and "impressionistic".
