= Murasaki Shikibu Prize =

Japanese literary prize for women authors

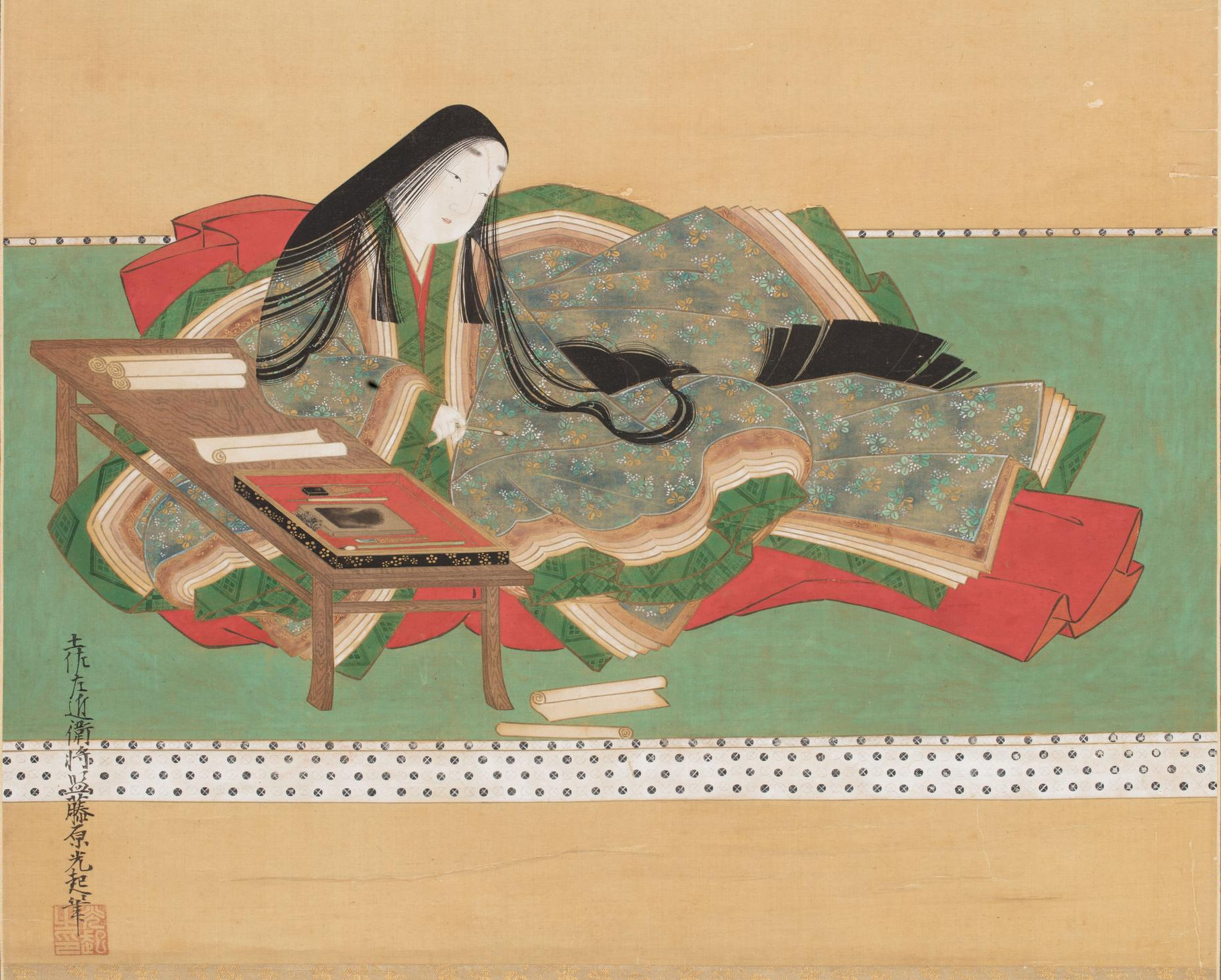
Murasaki Shikibu

The Murasaki Shikibu Prize (Japanese: 紫式部文学賞, romanized: Murasaki Shikibu bungaku shō) is a Japanese literary award awarded annually to an outstanding piece of literature in Japanese by a female author. It was established in 1991 by the city of Uji in Kyoto Prefecture in honor of Murasaki Shikibu's deep connection to the city of Uji. It awards a cash prize of 2 million yen, as well as a bronze statuette.

== Winners ==
Year	Author	Title	Japanese title	Publisher	Date of publication
1991	Akiko Ishimaru	Princess Shikishi	式子内親王伝――面影びとは法然	The Asahi Shimbun Company	December 1989
1992	Kaori Ekuni	Twinkle Twinkle	きらきらひかる	Shinchosha	May 1991
1993	Michiko Ishimure	Sixteenth Night's Bridge	十六夜橋	Komichi Shobo Publishing	May 1992
1994	Keiko Iwasaka	From a Nearby Town to the Yodo River	淀川にちかい町から	Kodansha	October 1993
1995	Banana Yoshimoto	Amrita	アムリタ	Fukutake Publishing Co., Ltd.	January 1994
1996	Sumie Tanaka	Dealing with Husbands	夫の始末	Kodansha	October 1995
1997	Kiyoko Murata	Crab Woman	蟹女	Bungeishunjū	June 1996
1998	Fumi Saito	Fumi Saito, Collected Poems 1928-1993	齋藤史全歌集 1928-1993	Daiwa Shobo	May 1997
1999	Hiromi Kawakami	God's Bear	神様	Chuokoron-Shinsha	September 1998
2000	Kazuko Saegusa	The City of Kazuko	薬子の京	Kodansha	January 1999
2001	Taeko Tomioka	Chōkū Shaku's Notebooks	釋迢空ノート	Iwanami Shoten Publishers	October 2000
2002	Yuko Kawano	Walk: Yuko Kawano's Collected Poems	歩く 河野裕子歌集	Seijisha	October 2001
2003	Minako Oba	The Diary of Urayasu Songs	浦安うた日記	Sakuhinsha	December 2002
2004	Machi Tawara	To Love the Tale of Genji	愛する源氏物語	Bungeishunjū	July 2003
2005	Yūko Tsushima	The Nara Report	ナラ・レポート	Bungeishunjū	September 2004
2006	Kaho Nashiki	Out of the Swampy Woods	沼地のある森を抜けて	Shinchosha	August 2005
2007	Akiko Baba	The World of Setsuwa	歌説話の世界	Kodansha	April 2006
2008	Hiromi Itō	The Thorn Puller: New Tales of the Sugamo Jizō	とげ抜き 新巣鴨地蔵縁起	Kodansha	June 2007
2009	Natsuo Kirino	The Goddess Chronicle	女神記	Kadokawa Shoten	November 2008
2010	Mieko Kawakami	Heaven	ヘヴン	Kodansha	September 2009
2011	Yoko Tawada	The Nun and Cupid's Bow	尼僧とキューピッドの弓	Kodansha	July 2010
2012	Kunie Iwahashi	A Critical Biography of Yaeko Nogami: Escape the Maze to the Forest	評伝 野上彌生子――迷路を抜けて森へ	Shinchosha	September 2011
2013	Mari Akasaka	Tokyo Prison	東京プリズン	Kawade Shobō Shinsha	July 2012
2014	Mayumi Mori	Bluestocking Adventures: The Making of Collected Women's Magazines	『青鞜』の冒険 女が集まって雑誌をつくるということ	Heibonsha	June 2013
2015	Aiko Satō	Curfew	晩鐘	Bungeishunjū	December 2014
2016	Toshiko Hirada	Freedom's Joke	戯れ言の自由	Shichosha	October 2015
2017	Kikuko Tsumura	Brazil, the Wandering Ghost	浮遊霊ブラジル	Bungeishunjū	October 2016
2018	Shion Mizuhara	Epistole	えぴすとれー	Hon'ami Shoten	November 2017
2019	Kayoko Yamazaki	Bread and Wild Strawberries: Memories of Foods in Serbia under Fire	パンと野いちご 戦火のセルビア、食物の記憶	Bungeishunjū	May 2018
2020	Kyoko Nakajima	Dreams of the Imperial Library	(夢見る帝国図書館)	Bungeishunjū	May 2019
2021	Natsuko Kuroda	Suite: Forgotten Future Business	組曲 わすれこうじ	Shinchosha	May 2020
2022	Yuri Nagura	Songs of Dawn at Dusk: Traveling to Russia in Search of Literature	夕暮れに夜明けの歌を 文学を探しにロシアに行く	East Press	October 2021
2023	Eiko Kadono	Iko Traveling	イコ トラベリング 1948ー	Kadokawa Shoten	September 2022
2024	Hiroko Minagawa	WIND ROSE	風配図 WIND ROSE	Kawade Shobō Shinsha	May 2023
2025	Minae Mizumura	An Ambassador and His Wife	大使とその妻	Shinchosa	September 2024
