= Astra Magazine =

Defunct literary magazine

- No. 2
- Editor: Nadja Spiegelman
- Categories: Literature
- Frequency: Biannually
- Founded: 2022
- First issue: April 12, 2022
- Final issue: October 11, 2022
- Company: Astra Publishing House
- Website: https://astra-mag.com/

Astra Magazine was an international literary magazine that was launched in April 2022 by Astra Publishing House and distributed through Penguin Random House. Its initial leadership included American writer Nadja Spiegelman as editor-in-chief, Samuel Rutter as deputy editor, and Shannon Jager as creative director, as well as Aria Aber as poetry editor. After releasing and selling out two issues, the publication was shut down by the end of the year, with Astra Publishing House citing "unexpected challenges" in its production.

== Content ==
During its year of production, the magazine published fiction, poetry, comics, art, and non-fiction. It published a total of two issues in print while regularly publishing online content, specifically essays, book reviews, and cultural criticism. As its publisher, Astra Publishing House wanted a magazine that had a "vision of international literature" and "was genuinely cosmopolitan," according to Spiegelman. The issues were printed in full color and distributed by Penguin Random House.

The first issue, centered on the theme of "Ecstasy," included pieces in several genres from Mieko Kawakami, Kim Hyesoon, Sayaka Murata, Ottessa Moshfegh, Solmaz Sharif, Fernanda Melchor, and Terrance Hayes. It sold approximately 9,000 copies.

The second issue, centered on the theme of "Filth," included pieces in several genres from Souvankham Thammavongsa, Aracelis Girmay, Sandra Lim, Clarice Lispector, Elif Batuman, Mariana Enríquez, Hans Lodeizen, Shuang Xuetao, Safiya Sinclair, Sheila Heti, and Ananda Devi. It sold approximately 8,000 copies.

Online, the magazine published the essay "Blunt-Force Ethnic Credibility" by Som-Mai Nguyen, which featured criticisms of Asian American literature and its relationship to language and diaspora, as well as works and statements by Ocean Vuong and Viet Thanh Nguyen. The essay became viral on the internet, prompting discourses about diaspora writing, translation, and cultural authenticity.

== Closure ==
In April 2022, after the magazine's debut, Spiegelman told Print that "In our moment, all of the systems for magazines are falling apart, like the print advertising dollars that once made them possible. There are no longer newsstands; there are no longer easy distribution systems. That means it's a really difficult time for magazines." Instead, the magazine worked with Penguin Random House to distribute issues through a "global distribution system" typically reserved for books rather than magazines.

Later, at the end of the year, before the production of their third issue, "Broke," Astra Publishing House announced that the magazine would be shutting down. Leying Jiang, the president of Astra Publishing House, cited that it was "a difficult year for publishing" and said the decision was partly made due to shifting priorities, as the publisher wanted to focus on other imprints like Astra House or Astra Young Readers.

The New York Times, in an article about the magazine's closure, observed it as possible evidence of "crumbling" infrastructure supporting literary magazines in the United States. Catherine Lacey, who contributed to the magazine's first issue, said its closure was cause for concern for the future of literary fiction in America.
