= Atom's Last Shot =

Japanese television series

- Also known as: Children of Atom
- Japanese: アトムの童
- Genre: Drama
- Written by: Marie Kamimori
- Starring: Kento Yamazaki; Yukino Kishii; Kouhei Matsushita; Joe Odagiri
- Narrated by: Kanda Hakuzan
- Country of origin: Japan
- Original language: Japanese
- No. of episodes: 9

Original release
- Network: TBS
- Release: October 16 – December 11, 2022

Atom's Last Shot (Japanese: アトムの童, Hepburn: Atom no Ko) is a 2022 Japanese television series starring Kento Yamazaki, Yukino Kishii, and Kouhei Matsushita. The original screenplay was written by Marie Kamimori. It is a drama about the video game industry.

In Japan, the show is called Children of Atom and aired on Sundays on TBS from October to December in 2022. Afterward, it was made available for streaming on Disney+ in certain countries, and Hulu in the United States.

== Synopsis ==
Umi Tominaga (Yukino Kishii) is the third-generation owner of Atom Toys. To save her family's failing business, she sets out to find John Doe, the in-universe developer of popular indie video game Downwell, to recruit as a video game developer. John Doe turns out to be the pseudonym of Nayuta Azumi (Kento Yamazaki) and Hayato Sugo. Nayuta, Hayato, and Koya Ogata were friends who used to make video games together but stopped six years ago when Koya committed suicide after getting their video game idea stolen by SAGAS, a large corporation. John Doe reunites and works to create a game for Atom Toys, while SAGAS actively tries to undermine their gaming development so they can take over the company and acquire their modeling technology.

== Cast ==
=== Main characters ===
- Kento Yamazaki as Nayuta Azumi
- Yukino Kishii as Umi Tominaga
- Kouhei Matsushita as Hayato Sugo
- Joe Odagiri as Akihiku Okitsu

=== Supporting characters ===
- Morio Kazama as Shigeo Tominaga
- Denden as Kengo Yaegashi
- Muga Tsukaji as Eiji Kagami
- Yasufumi Hayashi as Ukai Yoshihisa
- Hyunri as Aki Sagara
- Ai Iinuma as Yui Sugino
