= Manpuku =

Japanese television series

- Original title: まんぷく
- Genre: Drama
- Written by: Yasushi Fukuda
- Directed by: Yoshio Watanabe; Mojiri Adachi; Keita Hosaka; Kazufumi Matsuoka; Kei Nakaizumi
- Starring: Sakura Andō; Hiroki Hasegawa; Yuki Uchida; Nao Matsushita; Jun Kaname; Ryohei Otani; Kōji Seto; Manami Hashimoto; Kenta Kiritani; Masaki Suda; Isao Hashizume; Keiko Matsuzaka
- Narrated by: Mana Ashida
- Opening theme: "Anata to Toulattatta" by Dreams Come True
- Composer: Kenji Kawai
- Country of origin: Japan
- Original language: Japanese
- No. of episodes: 151

Production
- Executive producer: Hitoshi Manabe
- Producer: Reijirō Horinouchi
- Running time: 15 minutes
- Production company: NHK Osaka

Original release
- Network: NHK
- Release: October 1, 2018 – March 30, 2019

Manpuku (まんぷく), sometimes romanized as Mampuku, is a Japanese television drama series and the 99th Asadora series, following Half Blue Sky. It premiered on 1 October 2018, and concluded on 30 March 2019. The series is based on the lives of Momofuku Andō, who invented instant ramen, and his wife Masako. Sakura Ando was selected to play the lead and is the first actress to play an Asadora heroine who is herself a mother.

== Plot ==
Fukuko Imai graduates from high school in 1938 and is about to begin work at a high-class hotel in Osaka. Her oldest sister Saki is about to get married, so Fukuko arranges for an inventor, Manpei Tachibana, to do a show at the ceremony using his new slide projectors. A few years later, when Japan is at war, they meet again and start dating, but Fukuko's mother Suzu wants her to marry the man she selects. Manpei tries to help by finding a good hospital when Saki is diagnosed with tuberculosis, but Saki's death only makes Suzu object to him even more. But things turned bad when Manpei is arrested by the Kenpeitai for supposedly illegally selling military goods. Manpei withstands the daily brutal interrogations as Fukuko's hard efforts eventually unearth the truth that Manpei's partner was the culprit. Fukuko nurses him back to health and Suzu finally consents to their marriage.

During the war the whole family moved to the countryside and lived with Manpei's relatives to avoid allied bombings. After the war the family made Hanko to make a living. Later Manpei's friend Mr. Sera helped the family locate an abandoned factory near the sea where they could live and find a new way to make a living. Manpei decided to use the iron plates in the factory to make salt, which was a highly sought after commodity at the time. After the birth of his son and having witnessed how Fukuko suffered from malnutrition after giving birth, Manpei decided to work on a nutritional product for the public called Daneehon. But some of the workers were using grenades they discovered hidden under the factory floor for Blast fishing, resulting in the arrest of Manpei and his workers by the Allied Army for suspicion of conspiracy against the Occupation of Japan. Fortunately Manpei and co was found to be innocent and released.

Deneehon proves to be popular. Manpei and Mr. Sera arranged for a group of young workers to move to Tokyo to establish a sales company. Manpei also provided scholarships for the young workers to attend university part time and complete their education in Tokyo. But the Allied Army considered the scholarships as tax evasion and arrested Manpei. Fukuko enlisted the help of lawyer Azuma Taiichi, who helped Manpei to sell the rights of Daneehon to pay the fines. Azuma also helped Manpei to dissolve his Tachibara nutrition food company, in order to evade the tax authorities. But the tax authorities went to Fukuko's home to confiscate her private assets. Fukuko also gave birth to the couple's daughter Sachi while Manpei was imprisoned. Azuma then asked Manpei to sue the tax authorities for treating scholarships as a form of tax evasion, which was not true. Azuma also turned to the media to put pressure on the tax authorities. In the end the tax authorities decided to release Manpei as a condition for Azuma to withhold the case.

After Manpei is released, the show continues for another 74 episodes, during which Manpei eventually devises a method for producing instant ramen.

== Cast ==
=== Imai's family ===
- Sakura Andō as Fukuko Imai
- Keiko Matsuzaka as Suzu Imai, Fukuko's mother
- Yuki Uchida as Saki Imai, Fukuko's sister

=== Kōda's family ===
- Nao Matsushita as Katsuko Kōda, Fukuko's sister
- Jun Kaname as Tadahiko Kōda, Katsuko's husband
- Yukino Kishii as Taka Kōda, Katsuko's daughter
- Konomi Okuno as Yoshino Kōda, Katsuko's daughter
- Ryuto Ueda as Shigeyuki Kōda, Katsuko's son
- Yuki Takada as Manabu Kōda, Katsuko's son

=== Osaka Toyo Hotel employee ===
- Manami Hashimoto as Megumi Hoshina, a hotel senior
- Kenjirō Fujiyama as Kōkichi Noro, Fukuko's colleague
- Narumi as Utae Kashida, a senior at the telephone exchange agency
- Kotarō Soganoya as Saburō Omaeda, a hotel manager

=== Others in Osaka ===
- Hiroki Hasegawa as Manpei Tachibana, Fukuko's husband
- Ryohei Otani as Shinichi Onozuka, Saki's husband
- Isao Hashizume as Ryōzō Mitamura
- Kataoka Ainosuke VI as Keisuke Kajitani, Manpei's partner
- Kenta Kiritani as Katsuo Sera, a trading company's manager
- Rena Matsui as Toshiko Kano
- Kumi Kureshiro as Hana Ikegami
- Kenta Hamano as Zen'nosuke Maki, a dentist

=== Others ===
- Kōji Seto as Shigeru Kanbe
- Akiyoshi Nakao as Kōsuke Oka
- Masaki Suda as Taichi Azuma, a young lawyer
- Maynard Plant (Monkey Majik) as Harry Bingham, a soldier
- Blaise Plant (Monkey Majik) as Jonathan May, a soldier
- Taiiku Okazaki as Charlie Tanaka, a Japanese soldier
- Masaya Kato as Akira Kawakami
- Riho Makise as Shinobu Kawakami
- Mai Fukagawa as Yoshino Kōda
- Eiji Okuda as Ryuzo Toigaki
- Tetsushi Tanaka as Kamasaku Saruwatari

Preceded by Half Blue Sky	Asadora; October 1, 2018 – March 30, 2019	Succeeded by Natsuzora
