= Vivant (TV series) =

2023 Japanese spy thriller television series

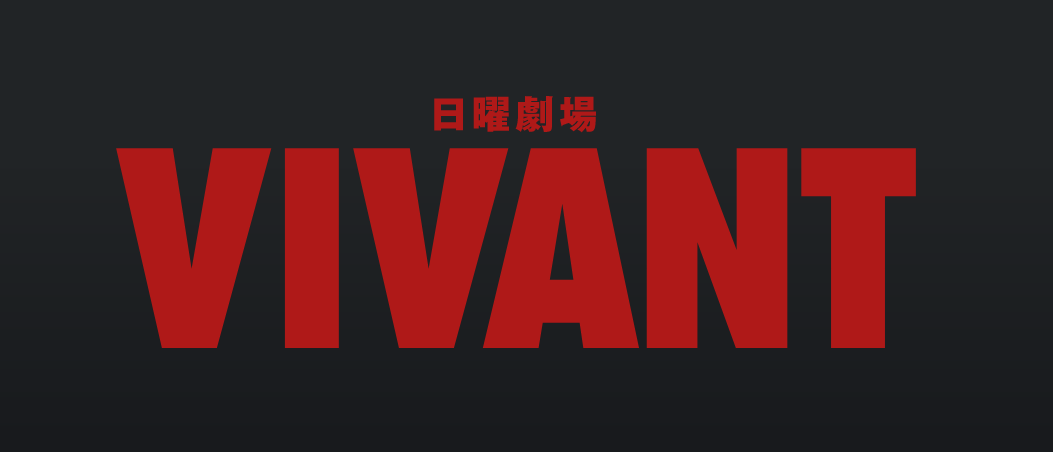
- Created by: Katsuo Fukuzawa
- Written by: Hiroyuki Yatsu; Lee Jeong Mi; Hayato Miyamoto; Nana Yamamoto; Akio Miyoshi; Shunichi Hatakeyama; Masahiko Shirakawa
- Directed by: Katsuo Fukuzawa; Yōhei Miyazaki; Akiko Kato
- Starring: Masato Sakai; Hiroshi Abe; Fumi Nikaido; Ryo Ryusei; Tori Matsuzaka; Kazunari Ninomiya; Koji Yakusho
- Narrated by: Megumi Hayashibara
- Theme music composer: Akira Senju
- Composer: Akira Senju
- Country of origin: Japan
- Original language: Japanese
- No. of seasons: 2
- No. of episodes: 24

Production
- Executive producer: Katsuo Fukuzawa
- Producers: Kazutaka Iida; Miyuki Ogata; Kaori Hashizume
- Running time: 54–108 min
- Production company: TBS

Original release
- Network: JNN (TBS)
- Release: July 16 – September 17, 2023

Vivant (ヴィヴァン, stylized as VIVANT) is a Japanese spy thriller television series created by Katsuo Fukuzawa, that started airing on 16 July 2023, starring Masato Sakai and assemble casts

The screenplay was co-written by Katsuo Fukuzawa, who is also the director and executive producer. Fukuzawa was also director of Hanzawa Naoki and Black Forceps. The storyline was not revealed until the first episode aired. By air time, the cast also was still being revealed. The drama has as co-stars Hiroshi Abe, Fumi Nikaido, Tori Matsuzaka, and Koji Yakusho. Additional cast members include Kento Hayashi, Ryo Ryusei, Rin Takanashi and Rei Dan. At the end of the first episode, the appearance of Arashi's Kazunari Ninomiya was revealed.

A sequel was announced for the 2026 "Sunday Theater" slot in 2026 (date undecided). On October 21, 2025, 26 names from the cast were revealed, most of them returning from the first season, as well as the first images from a teaser trailer and the reveal of the filming location in Azerbaijan.

A movie was announced on November 8, 2026, after the airing of the last episode of the second season, to be screened on December 4, 2026. The movie's story is still pending. On November 11, the movie's poster image was revealed. There are 2 versions: on the mobile one, the image of Nogi and his alter ego, F; on PC, the image of the cast. In both cases, the names of 17 cast members is included.

On November 15, it was announced that the series' spinoff, "Vivant: the Origin Story", based on the backstory of character Drum, is to air in the spot previously occupied by the main story. The spinoff starts airing on November 22.

== Plot ==
A Japanese businessman with a secret personality is sent to central Asia to find and collect the money erroneously transferred out of the company he works for. He gets involved in an international conspiracy, when the police considers him part of a criminal organization.

== Story ==
=== Season 1 ===
Yusuke Nogi, Chief of Energy Development Division 2 at Marubishi Corp., is main suspect in the erroneous transfer of US$100 million (=13 billion yen). Nogi searches for the culprit in fictional Republic of Balka, in central Asia, helped by his friend at the CIA. Al-Zaer, suspected of buying diamonds with the stolen money, asks Nogi if he was "Vivant", then sets off a bomb on his body to evade capture by the police. Nogi, who local police think is responsible, barely escapes it. Inspector Nozaki, working with the Japanese Embassy, has been following him. Nozaki takes Nogi to the hospital where Dr. Yuzuki works. Nogi, Nozaki and Yuzuki, rescued by Nozaki's friend Drum, barely escape the local police by entering the Japanese Embassy. Inside the Embassy, Nozaki continues analyzing the word "Vivant", arriving to a different reading: "Beppan", meaning "another group", that could mean anything from a government agency not officially recognized, a secret identity (as in a spy), or a different personality, such as the "other" Nogi that has appeared in front of only him. Back in Japan, Nogi and Nozaki, with the help of Shōta Tōjō, a Detective in the Cybercrime Division of the Tokyo Metropolitan Police Department, discover the origin of the theft of funds, a hacker by the name of Riho Ohta, a member of the company's finance department, under instructions from Isao Yamamoto. Nogi learns that Yamamoto is a monitor of a terrorist group called "Tent". Shun Kurosu, in front of a tied up Yamamoto, reveals he is part of Beppan, as is his senior, Nogi.

Nozaki, investigating "Beppan", "Tent", and all things related, discovers Yamamoto's body, becomes suspicious about Nogi, since he knew about Yamamoto's identity. Both Nogi and Nozaki go to Balka, the first (as part of Beppan), the latter seeking the help of Balkan police. Nogi secretly follows Nozaki to get information about Ali, GLF'S CEO and revealed Tent senior executive, and gets to him, before Nozaki. Nozaki's contact at the FBI reveals Nogi as Hayato Tango. Nogi, raised in an orphanage, was trained at a military school, graduating with high notes. In Nogi's family home, Nogi's uncle, Hiromichi, tells Nozaki that Nogi's father, Suguru, a retired policeman, took his family to Balka on an Agricultural mission. Nogi's mother was killed trying to protect him (Nogi's recurring memory), and his father was believed to have died in a civil war. Hiromichi shows Nozaki a katana sword, in the family for generations. The family crest is also the symbol used by Tent. Somewhere else, Nogi bounds Ali and threatens killing his family to get information on Tent's leader. Ali sees a photo Nogi has, and tells him that that is Nogōn Beki, Tent's leader. Ali sees Nogi's family photo and asks him why he had a photo of a young Beki, revealing that Nogōn Beki and Suguru Nogi are the same person. Image changes to a meeting room, with Beki at the end of a conference table, and his son (Ninomiya, name still unrevealed), sitting next to him, asking "Father, are you sure you want to start?". The scene zooms out to reveal the Tent logo / Nogi family crest on the wall.

Tent starts its members' meeting. Beki kills an embezzler in one katana stroke. Nogi, begging forgiveness, frees Ali and his family. Ali hands Nogi a paper with numbers on it, which Nogi has to decipher in a short time. Nogi reflects on his past life, causing a conflict between him and his alter ego, F, born out of Nogi's necessity to be strong. F calls Nogi an idiot, that Beki is not his father anymore and that he should kill him, but Nogi says he wants to meet and talk with him, even if he is Tent's leader. F says Nogi seeks from Beki (love), what he already has in Yuzuki and Jamin, the Balkan girl that (with her father) had saved him. Sakurai confirms that Nogi is being investigated by Nozaki, who learns that Suguru Nogi was one of his seniors in the police. Kurosu receives Ohta, after freeing her from jail, and both work on the number list (a QR code). Yuzuki is in the hospital where Jamin is being operated on. Nogi is reminded of his own family. Time is running out, but end up favorably. Nozaki has Nogi followed and Ohta's building surveilled. Ohta threatens to kill herself, sure that they are friends of Yamamoto. But Nogi and Kurosu prove to her that Yamamoto is also their enemy. Shinjō rings the bell, alerting Nogi. Ohta opens the door. Shinjō sees Nogi "ready to eat" and nothing more. Nozaki who is sure there is a secret room. There is a meeting at the bidding venue of the Agency for Natural Resources and Energy by the Ministry of Economy, Trade and Industry. Nogi's section and another district's business (Kurosu's) are awarded. When the meeting ends, the one in charge tells some people to stay. Nogi, Kurosu and other 4 people remain. The true meeting starts, with Sakurai's entrance.

Suurounded by Beppan's members, Nogi shares his information about Tent, including that leader Nogōn Beki is his father. Beppan discovers that the Russian anti-government group, Vostania, and Nokor, Tent's second-in-command, met near the Russian border. Nozaki, working with the Japanese and Balkan police, suspecting Nogi's involved with Tent, are discovered by Nogi. With an elite team, Nogi ambushes Vostania's troops, later disguising themselves to liaise with Tent. Nogi grabs Nokor, pulling his gun, and shoots his own team. As the Tent team counters, Nogi confesses "I am Beki's son". Nokor takes Nogi and an injured Kurosu to Tent's hideaway. Inside a cell, Kurosu gets mad at Nogi, who finally meets his father, Beki. Beki orders Nogi to shoot Kurosu. An aircraft carries the ambush team members Nogi shot. Nokor extracts more details from Nogi. Beki confirms Nogi as his son, Yusuke after testing his DNA. Kurosu is taken to an undisclosed location. Beki shows Nogi Tent's confidential books. Tent illegal funds are invested in several orphanages. Nogi earns Beki's trust, having uncovered the director's corruption. Nogi also finds that Tent's escalated terror operations three years prior, aim to buy lands in northwest Balka. According to Beki, a seismic event had uncovered a rich vein of 99% pure fluorite deep underground. Beki wanted to take this land, pre-empting governmental and foreign claims, redirecting mining revenues to sustain the orphanages. Nogi proposes a fundraising method via credit trades instead of their usual tactics.

Beki reminisces about Tent's inception, intertwined with tales of his beloved wife, Akemi. He accepts there was past resentments towards Japan's Public Safety Commission. Though he assures Nogi they are no longer targeting Japan, intel on the fluorite, known only to Tent's top brass and Nokor's confidante Gobi, has leaked to Balka's government. Nogi's arrival correlates with these breaches. The teammates Nogi shot are alive, recuperating in Japan. Nogi confesses to Beki about his true mission.

Beki cut Nogi's bindings with the katana, letting him go. Everyone's taken aback. Nokor claims he's helping a traitor. Beki realized that Nogi was working undercover. Before heading to Balka, after Jamīn told Nogi that Beki was a "good person" when she saw a photo, Nogi became curious about the Tent's true agenda. He told Nozaki about potentially playing double agent, entrusting him with taking care of the others. When Beki questions Nogi's true motives, Nogi says he is willing to help him and the Tent get the rights to mine fluorite.

Foreign Minister Waniz tried to scam Nokor, making him give 25% of the fluorite mining rights to the government and their partner, Oliva Chemical, and in return for mining expertise and sales routes for free. Once the deal is signed, Waniz, with his insider, Gobi, pushes for a joint development between the government, Berelle Industries, and Oliva Chemical, getting 55% of the mining rights. But Nokor, one step ahead, ropes in Nishioka from Oliva Chemical, claiming back the rights and a total of 60% mining ownership. Waniz, exposing a shady link between Muruudu and the Tent, argues that no one will accept a project tied to a terror group and threatens to take it by force. Beki steps in, declaring Balka's intent to cherish its diverse religious and ethnic backgrounds and promote wealth equality. Backed by the Attorney General and the Minister of Justice, orphanage-raised Chingis nails Waniz with bribery charges, using a video, taken by Nozaki, of Waniz taking money from Nishioka.

Beki, seeking a deal with Niahioka, announces the Tent's dissolution and surrenders. He is taken to Japan. Shinjo, a mole in the police force, breaks him free. Beki targets the home of Shiro Uehara, a key figure from the Balka civil unrest 40 years ago, joined by Batraka and Piyo. But Nogi, shoots him. In his final moments, Beki tells Nogi, "You're what I'm proud of." Nokor, learns from Nogi that Beki's gun was empty. Beki was prepared to face death. When Nokor shares plans to honor Beki with a grave in Balka, Nogi responds that it's not yet time to pay respects. Nozaki ensures stories align, painting the scene of a fire at his house as a suicide attempt by Beki's group. Mission accomplished, Nogi returns to Kanda Myojin Shrine, where he's warmly welcomed by Yuzuki and Jamīn. Their reunion is short-lived, as he's alerted to an emergency call-up from "F" for another mission.

=== Season 2 ===
Season 1 last episode scenes are shown with the backstory of the day Nogi shot his father as well as his meeting with Yuzuki and Jamin. Nogi meets Sakurai in the Ministry of Defense's underground command room, in front of the supercomputer "AI Hayato", which was analyzing large amounts of data, such as hospital surveillance camera footage and social media, identifying individuals most likely involved in leaking information about Beppan. Five members of the Beppan team, including Korosu, have disappeared. Sakurai thinks there may be a link to what happened in the Tent incident. Nogi gets information regarding Korosu from Nokor. He also receives information from hacker Ohta. The five men seem to have been taken to different countries. Nogi travels to Cyprus with Drum.

In Cyprus, Nogi captures Ari, but it is "F" who questions him. Ari reveals that he hired Shinjo to be a monitor in the Tent, but ignores his whereabouts. While the Ground Self-Defense Force is eavesdropping on a conversation between Yuzuki, Jamin and Nogi, Nozaki is searching for Tojo and Shinjo to no avail. Blue Walker traces Shinjo's whereabouts to Thailand. Nogi goes to Thailand via Cambodia, and, with Drum's help, he finds Chucky, a wealthy Thai businessman who is hosting Shinjo in his mansion. While Shinjo is thought to be the one leaking information about the Beppan unit, it remains unclear whether he actually sold that information to overseas brokers. According to Blue Walker, Shinjo did contact overseas brokers, but the nature of the communication was a request to meet and speak in person. Nogi keeps talking with Ari, who now knows that Nogi has a split personality.

Beppan suspects that, among the 11 people who knew about the Balka secret team's whereabouts, there is a traitor, of which Nogi and AI Hayato believe at 95% that it is Shinjo. When Shinjo was aprehended, it was revealed he was not involved at all. AI Hayato recalculates, including Nozaki's activity information, which included what Nogi was reporting to him. Nogi feels betrayed. Tojo thwarted Nogi's trip to Thailand, leading him and others to Vladivostok. Regarding the mega activity that seems to involve the CIA, Nozaki, when he talks about Jamin with Ali, about returning to Balka, Ali absolutely refuses that action, suggesting that there could be a major conflict in the future. It is possible that that conflict could involve Nokor and the post– (or, even, pre–)Tent group.

Nozaki meets Fan Linxing, former director of the Chinese Ministry of Public Security, currently in charge of "Xinxi", the Chinese version of Beppan. Beppan suspects that, since they have eliminated several Chinese agents, the group may hold a grudge against Beppan. That could be a reason for the kidnapping of the members of the secret team. Fan persistently questions Nozaki about Tent, though the organization does not exist anymore. However, she reacts when learning about the organization's orphanage. A couple of her actions may seem careless, but they could be part of her plan to test Nozaki.

Nozaki surrenders to Xinxi in exchange for the release of a member of his unit. To find out Nozaki's intentions, Nogi captures and interrogates Tojo, who had been ordered by Nozaki to carry out a cover-up operation. Tojo's confession confirms Nogi's suspicions. Tojo, a valuable hacker, starts working under Beppan supervision. In Balka, Beki's funeral is taking place, monitored by several intelligence agencies around the world. Nogi receives a note from Nozaki through Genghis. In the note, Nozaki is apologizing and quotes Laozi: "The net of heaven is vast and wide, but nothing escapes it". The Beppan, incapable of overlooking Nozaki's actions, which put their team in peril, brings Chief Sano from the Tokyo Metro Police for questioning.

Five years before, while Nozaki was stationed at the Japanese embassy in Beijing conducting intelligence activities, he was working with his agents Zhang Jingshi and Liu Mingxuan in a plan to keep track of the movements of high-ranking North Korean officials. This was the point of entry of Nozaki into Xinxi, according to Sano, who revealed the plan to Nogi. Nozaki believed Zhang was a double agent, but he trusted Liu. Liu defied Nozaki's warnings and went alone in search of the official identified as being in Beijing. Liu was captured by the North Koreans and news of his whereabouts was sent to Nozaki through the Ministry of Foreign Affairs. Fan Linxing was already part of Xinxi at that time and witnessed when Nozaki received a photo of a disfigured Liu, who had supposedly died. Fan invites Nozaki to become part of Xinxi, telling him that had he had connections with other intelligence agencies, Liu would have not died. In the present, Liu appears in front of Nozaki. He resents Japan for leaving him behind, but his feelings of unending love for Nozaki have increased after learning that Nozaki had tried to rescue him.

Nozaki is forced by Liu to reveal his sources when he calls for a beaten Drum to be brought to the cell room. Nogi continues searching for Korosu and the others, and investigating, with Jamin's help, who reacts when seeing Suzuki from the Security Department on a photo. With information relayed by Nozaki, Nogi gets from AI Hayato the location of the missing team. Sakurai has lost faith and is planning to poison the missing members, but it is Nagano who pushes Nogi to continue looking for them. Nokor and Nogi talk, securing a rescue team from the Tent.

Nogi receives an ultimatum from Sakurai: either he saves the team before June 10, or she'll continue with the poisoning plan. Nogi doesn't reveal to Kaoru his motive to travel. The rescue team gathers in Balka, with the Tent team. Shinjo, thought dead, enters the room. It is revealed that it was a plan taken under suggestion from Nogi and cooperation from the local police. With everyone who is participating in the room, they start training with a mock–up of Shaki Castle. Toko and Ohta travel to Azerbaijan, near Gorbado, to aide with the hacking intelligence. In Gorbado, Liu, who has been indirectly torturing Nozaki leaving him without water or food for 9 days, acts like his saviour, by offering him some water.

In preparation for the raid, Nokor goes to Orko Village and speaks with the village chief, offering to pay the townspeople if they let them carry out their operations without reporting them. He shows the chief a bag with 15 million. After reaching an agreement, Nogi learns that Fan had contacted Suzuki. They decide to move up the operations by one day. Xinxi had been investigating a nuclear fusion technology possessed by Elisha Mamadov. Liu had found out that there was a link between the Tent and Mamadov and was looking to find out what it was. When he learned that Nozaki was taken to Gorbado, it was his opportunity to interrogate him about his knowledge about the Tent. And his chance to move up in the Xinxi ladder. Holding him in an interrogation room, Liu starts interrogating Nozaki, when he notices the surveillance cameras, cutting the cables to them and making Fan angry. Convincing her that he could get more information out of him if they were alone, Fan orders her group to move Nozaki back to the cell room. Fan later tells Liu that they would be going to Tailan Gulieva's place, where he had Mamadov. Gulieva confirms that Nozaki knows all about the Tent, including who its leader is.

Tojo and Ohta give the team the green light to continue, as the village surveillance team would leave for six minutes. Realizing that the laser simulation was different from the real thing, F, taking over Nogi's body, tells Chocky that he would have to climb the wall instead. After having his shoes improved with some anti–slip tape, and encouragement from Shinjo, he gets to the other side, but is encountered by the castle's surveillance team, which had returned early. Chocky, paralized with feat, shoots at them. The plan continues and the team rescue the missing team, except for Wada, who was killed by the kidnappers. F asks Nokor to cover them, as the castle guards are about to arrive. With the search team having completed the mission, F signals Shinjo and Nokor. Shinjo blows up Xinxi's cars parked out front, while Nokor shoots at the guards coming out the gates. Tong informs Li, one of Korosu's captors, that all comunications have been cut, and while they were talking, Tong was shot on the head. Nokor informs F that two of the three captors have been confirmed and one dealt with. As F and the group were leaving, Li had them followed. Tojo was in charge of stopping them, but failed stopping one car and one motorcycle, making F cry out in frustration. Meanwhile, in Gorbado, Nozaki was being questioned by Tailan. Nozaki reveals everything about the Tent, about Beki and, when he named Jamin, Drum reacted, but Nozaki stopped him. It was enough for Gulieva to notice and put things together: Jamin was Elisha's daughter Prisha, who was taken to Balka by Beki when she was an infant. And now, she was in Japan.

The chase continues. Tojo manages to time the next point, but both the car and the motorcycle stop before reaching it. Even so, the explosion blows the car up, making it crash against the motorcycle. Li, barely alive, is shot pointblank by F. Nokor, noticing the difference, questions who he is, and F tells him he is his other brother. In Xinxi, there are problems to identify Nogi's team's location. However, Li's could be predicted. Fan ordered information on private jet arrivals and departures, she learned about Chocky's arrival and ordered Liu to request the Gorbado government a checkpoint to stop him from leaving. Nogi and the team are characterized as Chinese workers. Tashiro, a member of Beppan's local sector, facilitated F with the buses to reach the airport. Police checkpoints are already set, and there are delays in movement. Tojo revealed that the original buses were tampered with and were already taken to be fixed, so F calculated they should be there in close to 10 minutes. As their bus is about to reach the checkpoint, and the police boarding it, Nogi takes over. All seems to go under plan, when suddenly a black vehicle appeared with a siren blaring, and soldiers surrounded the bus, guns drawn. Korosu identifies Zhou as the one from the vehicle, so Nogi orders everyone to get their guns ready. He leaves everyone on the bus under Nokor's care, and walks off the bus. Zhou, pointing his gun at Nogi, gets his own head pointed at by Chingis. Chingis fires a warning shot at Zhou. Nokor orders Chucky to cover his face to not be identified. The bus pushes an old woman's car that got stuck in front of them. Chingis and Nogi return to the bus. The police can't follow them because Chingis took their keys off. Chingis tells Nogi and Nokor that it is his duty to protect the great Nogon Beki's sons. Nogi gets Chocky to talk to the pilot and the jet ready. Chingis blocks the police from reaching the plane putting himself in harm's way. Nokor warned him that Fan was communicating with the police and ordered them to shoot him, so Chingis placed himself behind Inspector Zeki. F, seeing that Nogi's plan was failing, took over again and teased Fan calling her pathetic and stupid. As the jets started moving, F told Fan that they had revealed everything about Xinxi to Japan, and that the Western countries would retaliate if there was an attack by them. Chingis smiled as he saw his friends' planes take off.

Chingis is taken into custody. Nokor, through his contact with the Balka Ministry of Justice, gets him freed. Chingis, tracked under Nogi's orders, hides outside where Nozaki and Drum are held by Liu, who continues to tease Drum with Nozaki. Drum releases himself by force and picks the lock on his cell. Liu, having "moved into" Nozaki's sheet–covered cell, comes out of it, making Drum react. The cell door is ajar and Drum lunges forward, pushing Liu, who fires at him, against Nozaki's cell, uncovering it. Nozaki sees Drum fall "dead". Liu orders the jailers to take Drum to be buried. Chingis digs a barely alive Drum out, and insistently calls Nokor, who relays this to Nogi. Keeping in contact with Chingis about Drum's condition, Nogi sends a team to help Chingis take Drum to a safe place to get attended to. They learn that, before losing conciousness, Drum had mentioned Jamin, making Nokor consider a link to Balka. Nogi and Nokor arrive where Chingis and the others are. As Drum regains conciousness, he sees Nogi and, imagining Liu's face on him, reacts with anger. Drum informs them that Nozaki revealed information about Tent and Elisha, who is being held at Tailan's. Nokor reveals that Adiel was in fact a member of the Tent's elite. Beki and him had gone to Turkey, as the Tent's other mission in Russia had been extended. Nogi reminisces about things related to Jamin, including a series of "family photos". Nokor then reveals that they were false, that Jamin is not Adiel's daughter, but the girl Elisha begged him and Beki to rescue. Only six people knew this fact: Beki, Nokor, Batraka, Piyo, Adiel, and Ali. Adiel had offered to take care of the girl. Beki allowed it only if Adiel renounced to his role in Tent and lived a quiet life. When the others questioned the actions, Drum inadvertently revealed that Beki was still alive, which Nogi and Nokor confirmed. Drum begs the group not to go to Beki's before protecting Jamin, of whom Nozaki had informed Xinxi. F orders everyone out, except for Ohta, and begins making plans with Sakurai. A team is sent into Nogi's place, while Chingis and Nokor enter via a secret back entrance, surprising a sleeping Kaoru and Jamin. Chingis tells them he is on their side, as Nokor tells them he is Adiel's friend. F, having no response from the special ops team, orders them to retreat. But it is too late, as Xinxi takes control and captures the four.

Nogi, with Sakurai's permission, returns home. Strapped with what are later revealed to be fake bombs on his body, Nogi enters the room where the others are held, effectively revealing his hidden persona to Kaoru. F declares to Fan he is willing to make it a suicide mission, taking Jamin with him if he is forced to. Fan's sniper has been already taken down. F kills the agents in the room, then shoots at the communication relay with Fan. Jamin is frightened by F, so Nogi takes over. Nogi frees and apologizes to Jamin for scaring her. Chingis runs after Jamin. Nokor leaves Nogi alone with Kaoru. Nogi tells Kaoru all about his role in Beppan. Kaoru accepts his explanations, but says she needs time to think about her future with him. Kaoru and Jamin are taken to an undisclosed place under Self-Defense Forces surveillance. Nogi, Nokor and Chingis head to Nogi's family home, where they meet with Nogi's uncle. Nokor, looking at one of the photos of the heads of the Nogi family, is told by Hiromichi that that is his grandfather, as he is Beki's son. Then he asks if he can call him nephew, even if there is no blood relation, to which Nokor accepts, his eyes filled with tears at the unexpected words. Nogi thanks his uncle for taking care of his father, whom Hiromichi thought dead, after Nozaki took him there. Nozaki had also revealed to him that Nogi was part of Beppan. Hiromichi assures Nogi no one knows their secrets. Beki, Piyo and Batraka enter the room, to which Chingis immediately steps up and makes a deep reverence to Beki. Beki asks Nogi why he spared their lives, to what Nogi answers he needed them to live to support Nokor in Balka. Furthermore, Nokor needed his father there. Chingis, thankful, tells him that, if it wasn't for Beki, neither he nor his sister would have lived. Asking his uncle to leave, Nogi, with Nokor, asked Beki about Elisha and Prisha (Jamin), with Beki revealing their mission seven years before. Beki confirms that Elisha told Adiel something, but he ignores what was said. After the meeting, the group go to a shrine and when they are about to take a commemorative photo, Nogi receives a positive message from Kaoru. Beki, Batraka and Piyo return to Balka with Nokor under new names, as they were officially and internationally considered dead. Nogi and Korosu go to Tailan's, where Fan, Liu and Nozaki are also there. Nogi had secured funds from Sakurai, assuring her the money would be returned. Fan asked why they were there, to what Tailan answered that a Japanese buyer for the nuclear power information had requested to meet with the people from Xinxi, so he had to summon them. Nogi reveals that he already knew that Xinxi's target was Jamin. Korosu received the information for the transfer, while Jamin's DNA is confirmed as being that of Elisha's daughter. Ohta hacked into the account, leaving only the registration of the transfer, but the money still remaining in Beppan's accounts. Even with Korosu removing the listening devices, Fan and the others were able to listen into Nogi's talk with Elisha. Liu threatened Nogi with killing Nozaki if he didn't consult with Kaoru about the disk. Kaoru said there was a suture mark on Jamin, but after examinations previous her procedure, nothing remained in her. Tailan aprehended Nogi and Korosu, then saying that Xinxi would be the ones getting the data, and that he would take 100 million yuan for the Beppan team. Fan signaled Liu, who shot at Nozaki, excusing himself saying that "his" Xinxi and not Japan would be the owners of the information he had overheard.

Fan taunts the pair. Her plan was to make Beppan be known around Japan. Liu, who also adds to the discussion, is applauded by one of the secretaries, praising him in Chinese. The secretary shoots Tailan, followed by the other secretaries present, then taunting Liu with killing Fan, who he ultimately kills. The man is a member of the Central Special Service, and claims the information for their group, but Nozaki stands up and kills him. Liu celebrates that everything went on plan, and Nozaki asks Nogi if he had seen through his and Liu's plan, to which Nogi agreed. Liu and Nozaki had been investigating the organization with the information gathered by Xinxi. Nogi had AI Hayato track the man and another of the secretaries. The first one was Fu Tianxiang of the Central Special Service, believed to have died 30 years before. The other one was Dmitry Sidanov of Russia, believed to have died 6 years before. Liu had to be shot to remain alive, making it look like it was part of Russia vs Xinxi's fight for Elisha, so Nogi took the gun, wiped Liu's fingerprints and shot in the air and then at Liu, placing the gun on Sidanov. Having Korosu call for an ambulance, Nogi and the others go to Elisha's side to rescue him, but he had hung himself. Korosu mentioned that, knowing Prisha was safe, there was nothing else he could do. They continue to discuss about the disk's whereabouts, and the time when Adiel was missing for 5 days. They thought there had to be a link and the only place that could be would be in Balka, since Nogi had confirmed there was no record of Adiel leaving the country. They walk out of Tailan's mansion and are greeted by Shinjo and others. Nozaki hits Shinjo in the face for fooling him for 2 years. They talk about the mole inside the police, and Nozaki says he had 3 suspects, one of them being Shinjo. Nozaki asks Nogi when he had figured out his relationship to Liu. Nogi tells him that it started during Sano's interrogation when the P300 lie detector reacted to the question of who had Nozaki met 5 years prior. Then, the fact that the guards around Shaki Castle had left, letting them rescue the missing team. And Drum's survival. But the decisive was the message to Chingis. The words on it, as well as the coordinates, could only be given by him, but as he was "captive", Nozaki had to have an accomplice. Nozaki then goes on telling how Liu and Nozaki started working together. Korosu questions why the other members of the team were captured, but not Nogi. Nozaki tells them that, though he and Shinjo are top notch agents, Nogi lacked that special aura that makes intelligence agents unique. That it was difficult for him to discern Nogi's true identity even when they met in Barka. As they continue on their way, Nozaki continues his story on how he had worked with Liu, how he would inform Nogi and the team and how they would get Fan and Xinxi trapped regarding the nuclear power information. Arriving in Barka, they start looking for any spot where Adiel could have hidden the disk, and come up with a cave he had found 5 years after the Tent had been founded. Beki recalls how they hid there after he and his companions were pursued by a Kazakhstani organization and fled into the Ado Desert. Nokor leads the group to the cave, where Beki had placed years before the urns with Akemi's and the dead orphan's ashes. Nogi picks Akemi's up. The others start searching for urns with names like Prisha, Jamin, and Tsuren, Adiel's lover, to see if the disk was in them. Nokor then recalls that Adiel used to leave as the others were wiping the urns and praying in front of them, and stand among the stalactites and stalagmites. Nozaki found a microchip among them. When Korosu tested it, it responded, but the fingerprint key was needed to reveal the information. Jamin and Kaoru arrive at Balka, led by Chingis. Jamin is taken to the computer and, after placing her fingers in the reader, the file opens. Nogi introduces Kaoru as his fianceé, and Kaoru tells Jamin that they want to establish a family with her. Beki asks for permission for Jamin to spend the night so he can tell her stories about Adiel, and Nokor asks for her to visit often. Some days later, back in Japan, Jamin runs over to a sleeping Nogi, but Kaoru, wearing white gloves, presses Jamin, as they are running late for school. At the shrine, there is a red bun, Beppan's signature for trouble.

== Cast ==
=== Main cast ===
- Masato Sakai as Yūsuke Nogi (Energy Development Division 2's Chief) (returning in season 2) (appearing in movie)
- Hiroshi Abe as Mamoru Nozaki (Metropolitan Police Department, Foreign Affairs Inspector) (returning in season 2) (appearing in movie)
- Fumi Nikaido as Kaoru Yuzuki (WHI's Medical Doctor) (returning in season 2) (appearing in movie)

=== Marubishi Corporation ===
- Takaya Sakoda as Isao Yamamoto (Energy Development Division 1's Chief) (season 1). During season 2, hosts TBS Radio spinoff "VIVANT: Villain Conference Room"
- Robin Furuya as Ryō Mizugami (Energy Development Division 2)
- Ai Iinuma as Riho Ohta (Finance Division)
  - Hanaoka Sumire as Riho Ohta (hacker "Blue Walker") (season 2) (appearing in movie)
- Satoshi Hashimoto as Tomohiko Hara (Chief Accountant)
- Enya Ichikawa as Tetsuya Usami (Energy Business Division's General Manager) (returning in season 2)
- Kunito Watanabe as Koji Kawai (Systems Management)
- Fumiyo Kohinata as Toshihiko Nagano (managing director) (returning in season 2) (member of Beppan)

=== Metropolitan Police Department ===
- Ryo Ryusei as Kōtarō Shinjō (Detective, Public Security Bureau; monitor in the Beppan group) (returning in season 2) (appearing in movie)
- Yajuro Bando as Yūtarō Sano (Director, Public Security Bureau) (returning in season 2)
- Kenta Uchino as Shō Suzuki (Detective, Public Security Bureau) (season 2 ep 15 (5))
- Gaku Hamada as Shōta Tōjō (Detective, Cybercrime Division) (returning in season 2) (appearing in movie)
- Shunsuke Tanaka as Shunsaku Wakui (season 2) (appearing in movie)
- ja as Kiichi Morita

=== Beppan ===
- Tori Matsuzaka as Shun Kurosu (Agent, engineer as cover job) (returning in season 2) (appearing in movie)
- Midoriko Kimura as Satomi Sakurai (Commander) (returning in season 2) (appearing in movie)
- Emisaburō Ichikawa as Akitoshi Takada (Agent, bureaucrat as cover job) (returning in season 2)
- Ryō Tamakias Mizuki Hirose (Agent, system engineer as cover job) (returning in season 2)
- Yūsuke Hirayama as Mitsugu Wada (Agent, salesman as cover job) (returning in season 2)
- Jun Nishiyama as Kazuteru Kumagai (Agent, engineer as cover job) (returning in season 2)
- Minami Takayama, as AI Hayato (Beppan's supercomputer) (voice) (season 2) (appearing in movie)

=== Nogi's family ===
- Koji Yakusho as Suguru Nogi (Yūsuke's father at present day), also Nogōn Beki (see "Tent")
  - Kento Hayashi as Suguru Nogi (Yūsuke's father in younger days) (returning in season 2)
- Jun Inoue as Hiromichi Nogi (Yūsuke's uncle at present day) (returning in season 2)
- Rin Takanashi as Akemi Nogi (Yūsuke's mother in younger days)

=== Republic of Balka ===
- Takashi Yamanaka as Ali Khan (GLF's CEO) (returning in season 2) (appearing in movie)
- Ganbold Erkhembayar as Al-Zaer (Terrorist organization's leader)
- Khongorzul Nandin-Erdene as Jamīn (a girl with congenital heart defects)
  - Honma Sae as Jamin (season 2)
- Khatanzorig Tsaschikher as Adiel (Jamīn's father) (returning in season 2) (appearing in movie)
- Barslkhagva Batbold as Genghis (Police officer) (returning in season 2) (appearing in movie)
- Rin Ma as Saihan Ilya (Nurse)
- Drum Tomisakae as Drum (Person that helped Mamoru Nozaki) (returning in season 2) (appearing in movie)
  - Megumi Hayashibara as the voice of the translation app he uses (returning in season 2) (appearing in movie)
- Rei Dan as Eiko Nishioka (Japanese Ambassador to Balkan Republic)
- Tōru Baba as Govi, CEO of Belair Kosan Corp. and Nokor's business partner (season 1). During season 2, hosts TBS Radio spinoff "VIVANT: Villain Conference Room"
- Yamato Kochi as Wanizu, a former high-ranking official of the Republic of Balka (season 1). During season 2, hosts TBS Radio spinoff "VIVANT: Villain Conference Room"

=== Tent ===
- Koji Yakusho as Nogon Beki (the leader of Tent), also Suguru Nogi (see "Nogi's family") (returning in season 2) (appearing in movie)
- Kazunari Ninomiya as Nokor (Nogōn Beki's adopted son and the subleader of Tent) (returning in season 2) (appearing in movie)
- Mitsuo Yoshihara as Piyo (leading staff)
- Yasufumi Hayashi as Batraka (leading staff, the representative of PMSC Y2K, a private military company by Tent)
- Hajime Inoue as Shichi (member) (returning in season 2)
- Haruka Uchimura as Mata (member) (returning in season 2)

=== Xinxi ===
- Kyoko Miyashita as Fan Linxing (Season 2 ep14(4)-), former director of the Chinese Ministry of Public Security, currently in charge of "Xinxi", Chinese version of Beppan
- Masato Sakai as Liu Mingxuan, a junior agent under Nozaki during the Beijing case 5 years prior (season 2 ep 16 (6)-)
- Mitsuomi Takahashi as Zhang Jingshi, a junior agent under Nozaki during the Beijing case 5 years prior (season 2 ep 16 (6))

=== Others ===
- Martin Starr as Sam (CIA) (season 1)
- Charles Glover as Robert (FBI) (season 1)
- Hideo Kojima as Police Commissioner Ken Watanuki (cameo) (season 2, ep 11 (1)) (Note: The video game producer's appearance was CG altered due to looking too young for the role.)
- Natsumi Tsunoda as a Balkan waiting in line at the airport (season 2, ep 11 (1)) (Note: the 2024 Summer Olympics women's 48kg judo category gold medalist appears as special collaboration with the TBS Asia Games broadcast, of which she is an athlete ambassador)
- Akari Kitō as newscaster (season 2 ep 11 (1))
- Natsuki Hanae as news anchor (season 1 Ep 6, season 2 ep 11 (1))
- Tomokazu Seki as voice on the police radio (season 2 ep 11 (1))
- Ai Otsuka as the soldier who takes Sano to the AI Hayato room (season 2 ep 15(5))
- Ohm–Tanapak as Chokki Thepanit (season 2) (appearing in movie)
- Manaf Dadashov as Elisha Mamadov (season 2)
- Ryu Kohata as Li Mingze (season 2)
- Lingling as Zhou Haoran (season 2)
- Shungo Takasaki as Shen Junyu (season 2)
- Hiroshi Higashi as Tong Torfan (season 2)
- Pattarapol Kantapoj as Gerun (season 2)
- Rei Yamada as Kumiko Tashiro (season 2)
- Gulnar Yunusova as Filza (season 2)
- Shahriyar Abilovj as Romar (season 2)
- Ruslan Huseynov as Natik (season 2)
- Parviz Mammadzada as Isaac (season 2)
- Mirze Aghabayli as Tailan Gulieva (season 2)

== Controversies ==
=== Director Fukuzawa's power harrasment allegations ===
On July 14, 2026, Shukan Josei reported that director Fukuzawa was accused of power harassment by a young staff member that was on site. Vivant is scheduled to air its second season starting on the 26. According to an interview on Sponichi, a representative from TBS said that the company had acknowledged that there had been behaviour that constituted power harassment, and that they were taking strict actions regarding it. As for which actions, the representative refrained from answering at the moment, but said that Fukuzawa was temporarily not appearing on site. As for implications regarding the program, the representative said that there are no changes in schedule.

=== Reception in China ===
On 25 October 2026, China Central Television (CCTV) criticised the second season, saying it "deliberately smears China" and "reverses black and white" by transferring atrocities committed by the Imperial Japanese Army during the Second Sino-Japanese War — including finger amputation and seppuku — onto Chinese agents in the drama. CCTV described the framing as "cognitive poisoning" (认知投毒) and argued that packaged hostility is more dangerous than overt propaganda. The remarks were carried by Lianhe Zaobao, Yahoo News, TVBS and other outlets in mainland China, Taiwan and Hong Kong, and the topic briefly topped Weibo's trending list, with some mainland viewers calling for a boycott.

On 28 October 2026, Global Times and CCTV criticized the drama for smearing China's name in showing Chinese agents using torture against the protagonists.

On October 29, 2026, Sanrio cut ties with show after concluding that the drama went against the company’s core values.

On 13 November 2026, ThinkChina published an analysis by Yi Jina describing the dispute as an "online China-Japan proxy war", reporting that Chinese foreign ministry spokesman Guo Jiakun said forces in Japan were using cultural products to vilify China, and that the Chinese defence ministry released a video titled "Who's Turning History Upside Down?" on 1 November.

== Collaborations ==
In June 2026, a collaboration between the drama and Sanrio was announced, with Sanrio characters dressed up like the characters in the drama. A pop–up store was opened in July at Tokyo Station. On October 29, 2026, Sanrio ended collaboration with TBS after being criticized by China.

In July 2026, Koikeya released a Vivant–themed pair of potato chips packages, named after the main protagonists. “Nogi’s Seaweed Salt” and “Nozaki’s Kebab” were available from July 27 in convenience stores, and later in supermarkets. To celebrate the launch of the special version packaging, an SNS campaign giveaway was held with a one–week limited deadline. In October, the brand had a second collaboration package released under the names "VIVANT Potato Chips Beppan Manju" and "VIVANT Potato Chips Xinxi Mala Chicken" in collaboration with the TBS series' second season, with the packaging showing the pink bun from the Beppan group, and characters Han and Liu from the Xinxi group. Their release was on November 2 in convenience stores and from the 9th in supermarkets.

It was announced that in 2026 the watchmaker Seiko would collaborate with the broadcast by releasing a special limited edition "Seiko x Vivant" wristwatch to celebrate the start of the second season of the drama. The face of the watch has both the symbols of the Nogi family/Tent group as the one from the Beppan.

In October 2026, fashion brand Culture Supply released a series of t–shirts with the images of the so–called Villain's Meeting Room members, sold via ZozoTown and TBS Shop.

In July and October 2026, Japanese fashion brand Ships released a series of clothing which included the "Vivant" logo that can be displayed only by folding it, as well as other items. The items were released through the brand's site, ZozoTown and TBS Shop.

== Spinoff ==
- VIVANT: Villain Conference Room (VIVANT 悪役会議室, VIVANT akuyaku kaigijitsu) (TBS Radio, Vivant 2nd season) (Yamato Kochi (Wanizu), Takaya Sakoda (Isao Yamamoto) and Tōru Baba (Govi), as their characters, host the program where they share immediate reactions and theories regarding the main series' plot developments)

== Special Events ==
- "Vivant Premium Summer Party", Yoyogi National Stadium, August 23, 2026, held with 11 cast members

== Accolades ==
Awards and nominations
Award	Year	Category	Nominee(s) / work(s)	Result	Ref.
Asia Contents Awards & Global OTT Awards	2024	Best Creative	Vivant	Nominated	
Tokyo Drama Awards	2024	Best Drama Series	Vivant	Won	
