= Blunt-Force Ethnic Credibility =

"Blunt-Force Ethnic Credibility" is an essay written by Vietnamese-American lawyer and writer Som-Mai Nguyen, published in the second issue of Astra Magazine on June 30, 2022. The essay addresses the tendency of Vietnamese diasporic writers to utilize cultural and linguistic tropes to inappropriately signal cultural authenticity and gain “ethnic credibility," as well as how Vietnamese literature is poorly treated in Anglopheric literary circles.

== Synopsis ==
Nguyen critiques the tendency of diasporic literature to superficially use non-English words and exploit linguistic coincidences (most often near-homophones) in tonal languages like Vietnamese. She writes that these "in-group sleights of hand, smugly announcing, without real evidence, that the author has exotic cultural knowledge the outsider cannot fathom."

She critiques poet and novelist Ocean Vuong (among other writers) for claiming “unearned authority” as an ambassador for the Vietnamese language to (primarily white) readers with no knowledge of Vietnamese.

== Reception ==
"Blunt-Force Ethnic Credibility" was characterized as a "polemical article" by Kaya Press. In an interview with the Chicago Review of Books, novelist E. Y. Zhao describes Nguyen's essay as "eloquent" commentary on how "[a]rt can certainly also cave to [white audiences] and make caricatures of minority communities." Dun Jian Chin of The College Hill Independent commended Nguyen's essay as "a stunning critique" and "reproach of one of Asian America’s most celebrated cultural icons addresses an ironic contradiction in translation[.]"

Nguyen's essay was curated by Koundinya Dhulipalla, an artist and lecturer at University College London's Slade School of Fine Art, for gardengardengarden, an online library of essays. In 2022, Terry Nguyen of Dirt Media listed "Blunt-Force Ethnic Credibility" among his favorite essays from Astra Magazine's archive following the publication's closure.

== Influence ==
Numerous writers of the Asian diaspora have noted the influence of Nguyen's essay in discourse surrounding literary representation and the publishing industry, particularly for its commentary on self-exoticism and linguistic tropes. The Asian American Writers' Workshop singles "Blunt-Force Ethnic Credibility" as a reference for a "critique of a persistent, underexamined issue in our literature or literary community" for their online literary magazine,The Margins. Poets of the Vietnamese diaspora have produced creative work in response to Nguyen's concept of "blunt-force ethnic credibility," such as Steven Duong and Teline Trần.

Summer Kim Lee, an assistant professor at University of California, Los Angeles, cites Nguyen's concept of "blunt-force ethnic credibility" in her 2025 book Spoiled: Asian American Hostility and the Damage of Repair published by Duke University Press. In the chapter "Staying In," Lee recapitulates “blunt-force ethnic credibility” as "the wielding of authenticity" through "autoerotic gestures" often employed by "artists of color" like Vuong and Mitski to "disclose the self through suspended narratives of non-encounters with others[.]"

American writer and critic Andrea Long Chu borrows concepts from "Blunt-Force Ethnic Credibility" and frequently references Nguyen in her review of Vuong's novel The Emperor of Gladness for Vulture.

Nguyen's essay has been discussed at UC Berkeley School of Law.
