= Heaven (Kawakami novel) =

Book by Mieko Kawakami

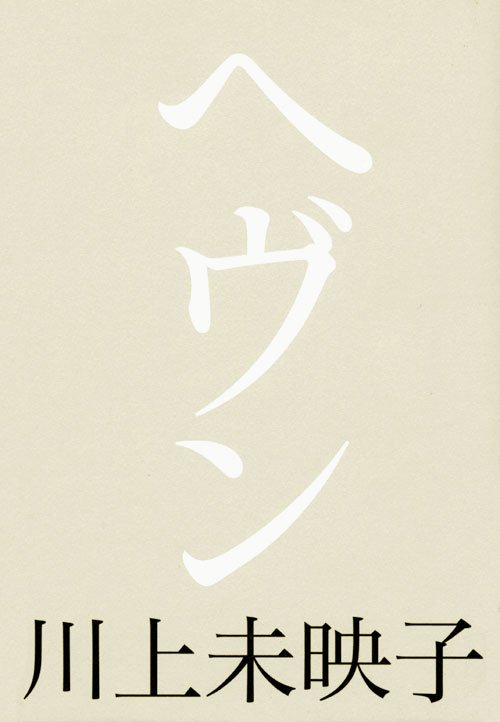
- First edition cover (Kodansha, 2009)
- Author: Mieko Kawakami
- Original title: ヘヴン
- Translator: Sam Bett; David Boyd
- Language: Japanese
- Publisher: Kodansha
- Publication date: 2 September 2009
- Publication place: Japan
- English publication date: 2021
- Media type: Print
- Pages: 248
- ISBN: 978-4-06-215772-8
- OCLC: 436079069

Heaven (ヘヴン, Hevun) is a 2009 novel by Mieko Kawakami. Its English translation, released in 2021 and published by Europa Editions, had Sam Bett and David Boyd as the translators. This is the second book by Kawakami to be translated into English.

The title refers to a painting in the story which one of the characters, a girl named Kojima, gave a new name.

== Background ==
Kawakami, on her personal website, cited Thus Spoke Zarathustra as having given her ideas for writing this book.

== Content ==
The story is set in Japan in 1991. The narrator is a 14-year-old boy who has a right eye that aims in a different direction from his left eye, and who is bullied by other male students. Other characters refer to him as "Eyes" (In Japanese ロンパリ, Ronpari, a reference to one eye looking at London and the other at Paris). Nadja Spiegelman of The New York Times describes "Eyes" as a flat character. The work does not reveal his legal name. The first chapter documents the bullying he receives.

A girl named Kojima (コジマ), also 14, has the nickname "Hazmat" and receives bullying from female students. Her mother left her father and married a wealthier man, while her father remained in a poorer background. Kojima seeks to befriend Eyes, leaving notes for him to read. Kojima chooses not to take baths, has clothing that is not clean, and keeps her hair in an unkempt state. Initially, Eyes and Kojima believe that they are counteracting their bullying by allowing it to happen to them. Kojima believes that receiving bullying helps purify her, and gives her meaning, something the author of the book disagrees with and characterizes as harming Kojima. Lily Meyer of National Public Radio (NPR) states that Kawakami has a sympathetic view of Kojima. Due to her affinity to her father, Kojima adopts the appearance of a poor person, and the book reveals that after her mother became wealthy, Kojima stopped taking baths. In latter parts of the book she starves herself. She disagrees with Eyes's idea of getting surgery to correct his condition. Thu-Huong Ha in The Washington Post describes Kojima's view of bullying as "kind of religious, moralistic". Meyer states that Kojima is similar to Franny Glass, and that she drags down Eyes, being unable to provide "true friendship or solidarity".

Ninomiya (二ノ宮), who serves as the lead bully, has the highest grades of all of the students in the class. Merve Emre describes Ninomiya as "handsome, popular". Momose (百瀬), who serves as Ninomiya's assistant, tells Eyes that bullies act due to the fact they are able to do so. He describes Momose's view as "nihilistic".

The bullying increases in intensity as the plot continues. After the speech, Eyes rejects Kojima's beliefs and decides to confront a tormenter.

Due to the time period, the work does not feature cyberbullying.

== Reception ==
In 2010 the work was awarded the Art Encouragement Prize for New Artists and the Murasaki Shikibu Prize. The English translation was shortlisted for the International Booker Prize in 2022.

=== Reviews ===
Spiegelman stated that the English version is "impeccably translated", and she described the ending as "breathtaking".

Ha stated that parts of the book appear to be like "torture porn".

Kirkus Reviews describes it as "an unexpected classic", with the writing being "startlingly graceful".

Emre stated that the work "shows us how to think about morality as an ongoing, dramatic activity", something that is the "real magic" of the work.

Meyer wrote that Heaven is "simpler" than Breasts and Eggs (the English version of Kawakami's Natsu Monogatari) and that it is "a raw, painful, and tender portrait of adolescent misery" that "is very likely to make you cry".

== See also ==
- Ijime
