= Pink and Gray =

- Poster

Japanese name
- Kanji: ピンクとグレー
Transcriptions
- Revised Hepburn: Pinku to gurē
- Directed by: Isao Yukisada
- Release date: January 9, 2016
- Running time: 119 minutes
- Country: Japan
- Language: Japanese
- Box office: US$4.2 million (Japan)

Pink and Gray (ピンクとグレー, Pinku to gurē) is a 2016 Japanese drama film directed by Isao Yukisada. It was released in Japan on January 9, 2016. It is based on the homonymous novel by Japanese idol and author Shigeaki Kato.

== Plot ==
The film opens with the suicide of Shingo Suzuki and the subsequent discovery of his body by his best friend, Daiki Kawada, who informs their mutual friend Sari Ishikawa before he reports the event to the authorities. The film then cuts to fourteen years earlier, on the day Daiki first met Shingo.

Coming from the Kansai region, Daiki has to adjust his life when his family decide to move to rural Saitama Prefecture. He befriends locals Shingo and Sari, also known as "Gocchi" and "Sally", who in turn nickname him "Riba-chan". Sally eventually has to move away just as she and Daiki are becoming close to each other. Shingo in the meantime experiences a tragedy when his ballerina older sister, Yui, is fatally injured during a performance.

Daiki and Shingo move to Tokyo after high school graduation and are scouted by a modeling agency, which introduces them to the showbiz world. They reunite with Sally and choose to live next door to her. As time goes on, it is apparent that Shingo, who adopts the stage name "Rengo Shiraki", is the more talented of the duo. The two friends begin to drift apart as Daiki accuses Shingo of distancing himself from his friends in favor of the life of a celebrity. Eventually, they separate and have no contact for three years, during which Daiki and Sally become a couple, until their high school reunion. The two have a drink and exchange each other a lighter. Shingo promises that he will soon make Daiki famous; in exchange, he wants Daiki to take care of Sally. As he is drunk, Daiki accepts the promise but does not remember it the next day. To his horror, he finds out that Shingo fulfills the promise by committing suicide and passing his identity to Daiki.

It is revealed that all previous events of the film are a film within a film (symbolized by the film switching from color to black and white), based on an autobiography the real Daiki, whose actual name is Dai Kawatori, wrote after the real Shingo's death. The Shingo of the film is played by Dai himself, while "Daiki" and "Sally" are played by actors Ryo Naruse and Rei Mikami, respectively. Dai has been suffering from the burden of carrying Shingo's persona and the showbiz world in general. He gets into trouble when he has brawl with Naruse when he finds out that the latter photographed him kissing Mikami after a one-night stand and gave the result to Sally; to exit out of the controversy, Dai quits from the persona altogether.

Dai returns to Saitama to meet with Shingo's mother, who gives him a tape recorded just before Yui's fatal performance. He is shocked to find that the event was not an accident: Yui had considered a suicide pact with Shingo, with whom she apparently had an incestuous relationship, and that Shingo's suicide, which happened on the same date as Yui's, was a way to fulfill it. Dai visits Shingo's apartment and tries to hang himself, but fails. Shingo's spirit appears and confirms what the tape shows, saying that Dai may not fully understand it. As the two hug, the film returns to color.

The film ends with Dai running towards a billboard memorializing Shingo. He throws Shingo's lighter towards it and says "Take that".

== Cast ==
- Yuto Nakajima as Dai Kawatori/"Shingo Suzuki"
- Masaki Suda as Ryo Naruse/"Daiki Kawada"
- Kaho as Rei Mikami/"Sari Ishikawa"
- Yukino Kishii as Sari Ishikawa
- Yūya Yagira as Shingo Suzuki
- Ryoko Kobayashi as Yui Suzuki
- Tetsuya Chiba as Koizumi

== Reception ==
On its opening weekend in Japan the film grossed ¥102,127,000 and was seventh placed in admissions, with 76,759. On its second weekend, it was eight in gross, with US$515,175 and ninth in admissions. As of February 7, 2016, the film had grossed US$4.2 million in Japan.
