= Kunie Iwahashi =

Japanese novelist

Iwahashi Kunie
- 岩橋邦枝
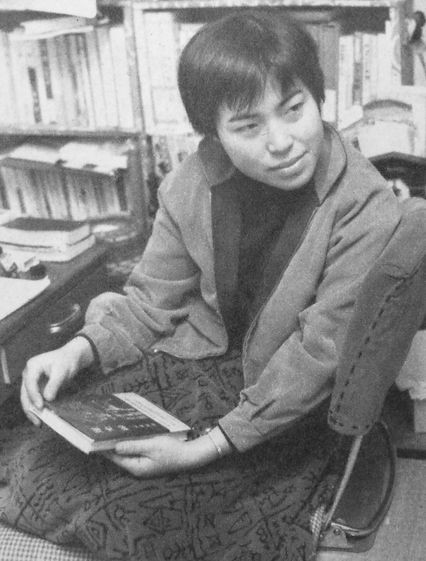
- Born: October 10, 1934
- Died: June 11, 2014
- Occupation: Writer

Kunie Iwahashi (岩橋 邦枝, Iwahashi Kunie; October 10, 1934 – June 11, 2014) was a Japanese novelist. She was considered "the female Shintaro Ishihara".

== Biography ==
Born Kunie Nemoto (邦枝根本), Iwahashi was born in Hiroshima. Her mother and father were both teachers and Christians. The family evacuated from Hiroshima to Saga, Kyushu two months before the atomic bombing of Hiroshima in 1945.

Iwahashi's career began when she gained attention for her writing while attending Ochanomizu Women's College. Her short story "Gyakukoosen" was one of these early works. It was adapted into a movie by the Nikkatsu film studio. Iwahashi graduated in 1957 with a degree in pedagogical sociology. The same year, she was employed as a special feature writer for a magazine.

=== Personal life ===
She married in 1957 and had one daughter. Iwahashi's husband died of cancer in 1983.

== Awards ==
- 1982 - Taiko Hirabayashi Prize for the short story collection Asai Nemuri
- 1986 - New Artist Award for the novel Hanryo
- 1992 - Women's Prize for Literature for the novel Ukihashi
- 1994 - Nitta Jirou Prize for her biography of Hasegawa Shigure
- 2012 - Murasaki Shikibu Prize for her biography of Nogami Yaeko

== Bibliography ==
Japanese title	Reading	English title	Publish Date	Publisher
逆光線 (short story collection)	Gyakukoosen	Counter-lights	1956	Mikasashobo
静かなみじかい午後 (short story collection)	Shizukana mijikai gogo	A Brief Quiet Afternoon	1976	Kawadeshobo
浅い眠り (short story collection)	Asai nemuri	A Light Sleep	1982	Kodansha
真夏日 (short story collection)	Manatsubi	Midsummer Days	1984	Kodansha
愛と反逆 近代女性史を創った女たち (biographies)	Ai to hangyaku: kindai josei shi o tsukutta onna tachi	Love and Rebellion: Women who made History	1984	Kodansha
伴侶 (novel)	Hanryo	Life Companion	1985	Shinchosha
中空に (short story collection)	Nakazora ni	In Mid-Air	1987	Kodansha
迷鳥 (short story collection)	Meichoo	Birds at a Loss	1988	Kodansha
浮橋 (novel)	Ukihashi	A Floating Bridge	1992	Kodansha
