= Breasts and Eggs =

Novel by Mieko Kawakami

- First edition cover (Bungeishunjū, 2019)
- Author: Mieko Kawakami
- Original title: Natsu Monogatari (夏物語)
- Translators: Sam Bett; David Boyd
- Language: Japanese
- Published: March/April 2019 in Bungakukai
- Publisher: Bungeishunjū
- Publication date: 11 July 2019 (hardcover); 3 August 2021 (paperback)
- Publication place: Japan
- English publication date: 7 April 2020 (Europa Editions); 10 June 2021 (Picador)
- Media type: Print (hardcover and paperback), e-book
- Pages: 552 pp. (hardcover); 656 pp. (paperback)
- ISBN: 978-4-16-391054-3 (hardback); 978-4-16-791733-3 (paperback)

Breasts and Eggs (Japanese: 夏物語, Hepburn: Natsu Monogatari; lit. 'Summer Stories') is a novel by Mieko Kawakami, published by Bungeishunjū in July 2019. It features a completely rewritten version of Kawakami's 2008 novella Chichi to Ran (乳と卵; lit. 'Breasts and Eggs'), but uses the same characters and settings. An English translation was published in 2020, under the original novella's translated title of Breasts and Eggs. It is a completely different work from the novella, which has not been translated into English. The novel received the 73rd Mainichi Publication Culture Award.

== Plot ==
The novel is divided in two parts and is narrated by Natsuko Natsume (夏目 夏子, Natsume Natsuko), an aspiring writer in Tokyo. In the first part, Natsuko's sister, Makiko (巻子), and her 12-year-old daughter, Midoriko (緑子), arrive in Tokyo from Osaka. Makiko has come to Tokyo seeking a clinic for breast augmentation. Midoriko has not spoken to her mother in six months. Midoriko's journal entries are interspersed and contain her thoughts about becoming a woman and recognising the changes in her body. In the second part, set years later, Natsuko contemplates becoming a mother and the options open to her as an older single woman in Japan.

== Publication ==
In 2019, Kawakami published the two-part novel Natsu Monogatari (夏物語). The first half of Natsu Monogatari is a completely rewritten version of the original 2008 novella Chichi to Ran. The second half is a continuation of the narrative. It is considered a sequel to the original novella, using the same characters and settings. The first half was originally published in the March 2019 issue of Bungakukai. The second half was published in the April 2019 issue of Bungakukai.

=== English translation ===
It was translated into English by Sam Bett and David Boyd, but was published under the title of Breasts and Eggs, a translation of the original novella's title. Bett and Boyd's translation was published in the United States by Europa Editions on 7 April 2020. It was published in the United Kingdom by Picador on 20 August 2020.

== Critical reception ==
=== English translation ===
Kirkus Reviews criticised the "flat" English translation, writing that Kawakami's writing style is "lost on Anglophone readers, and her frank talk about class and sexism and reproductive choice is noteworthy primarily within the context of Japanese literary culture."

Publishers Weekly praised the "bracing and evocative" narrative of the novel's first part, but felt the second part faltered into an "overlong and chatty" narrative.

Sarah Chihaya, in The New York Review of Books, said that "Reading Mieko Kawakami's novel Breasts and Eggs, one experiences the pain of women coming to terms with what they do and don't want, almost too acutely. The book's narrator rejects the conventional desires a woman is supposed to have, yet she cannot or will not say what she might want in their stead—a refusal that suggests not just ennui but something more provocative."

Alina Cohen, in Observer, said that Kawakami's structure might be hard to follow: "Yet the ending is hardly tidy. The entire book is shaggy, and readers seeking neat closure should stay away. Kawakami leans into her digressive structure, trusting that if her narrator is singular and compelling enough, the reader will follow her wherever she goes." However, she also says that such a structure is to the benefit of Kawakami's world in which there are many questions but few answers: "This structure also enjoys a strange resonance with Kawakami's motifs. There are many ways to be a woman, and many paths are worth wandering until, suddenly, they're not."

Holly Williams, writing for The Guardian, remarked firstly on Kawakami's own voice: "Her writing is sometimes beguilingly strange and peppered with evocative imagery ('sunlight pinched our skin'; strips of cloud are like 'marks left by a tired finger')." Regarding the translation itself, however, she said that "David Boyd's translation seems to reflect Kawakami's smoother control over her material, although there's some heavy-handed exposition and the curiously detached Natsuko doesn't always make for a thrilling narrator [...] But it can also be flat, thickened and slowed by banal repetitions in Sam Bett's less-than-invigorating translation."

Katie Kitamura, reviewing the novel for The New York Times, began first with a reflection on Haruki Murakami's impact on the Japanese literary scene: "For decades, Haruki Murakami defined contemporary Japanese literature for the Anglophone reader [...] But in the decades since the publication of those novels, Murakami's tropes haven't always aged well. In particular, his depictions of women have seemed, at least to some of us, troublingly thin." Locating Kawakami within a new generation of Japanese women writers, Kitamura said that "unlike her forebear, Kawakami writes with a bracing lack of sentimentality, particularly when describing the lives of women." Furthermore, she lauded the book's tackling of difficult and intimate subjects pertaining to women: "Kawakami writes with unsettling precision about the body—its discomforts, its appetites, its smells and secretions. And she is especially good at capturing its longings, those in this novel being at once obsessive and inchoate, and in one way or another about transformation."

Gayathri Sowrirajan, writing for The Sociological Review, said that "Breasts and Eggs looks at the various moral, practical and bureaucratic factors that need to be accounted for while deciding to bring a new life into the world. It is a sharp critique of biopolitics under neoliberalism [...] The book neither passes judgement on individuals' choices nor gives any solutions to the difficult questions it poses. It will, however, make you confront complex questions about life, identity, love, kinship and death and will stay with you long after you are done reading it, showing the value of fiction for sociology."
