= Yukino Kishii =

Japanese actress

- 岸井 ゆきの
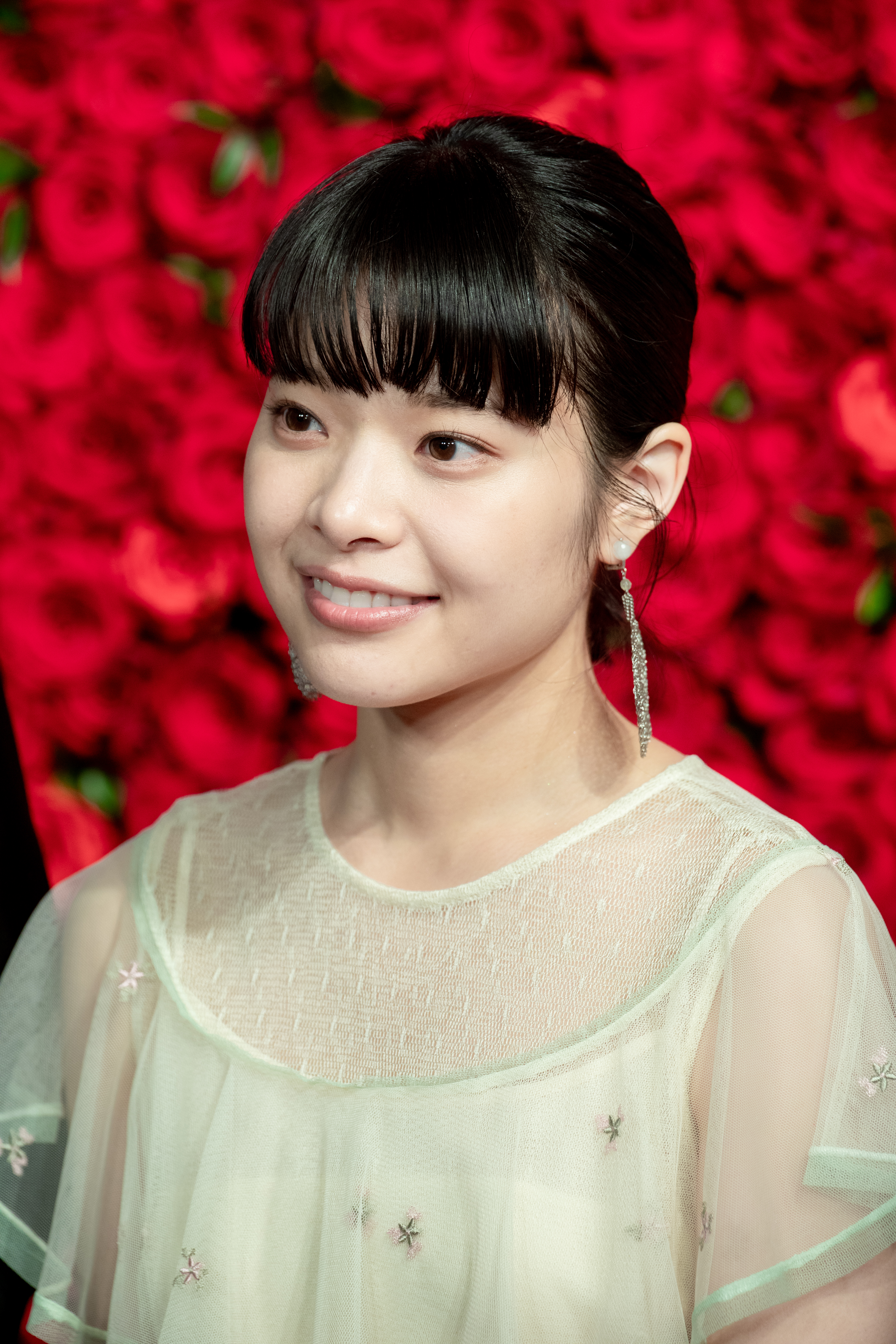
- Kishii at the Tokyo International Film Festival in 2018
- Born: 11 February 1992 (age 34); Kanagawa Prefecture, Japan
- Occupation: Actress
- Years active: 2009–present
- Notable credits: Sanada Maru; Pink and Gray; Goodbye, Grandpa!; Manpuku
- Awards: 39th Yokohama Film Festival Best Newcomer Award

Yukino Kishii (岸井 ゆきの, Kishii Yukino; born February 11, 1992) is a Japanese actress. She has played Taka in the 55th NHK taiga drama Sanada Maru, Sari Ishikawa in the film Pink and Gray, and Taka Kōda in the 99th NHK asadora Manpuku, among numerous other TV and film roles. Her lead performance in the 2017 film Goodbye, Grandpa! earned a Best Newcomer Award at the 39th Yokohama Film Festival.

== Biography ==
Kishii was born in 1992 in Kanagawa Prefecture, Japan. She made her acting debut in 2009 as elementary school student Nana Sakurai in the drama Princess Sara (小公女セイラ, Shōkōjo Seira). After a series of minor film and TV appearances, in 2015 she played the role of Taeko Hakozaki, a girl whose friend falls in love with Taeko's father, in the Kenji Yamauchi film I Love My Friend's Father (友だちのパパが好き, Tomodachi no papa ga suki), as well as the supporting role of Kanako in the TBS drama 99.9 Criminal Lawyer (99.9-刑事専門弁護士-, 99.9: Keiji senmon bengoshi).

The next year Kishii landed several more TV and film roles. Her film roles included Yumika, an ex-girlfriend of a photographer whose rock star subject becomes attracted to her, in Grab the Sun (太陽を掴め, Taiyou o tsukame), and Chieko Matsuda, a teenager whose classmate seeks to impress her by getting a driver's license, in a film adaptation of the manga Moriyamachu Driving School (森山中教習所, Moriyama kyōshūjo). She also appeared in film adaptations of the debut Shigeaki Kato novel Pink and Gray and the Mariko Koike novel Double Life (二重生活, Nijyū seikatsu), and played the role of Taka, Nobushige's third wife, in the 55th NHK taiga drama Sanada Maru.

Kishii's first lead film role came in the 2017 Yukihiro Morigaki film Goodbye, Grandpa! (おじいちゃん、死んじゃったって, Ojiichan, shinjyattatte) as Yoshiko Haruno, the granddaughter of a recently deceased family patriarch. Sarah Ward of Screen Daily described her performance as "especially impressive, her wise-beyond-her-years demeanour helping to flesh out a protagonist largely tasked with observing everyone around her". Kishii's performance in Goodbye, Grandpa! won her a Best Newcomer Award at the 39th Yokohama Film Festival. That same year she played Sumire Michibata in the TBS television series Rental Lovers (レンタルの恋, Rentaru no koi) and Miyuki Asakawa in the Kiyoshi Kurosawa science fiction drama Foreboding on Wowow. In 2018 Kishii took on roles in two NHK dramas: the drama School Lawyer (やけに弁の立つ弁護士が学校でほえる, Yakeni ben no tatsu bengoshi ga gakkō de hoeru), as middle school teacher Shiori Mochozuki; and Manpuku, the 99th NHK asadora, as Taka Kōda. She also appeared in the Fuji TV adaptation of The Count of Monte Cristo.

== Filmography ==
=== Film ===
Year	Title	Role	Notes	Ref.
2015	Her Father, My Lover	Taeko Hakozaki		
2016	Moriyamachu Driving School	Chieko Matsuda		
2016	Double Life	Ayaka		
2016	Pink and Gray	Sari Ishikawa		
2016	Grab the Sun	Yumika		
2016	Somebody's Xylophone			
2017	Goodbye, Grandpa!	Yoshiko Haruno	Lead role	
2018	Just Only Love	Teruko	Lead role	
2019	Strawberry Song	Akemi		
2020	Project Dream: How to Build Mazinger Z's Hangar	Emoto		
2020	State of Emergency		Lead role; anthology film	
2020	Living in the Sky	Aiko		
2021	Homunculus	Mysterious woman		
2021	The Supporting Actors: The Movie	Herself		
2021	99.9 Criminal Lawyer: The Movie	Kanako		
2022	One Day, You Will Reach the Sea	Mana	Lead role	
2022	Dreaming of the Meridian Arc	Toyomi Yasuno / Toyo		
2022	Small, Slow But Steady	Keiko	Lead role	
2022	God Seeks in Return	Yuri Kawai		
2022	Everything Will Be Owlright!	Hiyori Tamura		
2024	The Young Strangers			
2024	At the Bench		Lead role; anthology film	
2025	Sato and Sato	Sachi Sato	Lead role	
2025	Cotton Town, Please Respond	Narrator	Documentary	
2026	All the Lovers in the Night	Fuyuko Irie	Lead role	
2026	Sinsin and the Mouse	Chizumi	Lead role; Taiwanese-Japanese film	

=== Television ===
Year	Title	Role	Notes	Ref.
2009	Shōkōjo Seira	Nana Sakurai		
2015	99.9 Criminal Lawyer	Kanako		
2016	Sanada Maru	Taka	Taiga drama	
2017	Foreboding	Miyuki Asakawa	Miniseries	
2017	Rental Lover	Sumire Michibata		
2018	School Lawyer	Shiori Mochozuki		
2018	The Count of Monte Cristo: Great Revenge			
2018	Manpuku	Taka Kōda	Asadora	
2019	Ōoku the Final	Taki	Television film	
2019	Shōnen Torajirō	Tsune Kuruma	Miniseries	
2019	Yume-Shokudō no Ryōrinin	Michiko	Television film	
2020	Cursed in Love	Shiori Hase		
2022	Lost Man Found	Yoshiko		
2022	The Aromantics	Sakuko Kodama	Lead role	
2022	Atom's Last Shot	Umi Tominaga		
2023	At Least On Sunday Night	Shōko Noda		
2023	Ōoku: The Inner Chambers	Kazunomiya		
2025	Murderous Encounter	Makoto Tsutsui	Lead role	
2025	Queen of Mars	Chip	Miniseries	
2026	The Aosawa Murders	Makiko Saiga	Lead role	

== Awards and nominations ==
Year	Award	Category	Nominated work(s)	Result	Ref.
2020	43rd Japan Academy Film Prize	Newcomer of the Year	Just Only Love	Won	
2021	75th Mainichi Film Awards	Best Supporting Actress	Living in Your Sky	Nominated	
2023	77th Mainichi Film Awards	Best Actress	Small, Slow But Steady	Won	
2023	65th Blue Ribbon Awards	Best Actress	Small, Slow But Steady and One Day, You Will Reach the Sea	Nominated	
2023	46th Japan Academy Film Prize	Best Actress	Small, Slow But Steady	Won	
2023	96th Kinema Junpo Awards	Best Actress	Small, Slow But Steady and others	Won	
2023	47th Elan d'or Awards	Newcomer of the Year	Herself	Won	
2023	36th Nikkan Sports Film Awards	Best Actress	Small, Slow But Steady	Nominated	
2024	45th Yokohama Film Festival	Best Actress	Small, Slow But Steady	Won	
