= Ai Iinuma =

Japanese actress (born 2003)

- Born: August 5, 2003 (age 23); Kagawa Prefecture, Japan
- Occupation: Actress
- Years active: 2021–present
- Agent(s): Tsukimi Co., Ltd.
- Notable work: Vivant; My Second Aoharu

Japanese name
- Kanji: 飯沼 愛
- Hiragana: いいぬま あい
Transcriptions
- Romanization: Iinuma Ai

Ai Iinuma (Japanese: 飯沼 愛, Hepburn: Iinuma Ai; born August 5, 2003) is a Japanese television actress.

== Career ==
On September 11, 2021, Iinuma won the nationwide TBS Television actress discovery and training audition TBS Star Training Project: The Day I Become an Actress, beating approximately 9,000 candidates. She landed the lead role in her debut drama, This First Love is Fiction, which airs in the network’s first late-night programming block known as "Yoruobi Drama".

She appeared in issue 16 of the Weekly Playboy magazine, released on April 4, 2022. Her first appearance in a prime-time drama series, Atom's Last Shot, aired from October 16 to December 11 of the same year.

In 2023, Iinuma appeared in the Sunday drama series Vivant, playing Riho Ota, also known as "Blue Walker", a skilled hacker and vital character in the story. Her performance earned her recognition from viewers. She did not return for the show's second season.

On September 26, 2025, it was reported that her contract with Tanabe Agency would expire on March 31, 2026. On April 10, 2026, she announced that she had joined a new agency, Tsukimi Co., Ltd..

In 2026, she won the lead role in the Asadora (morning drama) Nagisa no Shinkaron, beating out 2,845 other candidates in an audition. The series is scheduled to air from fall 2027 through spring 2028.

== Filmography ==
=== Television ===
Year	Title	Role	Notes	Ref(s)
2021	This First Love is Fiction	Izumu Kurashima	Lead role	
2022	Seven Days of a Daddy and a Daughter	Koume Kawahara	Lead role	
2022	Atom's Last Shot	Yui Sugino		
2023	Keiji and Kenji, and sometimes Hanji	Himari Edo	episode 4	
2023	Vivant	Riho Ohta		
2023	My Second Aoharu	Marin Sawashima		
2023–24	Angel's Ears: Night of the Traffic Police	Naho Mikuriya		
2024	Superstar Minami Is My Boyfriend!?	Chiyomi Horikiri	Lead role	
2027–28	Nagisa no Shinkaron	Nagisa Fujishiro	Lead role; Asadora	

== Awards and nominations ==
Year	Award ceremony	Category	Nominated work(s)	Result	Ref.
2021	TBS Star Development Project: The Day I Become an Actress	—N/a	Herself	Won	
