= All the Lovers in the Night =

2011 novel by Mieko Kawakami

- First edition cover of the English translation
- Author: Mieko Kawakami
- Original title: すべて真夜中の恋人たち
- Translator: Sam Bett; David Boyd
- Language: Japanese
- Publisher: Kodansha
- Publication date: October 13, 2011
- Publication place: Japan
- English publication date: May 3, 2022
- Pages: 304
- ISBN: 978-4-06-217286-8
- OCLC: 757469687

All the Lovers in the Night (Japanese: すべて真夜中の恋人たち, Hepburn: Subete Mayonaka no Koibitotachi) is a 2011 novel by Mieko Kawakami, published by Kodansha. It was first published in September 2011 issue of the Japanese literary monthly Gunzo. In 2022, the novel was translated from Japanese into English by Sam Bett and David Boyd.

== Plot ==
The novel follows Fuyuko Irie, a freelance proofreader in her mid-thirties who lives alone, over the course of about eight months. She starts by describing a life defined by careful routine, devotion to work, and solitude. As she begins to develop friendships with a complicated colleague and a gentle, unusual man, Irie's stable veneer cracks. The story follows Irie's stream of consciousness from the present to memories and dreams. While her character is defined by her difficulty speaking to others and sense of embarrassment, her narration is as if she is speaking to herself: unflinchingly sensuous and intimate, unconcerned with making herself appear attractive. The months in the novel chronicle her dissociation, coming to terms with a secret rape, drinking, and an attempt to understand what others can and cannot see in a person.

== Reception ==
All the Lovers in the Night was generally well received by critics, including starred reviews from Booklist, Kirkus Reviews. and Publishers Weekly.

Kirkus called the novel an "unforgettable and masterful work," while Booklist referred to it as "[c]andid and searing." Publishers Weekly wrote, "Kawakami turns this study of a 'dictionary definition of a miserable person,' as Fuyuko calls herself, into an invigorating and empowering portrait."

The New York Times Book Review writes, "What makes Kawakami's novel so brilliant is an understanding of why women might willingly adhere to regressive modes of performative femininity, even while they criticize it. The desire to be loved is no small thing ... Kawakami's novel is uncompromisingly candid in its appraisal of the harm women inflict on one another, while never losing sight of the overarching structures that lead them to do so in the first place."

The Washington Post wrote, "with this consummate novel, Kawakami's star continues to rise, pulsing against a night that's anything but holy."

Discussing the writing of the novel, Idra Novey, writing for The Atlantic, noted, "Kawakami doesn't just assemble a tactile detail and park it in a scene. Sensation itself drives her scenes, the way the senses can steer a poem ... The startling vividness of Kawakami's images draws the reader deeper into the emotional intensity of the scenes." Shelf Awareness added that the novel's "colloquial, confessional and conversational style and wondrous discourses on the nature of light lend an atmospheric tone devoid of melodrama. By portraying the specific with such intricacy, Kawakami invites all readers in." Financial Times highlighted Kawakami's history as a blogger and poet, saying "her prose retains the accessibility of a blog, with glimpses of lyricism."

Publishers Weekly named All the Lovers in the Night one of the top ten novels of 2022, regardless of genre.
