= Bungakukai =

Japanese literary magazine

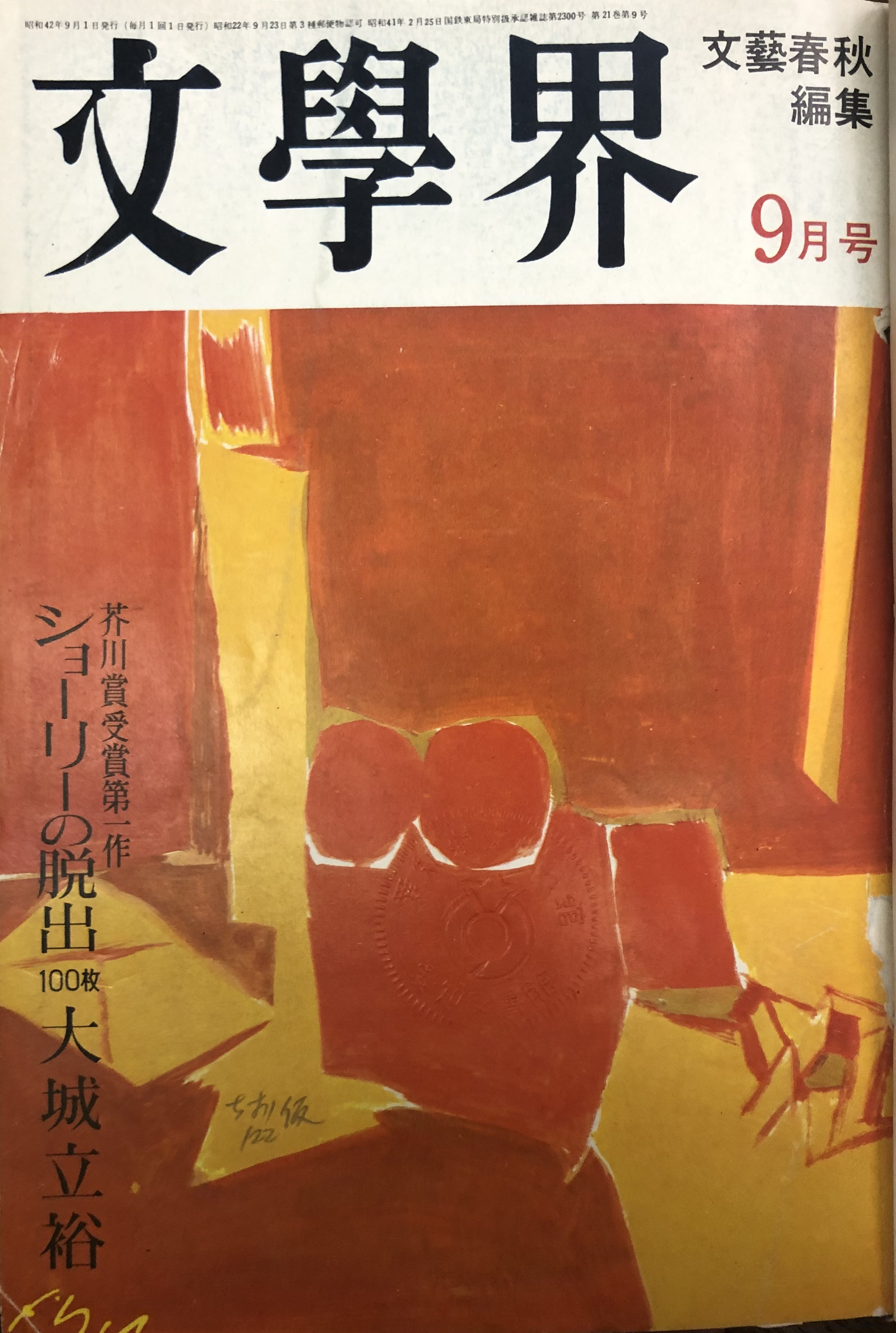
- Cover of the September 1967 issue of Bungakukai
- Frequency: Monthly
- Publisher: Bungeishunjū
- Founded: 1893
- Country: Japan
- Based in: Tokyo
- Language: Japanese
- OCLC: 5369295

Bungakukai (文學界; "Literary World") is a Japanese monthly literary magazine published by Bungeishunjū as a junbungaku (純文学; lit. "pure literature") oriented publication.

== History and profile ==
The first version of Bungakukai was published from 1893 to 1898. The founders were the first generation romantic authors in the country. The magazine featured articles on romanticism, modernism and idealism. The magazine's second version started in October 1933. Bungeishunjū has owned the magazine since then.

The headquarters of Bungakukai is in Tokyo. Along with Shinchō, Gunzo, Bungei and Subaru, it is one of the five leading literary journals in Japan. It runs a contest for newcomer writers Bungakukai Shinjinshō (Japanese: 文學界新人賞, Newcomer Award of Literary World).
