= All Kaidan =

Japanese horror manga magazine

- Categories: Horror, Shōjo manga
- Frequency: Irregular (Issues 1-7) Monthly (Issues 12-13) Bimonthly (Issues 8-12,14-16)
- First issue: September 1997
- Final issue: July 2000
- Company: Sōmasha
- Country: Japan
- Language: Japanese

Super Horror
- Categories: Horror, Shōjo manga
- Frequency: Bimonthly
- First issue: September 2000
- Final issue: March 2001
- Company: Sōmasha
- Country: Japan
- Language: Japanese

All Kaidan (オール怪談, Ōru Kaidan, lit. All Ghost Stories) was a horror anthology magazine published by Sōmasha, starting on September 5, 1997 and ending on July 7, 2000. The magazine's frequency was often changed, something unusual amongst Japanese horror manga magazines. It was succeeded by Super Horror (スーパーホラー), a magazine that lasted 4 issues.

It shares its name with Hibari Shobo's rental horror manga anthology All Kaidan, to distinguish the two some collectors call the Sōmasha magazine Heisei All Kaidan.

== History ==
Sōmasha's previously published a line of horror manga volumes called Black Bunko, and on September 5, 1997 the first issue of All Kaidan was released.

The magazine had an irregular schedule until the 8th issue on March 4, 1999; after that it mostly followed a bimonthly frequency. The magazine lasted 8 more issues, the 16th issue was the final one.

In September 2000 the magazine's successor Super Horror had its first issue released, the cover art was done by Junji Ito. The cover of the other 3 issues were drawn by Shinichi Koga.

After its discontinuation, both All Kaidan and Super Horror became rare items.

== Notable manga artists featured ==
- Shinichi Koga
  - Eko Eko Azarak: Fukkatsu Shin Rensai (エコエコアザラク復活新連載, Eko Eko Azarak: New Series Revival), serialized in Super Horror issues No.3 and March 2001
- Hideshi Hino
- Ochazukenori
  - Shin Yōkai Monogatari, serialized in All Kaidan issues No.4-14
- Osada Not
  - Kotō no Oni, serialized in All Kaidan issues No.3 and No.12
- Saiko Kaburagi
- Mori Kanda
  - Honto wa Kowakute Grimm Dōwa (本当は怖くて哀しいグリム童話), serialized in All Kaidan issues No.10-16
- Rei Mikamoto
  - Oneshots:
    - Swan no Mizu, All Kaidan No.9
    - Horror Shop 666, All Kaidan No.6
    - Shi ga Futari wo Wakatsu Made, All Kaidan No.7
- Noroi Michiru
- Miyako Cojima
- Yumeji Tanima
- Misao Inagaki
- Senri Noguchi
- Sakurai Sōshi
  - Jizō Tenshi (自造天使), serialized in All Kaidan issues No.5-15
- Jun Hatanaka
- Takatsuka Q
