= Mantis Woman =

2000 manga created by Senno Knife

Mantis Woman (Japanese: カマキリ女, Hepburn: Kamakiri Onna) is a single volume shojo horror manga created by Senno Knife. The series was first published in the June 1998 issue of Horror M magazine. It was released in English in June 2003 by Studio Ironcat. The original edition of the collection includes six stories inspired by the Japanese urban legends like Kuchisake-onna as well as the visual aesthetic of Marilyn Manson.

There are 2 different versions published by Bunkasha which have some differences in which stories are included. These two versions are the Horror M Series release from 2000, and the Horror M Comics Bunko release from 2006.

== Included works ==
=== Horror M Series ===
==== Mantis Woman ====
From Horror M 07/1998. This work is based on the urban legend of the "Slit-Mouth Woman," and the author said, "I arbitrarily profiled the Slit-Mouth Woman based on her behaviors and created the design of Mantis Woman as a deformed version of Marilyn Manson."

The murder of a teacher takes place at Chiaki's school. The teacher was decapitated with a sharp blade and the head was taken away. According to Chiaki's younger brother, it seems to be the work of the "mantis woman."

The mantis woman appears with long flowing hair and wearing a red coat, and is rumored to cut off people's heads with a sharp sickle and turn them into dolls. Just as the rumored, there have been frequent cases of students being beheaded around Chiaki and it seems that the newly appointed female teacher, Suzugamori Mariko, is hiding a secret...

==== The Zenda Family's Hell ====
From Horror M 06/1999.

A strange family named Zenda moves into the vacant house next to Mai's house. Ryosuke Zenda, the eldest son who entered the class next to Mai's, was bullied by his classmates Hino and Mori shortly after transferring to the school. That afternoon, the two bullies were told they had won a prize of 1 million yen and were taken to the Zenda house in a wagon with a strange pattern. The two were judged by the Zenda family, who were dressed as demons (except for the grandfather, who was dressed as King Enma.) From that day on, people began disappearing in the town where Mai lived...

One day, Mai sees a van parked in the garden of the Zenda family home and is tried for peeking at the Zenda family's trial. However, she manages to get out onto the ground, she sees a recreation of hell, and now has to escape.

==== Koala is Watching... ====
From Horror M 10/1999. This story was inspired by Senno Knife's wife's disliking of koalas.

One day, Yukari receives a koala stuffed animal from an unknown sender. She consults with her friend Miyama and has her leave it with her, but Miyama is stabbed to death by an unknown perpetrator. While she is in the hospital hallway, she receives a call from someone claiming to be a Koala, and the stuffed animal in front of Yukari's house. When she picks it up, it looks like there are human eyes around the koala's eyes were meant to be.

When she consults her friend Ayami, she learns that she has heard a rumor from a senior student that a male student nicknamed "Koala" kept sending a koala stuffed animal to a girl he liked, but it was thrown away and he ended up committing suicide.

While Yukari was disturbed, the koala arrogantly asked for love. When Yukari refused, a human arm with a hammer came out of the koala's mouth and smashed the glass. Yukari was about to be strangled, so she stabbed the koala repeatedly with scissors. Shocked, the koala jumped off the balcony, but although blood splattered where it landed, the stuffed koala was empty.

==== The Water Beckons ====
From Sōmasha's All Kaidan 11/1999.

Miyajima is a female student who can't swim at all. She meets a girl named Katagiri Mayumi in the shower room and they make a promise to practice swimming at the pool at night. However, none of her classmates know who Katagiri Mayumi is. Late at night, Miyajima meets up with Katagiri Mayumi at school at night, and they head to the pool...

==== Hell's Gumball Machine ====
From KADOKAWA's The Horror 06/1999.

The rumor of Hell's Gumball Machine (a gacha machine in the original) is whispered among elementary school students. It is said that it appears suddenly in a random place in town, and contains an item that will make wishes come true.

When a girl says she has found the Hell's Gumball Machine, 2 classmates go to the place where it is. When the three of them take out all the capsules and combine the contents insidd, they create something that looks like a creepy Kewpie doll, the doll disappears before their eyes and grants their wishes one by one...

==== The Snake Boy ====
From LEED's Kyōfu no Yakata DX 08/1998. To commemorate the 100th anniversary of Edogawa Ranpo's birth, the introduction was written in the style of Ranpo, but in the Horror M Comics Bunko edition of Mantis Woman, Senno Knife says that the man in the story ended up resembling Kosuke Kindaichi.

A woman on a train carrying something wrapped in cloth gets asked by the man sitting opposite of her about what had happened, the woman began to tell him the story of the thing.

The woman was once a maid for a wealthy family, who paid off their debts. The family not only bullied the maids, but also committed all sorts of villainous acts to stave off boredom, such as ruining a company, pulling strings behind the scenes to make a bank go bankrupt, and building a large dam in the hometown of a person they disliked.

One day, while carrying tea, the woman overhears them saying "Thanks to the snake boy, this family, which was once a humble antique dealer, has prospered..." After everyone has finished drinking tea and left the place, the woman opens the safe and takes a quick look at the snake boy, but accidentally drops it. However, the case is intact, but the snake boy is gone...

=== Horror M Comics Bunko ===
Contains the same stories as the Horror M series release (Mantis Woman, Koala is Watching, The Zenda Family's Hell, The Water Beckons, Hell's Gumball Machine, and The Snake Boy) along with 5 additional stories:

==== Jigoku Kazoku (地獄家族) ====
From Horror M 01/1998, also included in Shi no Megami

Chizuru, who entered the sea of trees with the intention of committing suicide, gets lost and seeks help from a house, that house is in the middle of the forest, and she ends up living there as the daughter.

However, the residents of the house are all lunatics, and they hunt down those wanting to commit suicide and eat their meat, Chizuru tries to escape the house, but fails, and is treated like a pet dog...

==== Akumu no Kyōshitsu (悪夢の教室) ====
From Horror M 01/2001, also included in Shi no Megami

Yashiro Mari becomes friends with Sagawa after protecting her when she is being bullied. Since then, every night she begins to have the same dream as Sagawa, in the dream, she is in a dark classroom, and the people bully Sagawa and are as violent as possible towards anyone who tells them off.

Anyone who is tortured ends up suffering the same fate as in the dream. Mari suspects that the secret of the dream lies in the old school building where Sagawa often frequents, so she visits the old school building...

==== Colosseum (コロシアム) ====
From Horror M 01/2001, also included in Meikyū Circus

Ayako, who was being bullied, had a dream in which her guardian angel gave her a miniature Colosseum and whenever she thought of someone she hated, a tiny version of that person was trapped inside.

Ayako sends anyone she dislikes into the Colosseum and brutally murders them, her friend Kaori, who heard about this, is also sent to the Colosseum...

==== Rei Ningyo (霊人形) ====
From Horror M 11/2001, also included in Meikyū Circus

==== Yōchū (妖虫) ====
From Horror M 01/2002, also included in Meikyū Circus

One day, Yukino noticed that the sky was very clear and climbed onto the roof of the school building to get a better look, next to her was her classmate Kirika, who was pointing into the air and counting things that Yukino could not see.

The next day, Kirika collapsed at school, and something was found protruding from her shoulder blade area, soon after, a disease called "Ghost Bug Disease" began to spread among the public. It doesn't matter what gender or age you are, most of the victims' bodies gradually become deformed and die.

== Reception ==
A columnist for CBR say they recommend the anthology wholeheartedly due to the short story Koala is Watching. However they do note that Knife's artwork feels a bit too bland and static for the stories.

== Book ==
- Senno, Knife (June 29, 2003). Mantis Woman. Studio Ironcat; Gph edition. ISBN 978-1-929090-68-6.
