= Horror M =

Japanese horror manga magazine

- Categories: Horror, Shōjo manga/Josei manga
- Frequency: Monthly (1993-2008); Bimonthly (2008-2010)
- First issue: August 1993
- Final issue: August 2010
- Company: Bunkasha
- Country: Japan
- Language: Japanese

Horror M (ホラーM(ミステリー)) was a bimonthly Japanese horror manga magazine published by Bunkasha. It was established as a supplementary issue of Manga Shareda!! (まんがシャレダ!!) and became its own monthly publication in June 1994. Horror M became a bimonthly magazine in the August 2008 issue, released on the 5th of July. It ceased publication with its August 2010 issue, however the sister publication Anata ga Taikenshita Kowai Hanashi (あなたが体験した怖い話) continued to gain new issues, and is active to this day. Nowadays bunkasha reprints and digitalized horror manga serialized in Horror M and in other magazines such as Suspiria and Suspense & Horror under the Horror M imprint.

== History ==
During the 90s there was a new boom in horror manga magazines targeting junior high and high-school girls in Japan, often featuring commentary on serious social issues and explicit depictions of violence, and in 1993 Horror M was launched to compete with these magazines. It quickly gained success and started leaning into splatter and gory horror manga.

In the 2000s, the magazine started featuring more mature and adult content, shifting into the josei manga demographic. Series like Reiko the Zombie Shop and Satanister, both written by Rei Mikamoto, frequently featured partial nudity and fan service of its female characters.

Starting with August 2008 issue, Horror M became a bimonthly publication, releasing on the 6th of odd-numbered months, but they were named after even-numbered months. In March 2009 the sister publication Horror Anthology: Tokage (ホラーアンソロジー トカゲ, Horā Ansorojī Tokage) was created for odd-numbered months.

Tokage was discontinued in Volume 8 released May 2010. Horror M also ceased publication in August of the same year and was replaced by the monthly Digital Horror M in September, with some series being moved to this new digital magazine, however, it would only last a few issues.

== Notable manga artists featured ==
- Kanako Inuki
  - Bukita
  - Alouette no Uta
  - Dokutsukai Ranko
- Ochazukenori
  - Ankoku Jiten
  - TVO
  - Mushi Danshaku
- Hideshi Hino
  - The Collection
  - GO HOME
- Senno Knife
  - Mantis Woman
  - Ningen Modoki
- Rei Mikamoto
  - Reiko the Zombie Shop
  - Satanister
- Akemi Matsuzaki
  - Shimaneki Ningyou
  - Bloody Mary
- Matsuri Akino
  - Pet Shop of Horrors
  - Kenja no Ishi
- Yōsuke Takahashi
  - Man Eater
  - Tetsunagi-Oni
  - Mononoke Zoushi
- Utata Yoshikawa
  - Sukkuto Kitsune
- Mayuri Yamamoto
  - Reset
- Saiko Kaburagi
  - Splatter Zone
  - Mushiya Series
- Yoshimi Seki
  - Virus no Kiba
- Akane Saiga
  - Cold Apartment
- Kazuichi Hanawa
  - Fujōbutsu Reidōjo
- Mami Takezaki
- Miyako Cojima
- Misao Inagaki
- Noroi Michiru
- Futaba Ōno
- Not Osada
- Amagae Luccica
