= Saiko Kaburagi =

Japanese manga artist duo

Saiko Kaburagi (蕪木彩子, Kaburagi Saiko) is a Japanese mangaka duo composed of writer Baku Kaburagi (蕪木ばく) and illustrator Natsuki Hiura (ひうらなつき). They debuted in the December 1986 issue of the shōjo horror manga magazine Solitaire with the oneshot The Portrait of Dionne Colbert (ディオンヌ・コルベールの肖像(ポートレート), Dionnu Korubeeru no Pōtoreeto). They were one of the most notable and popular authors of splatter manga alongside Rei Mikamoto and Ochazukenori.

== Biography ==
Baku Kaburagi was born on May, 30th and Natsuki Hiura on December 5th, both have kept their birth year and most other biographical information private.

They started their career in manga on December 1986 in the horror magazine Solitaire, through the late 80s and early 90s they also published manga in Horror House, Anata no Kyoufu Taiken and Pandora. In the 90s they serialized the Mushiya Series in Horror M, Lily & Rara and Horror Family Akai-san Ka in Suspense & Horror. Their manga was also featured in Somasha's All Kaidan and Houbunsha's Horror Panic.

Their works published in Somasha's line of horror manga Black Bunko include afterwords by other artists describing and complimenting the duo's works; in Kaibou, it is written by Ochazukenori, he wrote that the bugs drawn by Kaburagi Saiko cause a reaction of disgust, in Freak, it is written by Reiko Kitagawa, and describes the duo's style as splatter. Baku Kaburagi wrote the afterword of Mori Kanda's Honto ni Atta Osoroshii Hanashi.

They became active in manga again in the late 2010s in Bunkasha's josei magazine Story na Onna-tachi.

== Books ==
- Shinobi Yoru Satsui, Kōsaidō, 1987 (偲びよる殺意) ISBN 978-4-331-45120-5
- Gakuen Splatter Horror Kaibō, Kodansha, 1988 (学園スプラッターホラー解剖) ISBN 978-4-06-316809-9
- Shishū no Mori, Tairiku Shobo, July 1989 (死臭の森) ISBN 978-4-8033-2302-3
- Reijō Gakuen, Kodansha, 1990 (霊障学園) ISBN 978-4-06-313110-9
- Shinrei Jiken-bo 1, TOEN, March 1991 (心霊事件簿1) ISBN 978-4-8078-3040-4
- Shinrei Jiken-bo 2, TOEN, April 1991 (心霊事件簿2) ISBN 978-4-8078-3042-8
- Korosanakucha, Tairiku Shobo, September 1991 (殺さなくちゃ) ISBN 978-4-8033-3685-6
- Stress - Akuma no Jikken, Kodansha, 1992 (ストレス - 悪魔の実験) ISBN 978-4-06-176357-9
- Yomigaeru Shōjo, Bunkasha, February 1994 (よみがえる少女) ISBN 978-4-8211-9396-7
- Mushi Kui, Kodansha, April 1994 (虫喰い) ISBN 978-4-06-319459-3
- Okutsu o Kubaru Shōjo, Kodansha, October 1995 ISBN 978-4-06-331011-5
- Seitai Ningyō, Kodansha, October 1995 ISBN 978-4-06-319626-9
- Elite na Niku Mushi, Bunkasha, October 1995 ISBN 978-4-8211-9447-6
- Kaburagi Saiko Horror Tanpen-shū 1, Sōmasha, October 1996 (蕪木彩子ホラー短篇集1) ISBN 978-4-916124-05-0
- Mushi ni Negai o, Bunkasha, November 1996 (虫に願いを) ISBN 978-4-8211-9517-6
- Bijo no Harawata, Kodansha, March 1997 (美女のはらわた) ISBN 978-4-06-319787-7
- Splatter Zone 1, Bunkasha, April 1997 (スプラッターゾーン①) ISBN 978-4-8211-9564-0
- Kaburagi Saiko Horror Tanpen-shū 2, Sōmasha, September 1997 (蕪木彩子ホラー短篇集2) ISBN 978-4-916124-32-6
- Mushiya no Hanayome, Bunkasha, October 1997 (虫屋の花嫁) ISBN 978-4-8211-9627-2
- Splatter Zone 2, Bunkasha, July 1998 (スプラッターゾーン②) ISBN 978-4-8211-9678-4
- Tenkōsei, Road Shuppansha, August 1999 (転校生) ISBN 978-4-921052-87-4
