= Sōmasha =

Japanese publishing company

Sōmasha (蒼馬社) was a Japanese publishing company founded in 1995 and lasted until its bankruptcy caused by a debt of 200 million yen. The company is most known for publishing horror manga in the late 90s, a lot of its books have become rare collector's items.

== History ==
Sōmasha started in 1995 releasing mostly horse related books, it only started to publish manga in June 1996 with Kimiko Morooka's BL manga When Love Plays so Cruely (愛が残酷に奏でるとき, Ai ga Zankoku ni Kanaderu Toki). In October 1996 the horror manga label Black Bunko was launched, these were pocket sized volumes collecting stories by popular authors.

In 1997 their first magazine, All Kaidan (オール怪談, Ōru Kaidan), was launched, it was a shōjo horror magazine featuring works by both experienced and new authors. In 1998, the company published 3 manga volumes in the Kaiki Book (怪奇ブック) label, posterior horror manga releases would be labeled as just Sōmasha Comics.

In 1999 a new label was made called Young Success, publishing manga biographies of popular musicians, idols and bands at the time. In 2000 the magazine All Kaidan was discontinued and was replaced with Super Horror, which mostly featured artists who worked in the previous magazine. Super Horror was discontinued after the 4th issue.

In 2002, the company went bankrupt due to a large debt of 200 million yen. Some of its manga have gotten reprints and digital versions after being acquired by other publishers.

== Magazines ==
- All Kaidan (オール怪談, Ōru Kaidan), 16 issues published through September 5, 1997 to July 7, 2000. Succeeded by Super Horror
- Super Horror (スーパーホラー), 4 issues, published on September 1, 2000, November 2000, January 2001 and March 2001.
- Zettai Kyōfu (絶対恐怖), first issue released in 1998. A josei horror manga magazine. The special editions are Fukushū no Kaikan (復讐の快感, lit. The Pleasure of Revenge) and RELEASE (リリース), a non-horror manga magazine featuring works about popular idols and musicians.
- Aizô Suspense (愛憎サスペンス)

== List of books published ==
=== Black Bunko ===
1. Rōba Shōjo (老婆少女) by Hideshi Hino
2. Kaburagi Saiko Horror Tanpen-shū 1 by Saiko Kaburagi
3. Kaiki Nekoge no An 1 by Yumeji Tanima
4. Kaiki Nekoge no An 2 by Yumeji Tanima
5. Misshitsu Club by Ochazukenori
6. Honto ni Atta Osoroshii Hanashi by Mori Kanda
7. Uroko Shōjo by Hideshi Hino
8. Jikken Ō (実験王) by Osada Not
9. Kaiki Complex (怪奇・コンプレックス) by Akirako Tōdō
10. Furan Shōjo by Hideshi Hino
11. Jigoku Mon by Tsujii Motoko
12. Zekkyō-Kan no Shi-Shōjo by Yumeji Tanima
13. Hime 1 by Ochazukenori
14. Kaidan - Ugetsu Monogatari by Miyuki Saga
15. Hone Shōjo by Hideshi Hino
16. Hime 2 by Ochazukenori
17. Freak: Kaburagi Saiko Horror Tanpen-shū 2 (奇形(フリーク)蕪木彩子ホラー短篇集2) by Saiko Kaburagi
18. La Maldición: Noroi (ラ・マルディシオン: 呪い) by Reiko Kitagawa
19. Edogawa Ranpo no Oshie to Tabisuru Otoko by Osada Not
20. Kobu Shōjo by Hideshi Hino

=== Kaiki Book ===
1. Dōki 1 by Ochazukenori
2. Dōki 2 by Ochazukenori
3. Kaiki! Shi-Niku no Otoko by Hideshi Hino

=== Sōmasha Comics / Sō Comics ===
- Passion Fruits (パッションフルーツ) by Yumi Enomoto, ISBN 978-4916124166
- Kaiki Senrigan (怪奇千里眼) by Senri Noguchi, ISBN 978-4883880140
- Jisō Tenshi 1 (自造天使 1) by Soushi Sakurai, ISBN 978-4883880270
- Ningen Modoki (人間モドキ) by Senno Knife, ISBN 978-4883880263
- Rampo Edogawa's The Strange Tale of Panorama Island (江戸川乱歩のパノラマ島奇談) by Osada Not ISBN 978-4883880133
- Kokoro Nari Yamazu: Ima, Yoshida Shōin to Sono Haha (心鳴りやまず: いま、吉田松陰とその母) by Chikae Ide, ISBN 978-4883880416
- Ningyō-Hime Millenia (人形姫ミレニアム), anthology, ISBN 978-4883881048
- Genji Monogatari: Utsukushi no Hanaran 1 (源氏物語美しの花乱1) by Chikae Ide, ISBN 978-4883882052
- Genji Monogatari: Utsukushi no Hanaran 2 (源氏物語美しの花乱2) by Chikae Ide, ISBN 978-4883882069

=== Young Success ===
- Utada Hikaru: The Pure Soul by Ari Obana, ISBN 978-4883881505

=== Other ===
- Watayuki (わた雪) by Kitagawa Reiko (Romance Library) ISBN 978-4916124197
- Comic de Cooking Oishii Recipe (コミックでクッキングおいしいレシピ), anthology, ISBN 978-4916124357 (Sō Books)
