= Yumeji Tanima =

Japanese manga artist

Yumeji Tanima (谷間夢路, Tanima Yumeji, 30 March 1943 – 7 October 2012) was a Japanese manga artist most known for his horror manga. He has also written stories under pen names Kinoshita Akihisa (木下アキヒサ, 木下昭久) , Kidō Jōji (鬼童譲二), Tani Yumeji (たにゆめ) and Deizu Nin (出井州), using each for different niches.

== History and overview ==
As a 13 year old in Junior High Yumeji ended up in the 3rd place of a manga competition at an Art Academy, the competition was held by Osamu Tezuka.

Yumeji began his career in the rental manga anthology Kao published by Kasuga Shoten in 1959 with Shi no Shouri, the manga was credited with an altered spelling of his real name, Kinoshita Akihisa. Yumeji would become a prolific mangaka during the rental manga era as Kidō Jōji and worked in the Ultra Q series. In the 60s and 70s, a few of his manga were published in the avant-garde magazine Garo, still under the pen name of Kidō Jōji.

As Deizu Nin, he became known in a wide range of genres such as erotica, shōnen manga and sex comedy comic strips for men, mostly during the 80s. He worked for kid's books and did illustrations for manual and instruction books. His erotic manga achieved great success and he became a prolific artist in this genre.

In 1986, he began drawing shōjo horror manga, in this niche, which was booming in popularity, he became a popular author, Yumeji has expressed that horror is the genre that gives him the most freedom to publish interesting works. An issue of Mainichi Shinbun described his style as striking, citing the contrast between cutesy shōjo manga-style characters and realistic backgrounds and depictions of monsters.

In the late 90s, he began experimenting with digital manga, he created the Moving Manga Company to produce and distribute motion comic adaptations of manga made through computer software.

== Moving Manga Company ==
The Moving Manga Company was Yumeji's main way of exploring the possibilities of digital software and manga, its official website displayed a wide array of flash-based content like games and interactive experiences, motion comic adaptations of horror manga by Yumeji Tanima and other authors like Hideshi Hino, Ochazukenori, Osada Not and Senno Knife were available for purchase online.

Only one of the many motion comics by the Moving Manga Company got a physical release, Tanima Yumeji no Zekkyō Gekijō (谷間夢路の絶叫劇場), it was first released as a VHS in 1999, its an anthology film composed of 2 segments based on the stories of Yumeji Tanima's Zekkyō Gekijō, a short story collection published by Akita Shoten and serialized in Monthly Suspiria. The second story is based on a story included in the collection Zekkyō-kan no Shi-Shōjo.
