= Kuchisake-onna =

Japanese urban legend

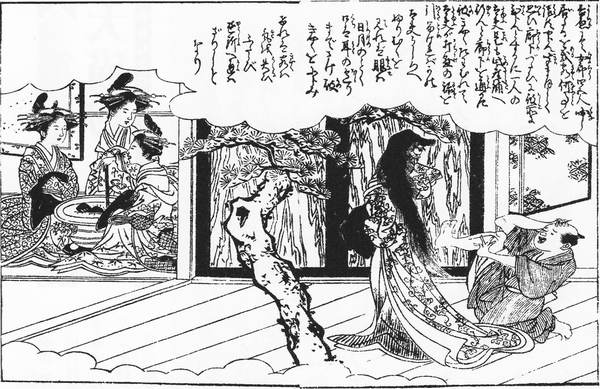
A Kuchisake-onna in a scene from Ehon Sayoshigure by Hayami Shungyōsai, 1801

Kuchisake-onna (口裂け女; 'Slit-Mouthed Woman') is a malevolent figure in Japanese urban legends and folklore. Described as the malicious, cursed spirit, or onryō, of a woman, she partially covers her face with a mask or other item to hide her scar and carries a pair of scissors, a knife, or some other sharp object. She is most often described as a tall woman of about 175–180 cm (or 5’9-5’11 ft); however, some people believe she is up to 243.84 cm (or 8ft) tall, having long straight black hair, white hands, pale skin, and otherwise being considered beautiful (except for her scar).

She has been described as a contemporary yōkai.

According to popular legend, she asks potential victims if they think she is beautiful. If they respond with "no," she will either kill them with her long medical scissors on the spot or wait until nightfall and murder them in their sleep. If they say "yes," she will reveal that the corners of her mouth are slit from ear to ear, and she will then repeat her question. If the individual responds with "no," she will kill them with her weapon, and if they say "yes" hesitantly, she will cut the corners of their mouth in such a way that resembles her own disfigurement. Methods that can be used to survive an encounter with Kuchisake-onna include answering her question by describing her appearance as "average."

The Kuchisake-onna legend has been described as dating back to the 17th to 19th centuries, during Japan's Edo period. The modern story of Kuchisake-onna originates from 1978 but only became popular in the summer of 1979, when several newspapers and magazines reported on the legend, and rumors surrounding it spread throughout the country, leading to young children being accompanied by groups of adults while walking home from school.

== Legend and variations ==
Diagram of a possible conversation with Kuchisake-onna and its consequences, according to the legend

The legend says Kuchisake-onna was a woman who was mutilated during her life, with her mouth being slit from ear to ear. In the most common version of the story in Japan, her appearance came as a result of an attack by a jealous woman, often her sister, or a botched plastic surgery or dental procedure; in the West, the most common version says that Kuchisake-onna was the adulterous wife or a mistress of a samurai during her life. She grew lonely because the samurai was always away from home fighting, and began having affairs with men around the town. When the samurai heard of her actions, he was outraged. As punishment for her infidelity, her husband sliced the corners of her mouth from ear to ear. In other versions, her mouth is filled with numerous sharp teeth.

After her death, the woman returned as a vengeful spirit, or onryō. As an onryō, she covers her mouth with a cloth mask (often specified as a surgical mask), or in some iterations, a hand fan or handkerchief. She carries a sharp instrument with her, which has been described as a knife, a machete, a scythe, or a large pair of scissors. She is also described as having supernatural speed. She is said to ask potential victims if they think she is attractive, often phrased as "Watashi, kirei?" (Note: The word "kirei" is a homophone for "kire", meaning "cut".) (which translates to "Am I pretty?" or "Am I beautiful?"). If the person answers "no," she will kill them with her weapon, and if the person answers "yes," she will reveal her mutilated mouth. She then repeats her question (or asks "Kore demo?" which translates to "Even with this?" or "Even now?") and if the person responds with "no" or screams in fright, she will kill the person with her weapon. If the response is "yes," she will slice the corners of the person's mouth from ear to ear, resembling her own disfigurement.

An individual can survive an encounter with Kuchisake-onna by using one of several methods. In some versions of the legend, Kuchisake-onna will leave the potential victim alone if they answer "yes" to both of her questions, though in other versions, she will visit the individual's residence later that night and murder the person while sleeping. Another tactic is to say that the individual is running late and she will simply bow and apologize, allowing the individual to pass. Other survival tactics include replying to Kuchisake-onna's question by describing her appearance as "average", giving the individual enough time to run away; distracting her by giving her money or hard candies, particularly the variety of candy known as bekko ame, made of caramelised sugar (or throwing them in her direction, as she will stop to pick them up); or by saying the word "pomade" three times.

== History ==
Author and folklorist Matthew Meyer has described the Kuchisake-onna legend as having roots dating back to Japan's Edo period, which spanned from the 17th to 19th centuries but Japanese literature professor Iikura Yoshiyuki believes it dates from the 1970s. The most accepted idea of its origins is that it comes from the Gifu Prefecture in 1978.

In print, the legend of Kuchisake-onna dates back to at least as early as 1979. The legend was reported in such publications as the Gifu Prefecture newspaper Gifu Nichi Nichi Shinbun on 26 January 1979, the weekly publication Shukan Asahi on 23 March 1979, and the weekly news magazine Shukan Shincho on 5 April 1979. Rumors about Kuchisake-onna spread throughout Japan, which led to young children sometimes being accompanied by members of parent–teacher association groups while walking home from school.

Historian and manga author Shigeru Mizuki considered Kuchisake-onna to be an example of a yōkai, a term that can refer to a variety of supernatural monsters, spirits, and demons in Japanese folklore. According to Zack Davisson, a translator of many of Mizuki's works, "When Mizuki put her in one of his newest yokai encyclopedias, that's when she was officially considered a yokai."

== In popular culture ==
Kuchisake-onna has appeared in live-action films, as well as in manga, anime, and video games. The character appears in the 1994 animated film Pom Poko, produced by Studio Ghibli, and later appears in the 1996 live-action short film Kuchisake-onna, directed by Teruyoshi Ishii. She is the antagonist in Kanako Inuki's horror manga oneshot Kuchisake-onna Densetsu and its sequel Mama wa Kuchisake-onna, both were first published in the magazine Suspense & Horror, these stories were included in the 2-volume anthology Kuchisake-onna Densetsu. Kuchisake-onna is also mentioned in the 1998 film Ring, directed by Hideo Nakata. In 2007, the film Carved: The Slit-Mouthed Woman (also known under the titles Kuchisake-onna or A Slit-Mouthed Woman), directed by Kōji Shiraishi and featuring Miki Mizuno as Kuchisake-onna, was released. The film was followed by Carved 2: The Scissors Massacre (also known as Kuchisake-onna 2) and The Slit-Mouthed Woman 0: The Beginning (or Kuchisake-onna 0: Biginingu), both of which were released in 2008. The Kuchisake-onna character later appeared in the 2012 films Kuchisake-onna Returns and found-footage mockumentary Senritsu Kaiki File Kowasugi File 01: Operation Capture the Slit-Mouthed Woman. The Kuchisake-onna also the main character in Sensei! Kuchisake-onna desu! She has also made an appearance as a cursed spirit, summoned by Geto Suguru in Jujutsu Kaisen.

Kuchisake-onna is the main female character of the manga Even If You Slit My Mouth by Akari Kajimoto. Kuchisake-onna is also featured in Dandadan, Jujutsu Kaisen, and in the webcomic Mob Psycho 100. Kuchisake-onna was the basis for a character that appears in "Danse Vaudou", an episode of the American DC superhero television series Constantine.

An enemy called Scissor Woman, inspired by Kuchisake-onna, appears in the video game World of Horror. Kuchisake-onna also appears as a moderately strong enemy in the game Ghostwire: Tokyo. She has two different forms: in the first one she has a long white coat, a large white hat, and is wearing a surgical mask. In her second form, her coat turns to red, and she drops both the hat and the mask, revealing her slit mouth. In both forms she uses a long pair of scissors to attack the player. A Kuchisake-onna named Sakura also appears in the upcoming platform fighter Royalty Free-For-All. She attacks using scissors and ghostly movement.

== See also ==
- Bloody Mary, an urban legend about an apparition who appears in mirrors when summoned
- Glasgow smile
- Japanese urban legends, enduring modern Japanese folktales
- La Llorona, the ghost of a woman in Latin American folklore
- Madam Koi Koi, an African urban legend about the ghost of a dead teacher
- Ouni, a Japanese yōkai with a face like that of a demon woman (kijo) torn from mouth to ear
- Teke Teke, a Japanese urban legend about the spirit of a girl with no lower body
