= Yoshimi Seki =

Japanese manga artist

Yoshimi Seki (Japanese: 関よしみ, Hepburn: Seki Yoshimi; born June 21, 1957) is a Japanese manga artist from Shimonoseki, Yamaguchi Prefecture. She is specialized in psychological horror. She won the 18th Nakayoshi and Shōjo Friend newcomer award in the April 1980 of Nakayoshi Deluxe with the short story Otome Tsubaki no Hana no Shita (乙女椿の花の下) with the pen name Itou Kayoko (いとうかよこ).

== Biography ==
When she debuted, Yoshimi Seki wrote manga with themes of friendship and romance, eventually, she felt like she had lost track of what to write and turned to horror, which became very successful.

In 1983 she changed her pen name to Yoshimi Seki because she was born in Yoshimi-machi (吉見町) in Shimonoseki.

She was one of the central figures of the 90s horror manga boom, her stories were called traumatizing and disturbing by readers due to their focus on people becoming insane due to awful situations rather than the typical supernatural elements of ghosts and demons. This has led to her being called Queen of Situational Horror and Queen of Trauma.

She wrote manga for Suspense & Horror, Horror M, The Horror, Gekkan Halloween, Suspiria, Kyōfu no Yakata DX and its successor Horror WooPee.

In 2018, Keito Aida made a seinen adaptation of her oneshot Mad Summer School, whose original version was first published in the September 1996 of Shōjo Friend: Suspense & Horror and compiled in MAD PAPA.
