= No Bra =

Japanese manga series

- Cover of volume 1 of No bra

のーぶら (Nō Bura)
- Genre: Romance, Comedy
- Manga
- Written by: Kenjiro Kawatsu
- Published by: Akita Shoten
- English publisher: NA: Studio Ironcat
- Magazine: Monthly Shōnen Champion
- Original run: 2002 – 2004
- Volumes: 5

No Bra (Japanese: のーぶら, Hepburn: Nō Bura) is a Japanese teenage boy's romance manga written and illustrated by Kenjiro Kawatsu that was serialized in Weekly Shōnen Champion from 2002 to 2004.

No Bra tells the story of Masato Kataoka, a somewhat dimwitted high school student, whose childhood friend Yuki Nomura moves in with him one day. Because of Yuki's cute face, girlish clothing, and apparent feminine features, Masato is extremely happy with his new life—until Yuki's mother calls Masato, and tells him that Yuki is a boy shortly after. The story initially revolves around Masato's relationship with Yuki and his slowly disintegrating reluctance to develop romantic feelings for her. It later began to focus heavily on other characters' acceptance of Yuki's existence as a trans girl, though not without numerous instances in which they call her a "cross-dresser".

== Synopsis ==
Years before the start of No Bra, Masato Kataoka and Yuki Nomura were childhood friends, though they were later separated—with Masato soon forgetting anything about the friendship and Yuki still treasuring those memories. Masato grows to become a high school student enrolled in Meikyuu Private Academy, whereas Yuki moves from school to school, never quite fitting in because of her trans identity. One day, Yuki moves in with Masato and starts going to school with him. Yuki promptly becomes one of the most popular girls in the class, alongside Kaoru Oozora, whom Masato nurses a crush on. Meanwhile, Yuki continues to refuse all of Masato's pleas for her to act more manly (as a result of her being a girl, not a boy), forcing Masato to stop any idea that Yuki and Masato live together, while also juggling his feelings for Yuki and Kaoru. Masato becomes confused about which girl he should pick.

== Characters ==
Masato Kataoka (片岡 正人, Kataoka Masato)
Masato Kataoka is a freshman in Meikyuu Private Academy who lives by himself in Tokyo. He always wears Hawaiian shirts and is best friends with Hideki Nogami. Masato is often one to blend with the background, although he does stand up to what he deems unjust from time to time. Masato constantly daydreams about girls (mostly Yuki), but also becomes confused when he sees Yuki as attractive, since he (incorrectly) believes her to be biologically male. Masato and Yuki were also childhood friends, but Masato does not remember anything from that time period, much to Yuki's chagrin.

He appeared short with Kaoru in Kawatsu's other manga Koibana Onsen.

Yuki Nomura (野村 ユウキ, Nomura Yūki)
Yuki is Masato's childhood friend, though unlike Masato, Yuki remembers and treasures the long-ago friendship and commonly refers to Masato as "Maa-kun" because Yuki remembers calling her childhood friend by that. Ever since Yuki and Masato parted ways in their childhood, Yuki has been growing out her hair; until Masato finally convinces her to cut it short, Yuki obliges because it represents a "memento of [their] meeting again". Yuki is also a trans girl, and this combined with her naturally feminine features causes everybody except Masato to believe Yuki is cisgender; Masato's attempts to convince people otherwise usually result in them belittling Masato and insulting him. Therefore, Yuki is extremely popular with the rest of the boys in his class, although Yuki states the only person she loves is "Maa-kun". Her family incorrectly believes her to be a "crossdresser", yet in later chapters, it is implied and acknowledged by most characters and Yuki that she has "the heart of a girl and the body of a boy" with her being accepted as transgender rather than a cross-dresser.
Hideki Nogami (野上 秀樹, Nogami Hideki)
Hideki is Masato's best friend. He is completely unaware that Yuki is trans, and as such is constantly determined to make Masato fall in love with Yuki. Hideki is depicted as being quite large, using this trait to his advantage—at one point using his massive body as a human shield for Masato to carry away a drunken Yuki from an implied risk of assault and/or harassment from her male peers. Hideki is also nicknamed "Hidepon" in the manga.
Kaoru Oozora (大空 薫, Ōzora Kaoru)
Kaoru is the most popular girl in Masato's class, having both athleticism and excellent grades. Masato is enamored with her, although he constantly berates himself for being too out of her league. However, Masato has helped Kaoru on many occasions—some of which Masato does not even remember—and this causes Kaoru to harbor some secret feelings for Masato. Noticing this, Hideki becomes angry on Yuki's behalf, and often tries to keep the two apart. She is jealous over Nomura (sensing her affection for Masato) and Miss Mizutani (misunderstanding her real intentions towards Masato). In chapter 18, it turns out "Maa-kun" is actually Kaoru. She was 'Masato Kaoru' until her mother remarried and changed her name from 'Masato' to 'Oozura'.

She appeared short with Masato in Kawatsu's other manga Koibana Onsen.

Mariko Mizutani (水谷 麻理子, Mizutani Mariko)
Mariko, also known as "Miss Mizutani" (水谷先生 Mizutani-sensei), is Masato, Yuki, Hideki, and Kaoru's homeroom teacher. She becomes suspicious when she discovers that Yuki and Masato have the same home address and appear to live together. She's quick to take advantage of their situation in order to keep herself from being fired and so she can pay her overdue loans, saying she doesn't have to pay rent while living with them. Mizutani is a rude, freeloading, alcoholic. Extremely irresponsible, she unwittingly allows Yuki drink with her and spends all of her wages on expensive goods instead of paying off her loans. Caring only for her own well being and comfort, goes to extreme lengths to make her life easier even at the expense Masato. She later offers Masato sexual experiences to continue living in his home.

== Chapter list ==
No.	Release date	ISBN
1	September 19, 2002	4-253-20331-0
01. "Nomura Yuki" (野村ユウキ, Nomura Yūki); 02. "Lies and Truth" (ウソとマコト, Uso to Makoto); 03. "Proof of Being Male!?" (男の証拠!?, Otoko no Shōko!?); 04. "Uniform Resolution!!" (制服の決意!!, Seifuku no Ketsui!!); 05. "Feeling H!?" (Hな気分!?, Eichina Kibun!?); 06. "Secret Body Exam!?" (秘密の体験!?, Himitsu no Taiken!?); 07. "Absolute Annihilation!?" (絶対絶命!?, Zettai Zetsumei !?)
2	February 20, 2003	4-253-20332-9
8. "A Date with Yuki!?" (ユウキとデート!?, Yūki to Dēto!?); 9. "Being Normal!?" (普通のコト!?, Futsū no Koto!?); 10. "My True Feelings!!" (素直な気持ち!!, Sunaona Kimochi!!); 11. "Found Out By Sensei!?" (先生に知られた!?, Sensei ni Shirareta!?); 12. "Life with 3 People!?" (3人暮らし!?, San nin Kurashi!?); 13. "Sabotage!?" (妨害工作!?, Bōgai Kōsaku!?)
3	August 7, 2003	4-253-20333-7
14. "Kaoru's Misunderstanding!?" (薫の勘違い!?, Kaoru no Kanchigai!?); 15. "Yuki's Determination!!" (ユウキの決意!!, Yūki no Ketsui!!); 16. "Mizuki's Seduction" (瑞希の誘惑, Miki no Yūwaku); 17. "The Real Maa-Kun" (まーくんの正体, Ma Kun no Shōtai); 18. "The One Called Masato" (マサトと呼ばれたヤツ, Masato to Yobareta Yatsu); 19. "Despicable!?" (卑怯者!?, Hikyōsha!?)
4	February 19, 2004	4-253-20334-5
20. "Helpless Guy" (どうしようもない男, Dō Shiyō mo nai Otoko); 21. "June Bride's Tree" (ジューンブライドツリー, Jūnburaidotsurī); 22. "A Deal With Sensei" (先生との取り引き, Sensei to no Torihiki); 23. "A Busy 1st Day" (忙しい1日, Isogashī Ichi Nichi); 24. "Summer Festival" (夏祭り, Natsu Matsuri); 25. "Excursion To Hawaii!!" (ハワイの修学旅行!!, Hawaii no Shūgakuryokō!!)
5	August 5, 2004	4-253-20335-3
26. "I Want To Kiss You!!" (君とキスしたい!!, Kimi to Kisu Shitai!!); 27. "Great Detective Mizuki" (名探偵・瑞希!!, Mei Tantei Mizuki!!); 28. "School Suspension Strife" (停学騒動, Teigaku Sōdō); 29. "Boy`s School Uniform" (男子の制服, Danshi no Seifuku); 30. "I`m Not Maa-Kun!!" (俺はまーくんじゃない!!, Ore Wa ma Kun Janai !!); 31. "The Feeling of Those Two" (ふたりの気持ち, Futari no Kimochi)
