= Invincible King Tri-Zenon =

Japanese anime television series

無敵王トライゼノン (Muteki-Ō Tri-zenon)
- Genre: Mecha, Sci-fi
- Anime television series
- Directed by: Takashi Watanabe
- Written by: Katsumi Hasegawa
- Music by: Kenji Kawai
- Studio: E&G Films
- Original network: TBS
- Original run: October 14, 2000 – March 17, 2001
- Episodes: 22
- Video game
- Developer: Marvelous Entertainment
- Publisher: Marvelous Entertainment
- Genre: Action
- Platform: Game Boy Color
- Released: March 9, 2001

Invincible King Tri-Zenon (無敵王トライゼノン, Muteki-Ō Torai-Zenon) is a Japanese anime television series created by E&G Films. Directed by Takashi Watanabe and written by Katsumi Hasegawa, the anime's 22 episodes were broadcast on TBS between October 14, 2000, and March 17, 2001. It took over the Saturday 17:30 - 18:00 timeslot once claimed by the Sakura Wars TV series.

== Plot ==
During the Edo period, three mysterious space capsules were sent down to Earth and fell in the parts of Japan. Inside there were three parts of a giant spaceship, the Shinonome (meaning sunrise), the Dawn and the Daybreak and a three robot guardians Tri-Zenon, Gaia-Zenon and Alma-Zenon. Feared that it might bring chaos to the country, the humans at that time buried them down beneath the ground.

The Empire Zenon Palace invades Earth in search of these objects. To fight this threat, the Secrets are awakened one by one.

The first to awaken, Tri-Zenon, one of the Zenon Guardians, a giant robot, is now driven by the descendant of the Kamui family, Akira Kamui, his younger brother Ai Kamui and his girlfriend Kanna.

This is the story of their fight for justice against the alien empire.

== Character Info ==
Akira Kamui: Akira is hotblooded idiot boy in middle school, but he is too much a moron to act normal what makes him unpopular.

Ai Kamui : Ai is a smart open little boy in Elementary, but he looks too much like a girl.

Gontarou Kamui: Gontarou is Akira and Ai's father, an idiotic imbecile brute with too much strength, most of the time he is a hindrance.

Reiko Kamui: Reiko is Akira and Ai's mother who left the family for an unknown reason.

Gon Kamui: Gon Kamui is the dog of the Kamui family, a smart and loyal companion.

Kanna Uryuu (Wallice): Kanna is Akira's classmate, but has a crush on him, she is a normal girl with swallow personality.

Sae Uryuu: Sae is Kanna's big sister and a member of the JGSDF, with a willful personality. So basically a dogmatic moron with a gun.

Yoshiko Uryuu: Yoshiko Uryuu is Kanna and Sae's mother. She is a mild tempered woman, with a heart of gold.

Jin Makinohara: Jin is a man in his twenties with a mature personality. He is also the leader of the Dawn, the second part of the spaceship.

Ena Makinohara: Ena is the little sister of Jin, she has naive personality and a brother-complex.

Kurama Kyou: Kyou is a lady of a noble rich family with a lot of hidden skills; she is also in love with Akira.

Doumu Kai: Kai is arrogant and silent girl who like to dress like a boy what everyone confuses.

Kichiemon SHINDOU: Kichiemon is the butler of the Kurama family capable individual.

Umi MUNAKATA: Umi is a daughter of Uchuu and Sora, she is head strong and capable but her hobby of collecting weird pets is grossing everyone out.

Riku MUNAKATA: Riku is a daughter of Uchuu and Sora, she is a finance and mathematics genius and likes to speak smart.

Shizuku ITSUKI: Shizuku is born with the power to connect to the voice of the world.

Uchuu MUNAKATA: Uchuu is the head of the Munakata family, a well connected and wealthy family who controls Japan.

Sora MUNAKATA: Sora is the wife of Uchuu, she is a smart and adventures woman.

Duran KURENADE: Duran is a general of the Zenon Empire. Duran's character and story is a mix between Reinhard von Lohengramm (Ginga Eiyuu Densetsu) and Char Asnable (Mobile Suit Gundam), he has all their main character traits.

Rolumus FASTAKS: Rolumus is a leader of the Zenon Empire. (He is a politician that say everything).

Barbara FOURU: Barbara is a general of the Zenon Empire. She is ambitious, beautiful, and deathly.

Fraudia ADOLICE: Fraudia is the spiritual leader of the Zenon Empire.

== Video game ==
On March 9, 2001, Marvelous Entertainment released a Game Boy Color video game adaption.

== Anime ==
The anime uses two pieces of theme song. "Unsteady" is the series' opening theme, while "Lost in You" is the series' ending theme. Both are sung by Megumi Hayashibara.

Preceded by Sakura Wars (4/8/2000 - 9/23/2000)	TBS Saturday 17:30 Timeframe Invincible King Tri-Zenon (October 14, 2000 - March 24, 2001)	Succeeded by You're Under Arrest (4/7/2001 - 9/29/2001)
