= Osada Not =

Japanese manga artist

Osada Not (Japanese: 長田ノオト, Hepburn: Osada Nōto; born March 16) is a Japanese manga artist and animator from Shizuoka Prefecture. She has made manga for horror magazines such as Suspense & Horror and Horror M, BL magazines such as June, Icarus and Reijin, and for the alt magazine Garo.

== Biography ==
After working as an animator at Studio Pierrot and Hiroshi Sasagawa Office, they became a freelance animator.

They debuted as a manga artist on October 1986 in the first issue of the horror magazine Prom Night (プロムナイト), published by Kindai Eigasha (近代映画社), with the short story The Infinity Girl (永遠少女, Eien Shōjo).

She is a fan of the Tokyo Grand Guignol, whose plays she used as a basis and source of inspiration for short stories, she is a friend of Hiroyuki Tsunekawa, actor of Zera in Litchi Hikari Club, and of his wife Nuts Murakami, who has written stories for Not's manga.

She has made adaptations of Kenji Ohtsuki's novels for Horror M, the adaptation of The Ghostly Film of Lingwood Terrace (リンウッド・テラスの心霊フィルム, Rin'uddo Terasu no Shinrei Firumu) was serialized through the issues of May, June and August 1997; and the adaptation of Stacy (ステーシー, Sutēshī) through February to May 1998. Both were compiled in Stacy (ステーシー), published by Bunkasha in October 1998 and Kadokawa in September 2001.

Her adaptations of Edogawa Ranpo's novels were mostly serialized in Suspiria and All Kaidan.

Not was mostly active in horror manga, her works are labeled as aesthetic horror, their main characteristics are violence, cruel characters, bishōnen, eroguro, and beautiful artwork. She has also written more explicit eroguro works for BL magazines. Her bishōnen characters have influenced the shōnensō style of fashion.

== Books ==
Many of her works have not been compiled in books yet.

- Yakan Etsuranshitsu, Tokyo Sanseisha, 1989 / Bunkasha, 1995 (夜間閲覧室)
- Bokushikan no Kaijin, Tokyo Sanseisha (牧師館の怪人)
- Phantom Ongaku Satsujin, Tokyo Sanseisha (ファントム・音楽殺人)
- Jikken-Ō, Tokyo Sanseisha, June 1994 / Sōmasha, December 1996 (実験王)
- Edogawa Ranpo • Yaneura no Sanposha, Akita Shoten, August 1994 (江戸川乱歩 屋根裏の散歩者)
- Mōjū, Bunkasha, March 1993 (盲獣)
- Notpia, Takeshobo, October 1996 (ノオトピア)
- Blood Snow, Bunkasha, November 1997 (ブラッド・スノ)
- Edogawa Ranpo no Oshie to Tabisuru Otoko, Sōmasha, December 1997 (江戸川乱歩の押絵と旅する)
- Stacy, Bunkasha, November 1998 / Kadokawa, September 2001 (ステーシー)
- Edogawa Ranpo no Panorama-Tō Kitan, Sōmasha, June 1999 (江戸川乱歩のパノラマ島奇談)
- Kotō no Oni, Bunkasha, October 2016 (孤島の鬼)

Anthology participations

- Makkana Shōjo (真っ赤な少女) in Komikku Hen Gakkou de Atta Kowai Hanashi, ASCII, 1995 (コミック版学校であった怖い話)
- Ame to Muchi no Hibi (飴と鞭の日々) in 13 Nin no Short Suspense & Horror, Kodansha, 1996 (13人のショートサスペンス&ホラー)
- Mont Sucht (モント・ザハト) and 12-Kai Kitan (12階奇談) in Akuma no Sasayaki (悪魔のささやき), Kodansha, 1997
- Kago no Tori (籠の鳥) in Horror Anthology Comic: Shikaku, Bunkasha, 2016 (ホラーアンソロジーcomic 死角)

== Artbooks and illustrations ==
- Cover of Vol.5 of anthology magazine Horror & Occukt Kyōsaku Daizenshū: HELP (ホラーオカルト競作大全集HELP)
- Art featured in Edge -A Collection of Paintings-
- Art for telephone card included in the issue celebrating Horror M's 3rd anniversary
- Cover, illustrations and promotional art of Ohtsuki Kenji's novel Stacy
- Covers of volumes 1 and 2 of BL anthology ICARUS (イカロス, Ikarosu)

== CD ==
- Original story and art for Horror M Psychophonic Sound (ホラーMサイコフォニックサウンド), CD drama adaptation of manga from the Horror M magazine. CD published by Pony Canyon
- Artwork for CD Drama Gensō Shōnen Tan Tsukihiko (幻想少年譚 月彦)
- Jacket artwork for Kinniku Shōjo Tai's album LOVE.

== See also ==
- Eroguro
- Suehiro Maruo
- Stacy
- Lychee Light Club
