= Suspense & Horror =

Japanese manga magazine

- Categories: Horror, shōjo manga
- Frequency: Quarterly
- First issue: September 1988
- Final issue: December 1998
- Company: Kodansha
- Country: Japan
- Based in: Tokyo
- Language: Japanese

Suspense & Horror (Japanese: サスペンス & ホラー, Hepburn: Sasupensu ando Horā) was a series of special issues of Shōjo Friend, and later of Bessatsu Friend, Dessert and Kiss manga magazines dedicated to works in the horror and thriller genres. The specific label for manga serialized in the magazine was KC Friend: Suspense & Horror.

== History ==
The first issue was released in September 1988 to an overwhelming success of near 99% of copies being sold, which lead Suspense & Horror to become one of the most influential magazines during the 90s horror manga boom. Kanako Inuki was the illustrator for the covers of most issues with the exception being the final issue, whose cover was done by Madoka Kawaguchi.

The September 1996 issue was the last one released as a Shōjo Friend special due to the cessation of that magazine, and Suspense & Horror was moved to Bessatsu Friend in January 1997, Dessert in September 1997, and to Kiss in August 1998.

== Notable manga artists featured ==
- Kanako Inuki
  - Hell Mother
  - Fushigi no Tatari-chan
  - Kuchisake Onna Densetsu
  - Warau Nikumen
  - Inuki Kanako no Chimamire Ehon
  - Ubasute
- Yoshimi Seki
  - Aurora ga Korosu
  - Mashōjo Tensei
  - Mad Papa
- Madoka Kawaguchi
  - Shi to Kanojo to Boku
- Chie Watari
  - Future
  - Yuganda Kishi
- Atsuko Narumo
  - Yami Kara no Sasoi
- Saiko Kaburagi
  - Stress
  - Kaiki Shōgekijō
- Hideshi Hino
  - The Art of Hideshi Hino
- Kei Arita
  - Shiawase Uranaikan
- Osada Not
  - Kōrichū no Bishōnen
  - Kago no Tori
- Keiko Seguchi
  - Kamakiri Yakata no Sangeki
- Kanon Iguchi
  - Kyō no News
  - Nigetemo Nigetemo...
- Tanima Yumeji
  - Zekkyō Daiyogen
- Kaoru Ohashi
  - Ningyo no Kubi
  - Majo no Iru Kyōshitsu
- Ochazukenori
  - Satsujin Dial 9999
- Piyoko Marui
  - Taro-kun no Densha
- Tomomi Sanjō
  - Inu ni Naritai!
- Kazuhashi Tomo
  - Mayonaka no Shōjo
