= Octopus Girl =

Japanese manga series

- Octopus GirI
- North American cover of the first volume of Octopus Girl

戦慄!!タコ少女 (Senritsu!! Tako Shōjo)
- Genre: Horror, Black comedy
- Manga
- Written by: Tooru Yamazaki
- Published by: LEED Publishing
- English publisher: NA: Dark Horse Comics
- Magazine: Kyōfu no Yakata DX
- Original run: 1994 – 1996
- Volumes: 4

Octopus Girl (戦慄!!タコ少女, Senritsu!! Tako Shōjo; "Shudder!! Octopus Girl") is a shōjo horror comedy manga written and illustrated by Tooru Yamazaki (山咲 トオル, Yamazaki Tooru). It made its first appearance in 1994 as a feature for Kyōfu no Yakata DX before its commercial release on the LEED Publishing Co. label.

== Plot ==
Octopus Girl is made-up of a series of vignettes about the titular character Takako (Called Takoko by her classmates) who is regularly bullied by her classmates. They take things too far one day and attempt to drown her, then force her to eat a live octopus, which she is allergic to. Both almost kill her. However, she wakes up that night with the body of an octopus but the head of a girl. She then brutally gets revenge on the bullies. She later figures out how to control her transformations.
