= School Zone (manga) =

Japanese manga series

- Cover of the first volume of the School Zone manga

スクールゾーン (Sukuuru Zoon)
- Genre: Horror, Supernatural
- Manga
- Written by: Kanako Inuki
- Published by: Leed Publishing
- English publisher: NA: Dark Horse Comics
- Magazine: Kyōfu no Yakata DX
- Original run: 1996 – 1999
- Volumes: 3

School Zone (スクールゾーン, Sukuuru Zoon) is a horror manga series by Kanako Inuki. The series follows a group of children as they discover that the many ghost stories, urban legends, and superstitions they have heard about their school are real.

== Plot ==
There exist thirteen ghost stories about the school and, it is said, a terrible fate is reserved for those unlucky ones who learn all thirteen. One afternoon, one student tells the others the one about the human head found in the school elevator. Soon after, many students begin to experience strange and terrible encounters with the supernatural, and coming to school now becomes a struggle for survival.

== Reception ==
It has received a positive review from Katherine Dacey from The Manga Critic.
