= Tsukikomori =

- Super Famicom cover art
- Developer: Pandora Box
- Publisher: Banpresto
- Producer: Takiya Iijima
- Platforms: Super Famicom, Nintendo Switch
- Release: Super Famicom: JP: March 1, 1996; Nintendo Switch: JP: September 10, 2026
- Genre: Visual novel
- Mode: Single-player

Tsukikomori (Note: Japanese: 晦-つきこもり) is a 1996 visual novel for the Super Famicom. The game features a family gathering after the funeral of their grandmother. Each person gathered tells ghost stories. Depending on the order the player takes in choosing who to tell the story, the stories change.

Developed by Pandora Box and published by Banpresto, it is considered a companion piece to their previous game Gakkou de atta Kowai Hanashi (1995). On its release, it was not as popular as the companion release, but it grew in popularity by 2017. The game received positive commentary from three of the four reviewers in Famitsu who found it to be a proper expansion of the ideas shown in Gakkou de atta Kowai Hanashi. The game was re-released on Nintendo's Virtual Console for the Wii U as well as being set for a re-release in Japan for the Nintendo Switch in 2026.

== Plot and gameplay ==
Tsukikomori is a sound novel. Mark Kretzschmar and Sara Raffel, authors of The History and Allure of Interactive Visual Novels, described the term used to primarily define Japanese games that rely on graphics and sounds instead of puzzles to tell a story and was more generally interchangeable with visual novels.

Tsukikomori features a family get-together at a funeral after the death of their grandmother. The narrators tell each other ghost stories. These stories are told from varying age groups, and they tell different stories set at various locations such as television stations, hospitals, forests and cities. The player selects narrators to tell stories. Depending on the order the player chooses, the stories can change from narrator to narrator. The story's progression and endings change depending on several choices the player makes. Depending on their choices, there are over 200 variations of the storylines.

== Development ==
Tsukikomori was developed by Pandora Box. Video game ournalist Naohiko Misuno described Tsukikomori as being a companion title to Pandora Box's previous sound novel Gakkou de atta Kowai Hanashi (1995). Both titles were produced by Takiya Iijima, who was formerly known by his pen name Ken'ichi Iijima.

The characters and background graphics in the game are based on live-action footage.

== Release ==
Tsukikomori was published by Banpresto in Japan for the Super Famicom on March 1, 1996. Misuno described Tsukikomori as not being as popular as Gakkou de atta Kowai Hanashi which had several websites with fan art and fan fiction dedicated to its characters, while Tsukikomori was mostly only known by the core fanbase of the earlier game and suggested that the release of the game late in the lifecyle of the Super Famicom also potentially did not help.

In Japan, Tsukikomori was released for the Wii in June 2012 and for the Wii U Virtual Console and on September 7, 2016. Misuno said that by 2017, the Tsukikomori had undergone a resurgence in popularity. Both Tsukikomori and Gakkou de atta Kowai Hanashi are set for individual and bundled re-release in Japan for the Nintendo Switch on September 10, 2026. This version will add features such as quick saves, and abilities to move backwards and speed forwards through the stories.

== Reception ==
Reception

Review score
Publication	Score
Famitsu	7/10, 7/10, 7/10, 5/10

In a contemporary reviews, Famitsu had four critics review the Tsukikomori. Two reviewers found the game like an improved version of Gakkou de atta Kowai Hanashi due to its wider range of settings and characters. One reviewer complimented the great writing saying that it led to the shifts in the story feeling natural while Hirokazu Hamamura praised the unique and unsettling touches from producer Takiya Iijima. One reviewer found it frustrating to reach an end in the game to only have to restart and re-hear a story, while another said that one's entire enjoyment of this will vary depending on their taste in these kind of stories. One reviewer commented on the graphics saying they may seem plain at first, but they were an effectively done, especially when sudden shock imagery appeared making it all more effective.

In a retrospective, Misuno praised the game as feeling like a more expanded version of Gakkou de atta Kowai Hanashi and that it featured the "creative touch" of producer Takaya Iijima.

== See also ==
- List of Super Nintendo Entertainment System games
- Video games in Japan
