= Tooru Yamazaki =

Japanese manga artist and media personality

- 山咲トオル
- Pronunciation: Nakazawa Souhachirou
- Born: 中沢惣八郎; 1969/08/23; Minato, Tokyo
- Occupations: Mangaka; Singer; Media personality; Radio personality; Writer
- Years active: 1994–present
- Agent: Ohta Production
- Known for: Appearances on variety TV shows and horror comedy manga.
- Notable work: Octopus Girl
- Relatives: Hatsue Nakazawa (sister) Inazuma Raigorō (great-great-grandfather)
- Awards: The 33rd Television Drama Academy Awards, Best New Actor (Spring Runner)
- Website: https://www.toguro.com/

Tooru Yamazaki (山咲トオル, Yamazaki Tōru), alternatively spelled as Toru Yamazaki and Tohru Yamazaki, is a Japanese manga artist, singer, TV personality, writer and radio host. His real name is Sōhachirō Nakazawa (中沢 惣八郎). His older sister is the idol Hatsue Nakazawa, who he has helped write lyrics and composed music for.

He is openly homosexual and has a great interest in Showa era idol culture. His pseudonym comes from DJ, model and actress Senri Yamazaki, and a reference to the name of his older sister's ex-husband, Tōru.

== Biography ==
He was born in Minato, Tokyo but moved to Okinawa at the age of 7. Tooru was bullied when he was little due to being effeminate, but when he became a third-year student in the design department of Okinawa Prefectural Urasoe Technical High School he got popular and accepted.

He first aspired to be an idol, inspired by his sister's debut, and appeared in karaoke image videos and participated in large-scale auditions but failed. After browsing a horror manga magazine issue and noticing they were looking for newcomer artists, he decided to submit a manga, so in 1994, he debuted as manga artist with the horror short story Uroko Jigoku for LEED's monthly shōjo magazine Kyōfu no Yakata DX and gained quick popularity and notoriety. Most of his manga since were horror comedy oneshots with crude humor and parody elements so when his face was published in an issue, readers were shocked by how he different he was from their expectations.

He started appearing in media in 1997 as the host of the radio show Seishun!! Tako Shōjo alongside voice actress Motoko Kumai. He debuted as a singer in 1999 and in 2001 was scouted by an agency and began his full-time career as a celebrity. His appearances on variety shows increased, and at peak he appeared on 255 TV shows a year, with a peak monthly income of 12 million yen and a peak savings of 65 million yen.

He has used okama-type language since his time as a radio show host and from around 2004 he started calling himself Onee (おネエ, lit. Sis) and established this persona, but Yamazaki himself has said that he felt uncomfortable with the stereotype of "effeminate = sarcastic and sharp-tongued" he had to perform, this and the stress of the amount of work he did himself and busy schedule led to his temporary hiatus.

In 2013, he held an exhibition featuring paintings of his favorite celebrities and in March 2025 he and Miyako Cojima, another horror comedy manga artist and a friend of his, held the exhibition Futari Jigoku (ふたり地獄, lit. 2 People's Hell).

== Works ==
His manga are known for their crude sense of humor and violent content. Moretsu Henshin!! Epiru-chan was marketed as a Neo-Horror-Gag by the publisher Soft Magic.

=== Manga ===
- Shikabane Shōjo (屍少女)
- Octopus Girl (戦慄!!タコ少女, Senritsu!! Tako Shōjo), 3 out of 4 volumes published for the North American market by Dark Horse in 2006.
- Moretsu Henshin!! Epiru-chan (モーレツ変身!!エピルちゃん)

=== Books ===
- Yamazaki Tooru Perfect Memoir (Leed Publishing, April 2000 ) ISBN 978-4845820412
- Dreams Come Tooru ( Nihon Bungeisha , September 2003 ) ISBN 978-4537251654
- Yamazaki Tooru no Kantan! Healthy! Mote Recipe ( Shogakukan , September 28, 2007 ) ISBN 978-4093483827

=== CD ===
- With Motoko Kumai
  - Open Your Heart (Sony Records, January 27, 1999)
  - Happy Song (Sony Records, July 28, 1999)
- Solo
  - Manatsu no Heart (Pony Canyon, July 16, 2003)
  - Watashi no Oasis (Pony Canyon, February 4, 2004)

=== Radio ===
- Seishun!! Tako Shōjo (Tokai Radio Broadcasting, December 7, 1997 – March 29, 2000)
- Yamai wa Chikara!!

=== TV shows ===
- Barairo no Seisen (TV Asahi, September–October 2011) as Hiro
- Narration for "Shiawase! Bonbi Girl" (Nippon TV)

=== Movie ===
- Drugstore Girl (2004) as Komatsu
- Rainbow Boys (2008) as Kazuo Mama
