= Sensei! Kuchisake-onna desu! =

- Japanese: 先生！口裂け女です！
- Directed by: Yu Nakamoto
- Screenplay by: Yu Nakamoto
- Starring: Taisei Kido; Reina Kurosaki; Gai Ueno; Hiroko Yashiki; Masanari Wada
- Distributed by: Extreme
- Release date: July 7, 2023
- Running time: 84 minutes
- Country: Japan
- Language: Japanese

Sensei! Kuchisake-onna desu! (先生！口裂け女です！; 'Teacher! It's the Kuchisake-onna!') is a 2023 Japanese horror film directed by Yu Nakamoto and starring Taisei Kido.

== Plot ==
High school students Takeshi (タケシ; played by Kido Taisei) and F1 (played by Ueno Kai) made money by stealing mopeds and selling them to a gang of delinquents led by Red King (レッドキング, Reddokingu; played by Shima Takeaki). Ayaka (アヤカ; played by Kurosaki Reina), a transfer student from Chiba, joined them, and the three attempted to steal a moped parked at a dilapidated apartment building. However, a masked woman (Yashiki Hiroko), presumably the owner, appeared, and the three were chased by her. The three escaped on a stolen scooter and motorcycle, but the masked woman chased after them at a comparable speed. Takeshi was caught by the masked woman, and when she removed her mask, he saw that her mouth was split in two.

After somehow escaping from the masked woman, the three wondered if she might be the "Kuchisake-onna" (Slit-Mouthed Woman), a legend from the Showa era. Meanwhile, news arrived that a first-year female student had gone missing from her high school, and Takeshi suspected it might be the work of the Slit-Mouthed Woman. Takeshi, accompanied by his sister Kaori (カオリ; played by Ririka), who practices martial arts, and the four of them headed to the apartment building to confront the Slit-Mouthed Woman. The Slit-Mouthed Woman was stronger than Takeshi expected, and he promised her he would return the scooter. He also learned that the Slit-Mouthed Woman wasn't a legendary monster, but that her mouth had been cut off by a past lover who committed domestic violence. Furthermore, the Slit-Mouthed Woman also practiced martial arts and had beaten up her lover. Takeshi became the Slit-Mouthed Woman's apprentice and began learning martial arts from her.

Last night, Takeshi sneaked into the warehouse that served as the Red King's hideout and retrieved the Slit-Mouthed Woman's scooter. However, he was spotted by a gang of delinquents, and the next day, Takeshi was summoned to the warehouse, beaten up, and demanded 500,000 yen. Takeshi tries to steal a large motorcycle to make money, but Ayaka and F1 refuse to help him. He tries to do it alone, but it doesn't work out, and he's discovered and reported. After being lectured by his father and placed under house arrest, Ayaka comes to see Takeshi and tells him that Red King has posted information on social media, complete with a picture, claiming that "Kuchisake-onna" (Slit-Mouthed Woman) is the culprit behind the kidnapping of a high school girl. To clear his name, Takeshi decides to find the real culprit. Takeshi's homeroom teacher, Saito (サイトー; played by Masahiro Wada), used to teach in Chiba when Ayaka lived there, and Ayaka remembers that a similar case of a high school girl going missing had occurred in Chiba as well. Suspicious of Saito, Takeshi tries calling Lisa, who is usually close to Saito and whom Takeshi has feelings for, but Lisa says she went to see a movie with Saito and is currently in Saito's room. Takeshi, Ayaka, and Kaori head to Saito's room.

F1 joins them, and while Saito is out, Takeshi and the others sneak into his room and discover the body of a missing high school girl and Lisa, who has been held captive. Saito returns to his room but flees upon seeing Takeshi and the others. At that moment, Takeshi receives an email from Red King on his smartphone. Takeshi's father had gone to the warehouse to confront Red King but was captured. Takeshi and Ayaka go to the warehouse to rescue their father but are ambushed and captured themselves. Just then, the "Slit-Mouthed Woman," summoned by F1, appears and eliminates Red King and the gang of delinquents. When Takeshi rescues his father, the "Slit-Mouthed Woman" is gone. She had pursued and killed Saito. The "Slit-Mouthed Woman" disappears to an unknown location.

Takeshi starts a part-time job delivering newspapers and decides to live a normal high school life.

== Cast and production crew ==
=== Cast ===
- Takeshi - Taisei Kido
- Ayaka - Reina Kurosaki
- F1 - Kai Ueno
- Kuchisake-onna - Hiroko Yashiki
- Ririka
- Homeroom Teacher Saito - Masanari Wada
- Naomasa Rokuhira
- Shigeo Osako

=== Production crew ===
- Director/Screenwriter - Yu Nakamoto
- Action Director - Koji Kawamoto
- Special Makeup Design/Special Effects Sculpting - Kakusei Fujiwara
- VFX Supervisor - Makoto Kamiya

== Production ==
In a 2023 interview, Hiroko Yashiki, who played the Kuchisake-onna, stated, "This film serves as my calling card. I don't mind if people associate 'Hiroko Yashiki' with the 'Slit-Mouthed Woman.'"

This film marks the first starring role for Taisei Kido. Reina Kurosaki and Gai Ueno were cast following an audition process.

Regarding the film, director Yu Nakamoto explained, "In an era where anti-lookism is spreading, I wanted to reflect the current zeitgeist by questioning whether it is right to treat someone like a monster simply because their mouth is slit."

== Release ==
The movie was released nationwide in Japan on June 7, 2023.
