= Takashi Watanabe =

Japanese anime director

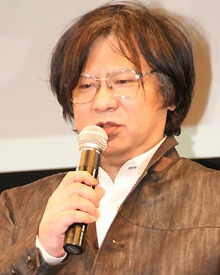
- Born: July 22, 1957 (age 68); Sapporo, Hokkaido, Japan
- Occupation: Director
- Known for: Slayers; Boogiepop Phantom; Shakugan no Shana

Takashi Watanabe (渡部 高志, Watanabe Takashi; born July 22, 1957) is a Japanese animator, storyboard artist, and director. He is best known for directing the anime series Slayers, Boogiepop Phantom, and Shakugan no Shana.

== Filmography ==
=== Director ===
- Aria the Scarlet Ammo
- Battle Skipper
- Boogiepop Phantom
- Dai-Shogun – Great Revolution
- Dangerous Jii-san Ja
- Demon King Daimao
- Freezing
- Heavy Object (chief director)
- How a Realist Hero Rebuilt the Kingdom
- Ikki Tousen
- Ikki Tousen Western Wolves
- Invincible King Tri-Zenon
- Karasu Tengu Kabuto
- Kino's Journey: Life Goes On
- Miracle Giants Dome-kun
- Lost Universe
- New Fist of the North Star
- Ogenki Clinic
- Rave Master
- Sanctuary
- Senran Kagura: Ninja Flash!
- Slayers series
- Shakugan no Shana series
- Space Pirate Mito
- Starship Operators
- Taboo Tattoo
- The Abashiri Family
- The Stories of Girls Who Couldn't Be Magicians (chief director)
- Ys (anime) (episodes 5-7)
- Ys II

== See also ==
- Hiroshi Watanabe
