= Taisei Kido =

Japanese actor (1996)

- Born: December 10, 1996 (age 29); Kitakyushu, Fukuoka Prefecture, Japan
- Occupation: Actor
- Years active: 2017–present
- Hometown: Yokohama, Kanagawa
- Agent: Tristone Entertainment

Japanese name
- Kanji: 木戸 大聖
- Hiragana: きど たいせい
Transcriptions
- Romanization: Kido Taisei

Taisei Kido (木戸 大聖(きど たいせい), Taisei Kidō; born December 10, 1996) is a Japanese actor.

== Biography ==
Kido was born on December 10, 1996 in Kitakyushu, Fukuoka Prefecture and raised in Yokohama City. His family consists of his mother, father, and a younger sister.

== Filmography ==
=== Film ===
| Year | Title | Role | Notes | Ref. |
|---|---|---|---|---|
| 2018 | Gintama 2: Rules Are Made to Be Broken | | | |
| 2019 | LDK: Two Loves Under One Roof | Takemura | | |
| 2020 | Our 30-Minute Sessions | | | |
| 2020 | Kotera-san Climbs! | Makabe | | |
| 2022 | What to Do with the Dead Kaiju? | Suda | | |
| 2022 | Mayhem Girls | Yusuke Suzuki | | |
| 2023 | Sensei! It's the Slit-Mouth Woman! | Takeshi | Lead role | |
| 2024 | The Colors Within | Rui Kagehara (voice) | Animated film | |
| 2025 | Yasuko, Songs of Days Past | Chūya Nakahara | | |
| 2025 | Ya Boy Kongming! The Movie | Young man | | |
| 2025 | Wind Breaker | Akihiko Nirei | | |
| 2026 | A Side Character's Love Story | Hiroki Irie | Lead role | |
| 2026 | Kill Your Tears, Okiharu | Okiharu Shizugawa | | |
| 2026 | My Crazy Feminist Girlfriend | Haruki Kimura | | |

=== Television ===
| Year | Title | Role | Notes | Ref. |
|---|---|---|---|---|
| 2017 | Fugitive Boys | | | |
| 2018 | Mob Psycho 100 | Miyabe | Episode 6 | |
| 2019 | It's an Easy Job. I Applied for It | | Episode 9 | |
| 2019 | The Protagonist | Masaru Wakatsuki | Web series | |
| 2020 | Special Cold Case Investigation | | Episode 6 | |
| 2020–21 | Memories: The Story of Nurses | Masahiro Akimura | | |
| 2021 | Ikemen!: My 3-Minute Boyfriend | Ayato | Episode 1 and 2 | |
| 2022 | Family Photo | Kazuya Nakagawa | | |
| 2022 | Escaped Baseball Player | Masao Endo | Lead role; short television film | |
| 2022 | Last One Standing | Wakadaigo | Episode 7 and 8 | |
| 2022 | Hotelier Katsuo Toudou's Case Files | Masaki Shinozaki | | |
| 2022 | First Love | Harumichi Namiki (young) | | |
| 2023 | What will you do on Saturday? | Yumi Uetsuji (voice) | Lead role | |
| 2023 | Draft King | Sho Kitabatake | Episode 5 and 6 | |
| 2023 | Our School Broadcast | Hiroya Konno | Lead role | |
| 2023 | Miss Yuria's Red Thread of Fate | Yuya Ban | | |
| 2024 | I Won a Big Prize | Akira Sinjo | Lead role | |
| 2024 | The Sun at the Expo | Teppei Kuramoto | Television film | |
| 2024 | 9 Border | Yota Takagi | | |
| 2024 | Where Does the Sea Begin | Yamato Tsukioka | | |
| 2024 | House of Ninjas | Kohei Kyotani | | |
| 2024 | The Beginning with My Brother | Yamato Tsukioka | Lead role | |
| 2025 | Vanilla Everyday | Akiyama Shizuka | | |

=== Music video appearances ===
| Year | Song | Artist | Notes | Ref. |
|---|---|---|---|---|
| 2025 | "Unrequited Love" | Super Beaver | | |

== Bibliography ==
=== Photobook ===
- Hana-Uta (July 2024, 7, Wanibooks ) ISBN 978-4-8470-8562-8

== Awards and nominations ==
| Year | Award | Category | Work(s) | Result | Ref. |
|---|---|---|---|---|---|
| 2025 | Elle Cinema Awards 2025 | ElleGirl Rising Star | Yasuko, Songs of Days Past | Won | |
