= Reiko the Zombie Shop =

Japanese manga series

- Cover of the first Japanese volume of Reiko the Zombie Shop as published by Bunkasha

ゾンビ屋 れい子 (Zombie-ya Reiko)
- Genre: Horror, action, shōjo
- Manga
- Written by: Rei Mikamoto
- Published by: Bunkasha
- English publisher: NA: Dark Horse
- Magazine: Horror M
- Original run: June 6, 1998 – March 6, 2004
- Volumes: 11

Reiko the Zombie Shop (Japanese: ゾンビ屋 れい子, Hepburn: Zombie-ya Reiko) is a 1998 Japanese shōjo manga series by Rei Mikamoto, chronicling the exploits of Reiko Himezono, a teenage necromancer-for-hire. Reiko is employed by bereaved families to resurrect departed loved ones for a short time, which would allow the dead to give closure on their death to the living.

Eleven tankoubon have been released by Bunkasha Comics, and were translated into English by Michael Gombos. Dark Horse published six volumes of the original 11 volumes.

Around 2004, The series was adapted into live action.

== Summary ==
=== Volume One ===
Reiko is introduced as a schoolgirl and a "zombie shop"; a professional necromancer who, for a substantial fee, reanimates the dead, for the purpose of obtaining information from them. This offers her an opportunity to work as a detective and solve murder cases by temporarily reviving the victim and asking them who killed them. In the introductory acts of the book, for instance, she resurrects a girl who committed suicide, who, unbeknownst to her mother, was being molested by her father. The zombified girl kills the father, followed by the mother paying Reiko double her prior fee to reanimate the father so she can torture him.

This volume is predominantly episodic format. These include a jealous killing among her circle of friends, an obsessive biology teacher attempting to bring back a beloved student, a tussle with bank robbers, and a stint as an unusual bodyguard for a dying rock star. Stories not featuring Reiko begin to appear, which cut away to the exploits of teenage serial killer Saki Yurikawa. Driven by a fanatical desire to have a younger sister to care for, Yurikawa kidnaps young girls and tries to force them into a sisterly role, but they inevitably end up fearing and hating her, causing her to become enraged and murder them. In the final chapters, Reiko and Yurikawa's paths converge when Reiko is called in to a hospital by the police to revive one of Yurikawa's victims. The young zombie goes berserk and tracks down Yurikawa, who happens to be in the hospital at the time with another girl. Reiko and Yurikawa fight; Reiko is killed, but, having anticipated this, manages to zombify herself with a tape-recorded incantation. She defeats Yurikawa, but not before being reduced herself to only a severed head, apparently lifeless.

=== Volume Two ===
After a chance confrontation between two opposing factions of necromancers, Reiko manages to attach her head to a freshly killed body, returning her to non-zombie status. She joins forces with a group of young zombie summoners, Yuki and Rudoh, who oppose the more malevolent majority consisting of a cult of necromancers led by Reiko's elder sister Riruka, who seeks "global zombification".

In this volume, a new element is introduced, whereby summoners each have a "faithful zombie" they can call forth to fight on their side. Reiko's faithful is a zombified Yurikawa, now mindlessly and speechlessly bound to Reiko's will. Along with the adversary Riruka, a new major ally is introduced in this volume – a mercenary named Jasmine, who interrupts a climactic fight scene to offer her skills to the highest bidder. Reiko rejects her steep asking price, but saves her life, thereby indebting her to her cause. The volume ends with Reiko and Jasmine fighting their way through Riruka's mansion, with one of Riruka's assistants having tricked Reiko's summoner friends into killing one another.

== Development and release ==
Reiko the Zombie Shop was written and illustrated by Rei Mikamoto. The "Zombie Shop" in the title "zombie shop" refers to the Japanese-English title zombie-ya, with ya referring to a "shop" or "dealer".

Comics creator and critic Jason Thompson also reflected that the comic was more similar to splatter films such as Re-Animator (1985) and Braindead (1992) than it was other horror-themed manga due to its pop culture references as well as the thick-lined artwork and extreme camera angles seen in American comics. Thompson continued that while the series initially was presented as a horror, he described its style becoming more of a "shonen-style action/fighting manga" as the series continued, comparing it to Pokémon and Shaman King.

Reiko the Zombie Shop was made for the shōjo magazine Horror M in Japan. The series was published in Japan from 1998 to 2004. At the 2005 San Diego Comic-Con, Dark Horse Comics announced they would release Reiko the Zombie Shop in English in December 2005. Dark Horse translated six out of the eleven volumes.

== Reception ==
In an overview of zombie-themed comics, Sam Costello of Rue Morgue complimented Mikamoto's art is detailed and unexpectedly gruesome while finding the series had "twisted, but occasionally silly, storylines."

Thompson wrote about the series in 2011 that his main issue with the comic was the over-the-top graphic violence and gore grew old with repeated scenes and that it made him appreciate other series such as Franken Fran more. He later included the series in his "10 Great Zombie Manga" article for the Anime News Network.
