= Studio Ironcat =

American publishing company

- 2003 Studio Ironcat logo
- Industry: Publishing
- Founded: 1997
- Founder: Kuni Kimura; Masaomi Kanzaki; Steve Bennett
- Defunct: 2006
- Headquarters: Fredericksburg, Virginia
- Products: Comics
- Website: Ironcat.com (archive)

Studio Ironcat was a small publishing company based in Fredericksburg, Virginia, dedicated to publication of manga and later, Amerimanga. The company is most known for its publication of the first volume of Megatokyo, a prominent webcomic, as well as the flamboyant style of one of its founders, Steve Bennett. The company was also known for regular turmoil within its wake, primarily during the years 2001–2003. One of these led to a period where the company did business under a different name as I.C. Entertainment.

The company, commonly referred to as "Ironcat", published under the Studio Ironcat, I.C. Entertainment and Fuzzy Kitten imprints. They also had an adult imprint, Sexy Fruit. Over the course of its lifespan, Studio Ironcat published over fifty titles.

== History ==
=== Founding years ===
From 1993 to 1997, Antarctic Press published several translated manga series, including Vampire Miyu and several miniseries by Ippongi Bang and her studio, Studio DoDo. However, facing declining sales and a change in the company's focus, Antarctic Press decided to cancel all of their translated manga titles in late 1997, laying off several employees in the process. One of the employees let go from Antarctic Press was head translator Kumi Kimura, who took several projects that had been in the planning stages to his new company, Studio Ironcat. Studio Ironcat was founded in 1997 by manga artists Kuni Kimura, Masaomi Kanzaki and Stephen R. Bennett IV. The new company started publication in January of the following year by releasing the Vampire Princess Miyu manga by Narumi Kakinouchi, then moving on to a series of other books under its Studio Ironcat and Sexy Fruit imprints. The company signed up other well-known artists and titles, working to become a strong player in the shōnen manga genre.

For the first few years of business, things were running somewhat smoothly, but this changed in 1999, with the first major problem for Ironcat.

=== Embezzlement and departure of co-founders ===
From its inception until 1999, there were financial issues with Kimura. A report by industry website Anime News Network (ANN) stated that a company employee reported multiple cases of fraud by Kimura, with the alleged cases of Ironcat funds being given to friends in Japan, took unauthorized trips to Thailand and frequently used company finances for personal expenses. The drain of funds was enough that the company ended up on shaky financial ground, and emptied Kanzaki (the primary financial backer)'s investment in the company.

During the post-Kimura restructuring by Kanzaki and the Bennetts, Office assistant Kathryn Hofer left in January 2000 due to lack of pay and bias treatment, Chief Graphics Designer and Copy Editor Mark Hofmann departed in June 2000, citing an issue with internal, "high-school" company politics and lack of pay. Hofer's and Hofman's grievances would later prove to be tragically prophetic, as later employee departures would cite the same problems.

=== Name change and employee departures ===
The Bennetts responded by renaming the company International Comics and Entertainment, but it is unclear if the name change was simply a DBA, or a change to evoke "Iron Cat Entertainment". For the most part, rebranding the company as I.C. Entertainment was cosmetic, as the company was still referred to as "Ironcat" during this period. In 2002, the company expanded its lineup to include shōjo manga titles, such as Central City and horror titles such as Mantis Woman. From this point on, a slow exodus of staff departed the company. Between May and August 2003, several key personnel departed the company, with one of the biggest departures occurring on July 31 (though not reported until October 6 of that year).

On October 6, 2003, Brown, Johnson, and Graphics Editor Ellen Ohlmacher gave an interview to ANN, accusing Bennett of denying pay to themselves and several other company employees. A follow-up report by ANN stated that "[f]inancial documents obtained by ANN demonstrate a three-month gap in one employee's payment from March 31 to July 3, followed in September by back pay of only one-third of the $1,800 the employee claims to be owed. The records also indicate other former employees have not received some or all of their claimed back pay." ANN later reported both Brown and Johnson eventually received full back pay as of October 27, though it is unknown if anyone else had received their missing pay.

As Ironcat's finances deteriorated and internal politics began to leak to the public, the company gained a reputation as a hotbed of "chaos", filled with "high-school politics" amongst staffmembers. At one point the company held a "Save Ironcat" sale at the 2003 Otakon anime convention. During this time, the company returned to the Studio Ironcat name in October 2003, having settled amicably with Kanzaki over the name and other issues.

=== Megatokyo and Amerimanga ===
By mid-2002, the decision was made to get into the growing Amerimanga trend pioneered by competitor Antarctic Press and made notable at the time by TOKYOPOP's Rising Stars of Manga contest and compilation. This was brought about by Ironcat's biggest coup, obtaining the publishing licenses for Megatokyo and Maelyn Dean's Real Life, two major webcomics. It also began publishing an Amerimanga anthology magazine called, fittingly, AmeriManga.

However, the Amerimanga ventures turned out to be disastrous. The first volume of Megatokyo, released in January 2003, was a bonafide hit, with the entire first printing selling out. Ironcat prepared for the release of the second volume when the publishing deal between Ironcat and Fred Gallagher, Megatokyo's creator, fell through. Gallagher would later write on the Megatokyo web site that the parting between him and Ironcat was amicable, though rumors had it that Bennett stated that Gallagher demanded more money for the license. However, many Megatokyo fans noted that Ironcat never shipped out many of their pre-orders for Vol. 1 and also insisted that fans pay in full for pre-orders on Vol. 2 when it had not even gone to press. Gallagher would eventually take Megatokyo to rival publisher Dark Horse Comics.

=== AmeriManga magazine and author strife ===
By June of that year, however, AmeriManga magazine had become the focal point of Ironcat's products and a modest hit, boasting 600 subscribers. However, at AnimeNEXT, on October 4 of that year, Bennett announced that AmeriManga would go on hiatus, and that it was awaiting responses from the represented artists before proceeding with plans for future issues.

However, while Ironcat had expressed an interest in continuing the series, it would have been difficult as Senior Editor Kei Blue had departed the company in July, and fourteen other AmeriManga artists followed suit. Blue told ANN that a clause specifying a timetable for product release and payment was included in the AmeriManga artists' contracts, and that when Ironcat failed to meet the timetable, the contracts were automatically voided. Afterwards, several artists publicly stated that they would not work with Ironcat again.

Additionally, Ironcat began to have problems with some of their other artists. The deal with Dean fell through, with Dean opting not to publish Real Life with Ironcat. A more public disagreement occurred when Bennett stated that Ironcat could not contact Japanese artist Saya, creator of Central City, blaming it on an ex-employee who allegedly took the artist's information. In turn, Saya made a public statement, voicing that she was easily able to be contacted via her website, that she had never received any payments from the company and that she would never work with Ironcat again. She also stated that Bennett "has no right to say this about his former employee. If they really wish to talk to me, my e-mail address is very easy to find because there were links from their former web page to mine."

== Attempted comeback ==
In late 2004, Ironcat signed artist Isabel Marks, licensing her webcomic Namir Deiter. For the launch, Ironcat created a third imprint, Fuzzy Kitten, as part of a planned imprint for furry-oriented comics. However, only one volume of Namir Deiter was released under this banner.

Namir Deiter came too late to help Ironcat. Deep in debt and unable to obtain additional capital, Ironcat was forced to cease printing its current properties and to decline options to license promising manga titles.

On January 28, 2005, Studio Ironcat closed operations and made a statement regarding this matter on their website. From that point, the Studio Ironcat website remained open with orders still being taken for present stock, but the site served as a clearing house for the remainder of Ironcat's published stock. On January 12, 2006, a notice was placed on the front page that the catalog was being sent to a liquidator for final dissolution of remaining stock. The site is now closed.

== Titles published by Studio Ironcat ==
Comics, listed by imprint, include:

=== Ironcat/I.C. Entertainment ===
- Iron Cat (from which the company took its name)
- Vampire Princess Miyu
- New Vampire Princess Miyu
- The Vampire Dahlia
- Vampire Yui
- Crusher Joe
- Central City (Released 2002, by Saya)
- Dragon Wars
- Futaba-kun Change! (Ironcat's flagship title for several years)
- Panku Ponk!
- Makuukan Zero
- You & Me (Released 2002, by Hiroshi Aro)
- Amerimanga (Magazine which serialized various series)
- MegaTokyo
- My Code Name is Charmer
- The Wanderer
- Cutie Honey '90
- Mantis Woman
- Hyper Doll
- Doctor! (Released 1997, by Ippongi Bang)
- Virtual Bang (Released 1998, by Ippongi Bang)
- Hanaukyo Maid Team
- No Bra ‹---(Not in any particular order of publishing. Also, was delayed indefinitely in October 2003)

=== Fuzzy Kitten ===
- Namir Deiter

=== SexyFruit ===
- Ogenki Clinic (Ironcat's best-known SexyFruit title)
- Cool Devices
- Bizzarian (Released 2000, by Senno Knife)
- Oh My! (Japanese title: いや！, Released 2002)
- Part Timer Rei (Licensed, but never released)
- Space Dreams (Released 1998, by Harumi Shimamoto)
- Bang's Sexplosion (Released 1999, by Ippongi Bang)
- Femme Kabuki (Released 1998)
- I Love You (Released 2003, by Lei Nekojima)
- Eden (Released 2002, by Senno Knife)
- Heart Core (Released 2002)
