= Blue Submarine No. 6 =

Japanese manga series & its adaptations

- Cover of the original manga

青の6号 (Ao no Roku-gō)
- Genre: Post-apocalyptic
- Manga
- Written by: Satoru Ozawa
- Published by: Shogakukan
- Magazine: Weekly Shōnen Sunday
- Original run: January 8, 1967 – November 5, 1967
- Volumes: 3
- Manga

AO6
- Written by: Satoru Ozawa
- Published by: Sekai Bunkasha
- Magazine: Sebun Comics
- Original run: June 1997 – November 1998
- Volumes: 5
- Original video animation
- Directed by: Mahiro Maeda
- Produced by: Kiyoshi Sugiyama; Shinji Nakajima; Tsunetoshi Koike (#1–2); Yutaka Yano (#1–3); Takao Nagayama (#4)
- Written by: Hiroshi Yamaguchi
- Music by: The Thrill
- Studio: Gonzo
- Licensed by: NA: Discotek Media
- Released: October 25, 1998 – March 25, 2000
- Runtime: 29–40 minutes (each)
- Episodes: 4
- Video game

Blue Submarine No. 6: Antarctica
- Developer: Bandai Visual
- Publisher: Bandai Visual
- Platform: PlayStation
- Released: JP: September 28, 2000
- Video game

Blue Submarine No. 6: Time And Tide
- Developer: Sega
- Publisher: Sega
- Platform: Dreamcast
- Released: JP: December 7, 2000

Blue Submarine No. 6 (Japanese: 青の6号, Hepburn: Ao no Roku-gō; lit. 'Blue No.6'), officially translated in Japan as Blue Sub 006, is a post-apocalyptic 3-volume manga series written and illustrated by Satoru Ozawa. The manga was published in 1967 by Shogakukan's Weekly Shōnen Sunday magazine.

When the OVA adaptation was announced by Gonzo, the manga was remade under the name AO6. It was published by Sekai Bunkasha and was serialized in Sebun Comics magazine in June 1997. The OVA series was released in 2000. The OVA had also received two video games for the PlayStation and Dreamcast.

== Plot ==
The story is set in the distant future, when the Earth's oceans have risen and flooded most of the sea-lying land on Earth.

The rogue scientist Zorndyke caused the flooding, which killed countless individuals, and most of humanity's remaining cities have been attacked or destroyed by Zorndyke's army of half-animal "hybrids". The remaining humans begin to wage war against Zorndyke's seagoing creations for survival. Humanity's best hope for a resolution to the conflict lies with its submarine forces, among which is the focus of the story, Blue Submarine #6. It is revealed that Zorndyke is attempting to decisively end the conflict in the favor of his hybrid children by artificially inducing a polar switch using geothermal energy at the South Pole.

== Characters ==
- Tetsu Hayami (速水 鉄, Hayami Tetsu): The lead protagonist who is a pilot for underwater vessels. He is contacted by Kino to help with the Blue Fleet operation.
- Mayumi Kino (紀之 真弓, Kino Mayumi): A young woman around 18 years of age who enlists Hayami to help the crew of Blue 6.
- Tokuhiro Iga (伊賀 徳洋, Iga Tokuhiro): The Captain of Blue 6. While serving in the Marine Self Defense Force Submarine Division, he became an alcoholic and his wife and child left him. He became an instructor at the International Naval Academy by swearing to give up drinking. He is a veteran of Musuca battles and has experience in fighting Verg. Understanding his former student; Tetsu Hayami's great abilities and seeing the need for them, he pushed him to rejoin Blue Fleet.
- Jung Zorndyke (ユング・ゾーンダイク, Yungu Zōndaiku): The antagonist of the story, who is supposed to be attempting to destroy humanity. He has created a series of hybrid creatures to carry out various tasks, known as the Army of Chiron. Many seem to have gone beyond his control, though they claim to be doing his will.
- Verg (ベルグ, Berugu): The "Admiral" of Zorndyke's navy. He is very prone to fits of anger and jealousy and even savagely attacks Mutio for interacting with a human. His biggest motivation appears to be his "Papa"'s approval, and he constantly seeks it by killing humans. He foolishly believes that humans make his "Papa" sad, and not the war(s) they are involved in.
- Mutio (ミューティオ, Myūtio): A member of the aquatic hybrid race created by Zorndyke (often referred to as nereids). She is saved by Hayami and she later returns the favor. She becomes an outcast due to her interactions with Hayami. Even though she was banished by Verg and brutally beaten by her sisters, she still consoles him in the last episode. This forgiving nature may have developed during her interactions with Hayami and the Musuca Red Spot, or because of her natural compassion. She is the only fish-woman seen with red eyes and red spots (as opposed to the normal blue), a rare sign of genetic diversity amongst her species in the series.
- Mei-ling Huang (黄 美鈴, Huáng Měi-líng):is a 10-year-old crew member who works with the sonar and communicates with Zorndyke's creatures. She is a child genius and a sonometer who uses the "Lorenzini System" included on the Blue Fleets Submarines. She is the sole member of Blue 6 who operates this system. She works in conjunction with Katsuma as guides for the crew. She was born and raised in a wealthy family. Her father is French and her mother is Vietnamese. Because she is gifted with extra sensory abilities, she was involved in a project at the Oceania Marine Development center. After the Zorndyke conflict began, Yamada saw her talent and had her join the Blue Fleet. Despite Huang's remarkable skills, she is still quite young and very emotionally frail, often time she is seen clutching her stuffed bear and is very disturbed by all the death that occurs during battle. She dislikes any kind of conflict and feels burdened by her psychic abilities.

=== Cast ===
Cast
Character	Japanese	English
Tetsu Hayami	Hodzumi Gouda	Michael Granberry
Mayumi Kino	Yukana Nogami	Pamela Weidner-Houle
Shidll Dedson	Unshou Ishidzuka	Boise Holmes
Tokuhiro Iga	Kinryuu Arimoto	Dave Underwood
Jung Zorndyke	Takeshi Wakamatsu	Michael S. Way
Verg	Shoutarou Morikubo	Scott Simpson
Mutio	Miki Nagasawa	Juliet Cesario
Mei-ling Huang	Ayaka Saitou	Danielle Sullivan

== Media ==
=== Manga ===
The original Blue Submarine No. 6 manga was written by Satoru Ozawa and serialized Shogakukan's Weekly Shōnen Sunday magazine from January 8 to November 5, 1967. Three tankōbon (collected chapter books) were released by Akita Shoten between March and August 1974. The manga was later remade under the title Blue Submarine No. 6 AO6 with cover illustrations provided by Kazutaka Miyatake to complement the OVA adaptation. This version was published by Sekai Bunkasha and serialized in Sebun Kansha magazine. The new manga series has been collected into five volumes and republished in a two volume kanzenban format released October 1999. Another two-volume collection was released on June 20, 2011.

Ao no Roku-gō

No.	Release date	ISBN
1	March 1974	9784253014762
1. Musuka Raigeki-sen no maki (ムスカ雷撃戦の巻, Musuka's Lightning War Chapter); 2. Roku-gō tōjō!! (6号登場!!, No.6 Appears!!); 3. Kaisen Arawaru!! (怪潜あらわる!!, Kaisen Appears!!); 4. Furippā no Tōin (フリッパーの東員, Toin's Flipper); 5. Makkusu (マックス, Max); 6. Berugu shōsa (ベルグ少佐, Major Berg); 7. Ao-gō shūketsu (青号集結, Blue No. Gathering); 8. Pairon-gō (パイロン号); 9. Nokotta isseki (残った一せき, One Seat Remaining); 10. Raibaru (ライバル, Rival); 11. Yamato Wandā no maki (ヤマトワンダーの巻, Yamato Wonder Chapter)
2	July 1974	9784253014779
12. Ā Yamato! (ああヤマト!, Oh Yamato!); 13. Makkusu tōjō!! (マックス登場!!, Max Appears!!); 14. Hōtō gyorai (砲塔魚雷, Torpedo Turret); 15. Saibōgu (サイボーグ, Cyborg); 16. Yamato hakken (ヤマト発見, Yamato Discovery); 17. Yamato no Taiketsu (ヤマトの対決, Confrontation of Yamato); 18. Ao Roku yabureru (青6破れる); 19. Sora kara no kōgeki (空からの攻撃, Attacks From the Sky)
3	August 1974	9784253014786
Ao no Roku-gō (青の6号, Blue No.6); 21. Honkyoku osowaru!! (本局襲わる!!, Osowaru Headquarters!!); 22. Oshidasareta Ao Roku (おしだされた青6, The Extruded Blue 6); 23. B-gō pusshu (B号プッシュ); 24. Fujō shita honkyoku (浮上した本局, Headquarters has Emerged); 25. Namida no saikai (涙の再会, Reunion of Tears); 26. Himitsu keikaku (秘密計画, Secret Plan); 27. Makkusu metsubō (マックス滅亡, Max Destruction); D Rain (Dライン, D Line); 28. Raigeki-sen yōi (雷撃戦用意, Lightning Warfare); 29. Shitō (死闘, Mortal Combat); 30. Shukumei (宿命, Fate)

No.	Title	Release date	ISBN Ao no Roku-gō AO6
1	Sōgū-hen (遭遇編)	June 1997	9784418975174
2	Kakutō-hen (格闘編)	September 1997	9784418975181
3	Kaisen-hen (会戦編)	November 1997	9784418975211
4	Gekisen-hen (激戦編)	March 1998	9784418975297
5	Sōryoku-hen (総力編)	November 1998	9784418985142

=== OVA ===
The OVA version was directed by Mahiro Maeda, written by Hiroshi Yamaguchi, and character designs provided by Range Murata and Takuhito Kusanagi. It uses a hybrid approach, combining 3D computer graphics with traditional animation (digital ink and paint), and is a pioneering example of this technique. The jazzy and atmospheric score was provided by rock n' roll big band The Thrill.

The OVA adaptation was released in the United States on April 4, 2000. Bandai Entertainment originally announced that it would air on July 8, 2000, on Cartoon Network's Toonami block, however, Toonami had made no confirmation. Bandai then confirmed that it was delayed until October due to production issues, originally planned to air from October 16 to October 19, 2000. It would finally premiere in the United States on Cartoon Network's Toonami block from November 6 to November 9, 2000.

A DVD box set was released in Japan titled Blue Submarine No. 6 Blue Fleet Box (青の6号 BLUE FLEET BOX, Ao no Roku-gō Blue Fleet Box). The box set contained 3 discs with the first two containing two episodes each. The third disc contains interviews from Satoru Ozawa, Mahiro Maeda along with the OVA staff, trailers and interviews for the PlayStation video game Blue Submarine No. 6: Antarctica.

The anime was initially licensed by Bandai Entertainment until their shutdown in 2012. Discotek Media has since licensed the OVA and re-released on DVD and Blu-ray on September 24, 2013. However, issues were raised when Discotek Media accidentally added in the dub of the Toonami version. Discotek stated that the dub was received from the Blue Fleet box set in which uses the dub of the Toonami version with some modifications to fit into Cartoon Network's standards and practices. Discotek continues to state that they were unaware of there being two versions and will release a single disc DVD with the original dub from Bandai Entertainment along with Japanese Audio and subtitles in 2015. They would eventually release the series on a single-disc DVD on May 31, 2016. It is a bare-bones release, however it comes with both versions of the dub, as well as DTS and Dolby Digital 5.1 audio on the Japanese track.

No.	Title	Original release date	Ref.
1	"Blues"	October 25, 1998	
After getting reluctantly recruited into the blue sub fleet no.6 again, hayami and kino fight their first salvo against the minions of zorndycke and hayami rescues one of the enemy pilots, a humanoid mermaid, much to kino's chagrin.
2	"Pilots"	February 25, 1999	
After that, the commander virg's forces immediately attack the blue fleet. They escape with the sacrifice of a companion ship. The blue 6 then goes to novo base, where they were planning the combined attack on zorndycke's antarctica base, when suddenly Zorndycke crashes their video conference and proclaims that the inevitable destruction must come as a natural process and starts an all-out-assault in the base. Hayami after seeing the mutated body of a friend of his who was reportedly the only one to escape zorndycke's antarctica base, he initiates a daring charge at the attacking forces and has to be saved by that humanoid mermaid he saved before.
3	"Hearts"	August 25, 1999	
After hayami is saved and cared for by the humanoid mermaid creature now named as muitio, another sympathetic mutating whale-like creature appears, escorting the duo to the remainder of the submarine fleet, still intent on carrying out the mission. There, upon boarding it, hayami appeals to the commander iga to not approach this mission with murderous intent. But, reasonably so, the commander thinks that the time for that has long past.
4	"Minasoko"	March 25, 2000	
With the remainder of the blue submarine fleet were engaging in one final showdown with the phantom ship and all its associated goons, hayami and kino go to Zorndycke's lush vegetation-abundant lair filled with mutated creatures. There they learn of the reason of zorndycke's actions, how everything got way out of his hands and also the fact that unless they stop the launch of the nukes, the resultant polar shift will be ever more disastrous. Kino gets the message across to them and they all stand down. Except for virg, who after being defeated would be furiously charging towards the duo, but after he also sees the similarity between the two sides, he would be retreating.

=== Music ===
Two soundtracks for the OVA have been released. The first soundtrack is titled Blue Submarine No.6 Original Soundtrack Part.1 (青の6号 オリジナル・サウンドトラック Part.1, Ao no 6-gō Original Soundtrack Part.1) and was released on October 28, 1998. The second soundtrack is titled Blue Submarine No. 6 Original Soundtrack Part.2 (青の6号 オリジナル・サウンドトラック Part.2, Ao no 6-gō Original Soundtrack Part.2) and was released on April 28, 1999.

=== Video games ===
Two Japan-exclusive video games based on the Blue Submarine No. 6 OVA have been released. The first is titled, Blue Submarine No. 6: Antarctica (青の6号 Antarctica,, Ao no Roku-gō: Antarctica), and was developed and published by Bandai Visual for the PlayStation and released on September 28, 2000. A soundtrack sharing the same name of the video game was released on July 28, 2000.

The second video game titled, Blue Submarine No.6: -Time and Tide- (青の6号 歳月不待人 -TIME AND TIDE-,, Ao no Roku-gō: Saigetsu Fumachibito -Time and Tide-; literally "Blue No. 6: Inactive Time -Time and Tide-") was developed and published by Sega for the Dreamcast on December 7, 2000.

=== Planned live-action film ===
In 2005, Shōji Murahama of Gonzo stated with NewWords Magazine that a live-action Blue Submarine No. 6 film will be produced for approximately 10 billion yen (US$84 Million). Masahiko Ōkura has been confirmed to direct the movie. This is to be G.D.H.'s first live-action project with 30 more live-action projects under consideration. However, since the announcement, there has been no news nor reports of any progress.

== Reception ==
Eric Luce of Ex criticized the second manga for its characters and pacing stating: "This manga moves so slowly, one is tempted just to skip pages at a time to find a scene where something is happening. The characters seem to exist without a past so they lack any real depth".

The Blue Submarine No. 6 OVA was ranked as the 70th best anime of all time by the Japanese magazine Animage. It was ranked 25th best anime of all time by Wizard's Anime Invasion. The Society for the Promotion of Japanese Animation awarded the it "Best OVA, U.S. Release" for 2000.

Anime News Network praised the OVA for its animation stating: "Oceanscapes are beautifully rendered, aircraft looks extremely realistic, and the underwater fighting is simply breathtaking". However criticized the characters stating: "The characters, although nicely designed, are sparsely drawn and shaded, and there is absolutely no personality to them whatsoever". Eric Luce also praised the graphics and animation stating: "The producers of this show are pushing many boundaries in composition and editing. [sic] this show is probably one of the best uses so far of integrating the two". Bryce Coulter of Mania criticized the plot stating: " The flashy production and great musical score doesn't mean a whole lot without a decent plot. Blue Submarine No. 6 tends to ride the fence in this area". Carlos Ross of THEM Anime Reviews initially praised the series for its graphics, plot and characters. However a decade after the review and CGI and cel shading became the norm in animation, he updated his review criticizing the characters and plot. He had since referred it as a transition between classic "acetate age" and the modern computerized form of Japanese animation.

For the Blu-ray release of the OVA, Anime News Network gave a more positive review stating: "Despite some dated-looking CG, on the whole Blue Submarine No. 6 stands up surprisingly well. Its writing flaws may have become more apparent over time, but it can still be a thrilling view and its roughly 120 minute total length keeps the story so compact that viewers do not have much opportunity to get bored". Helen McCarthy in 500 Essential Anime Movies claimed that anime had "an interesting story, beautifully animated, with some jaw-droppingly good design concepts". She praised the characters design, especially Zorndyke's and stated that director Maeda "is one of the most imaginative visualists in anime".

The Encyclopedia of Science Fiction in 2021 noted that Blue Submarine No. 6, one of the earliest anime to make extensive use of CGI, was warmly received on release, but opined that while some visual sequences remained impressive, others have aged poorly and now look low-budget. It also criticized the story as rushed and insufficiently explained, particularly finding Zorndyke's motivations unclear, and noted that its treatment of geomagnetic reversal and mass extinction concepts reflected outdated science inherited from the 1967 source manga. The entry author interpreted Zorndyke as the mad scientist archetype, drawing deliberate parallels with Doctor Moreau from The Island of Doctor Moreau and Kurtz from Heart of Darkness. In the end, theey considered the series an exciting watch.

== See also ==
- For another anime about a "blue" submarine battleship, see Space Carrier Blue Noah or Arpeggio of Blue Steel.

== Related links ==
- (in Japanese)
- Blue Submarine No. 6 (manga) at Anime News Network's encyclopedia
- SEGA-SKY Dreamcast game review (Polish) and Rolly & RafaMGam English Translation Patch published
