= Even If You Slit My Mouth =

Japanese manga series

- First tankōbon volume cover

口が裂けても君には (Kuchi ga Saketemo Kimi ni wa)
- Genre: Dark fantasy; Romantic comedy
- Manga
- Written by: Akari Kajimoto
- Published by: Shueisha
- Imprint: Jump Comics+
- Magazine: Shōnen Jump+
- Original run: November 10, 2020 – December 19, 2023
- Volumes: 11

Even If You Slit My Mouth (口が裂けても君には, Kuchi ga Saketemo Kimi ni wa) is a Japanese manga series written and illustrated by Akari Kajimoto. It was serialized on Shueisha's Shōnen Jump+ manga service from November 2020 to December 2023.

The manga is based on the legend of Kuchisake-onna, a monstrous woman in Japanese folklore said to have scars on the sides of her mouth. It is Kajimoto's third romance manga based on Kuchisake-onna; she had previously released the one-shot Her Special Seat in 2017, and three-issue series Even If You Avoid the Slit in 2018. The latter shares the same Japanese name as Even If You Slit My Mouth and features alternate versions of the same characters.

== Premise ==
Miroku, a notorious yōkai known for her slit mouth, has felt her powers wear down in recent years as the public's belief in the supernatural has declined. To save herself, she must submit to an arranged marriage with Koichi Sano, the son of a human family charged with aiding supernatural beings. Miroku strikes a deal with Koichi to call off the engagement if she is able to scare him before his eighteenth birthday, but she must go through with the wedding if she falls in love with him.

== Publication ==
Written and illustrated by Akari Kajimoto, Even If You Slit My Mouth was serialized on Shueisha's Shōnen Jump+ manga service from November 10, 2020, to December 19, 2023. Its chapters were collected into eleven tankōbon volumes from March 4, 2021, to April 4, 2024.

=== Volume list ===
No.	Release date	ISBN
1	March 4, 2021	978-4-08-882619-6
2	June 4, 2021	978-4-08-882668-4
3	September 3, 2021	978-4-08-882776-6
4	December 3, 2021	978-4-08-882850-3
5	April 4, 2022	978-4-08-883078-0
6	August 4, 2022	978-4-08-883169-5
7	December 2, 2022	978-4-08-883359-0
8	March 3, 2023	978-4-08-883477-1
9	July 4, 2023	978-4-08-883629-4
10	November 2, 2023	978-4-08-883741-3
11	April 4, 2024	978-4-08-883761-1

== Reception ==
Danny Guan of Game Rant ranked Even If You Slit My Mouth third on a list of the best romance manga concluding in 2023.
