= Ogenki Clinic =

Japanese manga series

- Advertising flyer for Ogenki Clinic

お元気クリニック (Ogenki Kurinikku)
- Genre: Erotica, Comedy
- Manga
- Written by: Haruka Inui
- Published by: Akita Shoten
- English publisher: I.C. Entertainment/Studio Ironcat
- Magazine: Play Comic
- Original run: 1987 – 1994
- Volumes: 9
- Original video animation
- Directed by: Takashi Watanabe
- Studio: AC Create; Akita Shoten
- Licensed by: NA: Anime18 Kitty Media
- Released: 1991
- Episodes: 3
- icon

Ogenki Clinic (お元気クリニック, Ogenki Kurinikku) is a 1987 Seinen manga series by Haruka Inui which was originally published in Play Comic. The manga was adapted into an anime OVA series. There was also a live-action version, Welcome to Ogenki Clinic. The plotline revolves around the quirky (and perpetually horny) Doctor Sawaru Ogenki and his beautiful nurse, the busty Ruko Tatase, who help patients through their problems, and the cure almost always involves sex (something Ogenki doesn't approve on too well).

Ogenki Clinic is an erotic comedy that often employed visual metaphors for the doctor's cures. Referring to sexual intercourse as a game of pinball, or illustrating a penis as an actual missile or gun are just a few examples of the manga's humorous scenes.

== Manga ==
No.	Original release date	Original ISBN	English release date	English ISBN
1		4-253-06808-1		1-929090-09-9
2	—	4-253-06809-X	—	1-929090-14-5
3	—	4-253-06810-3	—	1-929090-20-X
4	—	4-253-06811-1	—	1-929090-29-3
5	—	4-253-06942-8		
6	—	4-253-06943-6	—	1-929090-62-5
7	—	4-253-06944-4	—	1-929090-80-3
8	—	4-253-06945-2	—	1-929090-81-1
9	—	4-253-06946-0	—	1-932575-19-7

== Anime ==
The anime OVA series of Ogenki Clinic was directed by Takashi Watanabe, animation by Chuo Movie and animation production by New Network and Tokyo Kids. It was first released in Japan in 1991 on three 46-minute VHS volumes by Play Comic Video. Simply titled "Vol. 1", "Vol. 2" and "Vol. 3", each volume contained four episodes or "cases".

The first two volumes, dubbed in English, were released separately on 45-minute VHS tapes in America by Anime 18 as Check Into Ogenki Clinic and Return to Ogenki Clinic, then together in 1999 as a single 90-minute DVD release titled "Ogenki Clinic Adventures". In 2007, they would be separated again for DVD release under Central Park Media's Anime HotShots banner as Ogenki Clinic 1 and Ogenki Clinic 2. Critical Mass Video has scheduled the re-release the Ogenki Clinic Adventures DVD for February 2, 2010.

Kitty Media released "Vol. 3" in America in 1997 on 45-minute English subtitled and dubbed VHS releases titled "Welcome to Ogenki Clinic". These VHS tapes were also included by Kitty Media in their VHS box sets of The Best of Kitty Vol. 2 in 2000, which also contained the anime OVAs Slight Fever Syndrome and Balthus - Tia's Radiance. (The DVD release of The Best of Kitty Vol. 2 does not contain Welcome to Ogenki Clinic, nor Slight Fever Syndrome, which were replaced by the anime OVAs Wake Up! Aria and The Legend of Reyon.)

In 1988, Mototsugu Watanabe made a live-action produced by Nikkatsu.

== See also ==
- The Joy of Sex
