= Gakkō de Atta Kowai Hanashi =

1995 video game

- Super Famicom cover art
- Developer: Pandora Box
- Publisher: Banpresto
- Platforms: Super Famicom, PlayStation
- Release: Super Famicom: JP: August 4, 1995; PlayStation: JP: July 19, 1996
- Genre: Visual novel
- Mode: Single-player

Gakkō de Atta Kowai Hanashi (Note: Japanese: 学校であった怖い話; lit. Schoolhouse Horror Story) is a visual novel for the Super Famicom that was released in 1995 by Banpresto in Japan. The in-game graphics make use of digitized photographs.

In 1996, a remake for the PlayStation Gakkō de Atta Kowai Hanashi S, was released. It featured improved graphics, full motion video, and an expanded story.

The game was developed by Pandora Box (game developer), a studio founded by game designer and scenario writer Takeo Iijima. The characters and setting would later be used in the Apathy franchise of Visual and Sound Novel games.

== Gameplay ==
In the game you play as a reporter for the school paper, writing a story about the 7 School Mysteries. Each mystery is told to you by one of 6 possible other students. As you make your way through each scenario, you are given choices which will change the outcome of the story and therefore your progression through the game. Including hidden stories, there are more than 50 possible scenarios in the game.

== Characters ==
=== Main characters ===
- Shuichi Sakagami (坂上 修一 Sakagami Shuichi)
- Emi Kurata (倉田 恵美 Kurata Emi)
- Mayumi Taguchi (田口 真由美 Taguchi Mayumi)

=== Six talkers ===
- Makoto Shindou (新堂 誠 Shindou Makoto)
- Shouji Arai (荒井 昭二 Arai Shouji)
- Nozomu Kazama (風間 望 Kazama Nozomu)
- Tomoharu Hosoda (細田 友晴 Hosoda Tomaharu)
- Akemi Iwashita (岩下 明美 Iwahita Akemi)
- Reiko Fukuzawa (福沢 玲子 Fukuzawa Reiko)

=== Other key characters ===
- Sadao Hino (日野 貞夫 Hino Sadao)
- Sanae Motoki (元木 早苗 Motoki Sanae)
- Kuroki (黒木 Kuroki)

== Release and reception ==
Reception

Review scores
Publication	Score	
Publication	PS	SNES
Famicom Tsūshin	7/10, 5/10, 6/10, 5/10	8/10, 6/10, 6/10, 5/10
PlayStation Magazine	20.8/30	22.3/30

Gakkō de atta Kowai Hanashi was released in Japan for the Super Famicom on August 4, 1995. On release, Famicom Tsūshin reviewers were mixed on whether the stories were appropriately scary or not, with one reviewer saying only the faces of the people in the game were scary. One reviewer said it was inferior to Chunsoft's Otogirisō (1992) and Banshee's Last Cry (1994) while and another said they wished the developers had focused more on the games sound effects.

The game was ported to the PlayStation in Japan and released on July 19, 1996 as Gakkō de atta Kowai Hanashi S (学校であった怖い話S; "Schoolhouse Horror Story S"). This version of the game had additional narrative paths and allows the player to choose the gender of the main character.

== Franchise ==
An anthology manga called Comic Hen Gakkō de Atta Kowai Hanashi was made to promote the game, featuring popular horror mangaka of the time. The contents have little to do with the game.

A sister game, Tsukikomori, was released on the Super Famicom in 1996, using the same gameplay and art style.

In 2007, a visual novel remake of the game, Apathy - Gakkō de Atta Kowai Hanashi ~Visual Novel Version~, was released. Under a new studio name, Nana Korobi Hachi Korogari, Apathy would become its own franchise of visual novels.

Since 2007, a number of novels and two volumes of a manga have been released in the Gakkō de Atta franchise.

== Legacy ==
The Super Famicom version of the game was later released on the Virtual Console service for the Wii and Wii U in Japan on August 5, 2008, and on August 27, 2014. The PlayStation version was also re-released on the PlayStation Network.
