= Noroi Michiru =

Japanese manga artist

- 呪 みちる
- Known for: Horror manga
- Awards: 3rd Inuki Award 1998 Honorable Mention
- Website: Noroi Michiru Home Page

Noroi Michiru (呪みちる) is a Japanese manga artist specialized in horror. His debut horror story won the 3rd Inuki Award in February 1998 issue of Kyōfu no Yakata DX.

The first part of his penname is derived from the Japanese word for curse (呪, Noroi)

== History and overview ==
When he was in junior high school, he was influenced by Hideshi Hino's manga Zoroku's Strange Disease which his younger brother had bought for him. After dropping out of college, he began submitting manga in earnest while working a part-time job, and started out as a comedy manga artist for Young Animal in 1996. In 1998, he switched to being a horror manga artist with "The Girl in the Clock Mansion" which won an award, the short story had themes of lesbianism and transhumanism.

Since then, Noroi Michiru mostly published in josei and shōjo horror anthologies and magazines. He often uses urban legends as basis for his short stories. He believes that the appeal of horror for teen girls is because its at that age people begin to become aware of their relationship to society and their own bodies, and horror answers the mysteries and absurdities of life.

His artwork was featured in the 2007 black comedy film Funuke Show Some Love, You Losers! The depictions of horror seen in his manga have received praise from Junji Ito, Ito describes Noroi as one of his favorite artists.

The 2 part collection of early works Noroi Michiru Shoki Kessakusen is being released in English by Star Fruit Books with the title of The Horrors of Noroi Michiru. The French edition of Noroi Michiru Shoki Kessakusen features introductions written by Junji Ito and Miyako Cojima and an interview.

He is a friend of fellow horror artist Misao Inagaki and he sometimes holds events alongside her.

== Books ==
1. Aozora no Akuma Enban, Soft Magic, 2001 (青空の悪魔円盤)
2. Oshiire no Woolly, Soft Magic, 2001 (押入れのウーリー)
3. Kuchisake Onna Arawaru!, Bunkasha, 2008 (口裂け女あらわる!)
4. Lion no Kubi, Trash-up, 2013 (ライオンの首)
5. The Horrors of Noroi Michiru I, Trash-up, 2014 (人造人間の怪 呪みちる初期傑作選I)
6. The Horrors of Noroi Michiru II, Trash-up, 2015 (火星高校の夜 呪みちる初期傑作選II)
7. Kao-biru / Mayonaka no Bus Ramen, Trash-up, 2018 (顔ビル/真夜中のバスラーメン)
8. Mantra, Kugi Shōbo, 2024 (マントラ)
