= Mori Kanda =

Japanese manga artist

- 神田森莉
- Born: December 3, 1963 (age 62); Otaru, Japan
- Known for: Horror manga Electronic Music

Mori Kanda (神田森莉, Kanda Mori, born December 3, 1963) is a Japanese musician and manga artist known for his horror manga that mix splatter and comedy horror.

== Biography ==
He grew up in a single-parent household. As a child, he loved the shōjo magazines his grandmother picked up from the trash dump, and he aspired to be a shōjo manga artist until he was 25, but was unable to make his debut. Mori began submitting manga to ladies' comics magazines instead.

In 1989, he made his debut with Kasakura Shuppansha's josei thriller and mystery manga magazine "Labien" (ラビアン, Rabian) with the oneshot Black Coffee in Bed (ブラックコーヒーインベッド, Burakku Kōhī in Beddo.) He gained popularity in the early 90s due to his appearances in Horror M and Kyōfu no Yakata DX, his violent and humorous splatter horror comedies separated him from other artists in the genre. In 1997 he made a pamphlet manga adaptation of Frank Grow's Love God.

After the horror boom's end, Mori has faced financial difficulties as his style of manga nowadays is niche and not marketable, he has even had to make erotic manga for men and lives with the help of his wife.

Even though his usual style is characterized by absurd and humorous extreme violence, he has also made manga based on people's real supernatural experiences.

In 2001 the label Inundō released the CD album Antonio Seishun no Alien SEX Taiken (アントニオ青年のエイリアンSEX体験) and in 2013, Attack of the Killer Hamster was released by Monofonus Press.

He has established a private publishing company, Kanda Mori Publishing (Hamster Books) to publish e-books. Mori also secretly runs an adult video site.

== Books ==
1. Kaiki Kaeru-hime (Bunkasha, September 1994) ISBN 978-4-8211-9415-5
2. Kaiki Miira Shojo (LEED, April 1995) ISBN 978-4-8458-1143-4
3. 37564 Gakuen (Bunkasha, August 1995) ISBN 978-4-8211-9443-8
4. Shojo Domei (Bunkasha, August 1996) ISBN 978-4-8211-9492-6
5. Honto ni Atta Osoroshii Hanashi (Somasha, October 1996) ISBN 978-4-916124-09-8
6. Hakaba Kyoshitsu (LEED, August 1997) ISBN 978-4-8458-1411-4
7. The Horror Specialist (KADOKAWA, December 1, 1997; January 8, 1998; January 30th, 1998) Volumes 1–3
8. Kani-Onna (Bunkasha, February 1998) ISBN 978-4-8211-9655-5
