= Suspiria (magazine) =

Japanese manga magazine

Suspiria Mystery
- Categories: Horror, mystery, shōjo manga
- Frequency: Monthly (1987-2006, 2010–2012) Bimonthly (2006-2010)
- First issue: February of 1987
- Final issue: August of 2012
- Company: Akita Shoten
- Country: Japan
- Language: Japanese

Suspiria Mystery (サスペリアミステリー), formerly Suspiria (サスペリア) was a bimonthly horror and mystery manga magazine published by Akita Shoten. It was named after the 1977 horror film Suspiria. It had a sister magazine Gakuen Mystery (学園ミステリー), published on the 20th of even-numbered months, and the special issues Horror Suspiria DX (ホラーサスペリアDX) and ZOKZOK (ゾクゾク). Manga serialized in Suspiria were originally published in the Horror Comics imprint, and later in the Suspiria Mystery Comics imprint.

== History ==
The magazine was founded in 1987 as a special issue of Hitomi during a boom in horror magazines aimed at girls in Japan which was started by the magazine Gekkan Halloween.

Even though it was a horror magazine, it had a focus on suspense stories; specially the popular Vampire Princess Miyu that attracted readers from outside the horror genre, these circumstances caused the magazine to shift to mostly feature mystery series and novel adaptations by the end of the horror boom in the 90s, its name was changed to Suspiria Mystery in 2001 to better match the content.

In 2006 it became a bimonthly magazine and works such as Quilt and Hengen Taima Yako Karura Mau were moved to other magazines to completely renew it as a mystery magazine. It came back to a monthly schedule in 2010.

The magazine was discontinued in the special October 2012 issue, which was actually released in August, bringing to a close its 25-year history since its first publication.

== Notable manga artists featured ==
- Kanako Inuki
  - Presents
  - Kyoufu Marchen
- Narumi Kakinouchi
  - My Code Name is Charmer
  - Vampire Princess Miyu
- Ochazukenori
  - Kyoufu Jikkenshitsu
  - Channel O
- Senno Knife
  - Shitarou-kun
  - Chizuru Kitan
- Hideshi Hino
  - Gakuen Hyaku Monogatari
- Miyuki Takahashi
  - Akuma no Mokushiroku
  - Quilt
- Koga Shin'ichi
  - Eko Eko Azarak II
- Takakazu Nagakubo
  - Shin Hengen Taima Yako Karura Mau
- Yoshimi Seki
  - Kaoru Shinjitsu
- Paja
  - Gakkou no Kaidan: Abunai Jokyōshi-hen
- Masako Tsukimori
  - Dark Butterfly
- Osada Not
  - Yaneura no Sanposha
  - Jikken' Oh
- Chieko Hara
  - Elfin Ring
  - Medical Countdown
- Madoka Kawaguchi
- Matsuri Akino
- Minoru Kuroda
- Motoko Fujita
- Akira Ōtsuka
- Iku Oyamada
