= Submarine 707 =

Japanese manga series

- Cover of the DVD of the OVA Submarine 707R

サブマリン707 (Sabumarin 707)
- Manga
- Written by: Satoru Ozawa
- Published by: Shogakukan
- Magazine: Weekly Shōnen Sunday
- Original run: 1963 – 1965
- Volumes: 6
- Original video animation

Submarine 707: Deep Sea Fleet
- Directed by: Teruo Kogure
- Produced by: Noriko Nishino
- Written by: Hideyuki Matsubara
- Music by: Masakuni Kikuchi
- Studio: Knack Productions
- Released: 10 January 1997
- Runtime: 45 minutes
- Original video animation

Submarine 707R
- Directed by: Shōichi Masuo
- Written by: Hiroshi Ōnogi
- Music by: Yutaka Minobe; Hideaki Kobayashi
- Studio: Group TAC
- Licensed by: NA: Geneon USA; UK: Manga Entertainment
- Released: 26 September 2003
- Runtime: 45 minutes (each)
- Episodes: 2

Submarine 707 (サブマリン707, Sabumarin 707) is a Japanese manga series written and illustrated by Satoru Ozawa and serialized in Weekly Shōnen Sunday between 1963 and 1965. The manga series was adapted into two original video animations (OVA). The first OVA, titled Submarine 707: Deep Sea Fleet (深海の艦隊 サブマリン707, Shinkai no Kantai: Sabumarin 707), was produced by Knack Productions and released on 10 January 1997. The second OVA, titled Submarine 707R (サブマリン707R, Sabumarin 707R), consisted of two episodes produced by Group TAC and was released between 26 September 2003 and 28 April 2004.

== Plot ==
In the near future, the world is at war: the USR (the Undersea Silence Revolution or Underwater Silence Revolution), a mysterious organization led by Admiral Red and his powerful submarine UX, wants to stop human exploitation of the seas, using cutting-edge technology to torpedo and sink many ships and ports. The world's navies unite and form the Peace-Keeping Navy (PKN) to fight against the "terrorists". Every major UN member contributes a submarine, although the Japanese entry is an old clunker, the diesel sub 707 commanded by Captain Youhei Hayami. When the inaugural meeting finally begins, Admiral Red and the UX come to disrupt the meeting with a spread of torpedoes; due to a lack of command procedure and an unwise tight grouping of the PKN vessels, they are unable to fight back without damaging their own craft. Arriving late in the battle, Captain Hayami deliberately steers the 707 into the way of a torpedo launched at the supercarrier that serves as the PKN's flagship. His ship is destroyed, but the flagship, Captain Hayami and the 707 's crew survive.

Six months later, Captain Hayami is given command of a completely new 707, and takes on a crew of old comrades and brand new cadets to battle Admiral Red once more. As the inevitable showdown draws ever closer, it becomes a personal battle between Admiral Red with his superior technology and USR's submarine fleet and Captain Hayami with his submariner skills and loyal crew.

== Characters ==
Captain Yōhei Hayami
Voiced by Kōsei Tomita (707); Ben Hiura (707R, Japanese); Michael Sorich (707R, English): Maritime Self-Defense Force officer. Captain of the 707, and acknowledged to be one of the finest submariners. Married to Miyuki with a daughter, Ayumi, or Ayu for short.
Hayato Nango
Voiced by Tōru Furusawa (707); Hiroshi Yanaka (707R, Japanese); Roy Williams (707R, English): Maritime Self-Defense Officer and Captain Hayami's Executive Officer (XO), who through the manga series went from third to second grade officer and later became the captain of the 717.
Admiral Red Terakaizo Omar
Voiced by: Unshō Ishizuka (Japanese); Jamieson Price (English): Leader of the USR and commander of the submarine UX. Married with three pre-teen daughters and an infant son, Makoto.

== Release ==
The first original attempt for an anime series based on the manga was planned back in 1964 but around the same time released as an audio drama on sonosheet (ソノシート, sonoshīto; a very thin-sized record).

In 1997, an OVA was released that titled Deep-sea Fleet Submarine 707 (深海の艦隊 サブマリン707, Sinkai no Kantai Sabumarin Nana Maru Nana) by Toei Doga. The "Submarine 707R" OVAs were released by Aniplex back in Sept. 26, 2003 (mission 01) and April 24, 2004 (mission 02).
