= Satoru Ozawa =

Japanese manga artist

Satoru Ozawa (Japanese: 小沢 さとる, Hepburn: Ozawa Satoru; born 1937) is a Japanese manga artist from Saitama Prefecture, Japan. He made his professional debut as a manga artist in 1957 with Rumi Shinanai de and is known for creating ocean-themed science fiction manga.

== Career ==
Ozawa debuted as a manga artist in 1957. He became known for works centered on marine and submarine science fiction. His works include Submarine 707 and Blue Submarine No. 6, both of which were adapted into original video animations.

In addition to manga, Ozawa was involved in the development of commercial products such as RoboDutch and Choro Q.

From around 1970, Ozawa's output decreased significantly. In October 1983, he suffered a severe cervical spine injury in a traffic accident, resulting in a prolonged period of recovery. He returned to creative activity only after several years of medical treatment and rehabilitation.

In July 2013, an event titled "Operation 707" was held at Wonder Festival 2013 (Summer) to commemorate the 50th anniversary of the start of serialization of Submarine 707. The event included a talk show featuring Ozawa, an exhibition of his original artwork, and related displays connected to the series.

== Artistic origins and themes ==
Ozawa has stated that he decided to pursue a career as a manga artist while in his third year of high school, after being introduced to work as an inking assistant for Osamu Tezuka. During this period, he was exposed to professional manga production and interacted with Tezuka directly, an experience that strongly influenced his decision to become a manga artist.

His interest in ships and submarines originated in childhood, when he frequently accompanied his father on business trips and visited ports around Japan. He read maritime publications extensively and was particularly drawn to submarines, which he viewed as representing a vast inner universe beneath the sea.

Ozawa's works frequently depict underwater combat and conflicts in which seemingly powerful antagonists are defeated abruptly. He has explained that this narrative pattern was influenced by editorial demands to continually introduce stronger enemies, which affected both story development and mechanical design within his works.

He preferred realism grounded in engineering logic while simultaneously constructing speculative worlds governed by imagined physical laws. Ozawa emphasized conceptual consistency in science fiction, expressing reluctance toward simplistic narrative devices and favoring depictions that included realistic limitations and consequences for technology and human-made systems.

== Works ==
The following is a list of manga and related works credited to Ozawa:

- Blue Submarine No. 6
- Submarine 707
- Shōnen Taifūn
- Kaitei Sentai
- MM Sanda
- Yellow Zero Fighter
- Saipīt
- Hantom X
- Skip Red
