= Kyōfu no Yakata DX =

Japanese manga magazine

- Categories: Horror, shōjo manga
- Frequency: Monthly
- First issue: December 1992
- Final issue: July 1998
- Company: LEED
- Country: Japan
- Language: Japanese

Horror Woopee
- Categories: Horror, shōjo manga
- Frequency: Monthly (August 1998-November 1998), Quarterly (December 1998-Winter 2000)
- First issue: August 1998
- Final issue: Winter 2000
- Company: LEED
- Country: Japan
- Language: Japanese

Kyōfu no Yakata DX (恐怖の館デラックス) was a monthly shōjo horror manga magazine published by LEED, the respective imprint for manga serialized in it were SP Comics: Kyōfu no Yakata comic series, Kyō Dera (恐デラ) and Leed Horror Bunko. In the table of contents, alongside the cover art credits, there would be a small horror story related to the cover created by the illustrator.

One of its artists, Noroi Michiru, has noted that the magazine's content was particularly violent and inappropriate for a shōjo magazine.

== History ==
Its first volume came out in December 1992, it became popular due to featuring ''horror interviews'' consisting of scary stories and real supernatural experiences from famous celebrities, singers and TV personalities.

In 1994, Tooru Yamazaki debuted with the short story Uroko Jigoku he quickly became popular in the magazine, eventually being in charge of the cover art. This popularity as a mangaka later helped him launch his career as a media personality.

One of the most popular features of the magazine were manga adaptations of the supposedly real ghost stories of professional storyteller Junji Inagawa. Many of these short stories would get reprinted in anthology books in the SP Comics and after August 1998, in the Horror Woopee Comics label.

The magazine was discontinued after the June and July combined issue, its successor was Horror Woopee (ホラーウーピー) which started monthly with August 1998 issue, that was switched to a quarterly schedule in the Winter issue of 1999 published in December 1998; Horror Woopee ceased publication in the winter of 2000 issue.

A few of Hideshi Hino's works published by Cocoro Books were originally released in this magazine. In 2006, Dark Horse released Octopus Girl in the North American market. Masako Tsukimori's Clan Under the Moon, Miyako Cojima's Wonder House of Horrors and Virginia Inferno are licensed by Star Fruit Books.

== Notable manga artists featured ==
- Kanako Inuki
  - The Haunted Examination Room
  - School Zone
  - Hadaka no Jo'ō-sama
- Hideshi Hino
  - Zipangu Night
  - Kyoufu Gallery
- Ochazukenori
  - Mayoko-chan
- Tooru Yamazaki
  - Octopus Girl
  - Shikabane Shōjo
- Misao Inagaki
  - Ryouki Densetsu: Alucard
- Miyako Cojima
  - Wonder House of Horrors
- Noroi Michiru
  - The Girl in the Clock Mansion
- Futaba Ōno
  - Dokuro no Harawata
  - Writhing in the Darkness: MJ
- Mori Kanda
  - Kaiki Miira Shoujo
  - Hakaba Kyōshitsu
- Itou Lynch
  - Magical Hebiko-chan
- Akira Fūga
  - Shin Maou Dante
- Tomoo Taniguchi
  - Psycho Kōjō
- Ayumi Hattori
  - NIGHT SEEKERS
- Masako Tsukimori
  - Clan Under the Moon
- Kuniko Saitou
- Misaki Hayase
- Tamayumi Saba
