= Rei Mikamoto =

Japanese manga artist

Rei Mikamoto 三家本礼
- Born: October 31, 1974 (age 52) Hiroshima, Japan
- Area: Manga artist
- Notable works: Reiko the Zombie Shop

Rei Mikamoto (三家本 礼, Mikamoto Rei) is a Japanese horror manga artist who wrote and illustrated Reiko the Zombie Shop (ゾンビ屋れい子, Zombie-ya Reiko; "Zombie-merchant Reiko"), Satanister (サタニスター, Satanisutā), Chimamire Sukeban Chainsaw (血まみれスケバンチェーンソー, Chimamire Sukeban Chainsaw) and Big Tits Dragon (巨乳ドラゴン, Kyonyū Doragon). The last was adapted in 2010 as a feature movie as Big Tits Zombie.

== Style ==
Many of Rei's works involve themes of powerful (and sometimes psychotic) female casts that serve as both protagonists and antagonists. He also appears to take influences from female wrestlers and warriors along with using dark humor and ero guro themed humor.

== Works ==
He frequently made artwork for the covers of Horror M.

- Reiko the Zombie Shop
- Big Tits Dragon
- Satanister
- Chimamire Sukeban Chainsaw: Adapted into live-action film in 2016
- Bijo Amanda
- Majonna
- Iron Ghost no Shōjo (アイアン・ゴーストの少女, Aian Gōsuto no Shōjo), 2017
- Chimamire Sukeban Chainsaw: Reflesh
