= Kanako Inuki =

Japanese manga writer and illustrator

- Born: 1958 (age 67–68); Hokkaidō

Kanako Inuki (犬木 加奈子, Inuki Kanako; born 28 November 1958) is a Japanese manga writer and illustrator.

Inuki was born in Hokkaidō and moved to Tokyo as a young girl. Starting out with an interest in manga she began to draw and write for horror manga. Her first published work was the short story Orusuban in 1987, which was published in a special edition of the shōjo manga magazine Shōjo Friend which was compiled by Kazuo Umezu. She was then a part of the 1990s boom in the horror genre in the Japanese manga market, becoming one of the leading authors and publishing in magazines like Horror House, Horror M, Suspiria and Suspense & Horror. Her work is characterized by a rich style of terror, influenced by folklore, tradition and the moralising ironic humor. She has been called the "Queen of the Horror Manga".

== Works ==
- Orusuban (おるすばん), 1987, published in Shōjo Friend
- Hell Mother (ヘル・マザー), 1990
- Kanaerareta Negai (かなえられた願い), 1991
- Fushigi no Tatari-chan (不思議のたたりちゃん), 1991–1998, published in Shōjo Friend and Suspense & Horror
- Presents (プレゼント, Puresento), 1993–1998, published in Suspiria
- Kuchisake Onna Densetsu (口裂け女伝説), 1995
- Bukita-kun (不気田くん), 1995, volume 1 published in Horror House and volumes 2-3 published in Horror M
- School Zone (スクールゾーン), 1996–1997, published in Kyōfu no Yakata DX
- Kaidan (怪談), 1996
- Warau Nikumen (笑う肉面), 1996
- Be Very Afraid of Kanako Inuki! (犬木加奈子の大恐怖!, Inuki Kanako no Daikyōfu!), 1997
- Horror Anthology Comic Shikaku
- 13-nin no Short Suspense & Horror
- Doko ni demo Aru Chotto Kowai Hanashi
- Kaiki Ningyoukan
