= Ochazukenori =

Japanese manga artist

- Born: April 12, 1960; Kawasaki, Japan
- Occupation: Manga artist

Ochazukenori (御茶漬海苔; born April 12, 1960) is a Japanese manga artist. He is most famous for the horror manga he drew in the 1980s and 1990s.

== Life ==
Ochazukenori was born in Kawasaki in 1960. He began reading manga from rental bookstores as a child, later he read Weekly Shōnen Sunday and Weekly Shōnen Magazine and drew manga inspired by Satoru Ozawa's Submarine 707. In his youth and while attending Rissho University in Tokyo, he drew doujinshi together with friends. When he wanted to start his career as a professional manga artist, he had to send money to his parents to convince them of his career decision, as they wanted him to take over their hardware store. His doujinshi anthology Pen Touch gained a following for its obscure content. In parallel, he worked as an assistant first for manga artist Nasubi Fujitaka and then Takeshi Ebihara. He started his career as a professional artist in 1984 in the lolicon magazine Lemon People with the short story "Seireijima". His pseudonym Ochazukenori is the name of a rice dish with green tea and dried algae. He chose it, because it is similar to his birth name and because another manga artist suggested it to him and he like it.

His first published works outside of lolicon magazines were with the publisher Asahi Sonorama, starting with the short story "Tōkyō ni Yukinofurubi" in 1986. While these manga were science fiction, he received more positive response from readers for his horror manga that he drew for the magazine Monthly Halloween, beginning with the short story "Blind". With the series Zangekikan ("The Horror Mansion"), which he serialized from 1987 until 1993, he shifted fully towards horror manga. He specialized in short stories or episodic series and was a regular contributor to the big horror manga magazines of the 1980s and 1990s like Monthly Halloween, Horror M and Suspiria. At the peak of his career, he drew over 100 pages a month for various monthly magazines.

When the serial murderer Tsutomu Miyazaki sparked a public discourse around horror manga in the early 1990s, Ochazukenori received phone calls at home about how his manga would promote criminal activity.

He also became active as a film director, adapting three of the stories from his Zangekikan series into live-action films in 2008. One of the three episodes, Bathroom, won a film prize at an arthouse film festival.

He published only little new work in the 2000s, but became more active again in the 2010s. He focused on drawing web manga.

== Style ==
He is known for an aesthetic of splatter and gore. The center of his stories is often mental illness, with depictions of bloody corpses, fratricide and torture. His character design is angular. Ochazukenori keeps drawing by hand; he says "If you draw with a pen tablet, the manuscript will not remain. So if there is a power outage, you won't be able to read it".

== Legacy ==
Manga artist Yoshiki Takaya calls Ochazukenori an early influence, as Takaya was contributing to his doujinshi anthology Pen Touch. He recalled: "The kind of stories that Nori was drawing weren't what you'd call 'popular.' Our fanzine was the only place where he could create his own ideal manga."

Singer Kyōko Koizumi is a fan of his manga, letting him write the lyrics for her song Kōri no Toshi (凍りの都市) from the album Hippies and make a manga based on it. She also wrote the recommendation on the obi of Kyōfu Terebi TVO: Ochazukenori Jisenshu (恐怖テレビ（TVO）御茶漬海苔自選集), saying ''Ochazukenori's horror is like a fairy tale. Pure, beautiful and so, so scary.''

Ochazukenori has gained some international recognition for his manga. His work has been translated into French. The Japan Foundation in Sydney exhibited his work as part of the exhibition Retro Horror: Supernatural and the Occult in Postwar Japanese Manga from 2019 until 2021.

== Works ==
Title	Year	Notes	Refs
"Seireijima" (精霊島)	1984	Short story published in Lemon People	
Suna no Television (砂のテレビジョン)	1985	Published by Kubo Shoten in 1 vol.	
Reincarnation (リーンカーネーション)	1986	Published by Tokyo Sanseisha in 1 vol.	
Comet (コメット)	1986	Short story published in Asahi Sonorama's Bogeyman	
Dōki (童鬼)	1987	Serialized in LC Mystery Published by Tokyo Sanseisha in 1 vol.	
Maō Ghoul – Nevillestone Densetsu (魔王グール -ネビルストーン伝説-)	1987	Serialized in Battle Machine; Published by Asahi Sonorama in 1 vol.	
Zangekikan (惨劇館)	1987–1993	Serialized in Monthly Halloween; Published by Asahi Sonorama in 10 vol.	
Nebirosu no Sōji (ネビロスの双児)	1988	Serialized in Horror & Occult Kyousaku Daizenshuu Published by Tokyo Sanseisha in 2 vol.	
13-nichi no Ochazukenori (13日の御茶漬海苔)	1988	Serialized in Monthly Halloween Published by Asahi Sonorama in 1 vol.	
Kurukuru (クルクル)	1988–1989	Serialized in Monthly Halloween; Published by Asahi Sonorama in 1 vol.	
TVO	1989–1990	Serialized in Young Sunday; Published by Shogakukan in 3 vol.	
Hime (姫)	1991–1992	Published by Shongen Gahosha in 3 vol.	
Chalk (チョーク)	1991–1992	Published by Leeds Publishing in 5 vol.	
Yōkai Monogatari (妖怪物語)	1991–1992	Serialized in Monthly Halloween Published by Asahi Sonorama in 3 vol.	
Kyōfu Jikkenshitsu (恐怖実験室)	1994–1996	Serialized in Suspiria; Published by Akita Shoten in 5 vol.	
Kyōfu Terebi TVO (恐怖テレビTVO)	1994	Serialized in Young Sunday and Horror M Published by Bunkasha in 4 vol.	
Ankoku Jiten (暗黒辞典)	1995–1997	Serialized in Horror M Published by Bunkasha in 4 vol.	
Mayoko-chan (魔夜子ちゃん)	1995–1997	Serialized in Kyōfu no Yakata DX; Published by Leeds Publishing in 3 vol.	
Kyōfu no Shinri Game (恐怖の心理ゲーム)	1999	Co-authored with psychologist Takashi Tomita; Published by Kawade Shobo Shinsha in 1 vol.	
Shōwa Kanamono-ya Monogatari (昭和金物屋物語)	2007	Published by Kasakura Shuppansha in 1 vol.	
Itain desu (痛いんです)	2012	Serialized in Comic Essay Theater; Published by Media Factory in 1 vol.	
Zansatsu Circus (斬殺サーカス)	2013–2016	Serialized in Manga Samurai Style; Published by Gakken in 2 vol.	
Jigoku Hakase to Neko: Dr.Inferno Meets the Cat (地獄博士とネコ)	2014–2015	Serialized in Comic Spica; Published by Kadokawa Shoten in 1 vol.	
Onnya no Isshō (おんニャの一生)	2021–Present	Serialized in Aokishi	
