= Senno Knife =

Japanese manga artist (born 1960)

Senno Knife (千之 ナイフ, Senno Naifu; born September 5, 1960) is a Japanese manga artist, born in Tokyo.

His debut pen name was Kazuto Yamamoto (Yamamoto Kazuto (山本 和都). His name in rōmaji is misspelled as "Senno Naiff" in the books published by Akita Shoten and Bunkasha.

== Biography ==
A former assistant to Leiji Matsumoto and Miyako Maki, he became an assistant at the same time as Kaoru Shintani, who also was assistant to Matsumoto. Before his commercial debut, he was active as a doujinshi artist, and as of 2023, he still active in the scene.

He made his debut in a commercial magazine in 1981 with "Yukihime" in the first issue of "Lemon People" (published by Amatoria). From the time of his debut to the early years of his career, he worked mainly in adult-oriented manga magazines, and since 1984, he has also written for general magazines, shōnen and shōjo (boys' and girls') magazines. His works cover a wide range of genres, including horror, science fiction, fantasy, and manga comicalizations (adaptations of famous fairy tales and novels).

His wife is the mangaka and illustrator Rutoto Nekoi(a.k.a Nekoi PSYDOLL). Most of the jacket illustrations for Psydoll, a post-new wave band in which Nekoi is a vocalist, are drawn by him.

== Style ==
Senno Knife's main style since his debut has been a detailed and aesthetic style of drawing and a unique and enigmatic storyline. His works are often fantastical, especially with themes of sex, death, demons, dolls, TSF (transgender fiction), and yuri, but some of his works also include gag and parody elements, giving his style a wide range.

== Selected works ==
- Yoruhime (The Princess of Night)
- Present
- Akai Knife no Yoru (Rotenacht)
- 1989 - Valkyr
- 1993 - Bizzarian
- Cinderella Doll
- Kurakunatte Majo (Melancholy Little Miss Witch)vol.1, vol2
- Bishojo Sekai (Cuties' World)
- Meikyu Hihou-Kan (The Secret Museum of Labyrinth)
- Yoruha Fantasia
- Yoruhime (The Princess of Night) (Reissue)
- 1993 - Sepia
- 1994 - Eden
- 1995 - Shōjo Pandora
- 1996 - Sister
- 1997 - Shitaro-kun
- 1999 - Eden no Saigoni (The End of Eden)
- 1999 - Ningen Modoki
- 2002 - Labyrinth Circus
- 2000 - Kamakiri Onna (Mantis Woman)
- Classical masterpieces collection (古典名作集 Koten meisaku shu):
- Sade (2003)
- Tempest (2005)
- Decameron (2006)
- Uwasa no Shitaro-kun(2006)
- Uwasa no Shitaro-kun Returns(2007)
- Faust (2007)
- Sade 2 femme fatale (2008)
- Mayonakano Lady (Lady in Midnight)
- Yoshiwara Yujo Eden (Yoshiwara Oiran Picture stories)(2011)
- Namanarisan (participate as a manga artist and scriptwriter for comic version)
- Meikon Gestalt (participate as a manga artist and scriptwriter for comic version)
- Ningyohime (The Doll Princess)
- Momomaro Kitan (The Weird Adventure of Momomaro)

Several of Senno Knife's works (Valkyr, Bizzarian, Dark Dimension Zero, Sepia, and Eden) were published in English by Studio Ironcat. Several of Senno Knife's Horror works (Shitaro-kun) were published in French. Several of Senno's works were published in Cantonese by some publishing companies in Taiwan.

=== Video game illustrations ===
- 1988 - Senno Knife's Demon Girl Mansion (Senno Knife no Mahou Shoujokan; 千之ナイフの魔少女館) (PC-8801/MSX2) (I-cell)
- 1989 - Senno Knife: Demon Girls in the Labyrinth (Senno Knife no Meikyuu no Mashoujo; 千之ナイフ 迷宮の魔少女) (PC-8801 / PC-9801 / MSX2) (I-cell)
- 1998 - End Sector (PlayStation; some card illustrations)
