= Beyond Twilight (manga) =

Japanese manga series and its adaptations

- First tankōbon volume cover

百鬼夜行抄 (Hyakkiyakō Shō)
- Genre: Horror, mystery
- Manga
- Written by: Ichiko Ima
- Published by: Asahi Shimbun Publishing
- English publisher: NA: Aurora Publishing
- Magazine: Nemuki (1995–December 13, 2012); Nemuki+ (April 13, 2013–present)
- Original run: 1995 – present
- Volumes: 32
- Television drama
- Written by: Jiro Kaneko; Takuro Fukuda
- Studio: Nippon TV
- Original network: Nippon TV, SDT
- Original run: February 3, 2007 – March 31, 2007
- Episodes: 9
- Anime television series

Hyakki Yakoushou
- Directed by: Saya Fukase
- Music by: kidlit
- Studio: Imagica Infos; Imageworks Studio
- Licensed by: Remow: SEA: Medialink
- Original network: tvk
- Original run: April 7, 2026 – June 23, 2026
- Episodes: 12
- icon

Beyond Twilight (Japanese: 百鬼夜行抄, Hepburn: Hyakkiyakō Shō) is a Japanese manga series written and illustrated by Ichiko Ima. It began serialization in Asahi Shimbun Publishing's shōjo manga magazine Nemuki in 1995. After the magazine's disbandment in December 2012, it was transferred to the Nemuki+ magazine in April 2013. A 9-episode television drama adaptation aired on Nippon TV and SDT from February to March 2007. It was also adapted into five drama CDs and two stage plays. A short-form "light anime" television series adaptation produced by Imagica Infos and Imageworks Studio aired from April to June 2026.

== Plot ==
Ritsu is a young man who has inherited the ability to see spirits and demons from his late grandfather, a renowned novelist and spiritualist. This "sixth sense" makes Ritsu visible to entities from the spirit world, leaving him vulnerable to good and evil forces. After his grandfather's death, Ritsu loses the protection he once had under his care and forms a contract with a demon guardian known as Blue Storm, whose motives are not always aligned with Ritsu's well-being. The series is structured as a collection of largely self-contained stories, centered on supernatural incidents that arise around Ritsu and Blue Storm.

== Characters ==
Ritsu Ijima (飯嶋律, Ijima Ritsu)
Voiced by: Nobuhiko Okamoto, Haruka Okamura (childhood)
Tsukasa Ijima (飯嶋司, Ijima Tsukasa)
Voiced by: Ikumi Hasegawa
Seiran (青嵐)
Voiced by: Hironori Kondō
Kagyuu Ijima (飯嶋蝸牛, Ijima Kagyū)
Voiced by: Kazuki Kyan
Kinu Ijima (飯嶋絹, Ijima Kinu)
Voiced by: Marie Miyake
Yaeko Iijima (飯嶋八重子, Ijima Yaeko)
Voiced by: Miki Natsutani
Sumiko Hidaka (日高澄子, Hidaka Sumiko)
Voiced by: Haruka Okamura
Kana (佳奈)
Voiced by: Eri Akiyama
Ojiro (尾白)
Voiced by: Nao Shiraki
Okuro (尾黒)
Voiced by: Kohei Yanagi

== Media ==
=== Manga ===
Written and illustrated by Ichiko Ima, Beyond Twilight began serialization in Asahi Shimbun Publishing's shōjo manga magazine Nemuki in 1995. After the final issue of the Nemuki magazine was published on December 13, 2012, the series was transferred to the Nemuki+ magazine on April 13, 2013. Its chapters have been collected into 32 tankōbon volumes as of April 2026. The series was licensed in English by Aurora Publishing, which released the first volume in June 2010 before the publisher folded the same year.

=== Drama CDs ===
A series of five drama CDs was released by Frontier Works from July 2002 to July 2006.

=== Stage play ===
Two stage play adaptations ran at Hanagumi Shibai between January 2003 and September 2006.

=== Drama ===
A 9-episode television drama adaptation aired on Nippon TV and SDT from February 3 to March 31, 2007.

=== Anime ===
A short-form "light anime" television series adaptation was announced by the Nemuki+ X (formerly Twitter) account on February 13, 2026. The series is produced by Imagica Infos and Imageworks Studio and directed by Saya Fukase, with Taeko Miura serving as the sound director and kidlit composing the music. It aired from April 7 to June 23, 2026, on tvk. The ending theme song is "Nani ni mo Narenai" (何にもなれない) performed by Yangskinny. Remow licensed the series for streaming on the "It's Anime" free ad-supported streaming television (FAST) channel on Samsung TV Plus. Medialink licensed the series for streaming on Ani-One Asia's YouTube channel.

== Reception ==
Beyond Twilight was recommended at the 9th Japan Media Arts Festival in 2005, and won the Excellence Award in the Manga Division at the 10th Japan Media Arts Festival in 2006. The manga series was a finalist for the Grand Prize at the 9th Tezuka Osamu Cultural Prize in 2005.

By March 2026, the series had over 700,000 copies in circulation.
