= Morgan Berry =

American voice actress

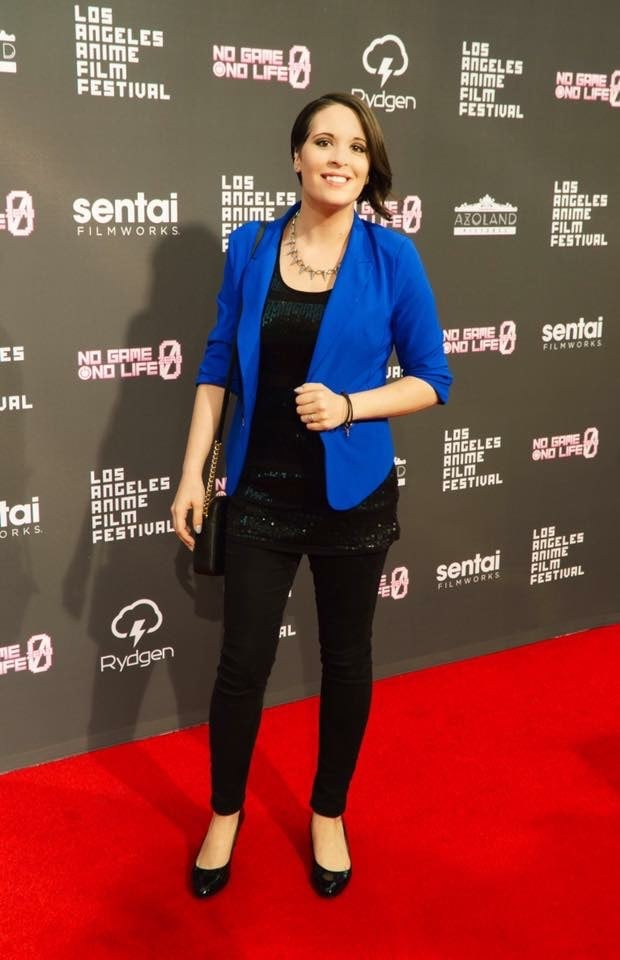
- Morgan Berry at the LA Anime Film Festival 2017
- Occupation: Voice actress
- Years active: 2015–present
- Website: themorganberry.com

Morgan Berry is an American voice actress. She is best known for her voice roles in various anime shows, films, video games, and web series. Berry is also a recording artist and YouTube personality under the name "The Unknown Songbird".

== Personal life ==
Berry is non-binary. Berry uses they/she pronouns.

== Filmography ==
=== Anime ===
Year	Title	Role
2015	Yurikuma Arashi	D5
2015	Hyperdimension Neptunia	Linda/Underling
2015	Noragami	Keiichi
2015	Riddle Story of Devil	Tokaku Azuma
2015	Tokyo Ghoul	Young Nishiki
2015	Tokyo Ghoul √A	Ayumu Hogi
2016	91 Days	Young Angelo Lagus
2016	Barakamon	Akihiko "Akki" Arai
2016	Handa-kun	Saito
2016	Danganronpa 3: The End of Hope's Peak High School – Despair Arc	Suzuko Kashiwagi
2016	Chaos Dragon	Young Sweallow
2016	Joker Game	Akira Arisaki (Child)
2016	Keijo!!!!!!!!	Yūko Ōshima
2016	Kiss Him, Not Me	Alexandrite
2016	Lord Marksman and Vanadis	Young Tigrevurmud "Tigre" Vorn
2016	Yona of the Dawn	Young Gija
2016	Shonen Maid	Yuji Hino
2016	Snow White with the Red Hair	Kido Deena
2016	Maria the Virgin Witch	Suzanne
2016	Tokyo ESP	Ayumu Oozora
2016–2017	Nanbaka	Mao Nimaijita
2016–2017	The Heroic Legend of Arslan	Young Hilmes
2016–2023	My Hero Academia	Thirteen
2017	Black Clover	Nash
2017	Three Leaves, Three Colors	Hajime Tsuji
2017	Samurai Warriors	Young Nobuyuki Sanada
2017	Servamp	Puck, Sagami
2017	Blood Blockade Battlefront & Beyond	Emilina Anderson
2017	Blood Blockade Battlefront & Beyond	Emilina Anderson
2017	Convenience Store Boy Friends	Nozomi Itokawa
2017	Divine Gate	Hiroto
2017	Gangsta.	Young Yang
2017	ēlDLIVE	Chuta Kokonose
2017	Hyouka	Inoue
2017	Kantai Collection	Kitakami
2017	Love Live! Sunshine!!	Yoshiko Tsushima
2017	Overlord	Nfirea Bareare
2017	Trickster	Sousuke
2017–2018	One Piece	Shyarly
2017–2019	Food Wars	Rindo Kobayashi
2018	A.I.C.O. -Incarnation-	Koharu Kagami
2018	Basilisk: The Ouka Ninja Scrolls	Hachirou Kouga (Young)
2018	Dance with Devils	Young Lindo Tachibana
2018	Darling in the Franxx	Goro (Child)
2018	Death March to the Parallel World Rhapsody	Lilio
2018	Full Metal Panic! Invisible Victory	Sabina Rechnio
2018	Free! – Dive to the Future	Misaki Kuramoto
2018	Magical Girl Raising Project	Weiss Winterprison/Shizuku Ashuu
2018	Touken Ranbu: Hanamaru	Sayo Samonji
2018	Kakuriyo: Bed and Breakfast for Spirits	Kai
2018	Magical Girl Spec-Ops Asuka	Nozomi Makino
2018	Tokyo Ghoul:re	Ayumu Hogi
2018	Sword Art Online Alternative: Gun Gale Online	Tanya/Risa Kusonoki
2018–2019	JoJo's Bizarre Adventure: Diamond is Unbreakable	Young Keicho Nijimura, Koichi's Mother
2018–2019	Megalo Box	Santa
2019	My Roommate is a Cat	Hiroto Yasaka (Child)
2019	The Promised Neverland	Leslie
2019	Cells at Work!	NK Cell
2019	Cutie Honey Universe	Dragon Panther
2019	Dragon Ball Super	Kakunsa/Sanka Coo
2019	A Certain Magical Index III	Floris
2019	Kase-san and Morning Glories	Kase-san
2019–2020	My Teen Romantic Comedy SNAFU	Taishi Kawasaki
2019–2020	7 Seeds	Botan Saotome
2019–present	The Rising of the Shield Hero	Glass
2020	Asteroid in Love	Ao Manaka
2020	If My Favorite Pop Idol Made It to the Budokan, I Would Die	Sorane Matsuyama
2020	Pokémon: Twilight Wings	Tommy
2020–2021	Sword Art Online: Alicization – War of Underworld	Renly
2020–2022	Yashahime: Princess Half-Demon	Moroha
2021–2022	Beyblade Burst QuadDrive	Bel Daizora
2022	Kakegurui Twin	Yukimi Togakushi
2022	Lycoris Recoil	Fuki Harukawa
2022	Tokyo 24th Ward	Hana Shishido
2023	Dead Mount Death Play	Polka
2023	The Iceblade Sorcerer Shall Rule the World	Helena "Gray" Grady
2023	Frieren: Beyond Journey's End	Übel
2023	Beyblade Burst QuadStrike	Bel Daizora
2024	Kimi ni Todoke	Chizuru Yoshida
2024	I Was Reincarnated as the 7th Prince so I Can Take My Time Perfecting My Magical Ability	Sylpha
2024	Natsume's Book of Friends	Mountain Goddess
2025	The Shiunji Family Children	Minami
2025	Sanda	Shiori Fuyumura
2025	Clevatess	Clen/Klen
2025	Tojima Wants to Be a Kamen Rider	Tojima's Mom
2025	Gnosia	Setsu
2026	Playing Death Games to Put Food on the Table	Beniya
2026	Roll Over and Die	Y'lla
2026	Go for It, Nakamura!	Kana

=== Animation ===
Year	Title	Role
2019	Miraculous: Tales of Ladybug & Cat Noir	Vivica/Desperada

=== Films ===
Year	Title	Role
2015	The Boy and the Beast	Young Ichirohiko
2019	Love Live! Sunshine!! The School Idol Movie: Over the Rainbow	Yoshiko Tsushima

=== Video games ===
Year	Title	Role
2014	Smite	SWC Amaterasu, Midnight Dove Awilix
2016	Marvel Avengers Academy	Silver Sable
2017	Fire Emblem Heroes	Melady
2018	Dragon Ball Legends	Kakunsa
2019	Borderlands 3	Janice Cardalia, News Anchor Shanneth Kyrie, Nyriad
2019	Sword of the Necromancer	Tama
2020	Deadly Premonition 2: A Blessing in Disguise	Raven Yahoo
2020	TOME: Terrain of Magical Expertise RPG	White Hat Hacker
2020	Freedom Planet 2	Merga
2022	Azure Striker Gunvolt 3	Serpentine
2025	Path to Nowhere	Augustus
2026	Final Fantasy Resonance	Veritas of the Light

=== Web series ===
Title	Role
FFVII: Machinabridged	Elena
Death Battle	Trish, The Yellow Ranger
God's School	Eris
SLVR	Ragora Cinarum
MyStreet	Melissa Lycan, Jenna, Principal Layla
Diaries Rebirth	Lillian
Dreams of Estorra	Valkaria
Rainbow High	Lyric Lucas

== Discography ==
As Morgan Berry:

- Fearless
- Voltron Heroes

As The Unknown Songbird:

- Unravel (Tokyo Ghoul)
- Diver (Naruto Shippuden)
- Heroes (My Hero Academia)
- Crossing Field
- Resonance (Soul Eater)
- Butter-Fly
- The Day
