= Zangekikan =

Japanese horror manga series

- Horror Mansion

惨劇館 (Zangekikan)
- Genre: horror, thriller
- Created by: Ochazukenori
- Manga
- Written by: Ochazukenori
- Published by: Asahi Sonorama
- Magazine: Monthly Halloween
- Original run: 1986 – 1994
- Volumes: 10

Zangekikan (Japanese: 惨劇館, lit. 'Mansion of Tragedy') or Horror Mansion is a Japanese horror omnibus shōjo manga series by Ochazukenori. It spans 45 chapters and 12 bonus stories collected into 10 volumes, 9 of them mostly serialized in Monthly Halloween and its final one being all original content. It has been adapted into 3 movies. The 2011 movie adaptation of the short story Blinds has been released in English-speaking countries as Horror Mansion: The Blinds.

== Publication ==
Ochazukenori's first horror manga for Monthly Halloween was Blinds (ブラインド) in the April issue of the magazine, later he published Bathroom (バスルーム) in the June issue, their style of splatter horror was well received by readers. He was asked to make a serial work, so he drew the first chapter of his series Zangekikan, titled Telephone (テレフォン), published in the July 1986 issue of Monthly Halloween. The series continued and became extremely popular, marking Ochazukenori's rise in the horror manga industry and its reputation as masterpiece of its genre.

The series reached its peak in the late 80s, but the Tsutomu Miyazaki case sparked controversy against violent horror manga, causing a decline in horror magazine's popularity and restrictions on content made him change the style of the series from hyper-violent human-based horrors with themes of mental illness and sadism to more tame supernatural works. He also started the series Ochazukenori no Yōkai Monogatari centered on monsters.

The restrictions of "Don't kill people, don't draw blood, don't draw corpses." made him leave the magazine after volume 9 on Zangekikan. Volume 10, published 3 years after he quit the magazine, contained all brand new stories that hadn't been passed by any magazine. It was published since some people at Asahi Sonorama wanted Ochazukenori to finish the series but it was too violent to be serialized in their publications.

These 10 original volumes were published by Asahi Sonorama and their e-book versions are published by Group Zero under the Horror Ecstasy imprint.

== Continuity ==
Although most of its stories are completely unrelated, within the series there are 2 series of connected stories, Count Kevin (ケビンの惨劇, Kevin no Zangeki) and Yumeko. (夢子)

The stories in Count Kevin have the shared element of the presence of a powerful western demon called Kevin and the torment he causes on his victims after being freed from his castle. Yumeko follows Okuya Yumeko, a detective that has precognitive dreams involving murder cases. The stories in the first 3 chapters of Yumeko are reminsecent of Italian giallo thriller movies.

== Sequels ==
Ochazukenori has published 2 e-book series under the Zangekikan name, Kyōfu no Zangekikan (恐怖の惨劇館, lit. The Terrifying Mansion of Tragedy) and Zangekikan 2 (惨劇館2, lit. Mansion of Tragedy 2.)

== List of adaptations ==
- Zangekikan: Yumeko (惨劇館 夢子, 2002)
- Ochazukenori no Zangekikan (御茶漬海苔の惨劇館, 2010)
- Horror Mansion: The Blinds (惨劇館ブラインド, 2011) part of the "Kojuncha" project with Junji Ito and Shin'ichi Koga.

== Collaborations and parodies ==
Hideshi Hino has done a parody of Ocha's works called Mushi Danshaku no Zangeki (蟲男爵の惨劇, lit. Bug Baron's Tragedy), it specifically references Zangekikan and the Mushi Danshaku series in the omnibus Ankoku Jiten. It is under the joke pen name 酒茶漬海苔, which takes Ochazukenori's pen name and replaces the first kanji with booze (酒, Sake) but is pronounced the same as Hino Hideshi.

Ochazukenori has collaborated with Mitsuru Miura, involving 2 short manga and a talk about manga in Osaka.
