= Ikumi Hasegawa =

Japanese voice actress

- 長谷川 育美
- Born: May 31; Tochigi Prefecture, Japan
- Occupation: Voice actress
- Years active: 2016–present
- Agent: Raccoon Dog
- Notable work: 86 as Vladilena Milizé; Tsukihime -A piece of blue glass moon- as Arcueid Brunestud; If My Favorite Pop Idol Made It to the Budokan, I Would Die as Sorane Matsuyama; Bottom-tier Character Tomozaki as Minami Nanami; Umamusume: Pretty Derby as Mihono Bourbon; How a Realist Hero Rebuilt the Kingdom as Aisha Udgard; Love After World Domination as Desumi Magahara; Blue Archive as Asuna Ichinose; Bocchi the Rock! as Ikuyo Kita; Frieren: Beyond Journey's End as Übel; 7th Time Loop as Rishe Irmgard Weitzner
- Height: 164 cm (5 ft 5 in)

Ikumi Hasegawa (長谷川 育美, Hasegawa Ikumi; born May 31) is a Japanese voice actress.

== Filmography ==
=== Anime series ===
Year	Title	Role(s)	Notes
2016	Aikatsu Stars!	Motoko	
2018	Seven Senses of the Reunion	Momoi	
2018	Chio's School Road	Fuyumi Nojo	Episode 12
2018	Happy Sugar Life	Mitori Tajima	
2018	Iroduku: The World in Colors	Sanami Asagawa	
2018	Dakaichi	Maki Shimura	
2019	Domestic Girlfriend	Kanae	
2019	My Roommate Is a Cat	Hiroto Yasaka (child)	
2019	Cautious Hero: The Hero Is Overpowered but Overly Cautious	Giorne	Episode 9
2020	If My Favorite Pop Idol Made It to the Budokan, I Would Die	Sorane Matsuyama	
2020	Interspecies Reviewers	Erusha	
2020	Seton Academy: Join the Pack!	Hana Hoshino	
2020	Shadowverse	Nii Shindou	
2020	Mewkledreamy	Karin Yamabuki	
2020	Umayon!	Mihono Bourbon	
2021	Umamusume: Pretty Derby Season 2	Mihono Bourbon	
2021	Bottom-tier Character Tomozaki	Minami Nanami	
2021	Fushigi Dagashiya Zenitendō	Kotone Koshiba	
2021	Dragon Goes House-Hunting	Selkie	
2021	Fruits Basket: The Final	Hatori Souma (chilld)	
2021	86	Vladilena Milizé	
2021	How a Realist Hero Rebuilt the Kingdom	Aisha Udgard	
2021	Blue Period	Shirai	
2021	The Way of the Househusband	Fuwafuwa Kitchen Waitress	
2022	Delicious Party Pretty Cure	Wakana Tamaki, Recipeppi, Moe Yamakura	
2022	Miss Shachiku and the Little Baby Ghost	Shino	
2022	Love After World Domination	Desumi Magahara	
2022	In the Heart of Kunoichi Tsubaki	Shion	
2022	My Stepmom's Daughter Is My Ex	Akatsuki Minami	
2022	My Master Has No Tail	Koito	
2022	Bocchi the Rock!	Ikuyo Kita	
2023	Buddy Daddies	Karin Izumi	
2023	Ippon Again!	Kotoko Nogisaka	
2023	Dead Mount Death Play	Furuto Ichinose	
2023	Cute Executive Officer R	Yoshine Fudō	
2023	World Dai Star	Shizuka	
2023	Mashle: Magic and Muscles	Lauren Cabasse	
2023	Mobile Suit Gundam: The Witch from Mercury Season 2	Guel Jeturk (child)	
2023	A Galaxy Next Door	Yuina	
2023	Undead Unluck	Latla	
2023	I'm in Love with the Villainess	Lene Aurousseau	
2023	That Time I Got Reincarnated as a Slime: Visions of Coleus	Jaune	
2024	Bottom-tier Character Tomozaki 2nd Stage	Minami Nanami	
2024	7th Time Loop: The Villainess Enjoys a Carefree Life Married to Her Worst Enemy!	Rishe Irmgard Weitzner	
2024	The Unwanted Undead Adventurer	Sheila Ibarss	
2024	Frieren: Beyond Journey's End	Übel	
2024	The Many Sides of Voice Actor Radio	Otome Sakuranamiki	
2024	Wind Breaker	Kotoha Tachibana	
2024	Alya Sometimes Hides Her Feelings in Russian	Sayaka Taniyama	
2024	Mayonaka Punch	Masaki	
2024	2.5 Dimensional Seduction	Eli	
2024	Oshi no Ko Season 2	Yura Katayose	
2024	Senpai Is an Otokonoko	Otonari-san	
2024	Is It Wrong to Try to Pick Up Girls in a Dungeon? V	Heith Velvet	
2024	Ron Kamonohashi's Forbidden Deductions 2nd Season	Mia Costa	
2025	Catch Me at the Ballpark!	Aona	
2025	My Hero Academia: Vigilantes	Pop Step	
2025	Private Tutor to the Duke's Daughter	Lydia	
2025	Backstabbed in a Backwater Dungeon	Mei	
2025	Chitose Is in the Ramune Bottle	Yuzuki Nanase	
2025	Gnosia	Setsu	
2025	Li'l Miss Vampire Can't Suck Right	Misa Kusunoki	
2025	Ninja vs. Gokudo	Lily	
2026	High School! Kimengumi (2026)	Chie Uru	
2026	My Hero Academia: Vigilantes Season 2	Pop Step	
2026	Cardfight!! Vanguard: Divinez Parallactic Clash	Kurumi Ishikawa	
2026	Oshi no Ko Season 3	Yura Katayose	
2026	Star Detective Precure!	Kurea Howa / Cure Eclair	
2026	I Made Friends with the Second Prettiest Girl in My Class	Nina Nitta	
2026	Beyond Twilight	Tsukasa Iijima	
2026	The Klutzy Class Monitor and the Girl with the Short Skirt	Lyric Kohinata	
2026	Kill Blue	Mai Otohime	
2026	Iron Wok Jan	Kiriko Gobanchō	
2026	Oh Boy, Was I Wrong About Her	Haruki Nikaidō	
2026	Young Ladies Don't Play Fighting Games	Aya Mitsuki	
2026	A Livid Lady's Guide to Getting Even: How I Crushed My Homeland with My Mighty Grimoires	Mireille Katarina	
2026	Full Clearing Another World Under a Goddess with Zero Believers	Noah Titan	
2027	I Got a Cheat Skill in Another World and Became Unrivaled in the Real World, Too II	Iris Knowblade	
2027	Soara and the House of Monsters	Soara	
2027	Alya Sometimes Hides Her Feelings in Russian Season 2	Sayaka Taniyama	
2027	Destiny Unchain Online	Kou Mitsuki	
2027	KuKu-Loop: The 100th Time's the Charm	Alphina	

=== Anime films ===
Year	Title	Role(s)
2018	Flavors of Youth	Xiao Yu
2022	Backflip!! Movie	Riku, Tsukidate's Mother
2024	Bocchi the Rock! Re:/Re:Re	Ikuyo Kita
2024	Give It All	Mayumi Imoto
2025	Senpai Is an Otokonoko: Sunshine After the Rain	Otonari-san
2026	Grotesqqque	Unknown
2026	Cardfight!! Vanguard: Divinez Parallactic Fate	Kurumi Ishikawa

=== Video games ===
Year	Title	Role(s)
2017	Genjū Keiyaku Cryptract	Sherida
2017	Tenka Hyakken -Zan-	Kuniyuki Akashi
2020	Azur Lane	Casablanca, Strasbourg
2020	Brown Dust	Rosengart
	Monster Strike	Cthugha, Red Lotus, Claíomh Solais
2021	Blue Archive	Asuna Ichinose
2021	Umamusume: Pretty Derby	Mihono Bourbon
2021	Tsukihime -A piece of blue glass moon-	Arcueid Brunestud
2021	Melty Blood: Type Lumina	Arcueid Brunestud, Red Arcueid and Neco-Arc
2021	Lost Judgment	Yurie Nozaki
2022	Project Sekai: Colorful Stage! feat. Hatsune Miku	Riho Hasegawa
2022	Fate/Grand Order	Arcueid Brunestud (Archetype: Earth)
2022	LACKGIRL I – "Astra inclinant, sed non obligant."	Subaru
2023	Fire Emblem Engage	Citrinne
2023	Goddess of Victory: Nikke	Rosanna
2023	World Dai Star: Yume no Stellarium	Shizuka
2023	GINKA	Ginka
2023	That Time I Got Reincarnated as a Slime: The Saga of How the Demon Lord and Dragon Founded a Nation	Jaune (Primordial of Yellow)
2023	Kyoutou Kotoba RPG: Kotodaman	Willys, Oranche, Ikuyo Kita
2024	Quiz RPG: The World of Mystic Wiz	Sasha Mimei
2024	Unicorn Overlord	Ochlys
2024	Library of Ruina	Angela
2024	Houchi Shoujo	Seiran
2024	Granblue Fantasy	Ami
2024	Hakkenden	Shino Sakura
2024	Festi Battle	Emma
2024	Punishing: Gray Raven	Bridget
2024	Holy Undead ~Himote de Bocchi no Shirei Jutsushi ga, Seijo ni Tensei Shite Otomodachi o Fuyashimasu~	Yuricia Albert
2025	Wuthering Waves	Ciaccona
2025	Zenless Zone Zero	Ukinami Yuzuha
2026	Neverness to Everness	Rin Akane
2026	Petit Planet	Glenn
2027	Fate/Extra Record	Arcueid Brunestud (Berserker)
2027	Romancing SaGa 3: Destinies United	Ellen Carson
2027	Melty Blood: Twi-Lumina	Arcueid Brunestud and Neco Arc

=== Dubbing ===
==== Animation ====
- Tiny Toons Looniversity as Babs Bunny
- Tom and Jerry: The Forbidden Compass as Mega Rat (Young)

==== Live action ====
- Big Shot as Olive
