= Flesh-Colored Horror =

Japanese manga anthology by Junji Ito

- Cover of the volume

肉色の怪 (Niku Iro no Kai)
- Genre: Horror
- Manga
- Written by: Junji Ito
- Published by: Asahi Sonorama
- English publisher: NA: ComicsOne
- Magazine: Monthly Halloween
- Published: December 25, 1997
- Volumes: 1

Flesh-Colored Horror (Japanese: 肉色の怪, Hepburn: Niku Iro no Kai) is a Japanese manga anthology written and illustrated by Junji Ito. Its short stories were serialized in Asahi Sonorama's Monthly Halloween from 1988 to 1997; the anthology was released in December 1997.

== Publication ==
Flesh-Colored Horror is an anthology that collects short stories written and illustrated by Junji Ito in Asahi Sonorama's magazine Monthly Halloween from 1988 to 1997. The anthology was released on December 25, 1997.

ComicsOne published the manga in English.

== Reception ==
Josephine Fortune of Mania felt the stories were scary and liked that the stories covered a broad range of topics. However, Fortune also noted that the art was not on par with other Ito works. A columnist for Manga News felt the collection was nice to read, though they also felt some of Ito's other works were better. In Manga: The Complete Guide, Jason Thompson wrote that "[Ito's] storytelling is clear and his faces and figures are realistic".
