= Ichiko Ima =

Japanese manga artist and writer (born 20th century

Ichiko Ima 今 市子
- Born: April 11 Himi, Toyama, Japan
- Area: Manga artist
- Notable works: Beyond Twilight
- Awards: Excellency Award at Japanese Media Arts Festival 2006 for Beyond Twilight

Ichiko Ima (今 市子, Ima Ichiko; born April 11 in Himi, Toyama, Japan) is a Japanese manga artist.

She is known for her long-running horror manga series Beyond Twilight, serialized since 1995. Blending Japanese folklore with lyrical storytelling and subtle social critique, the series has been critically acclaimed. Ima's work is noted for its delicate visual style, gender-fluid characters, and feminist reinterpretations of horror. She is also an established author in the boys' love genre.

== Life and career ==
She was born in rural Toyama Prefecture. Her grandmother would tell her scary stories before going to bed. She started reading manga through her sister, discovering Kazuo Umezu's horror manga and Masako Watanabe's Garasu no Shiro at an early age. She mostly read shōjo manga and came to appreciate Moto Hagio as her favorite artist.

She started drawing manga in elementary school. In high school, she self-published her own doujinshi. While attending Tokyo Woman's Christian University, she was part of a manga club and learned techniques for drawing manga. After working as an assistant for other manga artists, she finally published her first work as a professional manga artist with the short story "My Beautiful Green Palace" in the magazine Comic Image in 1993.

She sold doujinshi at the Comitia convention and the editor of what would become the horror manga magazine Nemuki discovered her work in a pile of unsold doujinshi. In 1993, she published her first short story in a predecessor of the magazine, for which she would become a regular contributor.

Her biggest commercial and critical success is the series Beyond Twilight, which has run in Nemuki since 1995. The series has also been published by Asahi Sonorama in thirty-one volumes (as of June 2025), which have been sold more than 5.8 million times.

She has also published several boys-love manga. She has regularly contributed to the boys-love magazine Hana Oto since the 1990s.

== Style and themes ==
According to manga scholar Hiromi Tsuchiya Dollase, Ima's manga, particularly her series Beyond Twilight, mixes traditional Japanese supernatural motifs such as marebito, oni, and zashiki warashi with themes drawn from ethnology and classical literature, creating a form of modern yōkai storytelling.

Tsuchiya Dollase analyzes Ima's approach to the shōjo horror genre as feminist. She states that in Ima's work, horror is not presented through bloodshed or violence, but through melancholy, longing, and emotional complexity. Her stories evoke a romanticized vision of Japan's past. Beyond Twilight's main character Iijima Ritsu's gender identity is blurred; he has a unisex name and was raised as a girl. The domestic sphere in Hyakkiyakō Shō is also unconventional: rather than a patriarchal stronghold, the family home is portrayed as a nurturing and egalitarian space. Ritsu's family, including his female cousins with similar supernatural abilities as him, supports rather than represses his spiritual sensitivity, in contrast to the oppressive traditional family structures (ie) often featured in the ghost stories recounted by spirits. These ghost narratives frequently explore the suffering of women under inherited family obligations and supernatural contracts, as in tales involving non-human brides or deities betrayed by humans. Gender roles are repeatedly inverted, with women taking on the roles of seekers or rescuers, and male characters occupying emotionally vulnerable or passive positions.

Ima's style is inspired by the visual and narrative structure of traditional Japanese painting (nihonga), particularly the Hyakkiyakō emaki scrolls. Junko Miura emphasizes that Ima's aesthetic works with delicate linework and muted tones, is not focused on action but on evoking mood and tension. This use of visual restraint, according to Miura, is key to the series' distinctive atmosphere, making the supernatural feel both intimate and unsettling. Miura aligns her ability to draw atmosphere with artist Mariko Iwadate.

Miura also highlights the use of narrative structure and foreshadowing in Ima's storytelling. Although the stories may at first seem disjointed or illogical, they often resolve with satisfying coherence, similar to the denouement in a mystery novel.

== Legacy ==
Hyakkiyakō Shō was critically acclaimed. The series was awarded a Excellence Award at the 2006 Japan Media Arts Festival and was nominated for the Tezuka Osamu Cultural Prize in 2005.

The series has gained some international attention. The first six volumes of the manga have been translated into French and it was being published in Italian, up to volume 9, from 2022 to 2024, until the publisher (Goen) went into bankruptcy. An English translation, titled Beyond Twilight, was announced by Aurora Publishing in 2010, but it was never released due to the publisher's closure. The series was then available digitally on the Jmanga app, but it closed in 2013.

== Works ==
Title	Year	Notes	Refs
Game	1993–1996	published by Issuisha in 1 vol.	
My Beautiful Green Palace (マイ・ビューティフル・グリーンパレス)	1994	Short story collection published by Byakuya Shobo in 1 vol. Includes "My Beautiful Green Palace" (マイ・ビューティフル・グリーンパレス, 1993, published in Comic Image), "Ningyo no Hahen" (1991), "Shouzou" (1991), "Lumpty Stone" (1989), "Saigo no Natsuyasumi" (1990), "Yoru no Shizuku" (1992) and "Rokugatsubyou" (1994)	
Beyond Twilight (百鬼夜行抄, Hyakkiyakō Shō)	since 1995	serialized in Nemuki and Nemuki+ published by Asahi Sonorama in 32 vol. (as of April 2026)	
Otona no Mondai (大人の問題)	1995–1997	serialized in Hana Oto published by Houbunsha in 1 vol.	
Itsutsu no Hako no Monogatari (五つの箱の物語)	1995–1996	published by Zassousha in 1 vol.	
Bunchō-sama to Watashi (文鳥様と私)	since 1996	serialized in Torikko Club, Hamsupe, Mystery sara, Mystery Blanc and Happyō Kikan published by Aoba Shuppan and Seisensha in 25 vol. (as of June 2025)	
Suna no Ue no Rakuen (砂の上の楽園)	1997	Short story collection published by Asahi Sonorama in 1 vol. Includes "Suna no Ue no Rakuen" (砂の上の楽園, 1996, published in Nemuki), "Boku wa Tabi wo suru" (1994, published in Nemuki), "Ame ni Nareba Ii" and "Yoru no Mori no Soko ni" (夜の森の底に, 1997, published in Nemuki)	
Natsukashii Hana no Omoide (懐しい花の思い出)	1998	Short story collection published by Asahi Sonorama in 1 vol. Includes "Natsukashii Hana no Omoide" (懐しい花の思い出, 1994, published in Nemuki), "Natsufuku no Shōjo" (1993, published in Nemuki), "Nemuri ni Tsuku Mae Gyuunyuu wo" (1994, published in Nemuki), "Eudith no Kikan I", "Eudith no Kikan II" and "Kamigami no Hana"	
Ashinaga-ojisantachi no Yukue (あしながおじさん達の行方)	1998–1999	serialized in Hana Oto published by Houbunsha in 2 vol.	
Kotō no himegimi (孤島の姫君)	2001	published by Asahi Sonorama in 1 vol.	
Itoko Dōshi (いとこ同士)	2002	published by Movic in 1 vol.	
Kishibe no Uta (岸辺の唄)	since 2002	published by Shueisha / Home-sha in 11 vol. (as of June 2025)	
Homeless Salaryman (ホームレス・サラリーマン)	since 2013	serialized in Hana Oto published by Houbunsha in 3 vol. (as of June 2025)	
Tanpopo ni Furu Ame (タンポポに降る雨)	2017	published by Gakken Plus in 1 vol.	
