= If My Favorite Pop Idol Made It to the Budokan, I Would Die =

Japanese manga series

- First tankōbon volume cover, featuring (from left to right) Sorane Matsuyama, Yūka Teramoto, Aya Yokota, Maina Ichii, Maki Hakata, Reo Igarashi, and Yumeri Mizumori

推しが武道館いってくれたら死ぬ (Oshi ga Budōkan Ittekuretara Shinu)
- Genre: Comedy
- Manga
- Written by: Auri Hirao
- Published by: Tokuma Shoten
- English publisher: NA: Tokyopop
- Magazine: Monthly Comic Ryū
- Original run: June 19, 2015 – November 28, 2025
- Volumes: 12
- Anime television series
- Directed by: Yusuke Yamamoto
- Written by: Deko Akao
- Music by: Moe Hyūga
- Studio: Eight Bit
- Licensed by: Crunchyroll (Note: In North America through Crunchyroll, LLC (formerly known as Funimation).)
- Original network: TBS, BS-TBS, TBS Channel 1, RSK Television
- Original run: January 10, 2020 – March 27, 2020
- Episodes: 12
- Television drama
- Directed by: Kentarō Ōtani; Hitomi Kitagawa; Akihiko Takaishi
- Written by: Kumiko Motoyama
- Music by: Moe Hyūga
- Original network: ABC, TV Asahi
- Original run: October 9, 2022 – December 25, 2022
- Episodes: 10

If My Favorite Pop Idol Made It to the Budokan, I Would Die (推しが武道館いってくれたら死ぬ, Oshi ga Budōkan Ittekuretara Shinu) is a Japanese manga series by Auri Hirao. It was serialized in Tokuma Shoten's seinen manga magazine Monthly Comic Ryū from June 2015 to November 2025, with its chapters collected in twelve tankōbon volumes. An anime television series adaptation by Eight Bit aired from January to March 2020. A television drama adaptation aired from October to December 2022. A film adaptation was released in May 2023.

== Plot ==
Eripiyo is initially a woman leading a normal life until it is turned upside down after watching a performance of the minor idol group ChamJam, which leads her to becoming obsessed with one of its members, Maina Ichii. Despite Eripiyo's enthusiasm towards her, Maina is consistently the least popular member of the group, leaving Eripiyo to take it upon herself to buy a lot of Maina's merchandise, which mainly involves singles. Due to her using almost all of her money to buy this merchandise, Eripiyo has only a single tracksuit she wears all the time. She frequently goes to ChamJam's concerts with her friends and fellow ChamJam fans: Kumasa, whose favorite is Reo Igarashi, and Motoi, who prefers Sorane Matsuyama. Eripiyo continues to work several part-time jobs to support Maina, and Maina herself increasingly becomes concerned that Eripiyo is pushing herself too hard for her.

== Characters ==
=== Main characters ===
Eripiyo (えりぴよ)
Voiced by: Fairouz Ai (Japanese); Megan Shipman (English)
Portrayed by: Sayuri Matsumura
A normal girl who regularly wears a jersey. She becomes interested in idols after catching a performance of the local idol group ChamJam, becoming fond of its member Maina. She often works part-time jobs to pay for her merchandise, to the point of frequently overworking and falling sick.
Kumasa (くまさ)
Voiced by: Tomoaki Maeno (Japanese); Jim Foronda (English)
Portrayed by: Takao Jitsukata
Motoi (基)
Voiced by: Yoshitaka Yamaya (Japanese); Stephen Fu (English)
Portrayed by: Yudai Toyoda
Reina (玲奈)
Voiced by: Kana Ichinose (Japanese); Apphia Yu (English)
Portrayed by: Hiyori Katada

=== ChamJam ===
Maina Ichii (市井 舞菜, Ichii Maina)
Voiced by: Hina Tachibana (Japanese); Bryn Apprill (English)
Portrayed by: Himena Irei
Reo Igarashi (五十嵐 れお, Igarashi Reo)
Voiced by: Kaede Hondo (Japanese); Dawn M. Bennett (English)
Portrayed by: Riho Nakamura
Sorane Matsuyama (松山 空音, Matsuyama Sorane)
Voiced by: Ikumi Hasegawa (Japanese); Morgan Berry (English)
Portrayed by: Momoe Mori
Maki Hakata (伯方 眞妃, Hakata Maki)
Voiced by: Maya Enoyoshi (Japanese); Giovannie Cruz (English)
Portrayed by: Kano Fujihira
Yumeri Mizumori (水守 ゆめ莉, Mizumori Yumeri)
Voiced by: Kaori Ishihara (Japanese); Natalie Hoover (English)
Portrayed by: Soyoka Yoshida
Yūka Teramoto (寺本 優佳, Teramoto Yūka)
Voiced by: Misaki Watada (Japanese); Lindsay Seidel (English)
Portrayed by: Tsugumi Aritomo
Aya Yokota (横田 文, Yokota Aya)
Voiced by: Manami Itō (Japanese); Dani Chambers (English)
Portrayed by: Miu Wada

== Media ==
=== Manga ===
Written and illustrated by Auri Hirao, If My Favorite Pop Idol Made It to the Budokan, I Would Die was serialized in Tokuma Shoten's seinen manga magazine Monthly Comic Ryū from June 19, 2015, to November 28, 2025. Tokuma Shoten collected its chapters in twelve tankōbon volumes, released from February 13, 2016, to December 12, 2025.

In North America, the manga is licensed by Tokyopop.

==== Volumes ====
No.	Original release date	Original ISBN	English release date	English ISBN
1	February 13, 2016	978-4-19-950491-4	January 27, 2023 (digital); June 13, 2023 (print)	978-1-42-787340-8
Chapters 1–6; Bonus (おまけ, Omake)
2	September 16, 2016	978-4-19-950527-0	April 14, 2023 (digital); August 15, 2023 (print)	978-1-42-787344-6
Chapters 7–12; Bonus (おまけ, Omake)
3	June 13, 2017	978-4-19-950570-6	July 22, 2023 (digital); October 10, 2023 (print)	978-1-42-787420-7
Chapters 13–18
4	May 11, 2018	978-4-19-950622-2	August 30, 2023 (digital); December 12, 2023 (print)	978-1-42-787421-4
Chapters 19–24
5	December 13, 2018	978-4-19-950658-1	March 5, 2024	978-1-42-787534-1
Chapters 25–30
6	October 12, 2019	978-4-19-950689-5	March 30, 2024 (digital); May 7, 2024 (print)	978-1-42-787547-1
Chapters 31–36
7	December 11, 2020	978-4-19-950725-0	July 9, 2024 (print)	978-1-42-787721-5
Chapters 37–42
8	December 13, 2021	978-4-19-950761-8	September 3, 2024 (print)	978-1-42-787814-4
Chapters 43–48
9	September 13, 2022	978-4-19-950789-2	November 5, 2024 (print)	978-1-42-787798-7
Chapters 49–52; "Maple Doll 4-Koma" (めいぷる4コマ, Meipuru Yonkoma); "Stellights 4-Koma" (ステライツ4コマ, Suteraitsu Yonkoma)
10	January 13, 2024	978-4-19-950841-7	December 3, 2024 (print)	978-1-42-787828-1
Chapters 53–57
11	December 13, 2024	978-4-19-950887-5	April 28, 2026 (print)	978-1-42-788602-6
Chapters 58–62
12	December 12, 2025	978-4-19-950938-4	—	—
Chapters 63–66

=== Anime ===
An anime adaptation was announced in the July issue of Monthly Comic Ryū magazine on May 18, 2018. The series was animated by Eight Bit and directed by Yusuke Yamamoto, with Deko Akao handling the series' composition, Tomoyuki Shitaya and Masaru Yonezawa designing the characters, and Moe Hyūga composing the music. It aired from January 10 to March 27, 2020, on TBS and BS-TBS. (Note: TBS listed the series premiere at 25:28 on January 9, 2020, which is January 10 at 1:28 a.m.) The opening theme song "Clover wish" is performed by ChamJam, while the ending theme song is a cover of Aya Matsuura's "Momoiro Kataomoi" by Eripiyo (Fairouz Ai). The series ran for 12 episodes.

Funimation licensed the series for a SimulDub.

==== Episodes ====
No.	Title (Note: All English titles are taken from Funimation.)	Original release date
1	"But I Love That Maina"; Transliteration: "Sonna Maina o Aishiteru" (Japanese: そんな舞菜を愛してる)	January 10, 2020
2	"I Always Want to Love You the Most"; Transliteration: "Ichiban Suki de Itai" (Japanese: いちばん好きでいたい)	January 17, 2020
3	"Do You Like Me?"; Transliteration: "Watashi no Koto Suki desu ka?" (Japanese: わたしのこと好きですか？)	January 24, 2020
4	"I Promise to Make You Number 1"; Transliteration: "Zettai, Ichii ni Suru kara" (Japanese: 絶対、1位にするから)	January 31, 2020
5	"I Can Only Wait"; Transliteration: "Watashi wa Matsu Koto Shika Dekinai" (Japanese: わたしは待つことしかできない)	February 7, 2020
6	"You Were My Everything"; Transliteration: "Boku no Subete ga Kimi datta" (Japanese: ぼくの全てが君だった)	February 14, 2020
7	"Run for Maina's Sake"; Transliteration: "Maina no Tame ni Hashirun da" (Japanese: 舞菜のために走るんだ)	February 21, 2020
8	"I Want You in My Future"; Transliteration: "Watashi no Mirai ni Ite Hoshii" (Japanese: わたしの未来にいてほしい)	February 28, 2020
9	"Not as a Wota, But as a Person"; Transliteration: "Otaku Janaku Hitori no Ningen toshite" (Japanese: オタクじゃなく一人の人間として)	March 6, 2020
10	"Your Fave Isn't Your Friend"; Transliteration: "Oshi wa Tomodachi Janai kara" (Japanese: 推しは友達じゃないから)	March 13, 2020
11	"The Closest Miracle to Me"; Transliteration: "Ichiban, Mijika ni Aru Kiseki" (Japanese: いちばん、身近にある奇跡)	March 20, 2020
12	"If My Favorite Pop Idol Made It to the Budokan"; Transliteration: "Oshi ga Budōkan Ittekuretara" (Japanese: 推しが武道館いってくれたら)	March 27, 2020

=== TV drama ===
In the seventh volume of the series, a live-action adaptation was announced. It was later revealed to be a television drama, starring Sayuri Matsumura as Eripiyo. The series was directed by Kentarō Ōtani, Hitomi Kitagawa, and Akihiko Takaishi, based on a screenplay by Kumiko Motoyama, and the music was composed by Moe Hyūga. The four members of the girl group @onefive were also cast as members of ChamJam, and their song "Miraizu" was featured as the theme song. The drama aired on ABC TV and TV Asahi for ten episodes from October 9 to December 25, 2022.

=== Film ===
On January 17, 2023, it was announced that a live-action film adaptation of the manga would be released on May 12, 2023. All of the TV drama's main cast members reprised their roles. The story centers on ChamJam's concert in Tokyo and Maina's concerns about her lack of charm and ability as an idol. "Chance" by @onefive was used as the theme song.

=== Album ===
On May 10, 2023, a two-disc album titled I Live For You (きみのために生きてる, Kimi no Tame ni Ikiteru) was released by Pony Canyon. It features ChamJam songs from the anime on the first disc, and from the live-action drama and film on the second disc.

=== Stage Play ===
In February 2026, a stage play adaptation was performed in Japan starring Aika Kobayashi as Eripiyo and members of SKE48 as ChamJam.

== Reception ==
In 2017, the series was ranked eleventh in the third Next Manga Awards in the print category.

By May 2023, the manga had over 1 million copies in circulation.
