= Blue Hole (manga) =

Japanese manga series

- First tankōbon volume cover of Blue Hole, featuring Gaia Nagili

ブルーホール (Burū Hōru)
- Genre: Adventure; Science fiction
- Manga
- Written by: Yukinobu Hoshino
- Published by: Kodansha
- Imprint: Mr. Magazine KC Deluxe
- Magazine: Mr. Magazine
- Original run: May 1991 – November 1992
- Volumes: 2
- Manga

Blue World
- Written by: Yukinobu Hoshino
- Published by: Kodansha
- Imprint: Afternoon KC Deluxe
- Magazine: Monthly Afternoon
- Original run: February 25, 1995 – August 25, 1997
- Volumes: 4
- icon

Blue Hole (Japanese: ブルーホール, Hepburn: Burū Hōru) is a Japanese manga series written and illustrated by Yukinobu Hoshino. It was serialized in Kodansha's seinen manga magazine Mr. Magazine from May 1991 to November 1992, with its chapters collected in two tankōbon volumes. The story is about the discovery of a gateway in time and space deep underwater which allows for travel between the present day and the age of the dinosaurs.

A sequel, titled Blue World, was serialized in Kodansha's seinen manga magazine Monthly Afternoon from February 1995 to August 1997, with its chapters collected in four volumes.

== Synopsis ==
=== Blue Hole ===
Scattered across Earth's oceans are large caverns in the seabed known as blue holes. Close to the Comoro Islands is one such hole, where an unusually large population of the endangered gombessa thrive. After a fishing incident near the hole that ends with a mysterious sea creature destroying the boat and killing off most of its crew, a research vessel approaches and rescues its sole survivor: a young Comorian villager named Gaia Nagili, whose grandfather was killed in the attack. Hearing her claims of a possible gombessa nest within the Blue Hole, the captain allows Gaia to join in on a deep-sea expedition into the hole, where they encounter live sea creatures from the age of the dinosaurs.

During another deep-sea expedition near the Blue Hole, the vessel is suddenly caught in a whirlpool and ejected through the other side, where Gaia and the other survivors realize the hole is actually a time portal to Earth during its late Cretaceous period. As the group try to survive in a world of dinosaurs both friendly and violent, they soon discover other Blue Holes centred around massive "marine trees" that lead to other periods in Earth's history. Meanwhile, one survivor, influential scientist Charles Hawk, secretly declares his plan to enact "Project Blue Hole", to create a pipeline through the original Blue Hole and extract resources from the past Earth to the present.

== Publication ==
Written and illustrated by Yukinobu Hoshino, Blue Hole was serialized in Kodansha's seinen manga magazine Mr. Magazine from May 1991 to November 1992. (Note: Blue Hole debuted in the magazine's second issue of 1991, cover dated May 22. It finished in the magazine's 22nd issue of 1992, cover dated November 25.) Kodansha collected its chapters in two tankōbon volumes, released on August 8, 1992, and February 9, 1993. It was later republished in one bunkobon volume on March 12, 2002, and in two tankōbon volumes on February 6, 2012.

Its sequel, Blue World (ブルー・ワールド, Burū Wārudo), was serialized in Kodansha's seinen manga magazine Monthly Afternoon from February 25, 1995, (Note: Debuted in the magazine's April 1995 issue, released on February 25, 1995.) to August 25, 1997. (Note: Finished in the magazine's October 1997 issue, released on August 25, 1997.) Kodansha collected its chapters in four tankōbon volumes, released from April 23, 1996, to April 23, 1998. It was later republished in two bunkobon volumes between May 11 and June 12, 2001, and in three tankōbon volumes between November 22, 2012, and January 23, 2013.

=== Volumes ===
No.	Release date	ISBN
1	August 8, 1992	978-4-06-313299-1
2	February 9, 1993	978-4-06-319349-7

=== Blue World volumes ===
No.	Release date	ISBN
1	April 23, 1996	978-4-06-319695-5
2	March 21, 1997	978-4-06-319785-3
3	October 23, 1997	978-4-06-319863-8
4	April 23, 1998	978-4-06-319933-8
