= My Roommate Is a Cat =

Japanese manga series and its adaptation(s)

- Cover of the first tankōbon volume, featuring Haru (above) and Subaru Mikazuki (below)

同居人はひざ、時々、頭のうえ。 (Dōkyonin wa Hiza, Tokidoki, Atama no Ue)
- Genre: Iyashikei
- Manga
- Written by: Minatsuki
- Illustrated by: Asu Futatsuya
- Published by: Flex Comix
- English publisher: NA: Lezhin Comics
- Magazine: Comic Polaris
- Original run: June 2015 – present
- Volumes: 12
- Anime television series
- Directed by: Kaoru Suzuki
- Written by: Deko Akao
- Music by: Kotringo
- Studio: Zero-G
- Licensed by: NA: Crunchyroll; UK: Universal Pictures UK; SEA: Muse Communication
- Original network: AT-X, ABC, Tokyo MX, BS11
- Original run: January 9, 2019 – March 27, 2019
- Episodes: 12
- icon

My Roommate Is a Cat (同居人はひざ、時々、頭のうえ。, Dōkyonin wa Hiza, Tokidoki, Atama no Ue.; transl. "My Housemate Is on My Lap, But Sometimes, on My Head") is a Japanese manga series written by Minatsuki and illustrated by Asu Futatsuya, serialized online via Flex Comix's Comic Polaris website since June 2015. It has been collected in twelve tankōbon volumes. An anime television series adaptation produced by Zero-G aired from January to March 2019.

== Plot ==
One day, a socially awkward and eccentric writer, Subaru Mikazuki, takes in a stray cat, which he later names Haru, by chance. Not only does this give him the idea for his next book, but it serving as the push he needs to get out of his funk, and stop isolating himself, causing him to interact with others more, and deal with the feelings he has from the death of his parents. The story is shown from the perspectives of Subaru and Haru.

== Characters ==
Subaru Mikazuki (朏 素晴, Mikazuki Subaru)
Voiced by: Kenshō Ono, Riho Sugiyama (young) (Japanese); Austin Tindle, Rachel Michelle Thompson (young) (English)
A 23-year-old introverted mystery writer, who adopts Haru by chance. While he initially remains distant, they gradually bond with each other. Part of the story is shown from his point of view. Initially before the death of his parents he was always reluctant to visit crowded places, but after Haru entered his life, he understood the real value of love and started to interact with people better.
Haru (陽 (ハル))
Voiced by: Haruka Yamazaki (Japanese); Jad Saxton (English)
A stray Tuxedo cat, adopted by Subaru. Her life prior to being adopted was rough; she was trained by Miz Tora to survive in this harsh world and she took care of her four younger siblings and struggled to feed herself and them. She and Subaru rarely understand each other, but their misunderstandings lead to a common goal. Part of the story is shown from her point of view. She initially believes that her name is a sign for food as that's the name of the girl who once gave her food.
Atsushi Kawase (河瀬 篤, Kawase Atsushi)
Voiced by: Hiro Shimono (Japanese); Jessie James Grelle (English)
Subaru's editor at the publishing company. He tries hard to get Subaru to get out of the house, but often to no avail. He is fond of cats, especially Haru, and frequently visits the two.
Nana Ōkami (押守 なな, Ōkami Nana)
Voiced by: Chika Anzai (Japanese); Alexis Tipton (English)
Clerk at Sunny's Pet Store with a fondness for cats. She helps Subaru learn to care for Haru. Has two cats. One cat is Haru's younger brother.
Hiroto Yasaka (矢坂 大翔, Yasaka Hiroto)
Voiced by: Shun Horie, Ikumi Hasegawa (young) (Japanese); Kyle Igneczi, Morgan Berry (young) (English)
Subaru's childhood friend. He often visits unannounced to drop off food for his friend, since Subaru doesn't cook and rarely has any food in the refrigerator.
Yūgo Ōkami (押守 優伍, Ōkami Yūgo)
Voiced by: Yoshiki Nakajima (Japanese); Joe Cucinotti (English)
Nana's younger brother, a 2nd-year high school student, and a fan of Subaru's novels. He visits his elder sister Nana and also loves cats.
Hachi (はち)
Voiced by: Ayumu Murase (Japanese); Kimberly Grace (English)
Nana's Tuxedo Cat and Haru's brother.
Roku (ろく)
Voiced by: Kenjirō Tsuda (Japanese); Jarrod Greene (English)
Nana's 3-year-old cat.
Tarō (タロウ)
Voiced by: Tomokazu Sugita (Japanese); Anthony Bowling (English)
A happy and friendly Golden Retriever who lives next door to Subaru and Haru.
Nagisa Yasaka (矢坂 渚, Yasaka Nagisa)
Voiced by: Hisako Tōjō (Japanese); Sarah Wiedenheft (English)
Hiroto's 17-year-old sister who has a crush on Subaru.
Tora-nee-san (トラ姉さん)
Voiced by: Megumi Toyoguchi (Japanese); Jamie Marchi (English)
Female Tiger Cat who taught Haru and her siblings to survive on the street.
Haru Akimoto (秋元 春, Akimoto Haru)
Voiced by: Yoshino Nanjō (Japanese); Emily Hornsby (English)
Narumi's classmate and Haru's namesake. Her family runs a chūka restaurant. She's amongst the children who's fond of cats, especially a stray cat who keep visiting her family restaurant to eat good food before she was named after the girl who befriend her. Haru wanted to keep the stray cat, but after getting many things, the cat who visits stop showing up. Eventually she find the same cat living with Subaru and had the same name as Haru's, She was happy that Haru living as Subaru's cat even though she wished that she could've taken Haru in sooner, until she chooses to take in one of the lost stray kittens to her home that Subaru find underneath his house.
Natsuko Akimoto (夏子 秋元, Akimoto Natsuko)
Voiced by: Sachiko Kojima (Japanese); Nazia Chaudhry (English)
Haru's mother.
Kuro (クロ)
Voiced by: Daisuke Ono (Japanese); Cris George (English)
A stray black cat who was friends with Tora.
Hayato Yasaka (矢坂 隼翔, Yasaka Hayato)
Voiced by: Makoto Koichi (Japanese); Meli Grant (English)
Narumi's twin brother.
Narumi Yasaka (矢坂 鳴海, Yasaka Narumi)
Voiced by: Risae Matsuda (Japanese); Felecia Angelle (English)
Hayato's twin sister.
Misora Yasaka (矢坂 海空)
Voiced by: Anzu Haruno (Japanese); Emi Lo (English)
Hiroto's 3-year-old sister.
Sonoko Tanabe (田辺 苑子)
Voiced by: Mika Kanda (Japanese); Samantha Herek (English)
Subaru's neighbor and Taro's owner.
Kazuhiro Mikazuki (朏 和宏, Mikazuki Kazuhiro) & Saho Mikazuki (朏 佐保, Mikazuki Saho)
Voiced by: Hiromichi Kogami (Kazuhiro) & Sayaka Ohara (Saho), Jeremy Inman (Kazuhiro) & Joanna Beatty (Saho)
Subaru's parents who were killed in a tour bus collision before the story begins.

== Media ==
=== Manga ===
The series has been licensed in English by Lezhin Comics.

| No. | Release date | ISBN |
|---|---|---|
| 1 | October 15, 2015 | 978-4-86675-963-0 |
| 2 | June 15, 2016 | 978-4-86675-972-2 |
| 3 | February 15, 2017 | 978-4-86675-981-4 |
| 4 | January 25, 2018 | 978-4-86675-993-7 |
| 5 | December 13, 2018 | 978-4-86675-040-8 |
| 6 | December 12, 2019 | 978-4-86675-087-3 |
| 7 | December 15, 2020 | 978-4-86675-132-0 |
| 8 | December 15, 2021 | 978-4-86675-182-5 |
| 9 | December 15, 2022 | 978-4-86675-258-7 |
| 10 | December 15, 2023 | 978-4-86675-328-7 |
| 11 | December 13, 2024 | 978-4-86675-398-0 |
| 12 | December 15, 2025 | 978-4-86675-473-4 |

=== Anime ===
The anime adaption aired from January 9 to March 27, 2019, on AT-X, ABC, Tokyo MX and BS11. The series is animated by Zero-G and directed by Kaoru Suzuki, with Deku Akao handled the series composition, and Masaru Kitao designed the characters. Schrödinger's Cat and Kotringo performed the series' opening theme song "Unknown World" (アンノウンワールド), while Yoshino Nanjō performed the series' ending theme song "Kimi no Tonari Watashi no Basho" (君のとなり わたしの場所). The series ran for 12 episodes. Crunchyroll streamed the series, while Funimation produced the English dub. Following Sony's acquisition of Crunchyroll, the dub was moved to Crunchyroll.

| No. | Title | Original release date |
|---|---|---|
| 1 | "An Encounter with the Unknown"; Transliteration: "Michi to no Sōgū" (Japanese: 未知との遭遇) | January 9, 2019 |
While visiting his parents' grave, novelist Subaru Mikazuki has a chance encounter with a stray cat and brings it home to live with him. He watches the cat behave in unexpected ways leading him to come up with all kinds of ideas for his next novel to share with his new editor, Atsushi Kawase. While working nonstop on his novel to meet a deadline, the cat starts scattering food on the ground and scratching the door to his room. The cat reacts angrily when Subaru tosses the scattered food into the trash. The next day, the cat scatters food again and Subaru overexerts himself causing him to collapse. Concerned about him not answering his phone, Kawase breaks into Subaru's home to wake him up and Subaru sees that he ate the scattered cat food. The events of the episode are then told from the cat's perspective as the cat followed Subaru because he had food. Unaware that cat food is not intended for human consumption, she offered some of her own food to return the favor after seeing him working hard without eating, and got angry for wasting it as food was hard to come by while she was a stray.
| 2 | "I Call to You"; Transliteration: "Kimi o Yobu" (Japanese: 君を呼ぶ) | January 16, 2019 |
The cat sleeps on Subaru's laptop, preventing him from working. Hoping to get her off by offering her food, Subaru finds out that he is out of cat food. He reluctantly goes to a store and then a pet shop, where the clerk Nana Ōkami asks him several questions about his cat, including what the cat's name is. After Kawase phones him to name his cat in the novel, he begins to think about names for the cat. He returns home and finds the cat nestled in his reference books. After Subaru speaks out a bunch of random names, he gets a reaction to the name Haru, which is connected to a book he had when he was a child. From Haru's perspective, the laptop was a warm place until it powered down, leading her to discover Hiroto in the apartment dropping off food, and the box of reference materials. Her reaction to the name came from the name of a girl who once fed her, and ever since then the name became synonymous with food.
| 3 | "I Touch You"; Transliteration: "Kimi ni Fureru" (Japanese: 君に触れる) | January 23, 2019 |
Haru messes up Subaru's parents' altar, and as Subaru cleans it up, he recalls his parents. They loved to travel, but Subaru would not join them on their trips in order to keep reading books. Kawase makes a visit to Subaru's house to talk business and convince Subaru to hold the meeting outside his house, but to no avail. Subaru is interrupted again when Haru messes up his manuscript, and once more when his pen runs out of ink. While getting some more ink, he stumbles upon an old picture album of his parents that Haru knocks over. He recalls their deaths that happened when a tour bus they were riding got in an accident. That got him to realize that he needs the emotional support that Haru has been providing, and Subaru accept Haru as a member of the family. From Haru's perspective, she reacts to the spirits of Subaru's late parents that only she could see, leading her to mess up the altar. Then, she chases them to the album. Having been accepted by Subaru, his parents pass on thanking her for looking after Subaru.
| 4 | "For You"; Transliteration: "Kimi no Tame" (Japanese: 君のため) | January 30, 2019 |
Kawase tells Subaru to get a collar for Haru. Subaru returns to the pet shop to buy a collar, and Nana reminds him that he needs to make a visit to the veterinarian as stray cats usually carry diseases. At the veterinarian, Haru is examined and while waiting for Subaru and she is apparently frightened by the other animals there. Subaru takes Haru home and sees Nana passing by as she lives in the same neighborhood. Subaru puts the collar on Haru and succeeds after luring her out with food. From Haru's perspective, she was frightened by what the veterinarian was trying to do with her, and while it appeared to Subaru that the dog, revealed to be his next door neighbor's pet named Taro, was threatening Haru, the two were actually trying to become friends and Taro got too excited. Back home, Haru loves the bell part of her collar, but Subaru removed it because it was too much of a distraction for his work.
| 5 | "What I Want to Tell You"; Transliteration: "Kimi ni Tsutaetaikoto" (Japanese: 君に伝えたいこと) | February 6, 2019 |
Nana visits Subaru's home and sees that he gives Haru too much food. To gradually decrease the intake, she gives him a bottle that dispenses food by rolling so that Haru can eat and exercise at the same time. Nana leaves forgetting to take her home key with her, and Haru is too attached to it that she would not let go. Subaru takes Haru to Nana's apartment and he meets her two cats Roku and Hachi. Haru becomes highly attached to Hachi. From Haru's perspective, the Nana's apartment key has a familiar smell prompting her to take possession of it. Hachi turns out to be Haru's little brother, and Haru becomes friends with Roku. Episode ends with arrival of Yūgo, Nana's little brother and asking Subaru his relationship with Nana.
| 6 | "What Connects Us"; Transliteration: "Tsunagarumono" (Japanese: つながるもの) | February 13, 2019 |
Nana clears the air and introduces her brother Yūgo, who happens to be a big fan of Subaru's novels. Shortly afterwards, Subaru heads back home with Haru. From Haru's perspective, she is happy to see Hachi again, but feels that her new purpose in life is to provide companionship to Subaru as he now considers him family in addition to Hachi. On the way home, she recalls her time as an abandoned kitten with four younger siblings (three younger brothers including Hachi and one younger sister). They were helped out by a stray tiger cat, Tora, and a stray black cat, Kuro, to build up their survival instincts. Two of Haru's siblings were adopted by a family during a picnic leaving Haru with just Hachi and one other brother. Then one day, the cats were threatened by crows and Tora and Kuro would fight them to allow Haru and her brothers to get away, which would be the last time she saw those two. While Haru was searching for food, Hachi went missing, while the other brother was tortured to death by crows. The episode ends with Kawase coming over with a bag full of fan mail for his latest novel with one of the letters coming from Yūgo.
| 7 | "Ones Who Can't Be Controlled"; Transliteration: "Gyosenu Kimitachi" (Japanese: 御せぬ君たち) | February 20, 2019 |
Kawase asks Subaru to hold a book signing event, but he refuses. Later that day, Subaru's childhood friend Hiroto Yasaka comes over with his siblings Nagisa, Hayato, Narumi, and Misora with his parents out of town on a business trip. The kids play with Haru while Subaru is overwhelmed by their presence. They order takeout from a local chūka restaurant and then the children play hide and seek. After the kids return home that night, Subaru changes his mind about the book signing event as he falls asleep. From Haru's perspective, she kept her guard up after what Tora taught her, but also remembers to protect the small ones, thus Haru does not attack the children. When dinner arrives, she reunites with the girl she is named after, Haru Akimoto, who went with her mother to deliver the food. Having not seen the cat for a while, Akimoto is glad to see that the cat is being taken care of. After the kids return home, she is exhausted much like Subaru and falls asleep beside him. The next day, Subaru sees that the children scribbled on a blank manuscript page.
| 8 | "Because You're Here"; Transliteration: "Kimi ga Iru Kara" (Japanese: 君がいるから) | February 27, 2019 |
Subaru has writer's block, he falls asleep and recalls his childhood. Hiroto's family moved in next door while he was young, and he would always keep read a book at every opportunity. While in college, he won the grand prize in a mystery novel writing contest that got his career off the ground. That night, Subaru wakes up and finds the kitchen to be a mess after Hiroto nearly stepped on Haru's tail by accident and dropped the groceries out of the bag. Hiroto returns a book he borrowed from his high school days, and Subaru later collapses having come down with a cold. Kawase comes to help him out, and then Subaru falls asleep with Haru sitting on top of his chest. Everything that has happened got Subaru to realize that even with his parents gone, there is no empty feeling in the house. From Haru's perspective, she tried to get Subaru some food. She got a can of cat food from a cabinet, but it rolled away and while trying to retrieve it, a can fell on her head blinding her and inadvertently causing Hiroto to fall down. She jumped on Subaru's chest to protect him. Later that night, Haru jumps off Subaru's chest to eat the can of food, while Hiroto and Kawase wrap a leek around Subaru's neck.
| 9 | "I Reach Out to You"; Transliteration: "Kimi ni Sashidasu" (Japanese: 君にさしだす) | March 6, 2019 |
Subaru leaves home for the bookstore to hold the book signing event. While he is away, Haru has an anxiety attack believing that Subaru is abandoning her. After seeing the neighbors come home to Taro, Haru gets paranoid and makes a mess of the house. Meanwhile, Subaru is nervous when he is sitting across a large number of fans lined up, but Kawase helps him to relax by telling him that he only needs to sign his name. The event is successful as his nervousness lessens with every book he signs. Nana comes by on Yūgo's behalf and learns that he is the author Mikazuki-sensei. Remembering that he forgot to thank his readers and doing it again for Nana, Subaru shouts his gratitude as Nana walks away. Subaru returns home thinking that a burglar had ransacked his home, but finds out that it was Haru's doing and falls asleep.
| 10 | "Eating Together"; Transliteration: "Issho Gohan" (Japanese: いっしょごはん) | March 13, 2019 |
After making a deadline and sleeping for half a day, Subaru wakes up with Narumi and her friend Haru Akimoto coming over to his house. Akimoto cooks her dish that she used to feed Haru while she was a stray at the house, and the three eat food prepared by Akimoto's mother. The next day, Subaru is left with a recipe for cooking Haru's meal and decides to try and cook it himself. He goes to the grocery store and is overwhelmed as he ends up with more groceries than he needs due to the pushy salespeople. He runs into Hiroto, who tells him what he needs and calmly returns what he does not. Subaru returns home and after struggling, he makes Haru's meal. From Haru's perspective, she shows concern over Subaru not eating, but she eats her meals so quickly that by the time she thinks about him, the food is all gone not realizing that he already has food. When she is fed the meal Subaru cooked, she refrained from eating until she saw that Subaru had his own meal.
| 11 | "Feelings Crossing"; Transliteration: "Meguru Omoi" (Japanese: 巡る想い) | March 20, 2019 |
Out of ideas for his next novel, Subaru sees some flowers in his garden that he does not remember were there and waters them. He finds an empty flower bed that was intended to be for flowers from Tokushima, a place his parents were planning to visit before the tour bus accident claimed their lives. Subaru decides to make a trip to Tokushima for a night, and instead of sending Haru to a pet hotel, he leaves her at home and asks Hiroto to fill her food dish three times a day. Subaru stays at the inn his parents had reservations for three years ago and reflects positively on his experience. The next day, he purchases seeds for indigo flowers for the empty flower bed. A sudden storm arrives, leaving Subaru stranded in Tokushima and worried about Haru not anticipating a longer stay. Meanwhile back at the house, Subaru's extended absence has Haru worried.
| 12 | "You and I"; Transliteration: "Kimi to Boku to" (Japanese: 君と僕と) | March 27, 2019 |
Unable to catch his flight home due to the storm, Subaru takes a bullet train back home and calls Hiroto take care of Haru. When Hiroto goes to Subaru's house, the strong winds prevent him from closing the door and Haru leaves the house to look for Subaru. As Subaru arrives home, he searches around the neighborhood looking for Haru, and gets help from Kawase, Nana, and Yūgo. Subaru eventually finds Haru by a creek near his family's grave and rescues her from being washed away. Afterwards, the storm stops and Subaru returns home with Nana giving Haru a bath and Hiroto cooking the ramen brought home from Tokushima for dinner. The next day, Subaru plants the indigo seeds and starts his new novel with Haru sitting on his lap, and then climbing onto his head.

== Reception ==
Anime News Network had five editors review the first episode of the anime: James Beckett found the first half with Subaru the weakest part, but praised the second half when moving from the cat's perspective; Theron Martin praised the "technical merits" of the premiere for showcasing a "more balanced and natural portrayal" of the cat and its point of view; Paul Jensen was critical of Subaru's introduction and a lack of "emotional drama" in his arc, but was hopeful of his growing development in the series and his adventures being retold from the cat's perspective, calling it "an enjoyable slice of life story" that will grab viewers outside of its core audience; Rebecca Silverman wrote that: "I'm not sure it will be able to sustain itself, but if a pet's ever made a difference in your life, this is worth checking out." The fifth reviewer, Nick Creamer, felt that Subaru's story contained "superfluous" interactions with other people, "insubstantial" humor and "purely functional" animation but gave praise to the cat's retelling of the events, concluding that: "In the end, My Roommate is a Cat is too lukewarm in its comedy and limited in its aesthetics to really grab me, but still offers a fairly reasonable premiere. If you're a big fan of all things cat, maybe give this one a try."

Silverman reviewed the complete anime series in 2020 and gave it an A− grade. While finding the flashbacks "a bit heavy-handed" when depicting both characters' lives before they met, she praised the accurate portrayal of cat behavior and the respectful exploration of both Subaru and Haru's anxiety problems, concluding that: "My Roommate is a Cat is definitely a cat person show, but it's also one for anybody who's anxious or understands the comfort of having an animal to make the world less scary. It has its heavy moments, but that just means that when things get lighter, we can really feel like maybe it'll all be okay." Stig Høgset, writing for THEM Anime Reviews, also praised the series for capturing "general kitty behavior" that's similar to Sketchbook ~full color's~ and utilizing a "restrained tone" when portraying its human and animal cast throughout the episodes, concluding that: "[T]here is a certain delightfulness to the antics of the characters in this show, including the animals, and that's why you should give My Roommate is a Cat a go." The series was nominated for Best Comedy at the 4th Crunchyroll Anime Awards, but lost to Kaguya-sama: Love Is War.
