= Setsu =

Gnosia character

- Gnosia character
- Setsu in Gnosia
- First game: Gnosia (2019)
- Designed by: Toru Kawakatsu
- Voiced by: EN: Morgan Berry (anime); JA: Ikumi Hasegawa (anime)

Setsu (Japanese: セツ) is a character in the 2019 video game Gnosia. They are a non-binary soldier who, along with 13 other non-player characters, attempts to escape the threat of the Gnosia Plague, but finds themselves, alongside the player character, in a never-ending loop due to each possessing an entity called the Silver Key. This object wants to acquire knowledge, and will only end the loop once enough knowledge is acquired.

They were envisioned as a fierce and aggressive character who valued justice, though this ended up causing them to make clumsy decisions. Their creator, Toru Kawakatsu, found this cute, and despite consideration to tweak their aggression levels, they found a workaround to keep this without negatively impacting the gameplay experience. Setsu was generally well received, with critics praising and analyzing the depiction of Setsu as a non-binary character. They were ranked the number one best indie video game character in Dengeki's 2022 indie games award show.

== Concept and creation ==
Setsu is a character in the video game Gnosia, who serves as a companion to the player. They are a non-binary soldier who, through a series of circumstances, finds themselves in a dimensional loop. They were designed by Toru Kawakatsu, alias Mazukare, who intended them to be a fierce, aggressive person with a strong sense of justice. Setsu ended up being designed to have a clumsy side, which Mazukare found cute, though he did not initially intend this to be a trait. He discussed how he intended these traits to become evident through gameplay, citing how Setsu's attempts to put the character Yuriko into cold sleep after a confrontation demonstrated their aggression. This aggression, they found, made Setsu more likely to be put into cold sleep themselves. They discussed whether they should tweak their aggression levels; however, they also didn't want to change their character for their own convenience. In turn, they decided that, on the next attempt in this scenario between Setsu and Yuriko, the player would instead be given the option to tell them to tone it down.

== Appearances ==
In Gnosia, Setsu, along with 13 other non-player characters, boards a refugee ship to escape the Gnosia; however, due to a Gnosia getting on board and a resulting paradox, Setsu and the player-character find themselves in a loop. The two work together to escape from the loop, accomplishing this by each gathering information for the Silver Key, an entity that puts a person through a loop in order to get information. Their goal is to gather enough information on each crew member that the Silver Key ends the loops.

As the player progresses through the story, they eventually find themselves in the beginning of the story, where Setsu nearly dies. In order to save them, the player gives them their Silver Key, which puts them in the loop but keeps them alive.

They appear in an anime adaptation of the video game, where they are voiced by Ikumi Hasegawa in Japanese, and Morgan Berry in English.

== Promotion and reception ==
A special edition of Gnosia for the Switch came with a reversible jacket featuring Setsu, as well as hair pins and ear buds based on them. A collaboration between Gnosia and the brand Village Vanguard lead to multiple pieces of merchandise featuring Setsu, including a coffee mug, hoodie, and tapestry. People who purchase these items may receive a bonus item in the form of a special illustration of Setsu. Other Village Vanguard merchandise created in collaboration include a coach jacket, a tin badge, and a bag. Taito stocked various collectibles related to Setsu. These include a plush, as well as a body pillow and accessories case, the latter two featuring them among other characters. There was also a collaboration between Gnosia and GraffArtCAFE, which included art depicting Setsu and a drink based on Setsu. For those who pre-ordered Gnosia through Amazon.co.jp, a bonus art piece depicting Setsu could be obtained with it as part of a limited edition. Those who pre-ordered Gnosia from Ami Ami received a set of pins, which included Setsu.

Since appearing in Gnosia, Setsu has received generally positive reception, voted as the best indie character of 2022 as part of Dengeki's 2022 indie awards. Dengeki writer Sayako Tojo felt that one could not discuss Gnosia without discussing Setsu as well. She discussed how Setsu is neither a lover or family of the player, stating that it was a kind of relationship that transcended words. She expressed how much she loved Setsu, and how the thoughts of them could bring her to tears. Fellow IGN Japan writer Kagami Toshin, while discussing memories of Gnosia characters, felt Setsu was cute when they become clumsy, talking about how the feelings they have for the characters keep piling up. Den Fami Nico Gamer staff discussed how discussed how Setsu changes as Gnosia, noting how they go from being a friendly character to ruthless, which they felt highlighted the seriousness of Setsu's character. Jeux Video staff discussed how Setsu is easily trusted, calling them charismatic nature and sense of justice.

Their gender and sexuality has been the subject of conversation. IGN Japan writer Takuya Watanabe discussed how they did not view Setsu as mere friend or lover, but their best buddy. They felt that Setsu's role in the game highlighted the relationship between the game and the player. They viewed Setsu as a representative of the game itself, saying they're non-binary because a game itself cannot be male or female. They elaborated, noting that Setsu is both the first and last character the player sees in the game, and Setsu thanking the player directly instead of the player character, noting that this was Gnosia itself thanking the player. RPGFan writer Audra Bowling identified Setsu, alongside Raqio, as a standout member of Gnosia. They appreciated the presence of non-binary characters in the game, praising the writers for how they handled their gender. Anime Feminist writer Cy discussed Setsu as a representation of both genderqueer characters and asexual characters. They discussed how romance may occur between Setsu and the protagonist, but appreciated the depiction of a "passionate love and bond" that has no sex involved.
