= Yukinobu Hoshino =

Japanese manga artist (born 1954)

Yukinobu Hoshino 星野 之宣
- Born: January 29, 1954 (age 72) Kushiro, Hokkaidō, Japan
- Area: Manga artist
- Notable works: 2001 Nights, Munakata Kyouju Ikouroku

Yukinobu Hoshino (星野 之宣, Hoshino Yukinobu; born January 29, 1954) is a Japanese manga artist.

== Life ==
He was born in Kushiro, Hokkaidō and dropped out of Aichi Prefectural University of Fine Arts and Music after two years of studying mid-semester from the fine arts department. He moved to Tokyo in order to pursue a career as a professional manga artist. He made his professional debut in 1975 with Kotetsu no Queen. At the age of 21, he won the Tezuka Award for an outstanding manga of a newcomer artist for Harukanaru Asa and Osamu Tezuka, known as "the God of Manga" (マンガの神様, Manga no kamisama), highly praised it. He became known for his science fiction manga. An early success came in 1976, when he wrote Blue City for Weekly Shonen Jump. He won an Excellence Prize at the 2008 Japan Media Arts Festival for Munakata Kyouju Ikouroku.

He works from his home in Sapporo.

== Style ==
He liked Osamu Tezuka's and Jiro Kuwata's science fiction manga while growing up and watching 2001: A Space Odyssey while in junior high school was a transformative experience for him. Matazō Kayama was a painter he liked during his studies.

Initially, his artistic style was similar to that of Mikiya Mochizuki and had humoristic touches, but moved on to the gekiga style. He is known for using the gekiga style to create detailed and serious science fiction stories based on American and European SF novels but creating a completely different storyline. He had also drawn various works based on ancient and pre-historic histories. Amongst other things, he is known for his graphic novel series, 2001 Nights.

== Legacy ==
His work is acknowledged by the British Museum and was on display during November 5, 2009, to January 3, 2010.

== Works ==
=== Manga ===
- Kotetsu no Queen (鋼鉄のクイーン)
- Harukanaru Asa (はるかなる朝)
- Blue City (ブルーシティー)
- 2001 Nights (2001夜物語), 1984–1986
  - A collection of short stories that look to mankind's exploration of space, and examine the possibilities that we could face when we decide to take those first fateful steps into the unknown.
- Blue Hole (ブルー ホール), 1991–1992
- Blue World (ブルー・ワールド), 1995–1997
- Kyojintachi no Densetsu (巨人たちの伝説)
- Yamataika (ヤマタイカ)
- Munakata Kyoju Denkiko (宗像教授伝奇考)
- Saber Tiger
- Kodoku Experiment
- Star Dust Memories
- 2001+5
- Kamunabi
- El Alamein no Shinden (エル・アラメインの神殿)
  - A compilation of World War II short stories from the perspective of the German military personnel.
- Professor Munakata's British Museum Adventure
  - Follow up on the Museum's exhibition in 2009–2010, first published as a series of 10 episodes in Big Comic in 2010 and then as a book in 2011 by the British Museum Press.

=== Painting books ===
- STAR FIELD (1986, Futabasha)
- CHRONICLE (1996, Asahi Sonorama)
