= 2001 Nights =

Japanese manga series and its franchise

- Japanese manga cover of 2001 Nights volume 1

2001夜物語 (Nisen'ichi Ya Monogatari)
- Genre: Science fiction
- Manga
- Written by: Yukinobu Hoshino
- Published by: Futabasha
- English publisher: NA: Viz Media
- Magazine: Monthly Super Action
- Original run: June 1984 – June 1986
- Volumes: 3
- Original video animation

Space Fantasia 2001 Nights
- Directed by: Yoshio Takeuchi
- Produced by: Junichi Iioka; Tomoko Satō; Takahisa Yokomizo
- Written by: Chiho Katsura; Ken Echigoya
- Music by: Satoshi Kadokura
- Studio: Tokyo Movie Shinsha
- Released: July 1987
- Runtime: 60 minutes
- Original video animation

TO
- Directed by: Fumihiko Sori
- Produced by: Yoshito Takaya; Yumiko Yoshihara
- Written by: Fumihiko Sori
- Music by: Tetsuya Takahashi
- Studio: Oxybot
- Licensed by: NA: Funimation; UK: Manga Entertainment
- Released: November 2009
- Episodes: 2

2001 Nights (2001夜物語, Nisen'ichi Ya Monogatari) is a science fiction manga series written and illustrated by Yukinobu Hoshino and originally serialized in Futabasha's Monthly Super Action starting from June 1984. It was then collected into three bound volumes by Futabasha, released between August 18, 1985 and October 24, 1986. The series was licensed for an English-language release by Viz Media and published in North America starting in 1990. 2001 Nights is largely inspired by classic hard science fiction, with many visual homages to previous science fiction novels and films.

== Plot ==
Humanity's exploration of the cosmos, which began in the latter half of the 20th century, progressed through the milestones of human spaceflight and the launch of space stations, eventually leading to the discovery of traces of extraterrestrial life. Attempts at interstellar travel led to the "Human Seeding Project", a mission utilizing computer-controlled spacecraft loaded with frozen sperm and ova, designed to initiate fertilization and gestation the moment a planet suitable for life was identified.

In the early 21st century, a new object dubbed "Lucifer" was discovered far beyond the orbit of Neptune, eventually found to be an antimatter star. This celestial body became a colossal energy source, enabling instantaneous interstellar travel through a form of hyperspace navigation powered by artificial black holes. The descendants of the Robinsons, who were the couple who had provided the genetic material for the "Human Seeding Project", continued to participate in space endeavors across generations. Concurrently, a "New Generation" of humans began to emerge—individuals born and raised in space, boasting IQs and lifespans far exceeding those of traditional Earth-born humans.

By the 24th century, humanity had expanded its reach across a region of space spanning a 150-light-year radius, but still no extraterrestrial life had been found. Humanity decided to launch a final initiative to locate extraterrestrial life: the "Grand SETI Project." Around the time that Adam Robinson joined the project, the "children" of the Human Seeding Project finally arrived at a planet within the Tau Ceti star system. Around this same time, a group of the "New Generation", who called themselves "Tachyonians", were preparing to embark on a journey across the galaxy.

== Media ==
=== Manga ===
2001 Nights consists of several loosely connected short stories, all taking place in the same timeline, with the whole series spanning several hundred years. Many of the stories are related to each other (even across books), each building upon the achievements of the previous ones. The stories are often (but not always) scientifically plausible, recalling much of the early science fiction of the 1950s and 1960s.

=== Anime ===
==== 2001 Nights ====
2001 Nights was adapted into a one-episode original video animation (OVA) under the name Space Fantasia 2001 Nights by Tokyo Movie Shinsha and released on VHS on June 21, 1987.

==== TO ====
Two stories from 2001 Nights, Night 12 ("Symbiotic Planet") and Night 14 ("Elliptical Orbit") respectively, were adapted into TO, a two-episode computer animation (CGI) original video animation (OVA). Fumihiko Sori directed. It was released on DVD and Blu-ray by Avex in December 2009, in Japan. TO was released on rental DVDs on October 2, 2009, and in December 2009 as regular DVD and Blu-ray release. It was scheduled to air on TBS and BS-TBS (Japanese satellite TV broadcaster) in November and December 2009, prior to the DVD and Blu-ray release. A 10-minute trailer was released on YouTube by Avex on November 11, 2009. Manga Entertainment a UK distributor acquired licensing in late 2010. Funimation licensed To for North American release in 2011.

== Stories ==
The stories that make up the complete manga are placed in chronological order, with two exceptions. By the technology used, Night 14 ("Elliptical Orbit") seems to belong somewhere between Nights 6 and 7 (after the invention of suspended animation and interstellar travel, but before the discovery of Lucifer). The second, Night 6 ("Discovery") is referenced in Night 4 ("Posterity") which occurs 20 years after the launch of the probe Discovery.

=== Volume list ===
No.	Original release date	Original ISBN	English release date	English ISBN
1	August 18, 1985	4-575-93074-1	March 22, 1996	1-56931-056-4
01. "Night 1: Earthglow"; 02. "Night 2: Sea of Fertility"; 03. "Night 3: Maelstrom III"; 04. "Night 4: Posterity"; 05. "Night 5: Rendezvous"; 06. "Night 6: Discovery"; 07. "Night 7: Lucifer Rising"
2	December 28, 1985	4-575-93075-X	June 22, 1996	1-56931-102-1
08. "Night 8: The Lights of Heaven"; 09. "Night 9: Journey Beyond Tomorrow"; 10. "Night 10: Medusa's Throne"; 11. "Night 11: A Stranger's Footsteps"; 12. "Night 12: Symbiotic Planet"; 13. "Night 13: Final Evolution"; 14. "Night 14: Elliptical Orbit"
3	October 24, 1986	4-575-93076-8	February 22, 1996	1-56931-125-0
15. "Night 15: An Hour's Song in a Birdless Sky"; 16. "Night 16: Colony"; 17. "Night 17: So Brief. So Lasting a Love"; 18. "Night 18: Odyssey in Green"; 19. "Final Night: Children of the Earth"

== Reception ==
Reviewing the manga Mark Aragona praised Hoshino's skill in striking a balance between the scientific and the fantastical elements in his stories, noting the opus of Lucifer Rising. Harry Knowles of Ain't It Cool News praised the work for its portrayal, but overcomes its inspiration One Thousand and One Nights and 2001: A Space Odyssey, noting "It is reminiscent of the classics and develops its science fiction well enough on its own that is not diminished by comparisons."

Anime-focus.com reviewed the TO OVA and offered a mixed review of the work. While praising the graphics and special effects, it focused on the emotionless Funimation English dub which made all the worse by lifeless characters and the lack of attachment to the stories. Closing with, "This should have been a gem but the flaws are too great to make this the masterpiece it could have been." Charles Packer, found the same flaws in his review, "Whilst the disc may look eye watering spectacular, it's difficult to get over the fact that the stories rely too heavily on clichés."
