= Shizuoka Daiichi Television =

Shizuoka Daiichi Television Corporation
- Logo used since 2016
- Native name: 株式会社静岡第一テレビ
- Romanized name: Kabushikigaisha Shizuokadaiichiterebi
- Company type: Kabushiki gaisha
- Industry: Television broadcasting
- Founded: February 15, 1979; 47 years ago
- Headquarters: 563 Nakahara, Suruga-ku, Shizuoka City, Shizuoka Prefecture, Japan
- Key people: Kazuki Sakurada (Chairman and Representative Director); Koichi Akaza (President and Representative Director)
- Number of employees: 121 (2021)
- Website: www.tv-sdt.co.jp
- Footnotes / references Data from its Company Profile

JOSX-DTV
- Shizuoka Prefecture; Japan
- City: Shizuoka
- Channels: Digital: 19 (UHF); Virtual: 4
- Branding: Shizuoka Daiichi Television; Daiichi TV

Programming
- Affiliations: Nippon News Network and Nippon Television Network System

Ownership
- Owner: Shizuoka Daiichi Television Corporation

History
- First air date: July 1, 1979
- Former call signs: JOSX-TV (1979–2011)
- Former channel numbers: Analog: 31 (UHF; 1979–2011)

Technical information
- Licensing authority: MIC

Links
- Website: http://www.tv-sdt.co.jp/

Shizuoka Daiichi Television (静岡第一テレビ, SDT) is a TV station broadcasting in Shizuoka Prefecture. It is an affiliate of Nippon News Network and Nippon Television Network System.

== Programs ==
- Marugoto (16:53-17:53[JST])
