= Monthly Halloween =

Japanese manga magazine

- Cover of Monthly Halloween issue 1
- Categories: Horror, shōjo manga
- Frequency: Monthly
- First issue: December 13, 1985; 40 years ago
- Final issue: December 1995
- Company: Asahi Sonorama
- Country: Japan
- Language: Japanese

Monthly Halloween (Japanese: 月刊ハロウィン, Hepburn: Gekkan Halloween) was a Japanese manga magazine published by Asahi Sonorama from 1985 to 1995. The magazine focused on horror shōjo manga (girls' comics), and was the first magazine of its kind in this category. In the 1990s, the magazine launched two sister publications: Nemuki and Honkowa, both of which continued publication after Monthly Halloween folded in 1995.

== History ==
The publishing company Asahi Sonorama began producing magazines publishing shōnen manga (boys' comics) in the early 1980s, such as Gekkan Manga Shōnen and DUO, but found the shōnen market too competitive and pivoted to shōjo manga. During the 1980s, horror films were especially popular in Japan among teenaged girls, while Halloween had recently been introduced in the country as a holiday. In response to these trends, Asahi Sonorama decided to create a shōjo manga magazine dedicated to horror manga, using the holiday as the name for the publication.

Editors at the company contacted Kazuo Umezu, a popular horror manga artist who had previously published works with the company, to participate in the launch of the magazine. The first issue of Monthly Halloween was published on Friday, December 13, 1985 (cover dated as January 1986) as a reference to the Friday the 13th franchise.

Monthly Halloween was the first shōjo magazine dedicated to the horror genre. Its success led to a wave of shōjo horror imitators at other publishing companies, such as Suspiria and Mystery Bonita at Akita Shoten, which were oriented towards suspense manga; and Horror M at Bunkasha, which was oriented towards gory and violent stories. Buoyed by this success, Asahi Sonorama launched two special issues of Monthly Halloween in the early 1990s, Nekumi and Honkowa, which were later spun off into independent publications.

Following its launch, the magazine established the Kazuo Umezu Prize, chaired by Umezu himself, in order to identify and recruit new talent. Junji Ito won the prize in 1986 with the first chapter of his manga series Tomie; the magazine began publishing the series in 1987, and Itō quickly became the magazine's star artist.

The horror genre declined in popularity by the mid-1990s, and the macabre and horrifying elements of the magazine were increasingly diluted into other genres, such as comedy. Asahi Sonorama eventually discontinued Monthly Halloween and replaced it with Nemuki, with the last issue of Monthly Halloween published in December 1995.

== Sister publications ==
=== Nemuki ===
Nemurenu Yoru no Kimyō Na Hanashi (眠れぬ夜の奇妙な話; lit. "Strange Stories of Sleepless Nights"), most commonly known by its abbreviation Nemuki (ネムキ), is a bimonthly magazine that began as a special issue of Monthly Halloween in 1990. It publishes fantasy manga in addition to horror, with stories that aim to be "more ambitious, sensitive and mature" than those of Monthly Halloween. Artists Ichiko Ima, Daijiro Morohoshi and Akiko Hatsu are some of the most important contributors to the magazine. In 2013, following a restructuring at Asahi, the magazine changed its name to Nemuki+.

=== Honkowa ===
Honto Ni Atta Kowai Hanashi (ほんとにあった怖い話; lit. "Scary Stories That Really Happened"), most commonly known by its abbreviation Honkowa (ほん怖), is a bimonthly magazine that began as a special issue of Monthly Halloween in 1991. It publishes horror stories that purport to be based on true events.

The magazine was founded after a manga published in Monthly Halloween by artist Takakazu Nagakubo about a "true" encounter with a ghost resulted in a large number of readers writing in to the magazine about their own supernatural experiences. This prompted Asahi Sonorama to publish a special issue of the magazine dedicated to stories inspired by true events, which was successful enough to be spun off into its own publication. Honto Ni Atta Kowai Hanashi, a television program adapting stories from the magazine, has aired on Fuji Television since 1999.

== Serializations ==
The following is a partial list of titles published in Monthly Halloween, Nemuki, and Honkowa.

- Flesh-Colored Horror by Junji Ito (Note: Anthology collecting multiple works published in Monthly Halloween and Nemuki.)
- Fragments of Horror by Junji Ito
- Hyakkiyakō Shō by Ichiko Ima
- Karura Mau by Takakazu Nagakubo
- Kinginka by Yuko Kishi
- London Demon Street by JET
- Tomie by Junji Ito
- Zangekikan by Ochazukenori
