= Gnosia =

2019 video game

- Game icon featuring the character SQ
- Developer: Petit Depotto
- Publishers: JP: Mebius (Vita); JP: Petit Depotto (NS); WW: Playism
- Artist: Kotori
- Writer: Shigoto
- Composer: Q flavor
- Platforms: PlayStation Vita: Nintendo Switch; Windows; PlayStation 4; PlayStation 5; Xbox One; Xbox Series X/S
- Release: June 20, 2019: PlayStation Vita; JP: June 20, 2019; Nintendo Switch; JP: December 17, 2020; WW: March 4, 2021; Windows; WW: January 23, 2022; PS4, PS5, XBO, XSX/S; WW: December 14, 2023
- Genres: Visual novel, role-playing, social deduction
- Mode: Single-player

Gnosia (Note: Japanese: グノーシア, Hepburn: Gunōshia) is a 2019 visual novel and social deduction game developed by Petit Depotto. It was originally released in June 2019 for the PlayStation Vita, and was ported to the Nintendo Switch in December 2020, with a Windows version released in January 2022. It also released for PlayStation 4, PlayStation 5, Xbox One and Xbox Series X/S in December 2023.

The game's setting takes place on a spaceship in an era where space exploration is at odds with a deadly parasitic disease called gnosia, which seeks to rid humanity by possessing its host. The player takes control of an amnesiac who either chooses to investigate potentially infected crewmates or become one of the infected. At the same time, the player also tries to end a time loop by harnessing the "silver key" inside of them to acquire enough knowledge needed to end it.

An anime television series adaptation produced by Domerica aired from October 2025 to March 2026.

== Gameplay ==
Tutorial screenshot with the game's interface.

This game uses a visual novel role-playing game format mixed with an RNG social deduction game. It is single player and utilizes a timeloop structure to create new situations. Aboard a spaceship, the player and several NPCs must deduce who on board is a Gnosia, an alien-like creature that will kill the regular humans on board. The player works with the NPCs to suss out and nominate the potential Gnosia suspects and put them into cryo-sleep. The player can also be Gnosia, in which case they know the other Gnosia on board and will work together to try to eliminate the humans. The number of Gnosia as well as the number of NPCs on board as well as the player's role, is determined prior to each loop beginning. In addition to regular humans and Gnosia, there are other roles, including the Doctor (who can investigate the recently frozen NPCs and determine if they were human or not), the Engineer (who can investigate non-frozen characters to determine if they are human), the Guardian Angel (who can protect high-risk targets from elimination by the Gnosia), Guard Duty (who are two guaranteed humans who can vouch for each other), Anti-Cosmic Follower (also referred to as AC Follower; who is a human that sides with the Gnosia), and the Bug (who is essentially playing for themselves, trying to stay alive to the end of the round and seizing victory for themselves, destroying the universe).

Throughout playing these loops the player will encounter many events with the other characters, which provides additional backstory to them as well as the universe they are in. In order to get to the ending of the game, the player must encounter all of these events first, many of which are locked behind a specific set of parameters for each loop. The game allows for an "event search" function on the ruleset screen, which lets you make it more likely to run into the events triggering.

== Plot ==
Gnosia is set in the far future, where humanity has become a massive spacefaring civilization, dealing with a threat called Gnosia, an infestation that compels people to murder other people in the name of their god, Gnos. The player character manages to get a ride on a refugee ship escaping from a planet being ravaged by the Gnosia. However, during the trip to another planet, the ship's computer LeVi detects Gnosia infection on board the ship and following protocol, instructs the passengers and crew to deduce which one of them is the Gnosia and put them into cold sleep. If they fail to do so, the ship is forced to self-destruct. However, the player quickly discovers that regardless of the outcome of the investigation, time loops back to the initial discovery of the Gnosia infection. The player also discovers one of the passengers, Setsu, has also been trapped in a series of time loops, and they both agree to collaborate to figure out how to escape their loops. However, when time loops, the conditions are not always identical; the number of humans and Gnosia can change, as well as the identity of the Gnosia. The player even gains the ability to manually adjust the settings for each loop as they play through numerous different scenarios.

The cast consists of 15 different characters, with the initial loop involving the player, Setsu, Raqio, SQ, and Gina. Other characters join in future loops, including Stella, Shigemichi, Yuriko, Comet, Chipie, Jonas, Kukrushka, Otome, Sha-Ming, and Remnan. The player learns from the shrine maiden Yuriko that Gnos is actually a collective hivemind of "cyberised" humans who uploaded their minds to an electronic database and use the Gnosia as a means to add more minds to their collective. Yuriko also points out that the player themself is an anomaly, since the ship only finds out the Gnosia infection since the player is supposed to be the Gnosia's first victim, meaning the player has been looping to timelines where they have already died. Raqio also eventually reveals that the player and Setsu's time loops are caused by an entity called the "Silver Key", which attach themselves to humans and gather data through the time loops they experience. Once the Silver Key collects enough information, it leaves to a different universe to continue its life cycle.

After enough loops and unique scenarios, the player will finally gather enough data to fill up their Silver Key, looping to a timeline where nobody on the ship was infected by the Gnosia. The player's Silver Key then opens a portal, and in order to prevent a time paradox, Setsu decides to take that loop's still hibernating version of the player character through the portal, with Setsu staying in the loop because their Silver Key has not been filled yet. The player is forced to part ways with Setsu and returns to the rest of the passengers and crew, who celebrate having escaped the Gnosia Plague but have completely forgotten Setsu's existence.

In the game's true ending, the player decides to follow Setsu to the other universe by starting a new game file. Setsu is shocked, but welcomes the player's help, as Setsu's Silver Key has now filled up thanks to the player's arrival, meaning Setsu's time loop can be closed now as well. Setsu uses knowledge gained from other time loops to discover the identity of the Gnosia, Manan, who is in SQ's body and is only conscious when SQ is the Gnosia. Wanting to avoid putting anyone in cold sleep or having anyone die, they take advantage of Manan's desire for immortality by tempting her with the Silver Key, which she could use to loop forever. They give her access to a robot body known to be Kukrushka by the player and Setsu, and have her take the Silver Key through the portal into another universe. Having broken free from their respective time loops, the player and Setsu finally take a moment to relax together without having to worry about the future.

== Development ==
Gnosia's development first began in 2015 by four-person indie studio Petit Depotto, being their second video game released after Unholy Heights. Unholy Heights originally released in Japan on the Xbox 360 in 2012. The Gnosia team was led by game designer Toru Kawakatsu, who goes by the pseudonym Mezukare. They were inspired to make the game after playing a werewolf-style game and finding the construction of the experience lacking, which lead to them planning to make their own version they would enjoy. Development of this project began in 2015 on PlayStation Mobile, though it was initially not planned to be released. It was eventually announced for a PlayStation Vita release in 2017, and was ultimately published by Mebius in Japan on June 20, 2019, shortly after the platform was discontinued. The music was composed early into development, without the context of the gameplay, cast, or story to develop it.

Unlike typical werewolf games, which are multiplayer, Gnosia was always designed to be a single-player narrative-driven social deduction game. Mezukare noted that the kind of game they were making was unusual, so they had to take it "one step at a time" while writing the story, with the process taking a long time to do. The team received advice from Amphibian, the designer behind a similar game called Raging Loop, which helped the process along. The loops were designed in order to last anywhere from 5–15 minutes in length. The first 15 loops of the game were intended to serve as the game's tutorial. In this part, the discussions were simpler, and characters and roles were introduced gradually. Despite being exclusive to a discontinued platform and having an initially slow week, Japanese critics enjoyed the game. This, in conjunction with them being an unknown developer and it having little competition, lead to increased attention and sales. The sudden support was a happy thing for the team, with Mezukare stating that it gave the team confidence.

It was designed as a Vita experience, with the logic of being on the Vita being that it would have been "buried" on other platforms by the competition. This logic was the same for why Unholy Heights released on the Xbox 360 despite being unpopular in Japan and late in its life, adding that having a small userbase typically leads to better reviews and the ability to target would-be fans more directly. By comparison, he noted, a bigger platform may lead to people who are not their target reviewing their games negatively. The popularity of Gnosia led to people requesting they release a Nintendo Switch port of the game. They were not considering a port at first, though they were swayed when they noticed a number of commenters saying that the Vita was "dead." They were also recognized by Nintendo, and given a 70-second spot on a Nintendo Direct presentation advertising Gnosia for the Nintendo Switch. Hideki Yasuda, an Ace Research Institute analyst, believed that it would not have gotten this attention if it launched on Vita and Switch at the same time.

Petit Depotto self-published the game for the Switch on December 17, 2020. It was released internationally on the Switch on March 4, 2021, published by Playism. A Windows version was released on January 23, 2022, in English, Japanese, and Chinese, following a delay from 2021. A port to PlayStation 4, PlayStation 5, Xbox One and Xbox Series X/S was released worldwide by Playism on December 14, 2023.

== Reception ==
Reception

Aggregate score
Aggregator	Score
Metacritic	82/100

Review scores
Publication	Score
Destructoid	7/10
Electronic Gaming Monthly	4/5
Famitsu	10/10, 10/10, 9/10, 7/10
GameSpot	8/10
IGN	10/10
Nintendo Life	8/10
Nintendo World Report	8/10

Gnosia received generally positive reviews from video game critics. Katsuhiko Hayashi, head of the Famitsu Dengeki Game Awards committee, awarded Gnosia due to the "level of satisfaction we heard from players [being] extremely high." In 2022's Famitsu Dengeki Game Awards, Gnosia was voted number one in every category, including best indie game, most unique indie game, best indie game music, best indie game scenario, and best indie game character. The latter category was won by Setsu, though the second, third, and fourth placements were held by Raqio, Sha-Ming, and SQ, respectively. It received a score of 82 on MetaCritic based on 39 reviews, ranging from a perfect 100 from Digitally Downloaded to a 40 from Switch Brasil. Mollie Patterson of Electronic Gaming Monthly praised the game's single-player adaptation of a typically multiplayer affair, stating: "arguing against the computer in an attempt to determine who is the human-killing alien in your group is far more dynamic and exciting than you’d ever expect this type of game to be." Nintendo Life's Trent Cannon found joy in the "clever, varied game design," deeming it perfect for both short or long gaming sessions.

Heidi Kemps of GameSpot offered both compliments and criticisms, lauding Gnosia's "intriguing story that slowly reveals its truths, keeping you interested in coming back for more," while lamenting the lack of character dialogue during discussions. Heather Johnson Yu of HeyPoorPlayer echoed Kemps' sentiments, both negative and positive, with a glowing addition that Gnosia was "my contender for GOTY 2021." The limited dialogue options were a dealbreaker for Igor Rangel of Switch Brasil, who considered the immersion "shallow" and suggested voice acting to offset the response issues.

== Anime adaptation ==
- Gnosia
- Created by: Petit Depotto
- Anime television series
- Directed by: Kazuya Ichikawa
- Written by: Jukki Hanada
- Music by: Hideyuki Fukasawa
- Studio: Domerica
- Licensed by: NA: Aniplex of America
- Original network: Tokyo MX, GYT, GTV, BS11, TVA, MBS, AT-X
- Original run: October 12, 2025 – March 15, 2026
- Episodes: 21
- icon

An anime television series adaptation was announced on December 1, 2024. It is produced by Domerica and directed by Kazuya Ichikawa, with Jukki Hanada handling series composition, Arisa Matsuura designing the characters based on Kotori's original character designs, and Hideyuki Fukasawa composing the music. The series aired for 21 episodes from October 12, 2025, (Note: Tokyo MX and BS11 listed the series premiere on October 11 at 24:00, which is effectively October 12 at midnight JST.) to March 15, 2026 on Tokyo MX and other networks. The opening theme song is "Bake no Kawa" (化けの皮, Bake no Kawa), performed by Maisondes featuring Kobo Kanaeru, Kasane Teto, Giga & TeddyLoid, while the first ending theme song (from Episodes 2 to 7) is "Loo% Who%", performed by Ling Tosite Sigure, and the second ending theme song (from Episode 8 onwards) is "Floor Killer", performed by Umeda Cypher. Aniplex of America licensed the series for streaming on Crunchyroll.

=== Episodes ===
No.	Title	Directed by	Storyboarded by	Original release date
1	"Starting Point"; Transliteration: "Shiten" (Japanese: 始点)	Arisa Matsuura	Yūki Ōnishi	October 12, 2025
Yuri is woken up from a medical pod suffering from amnesia, and finds out that they are on the space cruiser DQO, which has recently escaped the planet of Liu-An, which has been destroyed by the Gnosia, people infected with a virus that compels them to kill humans. One of the other passengers, Setsu, explains that the ship's AI LeVi has detected a Gnosia on board, and the passengers must determine which of them is the Gnosia and put them into cold sleep, otherwise the ship will self-destruct. However, if the Gnosia isn't put into cold sleep, they will attack and kill a passenger while the ship makes a warp jump, until the number of Gnosia equals the number of humans where they then will immediately kill the remaining humans. Setsu introduces Yuri to the other passengers: Racio, SQ, and Jina, and they undergo their first round of voting. Racio is voted to be put into cold sleep, but the Gnosia remains on the ship. After the next warp jump, Jina ends up being killed by the Gnosia. Unsure of who the Gnosia is, Yuri decides to vote Setsu, since they have the feeling Setsu has been hiding a secret from them. Before being put into cold sleep, Setsu gifts Yuri a strange disc that is absorbed into their body. With Setsu in cold sleep, SQ reveals she is the Gnosia and she immediately attacks and kills Yuri. Yuri then suddenly wakes up, and finds that they have looped back to the moment they awakened in the medical pod.
2	"Loops"; Transliteration: "Rūpu" (Japanese: ループ)	Arisa Matsuura	Yūki Ōnishi	October 19, 2025
Yuri wakes up and tries to explain they are in a time loop to Setsu, who doesn't understand what Yuri is saying. At the first meeting, Racio once again tries to accuse Yuri of being the Gnosia while Yuri tries to accuse SQ. However, suspicion falls upon Setsu instead when they claim they are Yuri's lover, resulting in Setsu being voted to be put into cold sleep. Before being sealed away, Setsu warns Yuri not to draw attention to themselves during meetings and not to trust anybody. Afterwards, Jina tries to form a rapport with Yuri by taking them on a spacewalk and later a tour of the ship where she explains she is a space traffic controller from Earth. They then approach Racio to ask them to vote SQ if either Yuri or Jina are eliminated and Yuri admits they are in a time loop. Racio believes Yuri's story about a time loop since it's scientifically possible, but warns that alternate timelines are not identical, meaning SQ might not be the Gnosia in this loop. The next day, Racio is eliminated, and both Yuri and Jina vote SQ to be put into cold sleep. However, it's revealed that Jina is actually the Gnosia this time, and Yuri is killed once again. Yuri then wakes up in their third loop, and is shocked to discover there are two new passengers on the ship.
3	"New Crew Members"; Transliteration: "Aratana Jōin" (Japanese: 新たな乗員)	Akane Shimizu	Akane Shimizu	October 26, 2025
The two new crew members introduce themselves as Shigemichi and Stella, and Yuri comes to the conclusion that the loops will not only change the identity of the Gnosia, but also have different numbers of crew. In the first meeting, Yuri is shocked to learn that with the crew size being larger, there are now two Gnosia hiding among them instead of one. Once again Racio tries to accuse Yuri while Setsu and Stella come to their defense. Racio's attempt to steer the vote instead puts themself in the crosshairs and Racio is voted to be put into cold sleep. Afterwards, Yuri meets Shigemichi in the mess hall, and learns that Shigemichi's body is covered in artificial skin due to an accident, which makes him resemble an alien. Shigemichi also has a crush on Stella, and is jealous of Yuri since Yuri apparently rescued Stella during their escape from Liu-An. On Day 2, Setsu is eliminated. Remembering an odd sensation they had about Jina when she lied in the previous loop, Yuri has the crew claim they're human, and feels the same sensation from Jina. However, Yuri doesn't have enough evidence to properly accuse her. Shigemichi is voted to be put into cold sleep, and both Jina and Stella reveal they are the Gnosia before killing Yuri and SQ. In the fourth loop, Yuri discovers they have been assigned the Engineer role, who has the ability to identify if a crew member is a Gnosia during a warp jump. In the first meeting, Racio claims to be the Engineer and accuses Yuri, forcing Yuri to counterclaim. As before, Racio's attempts to steer the conversation gets themself voted out. On the second day, Jina is eliminated. Yuri deduces that Shigemichi is the second Gnosia, and he prioritized eliminating Jina rather than Yuri since Jina voted against him. Shigemichi is put into cold sleep and LeVi confirms the Gnosia threat is over. Despite the victory, Yuri finds themselves at the beginning of a new loop anyways, and encounters yet another new crew member.
4	"Silver Key"; Transliteration: "Gin no Kagi" (Japanese: 銀の鍵)	Yuki Iida	Yūki Ōnishi	November 2, 2025
The new crew member is revealed to be a traveling shrine maiden named Yuriko, who has replaced Jina in the current loop. During the first meeting, Yuriko accuses Shigemichi of being the Gnosia, which is enough to get him unanimously voted to be put into cold sleep. Suspicious about Yuriko's true nature, Yuri tries to dig up any information about her. Yuriko then privately meets with Yuri and warns that eventually, Yuri will come to realize their own "distortion". However, during the warp jump, Racio is revealed to be the Gnosia and kills Yuri, causing them to loop again. In that loop, Yuri learns that the current Setsu is aware of the loops. Setsu explains they both have a "Silver Key", which are parasitic lifeforms that crave human knowledge, and will force their hosts through time loops to collect that information until they are filled, in which they will leave for a different dimension to find a new host. Since Yuri got their Silver Key at a different time than Setsu, they will likely meet each other in different loops at different points of time, especially since this Setsu has not given a Silver Key to Yuri yet. Setsu then admits to Yuri they are the Gnosia, which Stella overhears. During the meeting, Stella accuses Setsu of being the Gnosia, but Yuri lies and covers for Setsu, causing Stella to be put into cold sleep instead. Later, Setsu admits they revealed their identity as a Gnosia to Yuri to judge Yuri's reaction. Satisfied at hearing Setsu's answer, Yuri quests that Setsu eliminate them next as penance for betraying Stella. In the next loop, Yuri discovers that two new crew members have boarded the ship.
5	"Wild Intuition"; Transliteration: "Yasei no Kan" (Japanese: 野生の勘)	Arisa Matsuura	Hiroki Fujii & Mami Kikuchi	November 9, 2025
The two new crew members introduce themselves as Chipie and Comet. In the first meeting, both Yuriko and Stella claim they are the engineer. Racio advises that nobody vote for either Yuriko or Stella, since they risk eliminating the real engineer. In addition, if the real engineer is killed by the Gnosia, it will confirm the remaining engineer is a Gnosia. In the end, Jina is voted to be put into cold sleep due to her silence making her suspicious. Afterwards, Yuri spends some time with Chipie and Comet, and finds out that Chipie is undergoing a procedure to turn himself into a cat due to his love for the animals, while Comet hosts a symbiotic slime mold in her body and ran away from her home planet to become a ship captain. On the second day, Racio ends up being eliminated. Setsu reveals they are the Doctor, who can check if someone in cold sleep is a Gnosia, and confirms Jina is human. Stella accuses Chipie of being a Gnosia while Yuriko confirms Setsu is human. Yuri deduces that Yuriko is lying, since she chose the safe option of confirming Setsu is human, while Stella took the risk of accusing Chipie, thus making him her enemy in the upcoming vote. The crew votes Yuriko to be put into cold sleep, and Chipie admits defeat, voluntarily putting himself into cold sleep as well. Yuri is then sent to the next loop, where they encounter two more new crew members.
6	"Nostalgic Flowers"; Transliteration: "Natsukashī Kimi ni Kakan o" (Japanese: 懐かしい君に花冠を)	Kanako Yajima	Kanako Yajima	November 16, 2025
The two new crew members introduce themselves as the ship's captain Jonas and the mute girl Kukrushka. In the meeting, there are now twelve crew members with three Gnosia among them. In addition, it's revealed that on top the Engineer and Doctor roles being present, there is a new Guardian Angel role that can protect one crew member from Gnosia attack every warp, and Yuri happens to be the Guardian Angel. Kukrushka and Comet both claim to be the Engineer while Shigemichi and Yuriko claim to be the Doctor. Since everybody is at an impasse, Stella volunteers to be put into cold sleep first. Shortly before the warp, LeVi explains to Yuri that Jonas was once a famous space explorer, but is now considered insane by the government. Yuri then tries to decide who to protect and ultimately picks Kukrushka. The next day, nobody is killed by the Gnosia, confirming Kukrushka is the real Engineer. Both Yuriko and Shigemichi confirm Stella is human, while Kukrushka confirms Yuriko is human and Comet accuses Yuri of being a Gnosia. Yuri manages to stay calm and calls for everybody either vote for them or Comet. Comet loses her nerve and tries to insist she's the real Engineer, which draws enough suspicion to her that she is voted to be put in cold sleep. Shortly before the warp, Yuri meets Kukrushka and tells her that they are the Guardian Angel, unaware that Racio is spying on them. The next day, Setsu is eliminated and Racio successfully outsmarts Yuri by claiming to be the Guardian Angel and showing evidence of Yuri's secret meeting with Kukrushka, convincing the crew Yuri is a Gnosia. Yuri is put into cold sleep and is sent to the next loop, where they encounter a new crew member.
7	"Understand?"; Transliteration: "Andasutān?" (Japanese: アンダスタァン？)	Yuki Iida	Yūki Ōnishi	November 23, 2025
The new crew member introduces herself as Otome, an uplifted dolphin with human level intelligence. Upon arriving at the meeting, Yuri learns about two more new crew members: the shy Remnan and arrogant Sha-ming. However, Sha-ming has barricaded himself in his room and refuses to leave, and while the crew considers voting him to be frozen, LeVi reminds everyone that if a day goes by without someone getting put in cold sleep, LeVi will self destruct the ship. As Stella goes to retrieve the key to override the door to Sha-ming's room, Shigemichi confides to the others he developed a crush on Stella due to her not judging him by the look of his artificial skin, and Otome encourages him to admit his feelings to her. The situation ends up with Shigemichi challenging Jonas to a board game to force him to free Stella. Shigemichi loses the match, but Jonas lets slip that he is Gnosia and subsequently voted to be put in cold sleep. Stella later confides to Yuri and Setsu that she's actually an android that acts as an extension of LeVi, so she feels she can't reciprocate Shigemichi's feelings. Both Yuri and Setsu assure her she's just as human as the rest of the crew, with Yuri admitting that Stella was a Gnosia in an earlier loop, encouraging her to start a friendship with Shigemichi. The next day, Jina is eliminated, and the crew once again tries to get Sha-ming to leave his room. Due to a combination of having a soft spot for Otome and being intimidated by Setsu's threats, Sha-ming voluntarily leaves his rooms and admits he's a Gnosia, leaving Otome to believe Sha-ming is actually a good person deep down.
8	"Guard Duty"; Transliteration: "Rusuban" (Japanese: 留守番)	Kumi Sato & Akane Shimizu	Raika Haino & Ryosuke Terada	November 30, 2025
In the next loop the hunt for the Gnosia comes down to a stalemate. In addition, both Kukrushka and Remnan are revealed to have been on Guard Duty, meaning they never set foot on Liu-An and therefore are confirmed to be human. Kukrushka accuses Sha-ming of being a Gnosia on a gut feeling, and he is subsequently voted to be put into cold sleep. However, Sha-ming grovels to the rest of the crew, causing them to rescind their votes out of pity for him. Later, Remnan approaches Yuri and confides how even though Kukrushka is human, he instinctively fears her due to the strange amount of attention she pays to him. When accepting a flower crown from Kukrushka, Remnan suddenly has a panic attack when he is reminded of a past trauma. Yuriko then cryptically warns Yuri that Kukrushka is neither Gnosia nor human. The next day, Yuriko is eliminated by the Gnosia, and Racio suggests putting Chipie, the last remaining Engineer, into cold sleep as a precaution in case he is a Gnosia. Chipie protests and requests to be given an exception like Sha-ming, until Kukrushka suggests everybody except her and Remnan be put into cold sleep, since that would be sure to remove the Gnosia threat. Everybody agrees to the plan and goes into cold sleep, only for Remnan to awaken Yuri later. Yuri is horrified to learn that Kukrushka has inexplicably murdered the rest of the crew. Remnan admits that he used to be enslaved to a woman similar to Kukrushka before they are cornered by her and Yuri is killed. In the next loop, Yuri is awakened by Comet, who tells them they are both Gnosia.
9	"World Of Gnosia"; Transliteration: "Gunōshia no Sekai" (Japanese: グノーシアの世界)	Kanako Yajima	Yūki Ōnishi	December 7, 2025
Comet informs Yuri that besides the two of them, Sha-ming is also a Gnosia, and they plan to have Comet claim to be the Engineer. Yuri is reluctant to play the part of a Gnosia, but recalls Setsu's advice that the best way to fill the Silver Key is to play their roles. SQ reveals herself as the Engineer while Comet counterclaims. Neither the Doctor or Guardian Angel reveal themselves, and with nobody on Guard Duty, Setsu pressures the crew to claim they are human to spot any liars. Yuri successfully covers for Comet when she falters, and Jina ends up being put in cold sleep. During the warp, Sha-ming recommends that they eliminate Otome first, as he considers it a mercy killing since he believes her lab will dispose of her once she's no longer useful. The trio eliminate Otome, who disintegrates, and Comet confides to Yuri that even though she's a Gnosia, she still has a desire to survive to fulfill her dream of becoming a ship captain. At the next meeting, Setsu comes forward as the Doctor while Sha-ming counterclaims and reports Otome was a Gnosia. SQ then reports Setsu is human, and Comet panics and confirms Setsu is human as well, which confirms Sha-ming is a Gnosia and gets him put in cold sleep. After eliminating Shigemichi, Comet is concerned her mistake will get them exposed, but Yuri comes up with a ploy to turn Comet's mistake into an excuse to accuse SQ of being a Gnosia instead. Afterwards, Yuri and Comet easily eliminate the remaining humans and seize the ship. Before the timeline loops, Comet admits to Yuri that she loves them.
10	"Citizen Slime"; Transliteration: "Kokumin Nenkin" (Japanese: 国民粘菌)	Asuka Fukada	Yūki Ōnishi	December 14, 2025
Yuri wakes up in the next loop and is shocked to find herself in a female body. Besides Yuri's change in gender, the loop continues as normal. Racio and Shigemichi are confirmed to be on Guard Duty, but with Sha-ming refusing to attend the meeting, everybody decides to postpone voting for one hour. Yuri decides to consult with Racio about her gender change, and briefly witnesses SQ bullying Remnan. Yuri tells Racio about the loops and her gender change, and Racio, being nonbinary, chastises Yuri on her concern over gender. Racio also points out that the Silver Key most likely changed Yuri's gender in its need to collect information, so there is likely a reason it needed Yuri to be a woman in this particular world line. Yuri tries to glean information from Jonas about Kukrushka, but she isn't part of the crew in this world line. Jonas wonders how Yuri could know about Kukrushka and asks her if she entered the storage area before leaving. Yuri then volunteers to help get Sha-ming out of his room, and uses her past knowledge to deduce Sha-ming is a Gnosia in this loop and under certain conditions, will try and force the crew to put him into cold sleep so he won't have to kill them. Suddenly, the ship is attacked by Come's slime mold which had gone rogue after Comet was accidentally put into cold sleep for a short time, and devoured most of the crew. Yuri and Sha-ming flee to storage, where they find Setsu uncovering Kukrushka's body which is actually an android. The slime mold attacks Setsu and Stella guides Yuri and Sha-ming to the infirmary and instructs them to enter the medical pod so she can vent the ship's air to kill the slime mold. Inside the pod, Sha-ming reveals he's sympathetic to uplifted animals like Otome because he had befriended uplifted bonobos when he was young, only for them to be destroyed and causing his pessimistic view of life. Yuri insists there's a world line he can be happy before they are put into hibernation. Some time later, they are woken up by Stella and Jonas, who managed to kill the slime mold by increasing the ship's internal temperature. Sha-ming, angry at the ridiculous outcome, insists he be put in cold sleep while Yuri muses that there must be a world line out there where everybody can be happy.
11	"511"	Yuki Iida	Ryunosuke Okawa & Natsuka Akagi	December 21, 2025
Yuri awakens in the next loop back in their original body, and finds out they were on Guard Duty along with SQ. During the meeting, Shigemichi and Remnan both claim they are the Engineer. Kukrushka ends up being put into cold sleep first, so Yuri decides to learn more about SQ instead. Yuri confides to her about the time loops, and she reveals that she's actually the 511th clone of her "mother" Manan, meant as a spare body for her to transfer her consciousness into to maintain her youth. However, something went wrong with the transfer process, and SQ developed a will of her own, partially overwriting Manan's. SQ muses that Yuri may have encountered world lines where Mana's consciousness was successfully transferred, and Yuri deduces that Manan was Remnan's former owner. After the first warp, Jonas is eliminated and Setsu comes forward as the Doctor, reporting Kukrushka is a Gnosia. With nobody contesting Setsu's claim, everybody realizes it is likely the fake engineer is the last remaining Gnosia. Yuri deduces that it is Shigemichi based on everybody's voting records, and turns out to be correct when he is put into cold sleep. Yuri then meets SQ afterwards and reassures her that she is not simply a spare body for Manan and that she is human like everybody else. SQ warns Yuri not to trust her in other loops because she might be Manan, and then admits she loves Yuri right before they loop.
12	"Allacosia"; Transliteration: "Arakoshia" (Japanese: アラコシア)	Arisa Matsuura	Yūki Ōnishi	December 28, 2025
Yuri is woken up in the next loop by Jina, and she is confused at strange statements Yuri makes that indicates they know more than they should. At the meeting, it is revealed there is an Engineer in the crew, but nobody comes forward and Yuriko ends up being vote into cold sleep. During the break period, Yuri privately meets with Jina and reveals the nature of the time loops to her. Jina confides to Yuri that she hates lying and being lied to, and admits that she's a Gnosia, begging Yuri to put her into cold sleep so she won't have to lie to the crew about being human anymore. However, Yuri refuses, still wanting to help Jina as a person. Jina later reveals she doesn't like the way Gnosia eliminate people, which is similar to how humans like her mother undergo "cyberization" by digitizing their minds under the watch of priestesses like Yuriko. During the warp, Jina and Otome decide to eliminate Racio. In the next meeting, Chipie comes forward as the Engineer while Otome counterclaims and accuse each other of being Gnosia. Jina then surprises everyone when she claims to be the Engineer as well and accuses Chipie of being a Gnosia. The crew deduces that a Gnosia will never accuse their own, so both Jina and Otome are voted to be put into cold sleep. However, after Otome is put to sleep, a magnetic anomaly disables the ship's shields. Jina takes it upon herself to don a spacesuit and repair the damage, and then pushes herself off into space so she won't pose a threat to the crew anymore. Yuri attempts to rescue her, but Jina simply pushes them back to the ship, admitting she's fallen in love with Yuri before suffocating when her suit's oxygen runs out.
13	"Interlude"; Transliteration: "Intārūdo" (Japanese: インタールード)	Kanako Yajima	Yūki Ōnishi	January 11, 2026
Yuri awakens in the next loop and begins to have doubts they can find a happy ending for everybody when Setsu suddenly collapses. When Setsu awakens, Yuri explains that they collapsed due to exhaustion, and the crew agreed to delay the meeting for one day. Setsu reveals to Yuri that during the previous loops, they have deduced that Kukrushka is hiding some sort of secret, given that she keeps appearing in loops and only goes berserk if she is in the same loop as Remnan. Yuri then takes the opportunity to have Setsu relax for the day and they perform various recreational activities. However, Setsu deduces that Yuri bought them a day by promising the crew that both of them would go into cold sleep. Regardless, Setsu it thankful for Yuri's compassion. Over the next few loops, Yuri focuses on investigating Kukrushka, and realizing that Kukrushka only seems to appear in the same loops Yuriko is present, comes to the conclusion that Yuriko cyberized Manan's consciousness and transplanted it into Kukrushka's body. Yuri confronts Yuriko about it, but she claims she doesn't have anything to do with Kukrushka. However, she does reveal there is a connection to the loops and is willing to tell Yuri "the truth".
14	"15-Person Meeting"; Transliteration: "15-Ri no Kaigi" (Japanese: 15人の会議)	Asuka Fukada	Yūki Ōnishi	January 18, 2026
Yuri is awakened by Yuriko in the next loop, and she promises to tell Yuri the truth if they can survive the current loop, which has all 15 potential crew members present with 3 Gnosia among them. Yuriko and Otome are confirmed for Guard Duty, but Yuri decides not to reveal their role as the Engineer and neither does the Doctor. With the meeting at an impasse, Yuriko volunteers to be put in cold sleep since she does not hold an important role outside Guard Duty. Before she is frozen, Yuriko warns Yuri about the existence of "Anti-Cosmic" (AC) Followers, humans who assist the Gnosia by sowing lies and confusion among the crew and can still be killed by the Gnosia, of which there is one among the crew. At the next meeting, Otome is revealed to have been eliminated. Yuri reveals Kukrushka is human, while Jonas counterclaims as Engineer and reports Setsu is human. Comet then speaks up, claiming Shigemichi was lying when he claimed he was human earlier. This results in a divided vote that sends Shigemichi to cold sleep. Later, Kukrushka approaches Yuri and claims she is the Guardian Angel. At the next meeting, Jina is eliminated and Remnan and Racio claim the Doctor role. They both confirm Shigemichi is human, while Yuri and Jonas confirm Comet is a Gnosia. After Comet is put into cold sleep, Yuri is troubled at how easily Comet was exposed. At the next meeting, nobody is eliminated thanks to the Guardian Angel. Yuri, having deduced the Gnosia's plan, exposes Racio as a Gnosia.
15	"The Final Problem"; Transliteration: "Saishū Mondai" (Japanese: 最終問題)	Yuki Iida	Yūki Ōnishi	January 25, 2026
Jonas reports that Yuri is human, but claims that they are the AC Follower, which throws the meeting into disarray. Racio then points out that they voted for Comet to be put into cold sleep, so they can't possibly be a Gnosia. Yuri has deduced that Racio deliberately sacrificed Comet, but can't prove it with Jonas and Racio teaming up. Kukrushka then comes forward and reveals her role as the Guardian Angel, pointing out she protected Yuri. In the end, the vote results in a tie between Yuri and Racio. The crew contemplate postponing the vote for the next day, but Yuri convinces them to revote. On the second vote, Sha-ming swings in favor of Yuri. Before being put into cold sleep, Racio boasts that Yuri has already fallen in to their trap. That night, Yuri deduces Chipie must be the final Gnosia, but is shocked when the report confirms he is human. The next day, Kukrushka is eliminated and Jonas claims Remnan is a Gnosia. Yuri is left wondering what Racio's trap was but has an epiphany when they remember the AC Follower always lies. Yuri then lies and also claims Remnan is a Gnosia, pointing out that Jina must have been the real Doctor, so Racio and Remnan both claimed the Doctor role. Jonas, being the AC Follower, wasn't privy to this and assumed Remnan was human. With both Engineers reporting Remnan as Gnosia, he is put into cold sleep and the Gnosia infection is cleared. Having fulfilled Yuriko's condition, Yuri then prepares to be sent to the next loop.
16	"Truth"; Transliteration: "Shinjitsu" (Japanese: 真実)	Akane Shimizu	Akagi Natsuki	February 1, 2026
Yuri wakes up in the next loop, but notes that they woke up in their bed, not the medical pod. Furthermore, they are even more confused when they discover that there is apparently no Gnosia infection on the ship, as in this world line Setsu was able to evacuate the crew safely. Suddenly, LeVi raises an alert of an anomalous lifeform detected in the medical pod. Both Yuri and Setsu rush to investigate, and they both come to the unsettling conclusion that there is a second Yuri inside the pod, which should be impossible since the Silver Key shouldn't bring a host to a timeline where they already exist. The Yuri in the medical pod wakes up, and upon seeing the other Yuri, creates a time paradox that ends the universe. While in a formless space, Yuri encounters Yuriko, who explains that Yuri is a "Bug" created by Gnos, the collective will of humanity's cyberized minds, for some unknown purpose. As a copy of the real Yuri, Bug Yuri can only exist in timelines where the real Yuri is killed by the Gnosia while in the medical pod, meaning that Bug Yuri can only exist in timelines where the Gnosia infection is present. Yuriko witnessed the creation of Bug Yuri in one timeline and comes to believe she has been tasked by Gnos to observe their journey. Yuri then loops back to the beginning of the timeline with no Gnosia infection, and despairs when their real self wakes up and the universe ends again.
17	"Bug"; Transliteration: "Bagu" (Japanese: バグ)	Yuki Iida & Arisa Matsuura	Yūki Ōnishi	February 8, 2026
Unwilling to kill the real Yuri or keep them asleep indefinitely just to preserve their own existence, Yuri attempts to commit suicide multiple times and even has Otome use her Engineer credentials to confirm their status as a Bug to try and stop the loop. However, all of these attempts fail and Yuri falls into a depression. SQ then approaches them and tries to cheer Yuri up, and Yuri reveals their existence as a Bug and the loops. SQ wonders why Yuri is so dead set on ending their own existence just because they are fake, pointing out her own status as clone. Even if she's a fake human, she's still alive, the same is true for Yuri. Inspired, Yuri attempts to ask the other crew members for help. Setsu cannot provide assistance since this version has only recently started looping and has little experience. Racio, however, points out that Yuri made the mistake of conflating their status as a Bug with the time loops, which the Silver Key is responsible for. Yuri realizes that there is information the Silver Key desires that can only be obtained in this loop. In the next loop, Yuri hides in the infirmary, and overhears Chipie telling the real Yuri how they got badly hurt protecting Setsu during the evacuation of Liu-An. Upon learning this, the Silver Key sends Yuri to a different loop, this time waking up during the ship's evacuation from Liu-An.
18	"World With A Future"; Transliteration: "Mirai aru Sekai" (Japanese: 未来ある世界)	Kanako Yajima	Yūki Ōnishi	February 15, 2026
Yuri finds themselves at "Day 0", where the ship makes its escape from Liu-An. The escape is successful, and no Gnosia infection is present much to the relief of the crew. However, Setsu doesn't seem to have any memories of the time loops or the Silver Key. Yuri consults with Racio, who explains that this is a loop where Setsu was not given their Silver Key yet. Suddenly, the ship suffers a major accident and Setsu is mortally wounded. Remembering Racio keeps a dormant Silver Key in their room, Yuri retrieves it and gives it to Setsu, saving their life but starting a time loop of them gifting Silver Keys to each other. This revelation fills up Yuri's Silver Key and it transports them to a loop where everybody is alive and celebrating their escape. Setsu guides Yuri to the infirmary where they explains the full Silver Key will open a portal to a different universe. Since their own Silver Key isn't full yet, they decides to carry the original Yuri into the other universe to prevent a paradox. After Setsu leaves through the portal, their existence is removed from the crew's memories, and after the ship reaches safety and lands, they all go their separate ways. However, Yuriko wonders if the story is truly over.
19	"Epilogue"; Transliteration: "Epirōgu" (Japanese: エピローグ)	Asuka Fukada	Susumu Nishizawa	March 1, 2026
The day after the party and Setsu's disappearance, the DQO arrives at the next inhabited planet. After an inspection by the military, the crew take the opportunity to spend some time on the surface. Yuri tells Jina about what happened with Setsu, and Jina points out that Setsu travelled to another universe, she logically wouldn't be able to give Yuri the Silver Key. Racio confirms Jina's observation, stating that Setsu likely went into the other universe to ensure Yuri never received the Silver Key in the first place. However, being unable to close her own loop, Setsu would be doomed to loop for eternity. Unwilling to accept that outcome, Yuri asks Racio to give them a new Silver Key, intending to fill it and follow Setsu into the other universe. However, Racio warns that if Yuri does that, they will just create another paradox with their other self again. Dejected, Yuri is approached by Otome, who mentions that even though she doesn't remember Setsu, she does still have an instinctual response whenver she hears the name. Realizing that traces of Setsu still linger in this universe, Yuri resolves to use the Silver Key to find them.
20	"To the World of Stars"; Transliteration: "Hoshi no Sekai e" (Japanese: 星の世界へ)	Akane Shimizu	Hiroyuki Fukushima	March 8, 2026
Yuri informs the rest of the crew of his intention to use the Silver Key to save Setsu, and they decide to hold one last party as a sendoff. Afterwards, Racio provides Yuri with a plan of action to fill up the Silver Key as quickly as possible, and Yuri activates the Silver Key. They then undergo another series of loops. However, Yuri notes that in all of the new loops, Setsu doesn't exist and Kukrushka never awakens from hibernation in storage. Eventually, Yuri reaches a loop where they convince Yuriko to hack into a Hoshibune ship so they can cyberize their mind, since Racio theorized that cyberization would be a loophole to avoid the dual existence paradox Yuri would face in the other dimension. However, this carries the risk of Yuri's consciousness being absorbed by Gnos. The cyberization process is a success, and Yuri encounters Gnos itself. This act fills up the Silver Key and opens the portal to the other universe, and Yuri enters it. Meanwhile, a new loop begins with Setsu waking up Yuri from the medical pod.
21	"End Point and Starting Point"; Transliteration: "Shūten to Shiten" (Japanese: 終点と始点)	Arisa Matsuura	Yūki Ōnishi	March 15, 2026
Setsu is shocked when they learn Yuri followed them into the other universe. Yuri explains that their cyberized mind is inhabiting the real Yuri's body, which avoids the dual existence paradox, and that they also made a deal with Gnos that once Setsu's loop was closed, Gnos would erase both the Silver Key and Yuri's status as a Bug. Yuri then learns the current loop is an exact match for the very first loop they experienced, with just Racio, Jina, and SQ forming the rest of the crew. In order to close Setsu's loop, Yuri distracts the crew while Setsu steals the Silver Key and gives it to Yuri, who absorbs it and it subsequently disappears due to Gnos' influence. Setsu's own Silver Key is filled, and they take charge of the meeting, accusing SQ of being both Manan and a Gnosia, explaining that in the various loops, she has learned Manan only successfully possesses SQ when she is the Gnosia. Manan admits defeat and prepares to be put into cold sleep, but Setsu instead suggests she transfer her consciousness into Kukrushka's body and take Setsu's Silver Key to another universe. That way, Manan would fulfill her desire for immortality. Manan agrees to the deal and leaves for another universe as Kukrushka. With the Gnosia threat dealt with, both Yuri and Setsu rest in the ship's observation deck as the ship prepares to warp to their next destination.

=== Reception ===
The Encyclopedia of Science Fiction described Gnosia as an entertaining anime despite criticizing the artificial and sometimes implausible elements of its narrative, which it attributed to the difficulties of adapting a puzzle-based social deduction game into a television series. It particularly questioned the arbitrary rules governing the setting, such as the spaceship's artificial intelligence being able to detect the presence of Gnosia without identifying individual carriers. The encyclopedia highlighted the series' exploration of identity, time loops and collective consciousness, including the protagonist's discovery that he is a duplicate rather than the original Yuri. It also noted the representation of gender diversity, with the androgynous protagonist appearing as female in one loop and Setsu being non-binary. Although it found the explanation for Yuri's existence as a duplicate unconvincing, it concluded that the series remained enjoyable for viewers willing to accept its narrative contrivances.

== See also ==
- They Were Eleven
