= Asahi Sonorama =

Japanese publishing company

Asahi Shimbun Publications Inc.
- Parent company: The Asahi Shimbun Company
- Status: Active
- Predecessor: Asahi Sonorama
- Founded: 1 April 2008; 18 years ago
- Headquarters location: Tsukiji, Chuo, Tokyo, Japan
- Fiction genres: Various
- No. of employees: 211
- Official website: publications.asahi.com

Asahi Sonorama
- Parent company: The Asahi Shimbun Company
- Founded: 9 September 1959; 67 years ago
- Successor: Asahi Shimbun Publications
- Headquarters location: 6-11-7 Orikomi Building, Ginza, Chūō-ku, Tokyo, Japan
- Key people: Takashi Iida (President)
- Official website: publications.asahi.com

Asahi Shimbun Publications Inc. (株式会社朝日新聞出版, Kabushiki gaisha Asahi Shimbun Shuppan) is the publishing arm of The Asahi Shimbun Company, publishing books, magazines, and manga. It replaced Asahi Sonorama (朝日ソノラマ) (Note: "Sonorama" is a coined word combining sonus, the Latin word for "sound", and horama, the Greek word for "sight". The name was acquired through the purchase of the trademark for sonosheets) on 1 April 2008 just after it went bankrupt.

== History ==
Asahi Sonorama was created as a division of Asahi Shimbunsha on September 9, 1959, under the name "Asahi Sonopress". It was initially established to record interviews, news, crime scene investigations, and articles on a variety of topics, and then release them on tape and sonosheets in the audio recording magazine Asahi Sonorama (from whence the company got its name). While doing this, the company also began publishing other magazines, manga collections, and novels.

Even though the sound quality of sonosheets was lower than that of vinyl records, the sonosheets were flexible and could last a long time. Asahi Sonorama found a market among those who could not afford the high price of LP records and was therefore able to enter the record market and compete with record companies and publishers.

After a time, however, the magazine and the sonosheet started having different content, and sale started dropping, so the magazine began changing its area of specialty toward having more child-oriented music and content. As anime, manga, tokusatsu, TV dramas, and the like became more popular, the magazine became more of a digest or anthology of stories, theme songs, and pictures from these series. Because of this, people began purchasing the magazine as a gift for children and sales began to be brisk again. However, the various record companies and publishers began taking advantage of this popularity by publishing their own magazines and sonosheets.

In the 1960s, due to the huge rise in the number of television shows targeting children, there was also a huge rise in the amount of material to choose from for inclusion in Asahi Sonorama. Since all of them were drawing from the same sources, the Asahi Sonorama and its rivals would often release sonosheets and vinyl records at the same time. Asahi Sonorama (the company) began to move into the vinyl record market at this time. In 1966, the company's name was changed from "Asahi Sonopress" to "Asahi Sonorama".

Due to the flooding of the market with similar goods, many companies began going under in the 1970s because they couldn't maintain their production levels and still make a profit. Asahi Sonorama was able to improve their manufacturing technique for the sonosheets to the point where they could attach paper labels to them, calling them "punch sheets" instead of "sonosheets". They also improved the sound quality, allowing them to release anime and tokusatsu picture books with the included punch sheet in stereo instead of mono sound. In 1975, Asahi Sonorama established its "Sonorama Bunko" imprint, and in September that same year began publication of the magazine Manga Shōnen.

Unfortunately, the market for picture books with included records disappeared quickly in the 1980s, so they refocused their attention on the regular publishing business.

Between June 21, 2007, and September 30 of the same year, Asahi Sonorama went through bankruptcy liquidation proceedings. The trademarks for "Sonosheet" and "Asahi Sonorama" were passed to their parent company, Asahi Shimbunsha (publisher of the Asahi Shimbun), and publication rights were handled by the publication division of that company. On April 1, 2008, Asahi Shimbunsha spun off its publication division into a subsidiary company, Asahi Shimbun Publications, and Asahi Sonorama is now considered a division of that company.

== Publications ==
- ChakiChaki (チャキチャキ), a monthly manga magazine
- Duo (デュオ), a monthly manga magazine
- Fantasutikku Corekushon (ファンタスティックコレクション; Fantastic Collection) referred to as Fantasutikku TV Corekushon (ファンタスティックTVコレクション; Fantastic TV Collection) through issue three.
- GOOD★COME (グッカム), a celebrity magazine focusing on young male actors. Beginning with volume 2, the magazine was published by Shufunotomo (主婦の友社, Shufu no Tomo sha). Beginning with volume 5, Tokyo News Service (東京ニュース通信社, Tōkyō Nyūsu Tsuūshin sha) became the sales agency for the magazine.
- Harowin (ハロウィン; Halloween), a monthly manga magazine
- Hīrō vijon (ヒーローヴィジョン; Hero Vision) , a tokusatsu media coverage magazine
- Honto ni Atta Kowai Hanashi (ほんとにあった怖い話; Scary stories that really happened), a horror story and manga magazine
- Honto ni Atta Waratchau Hanashi (ほんとにあった笑っちゃう話; Funny stories that really happened), a formerly published humor story and manga magazine which ceased publication in 2008
- Kikan Kamera Rebyū (季刊カメラレビュー; Quarterly Camera Review)
- Kurashikku Kamera Senka (クラシックカメラ専科; Classic Camera Specialty), a photography magazine
- Manga Shōnen (マンガ少年), a monthly shōnen manga magazine
- Monthly Halloween, a monthly horror manga magazine
- Nemuki (ネムキ), a "weird tales" josei manga magazine, originally titled Nemurenu Yoru no Kimyō na Hanashi (眠れぬ夜の奇妙な話; Strange stories of sleepless nights)
  - Mugenkan (夢幻館; Specter Mansion), a special quarterly issue of Nemuki
- Shishiō (獅子王; Lion King), a science fiction and fantasy novel magazine. There were 74 issues from early Summer 1985 through May 1992.
  - Gurifon (グリフォン; Griffon), a quarterly science fiction and fantasy novel magazine. As the continuation of Shishiō, there were seven issues from November 1992 through May 1994. It published novels by authors such as Shinji Kajio, Yūichi Sasamoto, and Hideyuki Kikuchi, and manga by artists such as Yoshitō Asari and Yukinobu Hoshino (2001 Nights). In the 1994 Spring issue, the publishers included a message stating that the magazine would be ceasing publication within the year, and there haven't been any issues since then. It is assumed the magazine has ceased publication.
- Uchūsen (宇宙船; Spaceship), a science fiction special effects magazine which ceased publication with the July 2005 issue. Hobby Japan acquired the rights to the publication in 2007, and the magazine began publication again in 2008.

== Imprints ==
=== Novels ===
- Asahi Sonorama

=== Manga ===
- Halloween Comics
- Halloween Shōjo Comic Kan
- Honto ni Atta Kowai Hanashi Comics
- Izumi Takemoto dashinaoshi
- Nemurenu Yoru no Kimyō na Hanashi Comics
- Sonorama Comic Bunko
- Sun Comics
- Sun Wide Comics
