= List of Dark Horse Comics reprints =

This is a list of material originally published by other companies that has been reprinted as collected editions or trade paperbacks by Dark Horse Comics, including manga and manhwa series that were translated and distributed in America.

== North American comics ==
Title	Vol.	Vol. title	Material collected	Format	Pages	Publication date	ISBN	Original series publisher	Notes
2 Past Midnight			2 Past Midnight #1–5	TP	128	June 2014	978-1-61655-440-8	Dynamics, Inc. (digitally)	
2 Sisters: A Super-Spy Graphic Novel			2 Sisters	HC	344	September 2015	978-1-61655-721-8	Top Shelf Productions	
Abraham Stone			Abraham Stone: Country Mouse, City Rat; Abraham Stone #1–2	TP	152	March 2020	978-1-5067-1662-6	Malibu Comics; Marvel Comics	
Action Philosophers!			Action Philosophers! #1–9; a new eight-page story	HC	352	October 2014	978-1-61655-539-9	Self-published	
Adrenalynn: Weapon of War			Adrenalynn: Weapon of War #1–4	TP	96	October 2001	978-1-56971-621-2	Image Comics under the F5 Entertainment imprint	
Adventures into the Unknown! Archives	1		Adventures into the Unknown #1–4	HC	216	May 2012	978-1-59582-930-6	American Comics Group	
Adventures into the Unknown! Archives	2		Adventures into the Unknown #5–8	HC	224	February 2013	978-1-61655-045-5	American Comics Group	
Adventures into the Unknown! Archives	3		Adventures into the Unknown #9–12	HC	216	September 2013	978-1-61655-185-8	American Comics Group	
Adventures into the Unknown! Archives	4		Adventures into the Unknown #13–16	HC		March 2015	978-1-61655-623-5	American Comics Group	
The Adventures of Nilson Groundthumper and Hermy			Nilson Groundthumper and Hemy shorts from: Albedo Anthropomorphics #1, 5;Critters #5, 16, 27, Special #1; Dark Horse Presents (vol. 3) #30; Furrlough #50; Usagi Yojimbo (vol. 1) #19; Usagi Yojimbo (vol. 2) #9; Usagi Yojimbo Color Special (Fantagraphics) #1–3	HC		March 2014	978-1-61655-341-8	Thoughts & Images; Fantagraphics Books; Antarctic Press; Mirage Studios	
Afterlift			Afterlift #1–5	TP	136	February 2021	978-1-5067-2440-9	ComiXology Originals (digitally)	
Al Capp's Shmoo	The Complete Comic Books		All Capp's Shmoo Comics #1–5	HC	176	March 2008	978-1-59307-901-7	Toby Press	
Al Capp's Shmoo	2	The Complete Newspaper Strips!!	Every weekly and Sunday Shmoo newspaper appearance from 1948 to 1976.	HC	188	June 2011	978-1-59582-720-3		
Al Capp's Li'l Abner: The Frazetta Years	1	(1954–55)	Every Li'l Abner strip from 1954 and 1955.	HC	128	September 2003	978-1-56971-959-6	United Feature Syndicate	
Al Capp's Li'l Abner: The Frazetta Years	2	(1956–57)	Every Li'l Abner strip from 1956 and 1957.	HC	128	November 2003	978-1-56971-976-3	United Feature Syndicate	
Al Capp's Li'l Abner: The Frazetta Years	3	(1958–59)	Every Li'l Abner strip from 1958 and 1959.	HC	128	January 2004	978-1-56971-977-0	United Feature Syndicate	
Al Capp's Li'l Abner: The Frazetta Years	4	(1960–61)	Every Li'l Abner strip from 1960 and 1961.	HC	120	January 2004	978-1-59307-133-2	United Feature Syndicate	
Al Williamson: Hidden Lands			Al Williamson's works from: Adventures into the Unknown #27; Astonishing #57; Battle #55; Cheyenne Kid #10; Eerie Tales #1; Forbidden Worlds #69; Gunsmoke Western #33; Incredible Science Fiction #32; Jann of the Jungle #16; Kid Colt Outlaw #57–58; Marvel Tales #144; My Own Romance #71; Mystery Tales #46; Six-Gun Western #2; Strange Worlds #4; Tales of Suspense #1; Two-Gun Kid #51; Two Gun Western #11; Valor #2–3; Western Kid #9; Western Outlaws #11; Wild Western #55; World of Suspense #3; Wyatt Earp #7; three stories from previously unpublished Jann of the Jungle comic	TP	224	October 2004	978-1-56971-816-2	American Comics Group; Atlas Comics; Charlton Comics; Hastings; Dell Comics; EC Comics; Harvey Comics	
Alien Legion Omnibus	1		Alien Legion #1–11; Alien Legion: Slaughterworld	TP	352	November 2009	978-1-59582-394-6	Epic Comics	
Alien Legion Omnibus	2		Alien Legion #12–20; Marvel Graphic Novel: The Alien Legion – A Grey Day to Die	TP	352	May 2010	978-1-59582-494-3	Epic Comics	
Alley Oop: The Complete Sundays	1	1934-1936	Every Alley Oop Sunday strip from 1934 to 1936.	HC	128	April 2014	978-1-61655-335-7	Newspaper Enterprise Association	
Alley Oop: The Complete Sundays	2	1937-1939	Every Alley Oop Sunday strip from 1937 to 1939.	HC		September 2014	978-1-61655-465-1	Newspaper Enterprise Association	
Almuric			"Almuric" from Epic Illustrated #2–5	TP	72	February 1991	978-1-878574-18-3	Marvel Comics	
Archie Archives	1		Archie Comics #1–2; Jackpot Comics #4–8; Archie stories from Pep Comics #22–38	HC	160	April 2011	978-1-59582-716-6	Archie Comics	
Archie Archives	2		Archie Comics #3–6; Jackpot Comics #9; Archie stories from Pep Comics #39–45	HC	232	September 2011	978-1-59582-791-3	Archie Comics	
Archie Archives	3		Archie Comics #7–10; Pep Comics #46–50	HC	224	October 2011	978-1-59582-833-0	Archie Comics	
Archie Archives	4		Archie Comics #11–14; Pep Comics #51–53	HC	232	January 2012	978-1-59582-856-9	Archie Comics	
Archie Archives	5		Archie Comics #15–18; Pep Comics #54–56	HC		April 2012	978-1-59582-857-6	Archie Comics	
Archie Archives	6		Archie Comics #19–22; Pep Comics #57–58	HC	232	August 2012	978-1-59582-915-3	Archie Comics	
Archie Archives	7		Archie Comics #23–25; Laugh Comics #20–21; Pep Comics #59–61	HC	232	October 2012	978-1-59582-977-1	Archie Comics	
Archie Archives	8		Archie Comics #26–28; Laugh Comics #22–23; Pep Comics #62–64	HC	240	February 2013	978-1-59582-995-5	Archie Comics	
Archie Archives	9		Archie Comics #29–31; Laugh Comics #25–26; Pep Comics #65–67	HC	240	March 2014	978-1-61655-285-5	Archie Comics	
Archie Archives	10		Archie Comics #32–34; Laugh Comics #27–28; Pep Comics #67–69	HC	264	August 2014	978-1-61655-397-5	Archie Comics	
Archie Archives	11		Archie Comics #35–36; Laugh Comics #29–31; Pep Comics #70–72	HC	232	July 2015	978-1-61655-702-7	Archie Comics	
Archie Archives	12		Archie Comics #37–39; Laugh Comics #32–34; Pep Comics #73–75	HC	240	February 2016	978-1-61655-705-8	Archie Comics	
Archie Archives	13		Archie Comics #40; Laugh Comics #35–37; Pep Comics #76–78	HC	240	October 2016	978-1-5067-0020-5	Archie Comics	
Archie Archives	Prom Pranks and Other Stories		Archie Comics #1–2; Jackpot Comics #4–8; Archie stories from Pep Comics #22–38	TP	240	November 2015	978-1-61655-936-6	Archie Comics	
Archie Archives	Spring Fever and Other Stories		Archie Comics #3–6; Jackpot Comics #9; Archie stories from Pep Comics #39–45	TP	232	May 2016	978-1-61655-939-7	Archie Comics	
Archie Archives	The Double Date and Other Stories		Archie Comics #7–10; Pep Comics #46–50	TP	232	November 2016	978-1-5067-0026-7	Archie Comics	
Archie Firsts			Archie Comics #1; Archie's Girls Betty and Veronica #1; Archie's Pal Jughead #1; Archie's Rival Reggie #1; Jackpot Comics #5; Pep Comics #1	HC	160	December 2010	978-1-59582-571-1	Archie Comics	
Archie's Pal Jughead Archives	1		Archie's Pal Jughead #1–8	HC	232	March 2015	978-1-61655-118-6	Archie Comics	
Archie's Pal Jughead Archives	2		Archie's Pal Jughead #9–16	HC	240	June 2016	978-1-61655-987-8	Archie Comics	
Aw Yeah Comics!	And... Action!		Aw Yeah Comics! #1–4			Sep 2014		Series also includes new material	
Aw Yeah Comics!	2	Time for... Adventure!	Aw Yeah Comics! #5–8			Jun 2015			
Aw Yeah Comics!	3	Make Way... for Awesome!	Aw Yeah Comics! #9–12			Jun 2016			
Boris Karloff Tales of Mystery									
Brain Boy	1		Four Color Comics #1330; Brain Boy #1-5	HC		December 2011	978-1-59582-816-3		
Creepy	1		Creepy #1-5	HC		August 2008	978-1-59307-987-1		
Creepy	2		Creepy #6-10	HC		November 2008	978-1-59582-168-3		
Creepy	3			HC		April 2009			
Creepy	4			HC		August 2009			
Creepy	5			HC		January 2010			
Creepy	6			HC		February 2010			
Creepy	7			HC		June 2010			
Creepy	8			HC		November 2010			
Creepy	9			HC		January 2011			
Creepy	10			HC		July 2011			
Creepy	11			HC		October 2011			
Creepy	12			HC		February 2012			
Creepy	13			HC		March 2012			
Creepy	14			HC		October 2012			
Creepy	15			HC		February 2013			
Creepy	16			HC		June 2013			
Creepy	17			HC		October 2013			
Creepy	18			HC		February 2014			
Creepy	19			HC		June 2014			
Creepy	20			HC		October 2014			
Creepy	21			HC		February 2015			
Creepy	22			HC		September 2015			
Creepy	23			HC		February 2016			
Creepy	24			HC		August 2016			
Creepy	26			HC		July 2018			
Creepy	27			HC		November 2018			
Creepy	28			HC		March 2019			
Creepy	29			HC		July 2019			
Crime Does Not Pay (comics)									
Dagar the Invincible									
Doctor Solar: Man of the Atom	1		Doctor Solar: Man of the Atom #1–7	HC		Dec 2004		ISBN 1-59307-285-6	
Doctor Solar: Man of the Atom	2		Doctor Solar: Man of the Atom #8–14	HC		Jun 2005		ISBN 1-59307-327-5	
Doctor Solar: Man of the Atom	3		Doctor Solar: Man of the Atom #15–22	HC		Sep 2005		ISBN 1-59307-374-7	
Doctor Solar: Man of the Atom	4		Doctor Solar: Man of the Atom #23–31; The Occult Files of Dr. Spektor #14	HC		Nov 2007		ISBN 1-59307-825-0	
Eerie									
Flash Gordon									
Green Lama									
Herbie Popnecker									
Harvey Comics Classics									
Little Lulu									
Magnus, Robot Fighter									
Magic Man American Comics Group									
M.A.R.S. Patrol Total War									
Mighty Samson									
Nemesis American Comics Group									
Nexus (comics)									
The Occult Files of Doctor Spektor									
Roy Rogers									
The Chronicles of Conan								Reprinting Marvel's Conan the Barbarian and other comics.	
The Savage Sword of Conan								Reprinting Marvel's Savage Sword of Conan.	
A Second Chance at Sarah			A Second Chance at Sarah	HC	96	August 2014	978-1-61655-423-1	Ape Entertainment	
Space Family Robinson									
Star Wars									
Tarzan									
Thun'da King of the Congo									
Tubby									
Turok									
Xenozoic Tales	1	After the End	Xenozoic Tales #1–6; Death Rattle (vol. 2) #5			Apr 2003		Kitchen Sink Press	
Xenozoic Tales	2	The New World	Xenozoic Tales #7–14			Jul 2003			

== European comics ==
Title	Vol.	Vol. title	Material collected	Format	Pages	Publication date	ISBN	Original series publisher	Notes
Afrika			Afrika	HC	64	February 2012	978-1-59582-844-6		
Aquablue			Aquablue #1			November 1989	978-1-878574-00-8	Delcourt	
Aquablue	The Blue Planet		Aquablue #2			August 1990	978-1-878574-04-6	Delcourt	
Hound			Hound #1-3	HC	504	March 2022	978-1-5067-2749-3	BreakThru Productions	

== Manga ==
Unless otherwise noted, the manga volumes contain the same material (but translated) as the original language volumes.

Title	Vol.	Vol. title	Material collected	Format	Pages	Publication date	ISBN	Notes
3x3 Eyes	1	House of Demons	3x3 Eyes Volume 1	TP		March 1995	978-1-56971-059-3	
3x3 Eyes	1	House of Demons	3x3 Eyes Volume 1	TP	160	May 2003	978-1-56971-931-2	Second edition.
3x3 Eyes	2	Curse of the Gesu	3x3 Eyes: Curse of the Gesu #1–5 (Dark Horse Comics series)	TP		February 1997	978-1-56971-175-0	
3x3 Eyes	2	Curse of the Gesu	3x3 Eyes: Curse of the Gesu #1–5 (Dark Horse Comics series)	TP	152	May 2003	978-1-56971-930-5	Second edition.
3x3 Eyes	3	Flight of the Demon	3x3 Eyes Volume 3	TP	208	November 2001	978-1-56971-553-6	
3x3 Eyes	4	Blood of the Sacred Demon	3x3 Eyes Volume 4	TP	144	March 2002	978-1-56971-735-6	
3x3 Eyes	5	Summoning of the Beast	3x3 Eyes Volume 5	TP	152	August 2002	978-1-56971-747-9	
3x3 Eyes	6	Key to the Sacred Land	3x3 Eyes Volume 6	TP	136	January 2003	978-1-56971-881-0	
3x3 Eyes	7	The Shadow of Kunlun	3x3 Eyes Volume 7	TP	224	August 2003	978-1-56971-981-7	
3x3 Eyes	8	Descent of the Mystic City	3x3 Eyes stories from Super Manga Blast! #32–40	TP	288	May 2004	978-1-59307-216-2	
Akira	1		Akira Volume 1	TP	364	December 2000	978-1-56971-498-0	
Akira	2		Akira Volume 2	TP	304	March 2001	978-1-56971-499-7	
Akira	3		Akira Volume 3	TP	288	June 2001	978-1-56971-525-3	
Akira	4		Akira Volume 4	TP	400	September 2001	978-1-56971-526-0	
Akira	5		Akira Volume 5	TP	416	December 2001	978-1-56971-527-7	
Akira	6		Akira Volume 6	TP	440	March 2002	978-1-56971-528-4	
Akira	Club			TP	256	August 2007	978-1-59307-741-9	
Angelic Layer	Book 1			TP	480	September 2012	978-1-61655-021-9	
Angelic Layer	Book 2			TP	480	March 2013	978-1-61655-128-5	
Appleseed	1	The Promethean Challenge	Appleseed Volume 1	TP		March 1995	978-1-56971-070-8	
Appleseed	1	The Promethean Challenge	Appleseed Volume 1	TP	184	November 2007	978-1-59307-691-7	Third edition.
Appleseed	2	Prometheus Unbound	Appleseed Volume 2	HC		May 1987	978-1-56060-081-7	Limited edition.
Appleseed	2	Prometheus Unbound	Appleseed Volume 2	TP		March 1995	978-1-56971-071-5	
Appleseed	2	Prometheus Unbound	Appleseed Volume 2	TP	192	May 2008	978-1-59307-692-4	Third edition.
Appleseed	3	The Scales of Prometheus	Appleseed Volume 3	HC		January 1989	978-1-56971-010-4	Limited edition.
Appleseed	3	The Scales of Prometheus	Appleseed Volume 3	TP		March 1995	978-1-56971-072-2	
Appleseed	3	The Scales of Prometheus	Appleseed Volume 3	TP	216	August 2008	978-1-59307-693-1	Third edition.
Appleseed	4	The Promethean Balance	Appleseed Volume 4	TP		March 1995	978-1-56971-074-6	
Appleseed	4	The Promethean Balance	Appleseed Volume 4	TP	216	March 2009	978-1-59307-694-8	Third edition.
Appleseed	Hypernotes		Appleseed stories from Super Manga Blast! #25–39	TP	160	October 2007	978-1-59307-446-3	
Appleseed	ID		Appleseed ID	TP	144	December 2007	978-1-59307-690-0	
Astro Boy	1		"The Birth of Astro Boy"; Chapters 43 and 42	TP		Mar 2002		
Astro Boy	2		Chapters 40, 45 and 49	TP		Apr 2002		
Astro Boy	3		Chapters 54 and 27	TP		May 2002		
Astro Boy	4		Chapters 47, 30, 39 and 21	TP		Jun 2002		
Astro Boy	5		Chapters 25, 36 and 35	TP		Jul 2002		
Astro Boy	6		Chapters 73, 74, 75, 76, 78, 79, 80 and 81	TP		Sep 2002		
Astro Boy	7		Chapters 82, 85, 86, 87, 88 and 89	TP		Sep 2002		
Astro Boy	8		Chapters 90, 91, 92, 93 and 72	TP		Oct 2002		
Astro Boy	9		Chapters 31, 37 and 8	TP		Nov 2002		
Astro Boy	10		Chapters 48, 15, 74 and 64	TP		Dec 2002		
Astro Boy	11		Chapters 53, 34, 84 and 44	TP		Jan 2003		
Astro Boy	12		Chapters 62, 29, 13 and 66	TP		Feb 2003		
Astro Boy	13		Chapters 77, 16 and 57; "Astro Boy's Origin and History, Part 1"	TP		Mar 2003		
Astro Boy	14		Chapters 41, 38, 50, 26 and 12; "Astro Boy's Origin and History, Part 2"	TP		Apr 2003		
Astro Boy	15		Chapters 11, 22, 1 and 2	TP		May 2003		
Astro Boy	16		Chapters 4, 18, 63 and 52	TP		Jun 2003		
Astro Boy	17		Chapters 14, 32, 10, 67 and 46	TP		Jul 2003		
Astro Boy	18		Chapters 51, 28, 17, 33 and 23	TP		Aug 2003		
Astro Boy	19		Chapters 65 and 68	TP		Oct 2003		
Astro Boy	20		Chapters 70 and 71; "Astro Boy's Origin and History, Part 3"	TP		Nov 2003		
Astro Boy	21		Chapters 20, 6, 7, 5, 3, 9, 19 and 24	TP		Nov 2003		
Astro Boy	22		Chapters 97, 83, 99, 94, 61, 98, 56, 96, 55, 59, 58 and 95	TP		Dec 2003		
Astro Boy	23		Chapters 101, 102, 103, 104, 105, 106, 107, 108, 109, 110, 111, 112, 113, 114, 115, 100	TP		Jan 2004		
Astro Boy	1 & 2		Astro Boy Volumes 1– 2	TP	424	September 2008	978-1-59582-153-9	
Astro Boy Omnibus	1		Astro Boy Volumes 1–3	TP	688	September 2015	978-1-61655-860-4	
Astro Boy Omnibus	2			TP	680	December 2015	978-1-61655-861-1	
Astro Boy Omnibus	3		Astro Boy Volumes 8–9 and three stories from Volume 7	TP	696	March 2016	978-1-61655-893-2	
Astro Boy Omnibus	4		Astro Boy Volumes 11–13 and one story from Volume 10	TP	688	June 2016	978-1-61655-956-4	
Astro Boy Omnibus	5			TP	696	October 2016	978-1-5067-0016-8	
Astro Boy Omnibus	6			TP	704	December 2016	978-1-5067-0041-0	
Astro Boy Omnibus	7			TP	720	April 2017	978-1-5067-0128-8	
Berserk								
Black Magic M-66								
Blade of the Immortal								
Blood+								
Bubblegum Crisis (Bubblegum Crisis: Grand Mal)								
Cannon God Exaxxion								
Caravan Kidd								
Cardcaptor Sakura								
Chobits								
Club 9								
Crying Freeman								
Dominion								
Domu								
Drakuun								
Eden: It's an Endless World!								
Gantz								
Ghost in the Shell								
Gungrave								
Gunsmith Cats								
Gunsmith Cats Burst								
Hellhounds: Panzer Cops (Kenrou Densetsu)								
Hellsing								
Hipira								
Intron Depot								
Ju-on								
King of Wolves								
Kurosagi Corpse Delivery Service								
Lady Snowblood								
Legend of Mother Sarah								
Lone Wolf and Cub								
Lost World								
Mail								
Metropolis								
MPD Psycho								
Nextworld								
Ohikkoshi								
Oh My Goddess!								
Oldboy								
Opus								
Orion								
Outlanders								
Octopus Girl								
One Missed Call								
Path of the Assassin								
Reiko the Zombie Shop								
Samurai Executioner								
Satsuma Gishiden								
School Zone								
Seraphic Feather								
Masakuzu Katsura's Shadow Lady: Sudden Death								
Shadow Star (Narutaru)								
Spirit of Wonder								
Super Manga Blast!								
Katsuya Terada's The Monkey King								
The Ring								
Two Faces of Tomn								
Tapenshu								
Tomie (Museum of Terror)								
Trigun								
Translucent								
Venus Wars								
Wandering Island								
What's Michael?								
Who Fighter with Heart of Darkness								
You're Under Arrest		The Wild Ones	Reprints from volumes 6 and 7 of Japanese series			Oct 1997		
You're Under Arrest		Lights and Siren	Reprints from volumes 6 and 7 of Japanese series			Dec 1999		

== Manhwa ==
Title	Vol.	Publication dates	Notes
Banya: The Explosive Delivery Man			
Bride of the Water God			
Chunchu: The Genocide Fiend			
Shaman Warrior			
XS	1–3	Jun 2007 – Dec 2007	

== Webcomics ==
Title	Vol.	Vol. title	Material collected	Format	Pages	Publication date	ISBN	Notes
Achewood	1	The Great Outdoor Fight	Strips from January 11, 2006, to March 30, 2006, plus bonus material.	HC	104	August 2008	978-1-59307-997-0	
Achewood	2	Worst Song, Played on Ugliest Guitar	Strips from January 10, 2002, to May 7, 2002, plus "Before We Were Achewood: The Early Experiments" (December 10 to 17, 2001) and bonus material.	HC	136	September 2009	978-1-59582-239-0	
Achewood	3	A Home for Scared People	Strips from May 8, 2002, to October 29, 2002, plus "Before We Were Achewood, Concluded" (December 18, 2001, to January 9, 2002) and bonus material.	HC	104	November 2010	978-1-59582-450-9	
The Adventures of Dr. McNinja	1	Night Powers	"Monster Mart"; "Death Volley"; "Doc Gets Rad"; new story "Beyond Winter Wonderdrome"	TP	232	May 2011	978-1-59582-709-8	
The Adventures of Dr. McNinja	2	Timefist	"Army of One"; "Judy Gets a Kitten"; "Space Savers"; "Future Trading"; "Stolen Pizza, Stolen Lives"	TP	232	December 2012	978-1-61655-069-1	
The Adventures of Dr. McNinja	3	King Radical	"Prologue!"; "AWOL MD"; "A Cumberland Ninja in King Radical's Court"; "All the King's Dirtbikes and All the King's Men"	TP	312	July 2015	978-1-61655-727-0	
The Adventures of Dr. McNinja Omnibus	1		The Adventures of Dr. McNinja Vol. 1-3 trade paperbacks (self-published)	TP	504	July 2013	978-1-61655-180-3	
Applegeeks	1	Freshman Year	Strips from the first two years.	TP	184	May 2009	978-1-59582-174-4	
Applegeeks	2	Weird Science	Strips from 2005 and 2006.	TP	184	October 2009	978-1-59582-337-3	
