= List of Fantastic Children characters =

Fantastic Children (ファンタジックチルドレン, Fantajikku Chirudoren) has a large cast of characters.

== Character histories ==
=== Main characters ===
Tohma (トーマ) Voiced by Junko Minagawa (Tohma) and Satoshi Goto (Sess/Seth) (Japanese), Edward Choy Keng Choong (Tohma) and Joe Murray (Sess/Seth) (English)

Tohma is one of the main protagonists of the series. He is an enthusiastic and energetic young boy, who is impulsive and quick to anger, but has good intentions and looks out for both Helga and Chitto. He lives with his mother and father on Papen Island and is homeschooled by his father, who teaches him a unique form of martial arts called Papan Kenpo. Tohma first meets Helga after she ran away from an orphanage in Chikao, and he later helps her escape permanently. Near the end of the anime, Tohma is revealed to be the reincarnation of Sess/Seth (セス, Sesu), the son of Titas' trusted friend and advisor, Goto. Sess was betrothed to Tina since his birth because of their parents' friendship; during his and Tina's first meeting, he vowed to protect her. Sess loves Tina deeply but she does not reciprocate due to her love for Soran. Sess becomes jealous that when Tina wreaks havoc while in a trance, it is Soran's voice and not Sess' who reaches out to Tina. Upon hearing that Tina's soul is about to be sent to Earth, Sess kills Soran with a discarded gun, causing Sess to become horrified of his actions. Attempting to redeem himself, it was Sess and not Soran who sent Tina's spirit to Earth before dying of his injuries sustained from the attack caused by Tina's trance and later from Georca's forces, unaware that he was near the Orsel that causes his soul to be reincarnated on Earth as Tohma. At first, Tohma doesn't remember anything of his past, though his feelings for Helga remain until the end of the anime when he finally recovers his memories after discovering Tina's corpse. Unlike Helga and the Befort Children, Tohma along to Chitto does not appear as an adult in the epilogue nor in the extended special ending.

Helga (ヘルガ, Heruga) Voiced by Shiho Kawaragi (Japanese), Meriem Bekka (English)

Helga is the other protagonist of the series. She is a reserved and introverted young girl who spends much of her time drawing pictures and often worries about others around her. She and her friend, Chitto, attempt to escape from an orphanage to search for a place Helga has envisioned, which was often the subject of her drawings. She is revealed to be the third reincarnation of the princess of Greecia, Tina (ティナ), a caring, cheerful and tomboyish daughter of King Titas. After being killed in an explosion and revived using Orsel, Tina becomes little more than a weapon. To prevent an all-out war in Greecia, the scientists use the Orsel to send Tina's spirit onto Earth. However, during her final moments in Greecia, she was not sent away by her lover Soran, but by her betrothed Sess, who killed Soran in a fit of jealousy, only to regret his mistakes and it was he and not Soran who send Tina's spirit to Earth instead. Prior to her life as Helga, she was first reincarnated as a teacher named Christina, and then a painter named Serafine. At the end of the anime, Helga is finally reunited with the reincarnated Soran as a 21-year-old teacher in school.

Chitto (チット) Voiced by: Kei Kobayashi (Japanese), Marian Elizabeth Spencer (English)

A good-hearted young boy who wishes to earnestly help Helga in her quest to find the place from her drawings. Like Tohma, Chitto does not appear as an adult in the epilogue nor in the extended special ending.

==== Befort Children ====
The Befort Children (べフォールの子供たち, Befōru no Kodomotachi) are a group of children who, for 500 years prior to the story of Fantastic Children, have been spotted in various places throughout Europe in the story. When they were first born into families, they had natural-colored hair, which shortly after turned white and their eyes turned blue. They run away from their families and join the group, only to die at around age 12 and be reborn elsewhere. The Befort Children come from the planet Greecia (ギリシア, Girishia), which is mostly made up of water, in search of their princess, Tina.
Agi (アギ) Voiced by: Yū Urata
Leader of both the Befort Children on Earth and the team of scientists during their time spent on Greecia. He often does the talking for the group and takes responsibility for their actions. He comes across as a very quiet, distant person, but he does in fact care more about the people around him than he lets on. This side of him rarely shows through because he is so determined to find Tina and often scolds the others for not having their priorities straight. On earth, his host family called him Ian Cole, and he had one younger sister, Belle. Though he never outright admits it, the viewer learns that he was in fact attached to his sister and to his family (his mother says he did everything he could to help out, as if he knew he wasn't going to be there forever). The series' special ending showed him returning to his home and sister on Sanceli Island. A later scene showed him with his hair having returned to its original brown.
Soreto (ソレト) Voiced by: Yukiko Takaguchi
She appears to be second in command because she is often by Agi's side. She, too has a very strong will and determination to find the princess, which masks her longing to return home, although she does seem a little more sympathetic towards the other members when they make mistakes. It is she who first learns of Helga and reports this information back to the rest of the children. On Earth, she was an only child named Flo, but after she left her family to search for Tina, her father changed drastically from a strong, lively man to a drunkard. Soreto sees him in the window of the Lam Café in Clairmont as she is running back to tell the others the news; their eyes meet, and instantly he rushes out to find her. She then ducks into an alleyway, crying to herself as he runs off down the street. The series' Special Ending shows her return to her father. She lived in Northedge.
Hesma (ヒースマ) Voiced by: Katsuhiro Harasawa
Of all the Befort Children (sans Palza and Mel, who leave in the first episode), the one whose life on earth we know least about. Nothing is revealed about the life he led before breaking away to search for Tina, but then again, he doesn't want anything to be revealed. Hiisuma hates the earth and the people living in it and will stop at nothing to return to Greecia. But like all the others, his bad attitude is just his way of coping with the situation; he just takes it to another level. Unfortunately, Hiisuma is easily controlled; on Greecia, Georca and his cronies take him hostage and force him to use the Orsel control board when Tina goes berserk, and on Earth he makes a deal with Dumas (which backfires on him) in order to get the data he needs from the GED organization. Hiisuma dies after Dumas betrays him and sends the capsule containing their preserved Grecian bodies crashing down on the earth from the skies, where he finally reveals his true emotions and his strong desire to return to his homeland. The series Special Ending briefly depicts his funeral. In attendance were apparently a mother and father, brother and sister, two men, a priest, and one other couple. On Earth, he went by the name of Thomas and lived in Wattford.
Hasmodai (ハスモダイ) Voiced by: Sachi Matsumoto
Of all the children (even Palza and Mel), appears to be the most emotional and weak-willed, with Hiisuma perhaps being the most cold-hearted and strongest. Enma nearly consumes him twice, tempting him with memories of the life he could have had on earth, where he had been born into a noble family as Andrew Chaseman in the 16th century. A portrait of Andrew/Hasmodai from 1581 was found in Romania by Radcliffe. In his current incarnation, he was known as Teo and lived in Otorad. He and Tarlant also express their desire to have a little bit of fun every now and then, which leads to them taking Wanda out on something of a joy ride and consequently being punched in the face by Agi. The series special ending shows him returning home to be reunited with his older sister, Serena.
Tarlant (タルラント, Taruranto) Voiced by: Asami Yaguchi (Japanese)
The one who created Wanda (Wonder), a large robot with a mind of its own. Not much is known about his life on earth besides the fact that he once had a dog named Baron. His name on earth was Kalie, and he lived in West Silies. Like the other children, he tries to put up a serious (and at times snippy) front, acting like he can handle himself without anybody's help, but it becomes clear that he just wants to return to his old life on Greecia like the rest of them or, if that's not possible, live a peaceful life on earth. He is the first of the Befort Children to meet Tohma, who bumps into him while searching for Helga and then fights him on Kokkuri Island. The series Special Ending showed his return to his father and a dog named Wonder (like the robot).
Mel (メル, Meru)
The second to leave the Befort Children's group, although she leaves because she loses her memories. After Palza's departure, she secretly arranges to be reincarnated before the others, in order to see Conrad Rugen (Palza) as a man. She is older than the others, she reaches the age of memory loss before the rest of the group. In her next incarnation, either as a result of her previous action or from weakness at losing Palza, she loses her memory early again. This is when Dumas finds them standing over the deceased Serafine (Tina's incarnation), and because she refuses to escape with people she can't remember, Mel is captured by one of Dumas' men. When the events of Fantastic Children take place she has been reincarnated as Dr. Gherta Hawksbee (ゲルタ・ホークスビー, Geruta Hōkusubī), born on August 17, 1960, in German Khartoum. She graduated from the Rennep-Gymnasium in 1973, after which she attended and did post-graduate work at the Ludwig-Maximilians-Universität München. She became the director of the GED organization at the age of 23, and she uses both Conrad's old notes and the scientists from Greecia's findings, through her current life as Gherta continues to torment from her previous life's memories at Dumas' hands wherever she goes. Unlike Conrad, Gherta/Mel does eventually regain her memories (with Soreto's help) and in the end uses the GED organization to aid the children. Though Conrad died long before Gherta's time, she feels attracted to the idea of him because she was Mel and he was Palza and that bond hasn't gone away.
Voiced by: Maaya Sakamoto (Mel), Yuki Kaida (Gherta) (Japanese)
Palza (パルザ, Paruza)
The first Befort Child to drop out; unlike Mel, he does it of his own free will. On Earth, he was born Conrad Rontgen (コンラート・ロンチェン, Konrāto Ronchun) (Rugen), with one younger brother. When Agi and co. confront him and try to get him to join them once more, he breaks down, telling them what they did back then was wrong and he wants to be able to live a peaceful life once more. After this, he loses his memories of Greecia and becomes Conrad entirely. However, he does not lose his love of science and does remember some of their findings, which led him to discover X-Rays on earth. He also retains his feelings for Mel. When she sees him as Conrad, she can't help feeling somehow attached to him somehow. Back in Greecia, the two of them were engaged and would've gotten married shortly after Tina's own wedding, had Georca not launched an attack on the palace. His discovery is used by the GED organization to use Orsel to send people into the land of the dead several years later.
Voiced by: Chihiro Suzuki (Palza), Naomi Shindou (Conrad) (Japanese)

=== Detectives ===
Cooks (クックス; Kukkusu) Voiced by: Shinpachi Tsuji
Nguyen Hue Cooks is a policeman on the trail of the Befort Children. Cooks is supposed to be investigating the case of the missing child, Flo (Soreto), but he notices that the photos of Flo, and several other children who went missing at the same time, bear a striking resemblance to a photo his grandfather took of the Befort Children 100 years ago. He does run into the children several times, but they are unresponsive to his questions. When he meets them in the GED organization's lab, he starts trying to spy on Gherta and her team as well.
Alice (アリス; Arisu) Voiced by: Yuuko Sumitomo
Alice Holingworth was sent from the main department of the Federal Law Enforcement Agency to review Cooks' progress on a case investigating a missing child, Flo (Soreto), as he had not presented a report to them in some time. Alice is unwittingly dragged into Cooks' actions in hunting down the Befort Children and his attempts to unravel the mystery behind GED.

=== GED Organization ===
Duma (Damien) (デュマ（デミアン）, Deyuma (Demian)) Voiced by: Eiji Hanawa
Seemingly to the audience, he is the villain of Fantastic Children, but as the story unfolds, he is nothing more than a pawn controlled by his father, Georca. On Greecia, he was Tina's younger half-brother, the son of her mother and Georca. After Georca's plan to take control of the throne fails and Tina is sent to earth as a reincarnation, Georca forces Duma to search for her. Though the two have never met, Duma has often seen her preserved body and vows to find her on Earth to return her to her former self. He despises the Befort Children, whom he feels are to blame for the whole incident, but he eventually realizes that the path he has chosen is wrong and rebels against Georca.
Kirchner (キルヒナー, Kiruhinā; Voiced by: Ken Narita)
One of several test pilots used as guinea pigs by the GED Group to test out The Zone. When his body enzymes break down and cause him to age rapidly, he tries to rescue his blind sister, Cybele, from a couple and a perverted man who's been abusing her. In his anger, he releases Orsel (powerful emissions of his soul), which leads to the Children of Befort finding out that someone has stolen their data. Born 03-06-1985.
Thal Sinon
One of several test pilots used as guinea pigs by the GED Group to test out The Zone. She is found by Thoma, Helga and Chitto on Chikao Island while trying to escape from GED and visit her mother one last time. The Enma appears to her in the form of her dead sister. Born 09-22-1988.
Grass
One of several test pilots used as guinea pigs by the GED Group to test out The Zone. Grass returns home to Nohedge to give his daughter the seashells he had promised when he left home. He was 34 years old when he died in 2012, but he had been reported dead in 2009, and his body was allegedly buried in the Air Force cemetery in Hague. The Enma took the form of his dead mother, and is not only seen by Grass's wife, but is captured on videotape at the Nohedge police station.
Azada
A GED organization member (ostensibly another test pilot) was mentioned by Kirchner as having been killed by GED.
Gina
A GED organization member (ostensibly another test pilot) was mentioned by Kirchner as having been killed by GED.

=== Inhabitants of Greecia ===
Soran (ソラン) Voiced by: Wataru Hatano
The leader of the royal army in Greecia. Because of an explosion he was in as a child, parts of his body are actually metal (when they first meet, Tina calls him "kamen no oniichan," or "the boy with the mask"). Tina first meets him as a child, and he helps her find her way back when she loses her way in the woods. Later in life, he befriends Sess and eventually meets the princess again when she is 16. Although Tina and Sess are arranged to be married, she falls in love with Soran instead; her feelings for him are so strong that when the Orsel levels in her body go out of control, only Soran can restore her back to herself, which unfortunately causes Sess to become very jealous that Tina chose Soran over him. Later, Soran tells Tina that he will meet her again on Earth when her spirit is transferred, but before he can send Tina's soul to Earth himself, he is shot and killed by a jealous Sess, who later realizes a terrible mistake and apologize deeply to Soran for his wrongful betrayal. Because of his death, Soran did not arrive on Earth, though it was hinted that, like Sess; Soran was near the Orsel that causes his soul to be reincarnated onto Earth, possibly in Christina's time as her student Arnon and in Serafine's time as Jim. Soran's modern reincarnation later appeared at the end of the anime, where he meets with a 21-year-old Helga and are finally reunited once more.
Titas (タイタス) Voiced by: Tamio Ōki
The King of Greecia. He was once a kind and benevolent ruler, but after Tina's death, he turns mad and orders the Befort Children to find her on Earth. It is not known what he does while the events of Fantastic Children take place.
Georca (ゲオルカ, Georuka) Voiced by: Tetsuo Kamura
Titas' younger brother, who wants the throne for himself and attempts to take it by force. He tries to take everything Titus has and loves, first the queen and then the princess, Tina. His plans are put on hold when Tina is sent to Earth in another body; her body eventually becomes a very dangerous weapon. He wants to use her powers against Titas to claim the throne. However, he meets his end at the hands of Duma.
Gotō (ゴトー) Voiced by: Hitoshi Bifu
Titas' trusted friend and advisor.
Reda (レダ) Voiced by: Mayumi Asano
Tina's mother.

=== Other characters ===
Father (とうちゃん, Tō-chan) Voiced by: Toru Ohkawa
Tohma's father.
Mother (かあちゃん, Kā-chan) Voiced by: Yuki Kaida
Tohma's mother.
Director of the Institute (施設の院長, Shisetsu no Inchō) Voiced by: Hiroaki Hirata
Director of the institute.
Dr. Radcliffe (ラドクリフ博士, Radokurifu-hakase) Voiced by: Takashi Matsuyama
A famous scientist who lived before the events of Fantastic Children takes place. He is featured in the very first scene of the series. Though he was once a well-respected man, he eventually loses his sanity trying to unravel the mystery of the Befort Children and loses credibility. Detective Cooks' grandfather was a good friend of the scientist; it was his picture that spurred him to try to find out more about the mysterious, white-haired children.
Enma
Agi describes Enma as a God of the Universe that seeks to maintain and restore balance in the universe. It is not made clear if Enma is a single entity or not; however it can appear as a large number of dark cylindrical forms. Enma's main role, as presented by the series, is to keep each soul where it belongs, preventing it from either going to different zones or remaining alive when it should not. Since the Befort Children are in violation of the universal balance, Enma constantly attacks them, using illusions to coax them into returning to their original everyday lives.
