= Tamio Ōki =

Japanese voice actor (1928–2017)

- 大木 民夫
- Born: January 2, 1928; Tokyo, Empire of Japan
- Died: December 14, 2017 (aged 89)
- Occupation: Voice actor
- Years active: 1946–2016
- Agent: Mausu Promotion

Tamio Ōki (大木 民夫, Ōki Tamio; January 2, 1928 – December 14, 2017) was a Japanese voice actor. He was affiliated with Mausu Promotion.

== Filmography ==
=== Anime ===
List of voice performances in anime
Year	Title	Role	Notes	Source
1968–71	Star of the Giants	Shigeru Suzuhara		
1970	Ashita no Joe	Gouhei Oigawa		
1970	Akaki Chi no Eleven	Rinkichi Tamai		
1973	Karate Master	Narrator		
1974	Hoshi no Ko Chobin	Burunga		
1975	Dog of Flanders	Cozets		
1975	Time Bokan	Dr. Franken	Ep. 35	
1977	Chōdenji Machine Voltes V	Duke Zaki, Professor Sakunji		
1977	Lupin the Third Part II	Various characters	Ep. 5, 15, 60, 76, 95, 104, 122	
1978	The Story of Perrine	Pietro Fanfani	Ep. 9 - 10	
1978	Tosho Daimos	General Sakamori Miwa		
1978	Invincible Steel Man Daitarn 3	Commander Beltlee	Ep. 28	
1979	Hana no Ko Lunlun	Italian two-Earl イタリアンニ伯爵	Ep. 48	
1979	Mirai Robo Daltanious	Kureitasu クレイタス	Ep. 21	
1979	The Ultraman	Heller		
1979	Tondemo Nezumi Daikatsuyaku: Manxmouse	Mr. Petten		
1980	The Rose of Versailles	Minister Necker	Ep. 36	
1980	Space Warrior Baldios	Baad	Ep. 9	
1980	Fumoon	Dr. Frankenstein		
1980	Astro Boy	Dr. Tenma, Gore		
1980	Space Battleship Yamato III	Furaken	Ep. 14 - 15	
1980	Ashita no Joe 2	Mikinosuke Shiraki	Eps. 1 - 3, 11, 13, 21, 36, 40 - 44	
1981	The Swiss Family Robinson: Flone of the Mysterious Island	Ernest Elliott	Ep. 50	
1981	Belle and Sebastian	Detective Carrera		
1981	Urusei Yatsura	Sugawara no Michizane	Ep. 210	
1981	The Year Without a Santa Claus	Doctor		
1982	Acrobunch	Black army demon-Guroiji 黒軍鬼・グロイジ		
1982	The Mysterious Cities of Gold	Metonaru メトナル		
1982	Space Cobra	King Zeke	Ep. 21	
1983	Lady Georgie	Capitan	Ep 7-34	
1983	Cat's Eye	Nagaishi		
1984	Lupin III Part III	Sir Wave	Ep. 42	
1985	Dream Hunter Rem	Mephisto		
1985	Sanguozhi	Jiang Gan 蒋幹		
1985	Musashi no Ken	Hyōe Furusawa 古沢兵衛		
1985	Button Nose	Anchor アンカー		
1986	Uchūsen Sagittarius	Gozetto	Ep. 62 - 64	
1986	Amon Saga	Darai Sem		
1987	City Hunter	Dr. Fritz Lang		
1987	Esper Mami	Goichi Minakami	Ep. 82	
1987	Zillion	Mayer		
1987	Space Fantasia 2001 Nights	Leo / work supervision レオ/作業監督	OVA	
1988	Tatakae!! Ramenman	Ka-Tar		
1988	Appleseed	Nereus	OVA	
1988	Gunbuster	Captain Tashiro		
1989–92	Lupin III specials	Rooster; Martin Beck; Rasuputon	Ep. "Bye-Bye Liberty - Close Call! / Crisis" "Steal Napoleon's Dictionary!" "From Russia with Love / Bank of Liberty"	
1989	City Hunter 3	Thoreau		
1989	The Laughing Salesman	platinum 白金		
1990	Record of Lodoss War	Wort		
1990	Musashi, the Samurai Lord	Narrator		
1990	The Hakkenden	Yoshizane Satomi	OVA	
1991	Shizukanaru Don – Yakuza Side Story	President	OVA	
1991–93	The Heroic Legend of Arslan	Narrator	OAV	
1992	Choudendou Robo Tetsujin 28 Go FX	Dr. Miller		
1993	The Irresponsible Captain Tylor	Ghost	Ep. 12	
1995	Juuni Senshi Bakuretsu Eto Ranger	Large Reijin goal 大霊神ゴール	Ep. 36, 38	
1995	El-Hazard	Dr. Schtalubaugh		
1996	The Vision of Escaflowne	Aston	Ep. 6 - 8, 20	
1997	Eat-Man	Admiral Alexander		
1997	Flame of Recca	Genjuro		
1997	Ehrgeiz	Narrator		
1997	Berserk	King	Ep. 5, 7 - 9, 15, 17	
1998	Legend of the Galactic Heroes	Lazar Lobos		
1998	Tekken: The Motion Picture	Dr. Bosconovitch	OVA ep. 2	
1998	Cowboy Bebop	Yurt パオ	Ep. 21	
1998	Shadow Skill	Narrator, others		
1998–99	Master Keaton	Marcus (ep. 1), Douglas (ep. 30)	Ep. 1, 30	
1999	Monster Rancher	Gigi ジジ		
1999	Hoshin Engi	Genshi Tenson		
1999	Reign: The Conqueror	Antipater		
1999	Steel Angel Kurumi	General	Ep. 1 - 3, 6, 15, 18, 24	
1999	Karakurizōshi Ayatsuri Sakon	Hideaki Kujo		
2000	Hidamari no Ki	Senzaburō Ibuya	Ep. 1 - 2, 5, 7, 9, 25	
2000	Saiyuki	Elder	Ep. 10	
2000	Hamtaro	One tree teacher 一本木先生	Ep. 123	
2000	Inuyasha	Hermit	Ep. 52	
2001	Beyblade	Kogorō Daitenji		
2001	Noir	Old bartender	Ep. 5	
2001	The Legend of Condor Hero	Shuuhakutsuu		
2002	Beyblade V-Force	Great Chairman		
2002	Lupin III Episode 0: First Contact	Hans Darahaido ハンス・ダラハイド		
2002	Haibane Renmei	Washi	Ep. 3, 9 - 13	
2002	Gold Muscle ja:ゴールドマッスル	Dr. Steve Borkin		
2002	Macross Zero	Nutouki	OVA	
2003	Beyblade G-Revolution	Great BBA Chairman		
2003	Ashita no Nadja	Shopkeeper	Ep. 41	
2003	Pluster World	Elder 長老	Ep. 3, 47	
2003	Ninja Scroll	Genza		
2003	Detective School Q	Masaomi Yuge 弓削雅臣	Ep. 36 - 39	
2003	Cromartie High School	Jiiya じいや	Ep. 20	
2003	Mermaid Saga	Eijiro	Ep. 10 - 11	
2003	Gungrave	Sid Gararude シド・ガラルデ	Ep. 8 - 9	
2003	Gilgamesh	Chairman 議長	Ep. 14	
2003	Uninhabited Planet Survive!	Survive		
2004	Phoenix	Houben 法弁		
2004	Monster	Erich Fortner エーリッヒ・フォルトナー	Ep. 5 - 6	
2004	Agatha Christie's Great Detectives Poirot and Marple	Halliday ハリデイ	Ep. 25 - 26	
2004	Desert Punk	Narrator, Kaoru Kaizuka		
2004	Fantastic Children	King Titas	Ep. 16 - 19	
2004	Black Jack	Yamadano-sensei	Ep. 1, 51	
2005	Gallery Fake	Master	Ep. 25	
2005	Gaogaigar Final: Grand Glorious Gathering	Pei la Kain	Ep. 9 - 12	
2005	Eureka Seven	Kengo, Kuzemi ケンゴー/クゼミ		
2005	Angel Heart	Professor Mutō	Ep. 44 - 46	
2006	Kage Kara Mamoru!	Daian Kagemori	Ep. 11 - 12	
2006	Kiba	Zico		
2006	Utawarerumono	Waabe	Ep. 7, 21, 23	
2006	Black Jack 21	Boccherini	Ep. 1	
2006	009-1	Bart	Ep. 7	
2007	Dinosaur King	Elder	Ep. 31	
2007	El Cazador de la Bruja	Larco	Ep. 21	
2007	Claymore	Boniface	Ep. 15	
2007	Shigurui	Syume Sudou	Ep. 11	
2008	Porphy no Nagai Tabi	Abbot 修道院長	Ep. 35	
2008	Golgo 13	Albert	Ep. 33	
2008	Nijū Mensō no Musume	Kawakyo 河居	Ep. 1	
2008	Hell Girl: Three Vessels	Risaburo Ashiya (old)	Ep. 17	
2008	Mōryō no Hako	Kenjiro Yamakawa	Ep. 5	
2009	Viper's Creed	Fuyuhiko		
2009	The Tower of Druaga: The Sword of Uruk	Director 院長	Ep. 4	
2009	Tatakau Shisho: The Book of Bantorra	Kachua = Biinhasu カチュア=ビーインハス	Eps. 1, 4, 9, 11,13 - 15, 18 - 22, 25	
2010	Ōkami Kakushi	Jūzō Kushinada	Ep. 5 - 6, 8 - 12	
2011	Nichijou	King Alberto	Ep. 7	
2011	Fate/Zero	Cormac Mac Airt	Ep. 9	
2011	Rurouni Kenshin: New Kyoto Arc	Nenji Kashiwazaki	OVA	
2012	Moyashimon Returns	Big shot 大物	Ep. 6	
2012	From the New World	Mushin	Ep. 1, 4, 21	
2012	JoJo's Bizarre Adventure	Tonpeti	Ep. 6 - 8	
2013	Uta no Prince-sama	Masato's grandfather	Season 2 Ep. 4	
2014	Space Dandy	Grandpa	Ep. 5	
2014	Black Bullet	Kikunojo Tendo	Ep. 1, 4	
2015	Rokka: Braves of the Six Flowers	Atoro Spycar	Ep. 6	

=== Film ===
List of voice performances in film
Year	Title	Role	Notes	Source
1981	Space Warrior Baldios	King Bird		
1982	Techno Police 21C	Man of pipe パイプの男		
1982	Future War 198X	McCoy General Staff Headquarters マッコイ総合参謀本部長		
1986	Project A-ko	Earth Defense Headquarters Chief		
1986	Amon Saga	Dalai Sem		
1987	Wicked City	Hotel owner		
1991	Mobile Suit Gundam F91	Sio Fairchild, Roy Jung		
1991	Nadia: The Secret of Blue Water	Dr. Alberto Wooler		
1991	The Heroic Legend of Arslan	Narrator		
1991	Roujin Z	Prof. Tachibana		
1993	Doraemon: Nobita and Tin-Plate Labyrinth	Burikin		
1995	Ghost in the Shell	Daisuke Aramaki		
1996	Dragon Quest Retsuden: Roto no Monshō	Voice of lithograph 石版の声		
2000	Jin-Roh: The Wolf Brigade	Capo Officer		
2004	Ghost in the Shell 2: Innocence	Daisuke Aramaki		
2009	Eureka Seven: Good Night, Sleep Tight, Young Lovers	Kuzemi-Suwaigado / swordsman クゼミ・スワイガード/ケンゴウ		
2009	The Garden of Sinners: A Study in Murder – Part 2	Shiki's grandfather		
2011	Children Who Chase Lost Voices	Old man from Amaurot		
2011	Friends: Mononoke Shima no Naki	Elder		
2012	Wolf Children	Yamaoka		
2012	Fairy Tail the Movie: The Phoenix Priestess	Elder		
2013	Hal	Tokio		
2016	Planetarian: Hoshi no Hito	Hoshi no Hito		

=== Drama CDs ===
List of voice performances in audio dramas
Year	Title	Role	Notes	Source
2006	Venus Versus Virus	Sōichirō Nahashi		

=== Video games ===
List of voice performances in film
Year	Title	Role	Notes	Source
1993	Devil Hunter Yohko ~ Distant call ~	Ghat ガート		
1996	El-Hazard	Sutorerubau Dr. ストレルバウ博士	SS	
1997	Langrisser I & II	Kossel priest, King Ilzack	PS1/PS2	
1998	Xenogears	Captain	PS1/PS2	
1998	Jade Cocoon: Story of the Tamamayu	Chieftain two 族長ニ	PS1/PS2	
2000	Gunparade March	Buta ブータ	PS1/PS2	
2000	Doraemon 3: Makai no Dungeon	Ketone / aldehyde ケトン/アルデヒド	PS1/PS2	
2001	Onimusha	Girudensutan ギルデンスタン	PS1/PS2	
2001	Harry Potter and the Philosopher's Stone	Albus Dumbledore	PS1/PS2/PC	
2002	Harry Potter and the Chamber of Secrets	Albus Dumbledore	PS1/PS2/PC	
2003	Onimusha Blade Warriors	Girudensutan ギルデンスタン	PS1/PS2	
2003	Kitaro Ibun specter Kitan no Kitaro ゲゲゲの鬼太郎異聞妖怪奇譚	Daidarabotchi ダイダラボッチ	PS1/PS2	
2004	Fu-un Shinsengumi	Narrator	PS1/PS2	
2004	Onimusha 3	Girudensutan ギルデンスタン	PS1/PS2	
2004	Harry Potter and the Prisoner of Azkaban	Albus Dumbledore	GBA/PS2/PC	
2005	Gunbuster	Captain Tashiro Tatsumi	PS1/PS2	
2005	Harry Potter and the Goblet of Fire	Albus Dumbledore	PSP/NDS/GBA/PS2	
2006	Utawarerumono games	Wabe ワーベ	Also Portable in 2009	
2008	Harry Potter and the Order of the Phoenix	Albus Dumbledore	Wii/PS3/PS2/PSP/PC	
2008	White Knight Chronicles	Durham Grand Duke ダラム大公	PS3	
2009	Arc Rise Fantasia	Elliott	Wii	
2009	Ōkami Kakushi	Jūzō Kushinada	PSP	
2009	Harry Potter and the Half-Blood Prince	Albus Dumbledore	NDS/PS3/Xbox/PS2/PC	
2009	Uncharted 2: Among Thieves	Carl Schaefer カール・シェーファー	PS3	
2010	Kingdom Hearts: Birth by Sleep	Magic Mirror	PSP	
2010	White Knight Chronicles II	Durham Grand Duke ダラム大公	PS3	
2010	Class of Heroes 2G	Vacherin ヴァシュラン	PS3	
2011	Harry Potter and the Deathly Hallows – Part 1	Albus Dumbledore	PS3/Wii/PC	
2011	Harry Potter and the Deathly Hallows – Part 2	Albus Dumbledore	NDS/PS3/Wii/PC	
2012	Ciel nosurge	Causal コーザル		
2013	Air Conflicts: Vietnam	Lyndon B. Johnson		
2016	World of Final Fantasy	Ramuh		

=== Tokusatsu ===
1967

- The X from Outer Space (Dr. Berman (Actor by Franz Gruber)

1976

- Choujin Bibyun (Sakasabashira (ep. 16))

1998

- Tetsuwan Tantei Robotack (Master Ranking)

2008

- Engine Sentai Go-onger (Savage Water Barbaric Machine Beast Pot Banki (ep. 14))

=== Dubbing roles ===
List of voice performances in overseas productions (Live-action)
Title	Role	Voice dub for	Notes	Source
12 Monkeys	Dr. Goines	Christopher Plummer		
The 6th Day	Dr. Griffin Weir	Robert Duvall	2002 NTV edition	
Amores perros	El Chivo	Emilio Echevarría		
Bill & Ted's Excellent Adventure	Abraham Lincoln	Robert V. Barron		
Bill & Ted's Bogus Journey	Death	William Sadler		
Charlie and the Chocolate Factory	Grandpa Joe	David Kelly	2008 NTV edition	
Child's Play 2	Haskell Sullivan	Peter Haskell		
Child's Play 3	Haskell Sullivan	Peter Haskell		
The Count of Monte Cristo	Abbé Faria	Richard Harris		
Crazy Heart	Wayne Kramer	Robert Duvall		
The Crucible	Judge Thomas Danforth	Paul Scofield		
Cube 2: Hypercube	Colonel Thomas H. Maguire	Bruce Gray		
Dave	Bob Alexander	Frank Langella		
Duck, You Sucker!	Dr. Villega	Romolo Valli		
Dune	Padishah Emperor Shaddam IV	José Ferrer		
The Empire Strikes Back	Palpatine		1986 NTV edition	
The Fifth Element	Vito Cornelius	Ian Holm		
Game of Death	Dr. Land	Dean Jagger		
Gandhi	1st Baron Irwin	John Gielgud		
Get Smart	Siegfried	Terence Stamp	2011 TV Asahi edition	
Gladiator	Marcus Aurelius	Richard Harris		
Goldfinger	Mr. Solo	Martin Benson	1978 NTV edition	
A Good Year	Uncle Henry	Albert Finney		
The Great Escape	Ramsey	James Donald	1971 Fuji TV edition	
Gremlins 2: The New Batch	Doctor Catheter	Christopher Lee		
Harry Potter and the Deathly Hallows – Part 1	Gellert Grindelwald	Michael Byrne		
The Horse Soldiers	Col. Phil Secord	Willis Bouchey	1973 NET edition	
Hostile Waters	Admiral Chernavin	Max von Sydow		
House on Haunted Hill	Fredrick Loren	Vincent Price		
I, Robot	Dr. Alfred Lanning	James Cromwell		
Indiana Jones and the Last Crusade	Walter Donovan	Julian Glover		
John Q.	Lt. Frank Grimes	Robert Duvall		
K-19: The Widowmaker	Admiral Bratyeev	John Shrapnel		
Kramer vs. Kramer	Jim O'Connor	George Coe		
Lawrence of Arabia	Turkish Bey	José Ferrer	1981 TV Asahi edition	
The Long Kiss Goodnight	Dr. Nathan Waldman	Brian Cox		
Lucky Break	Graham Mortimer	Christopher Plummer		
Mac and Me	Zimmerman	Ivan J. Rado		
The Majestic	Stan Keller	James Whitmore		
Men in Black II	Chief Zed	Rip Torn		
Minority Report	Director Lamar Burgess	Max von Sydow		
Near Dark	Loy Colton	Tim Thomerson		
Ocean's Eleven	Saul Bloom	Carl Reiner		
Ocean's Twelve	Saul Bloom	Carl Reiner		
Police Academy films	Eric Lassard	George Gaynes		
Quiz Show	Mark Van Doren	Paul Scofield		
The Reptile	Dr. Franklyn	Noel Willman		
Salem's Lot		James Cromwell		
Scooby-Doo 2: Monsters Unleashed	Jeremiah Wickles	Peter Boyle		
Scrooged	Lew Hayward	John Forsythe		
Sherlock Holmes and the Deadly Necklace	Sherlock Holmes	Christopher Lee		
Shooter	Michailo Serbiak	Rade Šerbedžija		
Sneakers	Cosmo	Ben Kingsley		
Some Like It Hot	"Spats" Colombo	George Raft		
Suspiria	Professor Milius, Narrator	Rudolf Schündler	1986 TV Tokyo edition	
Syriana	Dean Whiting	Christopher Plummer		
Troy	Priam	Peter O'Toole		
Tucker: The Man and His Dream	Bennington			
The Unseen				
The Usual Suspects	Kobayashi	Pete Postlethwaite		
Wanted	Pekwarsky	Terence Stamp		
The X-Files	Alvin Kurtzweil	Martin Landau		
X-Men	Professor Charles Xavier (Professor X)	Patrick Stewart		
X2	Professor Charles Xavier (Professor X)	Patrick Stewart		
X-Men: The Last Stand	Professor Charles Xavier (Professor X)	Patrick Stewart		
X-Men: Days of Future Past	Professor Charles Xavier (Professor X)	Patrick Stewart		

List of voice performances in overseas productions (Animation)
Title	Role	Notes	Source
Batman: The Animated Series	Emile Dorian		
Big Hero 6	Fred's father		
House of Mouse	Magic Mirror		
Mickey and the Beanstalk	Ludwig Von Drake	BVHE edition	
Robots	Mr. Gasket		
Rudolph's Shiny New Year	Big Ben		
Shrek 3	Merlin		
Snow White and the Seven Dwarfs	Magic Mirror		
Tarzan	Professor Porter		
Tarzan & Jane	Professor Porter		
Up	Charles Muntz		
