= One Missed Call =

One Missed Call may refer to:

- One Missed Call (2003 film), a Japanese horror film, followed by two sequels
- One Missed Call (2008 film), an American remake of the Japanese film
- One Missed Call (TV series), a Japanese television horror drama based on the film
- One Missed Call (manga), a manga based on the Japanese film, published in the U.S. by Dark Horse Comics
- One Missed Call, a 2011 mixtape by Add-2

== See also ==
- Missed call, a telephone call that is not answered by its intended recipient
- Missed Call (film), a 2005 Indian film
- Missed Call (TV series), a 2026 British television series
- Miss Call, a 2021 Indian film by Ravi Kinagi
