= Kōji Ueno =

Japanese composer and musician

Kōji Ueno (上野 耕路, Ueno Kōji; born February 1, 1960 in Chiba city) is a Japanese composer, musician, arranger and keyboardist. He is noted for his unique style of music.

He graduated from Nihon University's department of music at its faculty of art, and in 1978, began his career in music with his first music ensemble, 8&1/2, after which he worked with the group Halmens between 1979 and 1981. In 1980, Ueno formed the musical group Guernica, noted for its unique form of avant garde music, along with vocalist Jun Togawa and lyricist Keichi Ohta.

In the 1980s, Ueno worked with Akira Ifukube or Ryuichi Sakamoto on the soundtracks of the films Koneko Monogatari, Oritsu Uchūgun - Oneamisu no Tsubasa, and The Last Emperor. In 2004, he composed the music for the lauded Takashi Nakamura-directed anime television series, Fantastic Children.

Ueno formed the musical group Netszo & Gansaku with the first album, Polarity Integration by Sony Music in April 2007.

Ueno has also lectured on film music at the Faculty of Art at Nihon University. He has won several awards, including the award for best musical composition at the 1989 Mainichi Film Festival for his composition of the musical score for the film Untama Giru, and has also won numerous international awards, including the best music at the Festival Des Trois Continents in Nantes in 1989, as well as the "Cristal tcheque pour la musique contemporaine" at the 32nd Golden Prague International Television Festival in 1995, held in Prague, for his score for the NHK television series, The Pale Cast of Thought.

== Compositions ==
- Koneko Monogatari (1986, composition and arrangement)
- Untama Giru (1989, music)
- Teito Taisen (1989, music)
- Réservoir (1991, composition and arrangement)
- Gadget: Invention, Travel, & Adventure (1993, music)
- Edogawa Ranpo Gekijō: Oshie to Tabi-suru Otoko (1994, music)
- Mugen Ryūkyū Tsuru Henrī (1999, music)
- -Less (2001, music)
- Fantastic Children (2004, music)
- Tarako, Tarako, Tarako (2004, a TV advertisement song for Q.P.'s Tarako Pasta Sauce, sung by Kigurumi in CD)
- Imabikisō (2007, sound)
- Helter Skelter (2012, music)
- Maestro! (2015, music)
- Louder!: Don't See What You Are Singing (2018, music)
- Last Winter, We Parted (2018, music)
