= Gō Takamine =

Gō Takamine (高嶺 剛, Takamine Gō, born 12 November 1948 in Ishigaki, Okinawa Prefecture) (sometimes credited as Tsuyoshi Takamine) is an Okinawan director of fiction films, documentaries and experimental films. Born on Ishigaki Island and raised in Naha, Takamine went to university in Kyoto and there began making 8mm films. He made his feature film debut with Paradise View (1985) and won a number of awards for Untamagiru (1989), including the Caligari Film Award at the Berlin Film Festival, the best feature film award at the Hawaii International Film Festival, the Golden Montgolfiere at the Three Continents Festival, and the Hochi Film Award. That film also earned him the Directors Guild of Japan New Directors Award. Other works include the feature-length video Tsuru-Henry (1998) and documentaries on Okinawan performers such as Rinshō Kadekaru. His films have centered on the politics of Okinawan history and cultural identity, particularly by using the Okinawan language, music and folk legends.

== Selected filmography ==
- Okinawan Dream Show (オキナワン ドリーム ショー, 1974)
- Okinawan Chirudai (オキナワン チルダイ, 1978)
- Paradise View (パラダイスビュー, 1985)
- Untamagiru (ウンタマギルー, 1989)
- Tsuru-Henry (夢幻琉球・つるヘンリー, 1998)
- Hengyoro (変魚路, 2016)
