= Untamagiru =

- Original film poster

Japanese name
- Kana: ウンタマギルー
- Directed by: Gō Takamine
- Written by: Gō Takamine
- Produced by: Natsuki Hariu
- Starring: Kaoru Kobayashi; Jun Togawa; John Sayles
- Cinematography: Masaki Tamura
- Edited by: Hiroshi Yoshida
- Music by: Kōji Ueno
- Production company: Parco
- Release date: October 7, 1989 (Japan)
- Running time: 120 minutes
- Country: Japan
- Language: Okinawan

Untamagiru (Okinawan: ウンタマギルー, Untamagiruu) is a 1989 Okinawan film directed by Gō Takamine. It is a magical realist story of the legendary Okinawan hero Untamagiru participating in efforts to form an independent Okinawa before the island was returned to Japan in 1972. Many of the characters speak in the Okinawan language and thus mainland Japanese spectators needed subtitles to understand it.

== Cast ==
- Chikako Aoyama
- Kaoru Kobayashi
- John Sayles
- Jun Togawa

== Awards and nominations ==
14th Hochi Film Award

- Won: Best Film
