= Nextworld =

Japanese manga series

- The cover to Volume 1 of the Osamu Tezuka Manga Complete Works edition

来るべき世界 (Kitarubeki Sekai)
- Genre: Science fiction
- Manga
- Written by: Osamu Tezuka
- Published by: Fuji Shobo
- English publisher: NA: Dark Horse Comics
- Published: 1951
- Volumes: 2
- Anime television film

Fumoon (フウムーン)
- Directed by: Hisashi Sakaguchi
- Produced by: Takamasa Matsutani; Toru Horikoshi; Touru Komori
- Written by: Osamu Tezuka; Hisashi Sakaguchi
- Music by: Yuji Ohno
- Studio: Tezuka Productions
- Original network: Nippon TV
- Released: August 31, 1980
- Runtime: 91 minutes

Next World (Japanese: 来るべき世界, Hepburn: Kitarubeki Sekai), also known as Nextworld, is a Japanese science fiction manga series, written and illustrated by Osamu Tezuka in 1951.

It is the third and final work in what is regarded as Osamu Tezuka's early science fiction trilogy, consisting of Lost World (1948), Metropolis (1949) and Nextworld (1951). Though they are separate, self-contained stories, they are often collected together in reprints.

== Plot ==
Created in a time when the Cold War was becoming hotter, Nextworld is Osamu Tezuka's parody of the tense relationship between the USA (represented as the 'Nation of Stars') and USSR (known in the work as the 'Uran Federation'). The main storyline focuses on atomic tests that create a race of mutant animals known as Fumoon, with psychic powers and intelligence beyond humans, who formulate a plan to evacuate hundreds of animals and a small group of people off the planet Earth. The reason for this is due to a large toxic cloud approaching the Earth, threatening to wipe out all life. Meanwhile, the two warring superpowers draw closer and closer to a confrontation.

== Fumoon ==
Fumoon (フウムーン) is a 1980 Japanese science fiction anime television film created for Nippon Television Network's annual 24-hour charity program, Ai wa Chikyū o Suku (愛は地球を救う; "Love Saves The Earth"). Its plot is based on Nextworld.

=== Plot ===
The anime film is similar, but omits characters from the manga. Another difference is that Kenichi (a character who also appears in the Metropolis manga and its anime adaptation) is a teenager in the film, whereas he is a child in the manga.

=== Cast ===
- Hiroki Suzuki as Kenichi Shikishima
- Junpei Takiguchi as Dr. Kagashi Yamadano
- Kaneto Shiozawa as Rock Clock
- Kenji Utsumi as Kei Gamata
- Kousei Tomita as Higeoyaji (Shunsaku Ban)
- Mari Okamoto as Rococo
- Minori Matsushima as Peach
- Chikao Ohtsuka as Lednof and Nikolai Rednov
- Hisashi Katsuta as Dr. Ochanomizu
- Ichirō Nagai as Notarian
- Kazuya Tatekabe as Tabasco
- Kenichi Ogata as Borokin
- Kumiko Takizawa as Cocoa
- Minoru Midorikawa as Suntory Whisky
- Ryoko Kinomiya as Mozu
- Shigezou Sasaoka as Gamata's Thug
- Tamio Ohki as Dr. Frankenstein

== See also ==
- List of Osamu Tezuka manga
  - Lost World (manga)
  - Metropolis (manga)
- List of Osamu Tezuka anime
- Osamu Tezuka
- Osamu Tezuka's Star System
