= Norihiro Inoue =

Japanese actor and voice actor (1958–2022)

- 井上倫宏
- Born: March 7, 1958; Kanagawa Prefecture, Japan
- Died: February 28, 2022 (aged 63)
- Education: Hosei University
- Occupation: Actor
- Years active: 1985–2022

Norihiro Inoue (Japanese: 井上 倫宏, Hepburn: Inoue Norihiro; March 7, 1958 – February 28, 2022) was a Japanese actor from Kanagawa Prefecture, Japan.

== Biography ==
He graduated from Hosei University in 1982, and soon after in 1985, began acting in numerous TV dramas, anime television series, and stage plays.

Inoue died of esophageal cancer on February 28, 2022, at the age of 63.

== Filmography ==
=== TV drama ===
- Sanada Taiheiki (1985, NHK Shin Ōgata Jidaigeki, as Kimura Shigenari)
- Taiheiki (1991, NHK Taiga Drama, as Shijiyu Takasuke)
- Tokugawa Yoshinobu (1998, NHK Taiga Drama, as Inaba Masakuni)
- Aoi Tokugawa Sandai (2000, NHK Taiga Drama, as Kajyūji Kōtoyo)
- Love Complex (2000, Fuji TV)

=== Theatre ===
- Pisaro (1985, PARCO Gekijō)
- Higeki Fēdoru (1986, Engeki Shūdan)
- Kana te Dehon Chūshingura (1990, Tōho)
- Bara to Kaizoku (1996, Engeki Shūdan)
- Yūrei (1997, Engeki Shūdan + Kinokuniya Southern Theatre)
- Électre (2002, Engeki Shūdan)
- Rupture (2007, Engeki Shūdan)

=== Anime television series ===
- Code Geass - Lelouch of the Rebellion (2006) (Schneizel El Britannia)
- School Rumble ni Gakki (xxxx) (Tenma and Yakumo's father/Narration)
- Detective School Q (xxxx) (Dengaku Shimada)
- Chikyū Bōei Kigyō Dai-Guard (xxxx) (Eijirō Sakurada)
- Negima?! (xxxx) (Takahata T. Takamichi)
- Hanada Shōnen-shi (xxxx) (Takeshi Murakami)
- Harukanaru Toki no Naka de ~Hachiyō Shō~ (xxxx) (Emperor)
- PEACE MAKER Kurogane (xxxx) (Keisuke Yamanami)
- Mahō Sensei Negima (xxxx) (Takahata T. Takamichi)
- Detective Conan (xxxx) (Masaru Ōta)
- Yamiyo no Jidaigeki (xxxx) (Nobunaga Oda, Hanzō)
- Kipper (xxxx) (Kipper)
- Rosario+Vampire (xxxx) (Bus Driver)
- Master Keaton (1998) (Taichi Hiraga-Keaton)
- Kindaichi Case Files (1999) (Morio Wada)
- Fruits Basket (2001) (Kazuma Sohma)
- Gunslinger Girl (2003) (Marco)
- The World is Still Beautiful (2014) (Aki)

=== Anime films ===
- MARCO: Haha wo Tazunete Sanzenri (1999) (Marco as an adult)
- Metropolis (2001) (Atlas)
- Harukanaru Toki no Naka de ~Maihitoyo~ (2006) (Emperor)

=== OVA ===
- Master Keaton (1998) (Taichi Hiraga-Keaton)
- Ginga Eiyū Densetsu (2000) (Alfred Rosas (young))

=== Dubbing roles ===
- Agent Carter (Edwin Jarvis (James D'Arcy))
- Avengers: Endgame (Edwin Jarvis (James D'Arcy))
- American Beauty (Brad Dupree (Barry Del Sherman))
- The Art of More (Arthur Davenport (Cary Elwes))
- Batman Begins (2007 NTV edition) (Carl Finch (Larry Holden))
- The Big Lebowski (VHS/DVD edition) (Jesus "Da Jesus" Quintana (John Turturro))
- Boardwalk Empire (Dr. Valentin Narcisse (Jeffrey Wright))
- Bridget Jones's Baby (Mark Darcy (Colin Firth))
- Bridget Jones's Diary (Mark Darcy (Colin Firth))
- Bridget Jones: The Edge of Reason (Mark Darcy (Colin Firth))
- Close Encounters of the Third Kind: The Final Cut (Claude Lacombe (François Truffaut))
- Das Experiment (Berus (Justus von Dohnányi))
- The Day the Earth Stood Still (Dr. Michael Granier (Jon Hamm))
- Edges of the Lord (Gniecio (Olaf Lubaszenko))
- ER (Mark Greene (Anthony Edwards))
- Exit Wounds (Matt Montini (David Vadim))
- Firewall (Bill Cox (Paul Bettany))
- Gandhi (Mahatma Gandhi (Ben Kingsley))
- Gattaca (Jerome Eugene Morrow (Jude Law))
- The Genie from Down Under (Bruce)
- Gone with the Wind (Ashley Wilkes (Leslie Howard))
- The Happening (Julian (John Leguizamo))
- Iron Man (Ho Yinsen (Shaun Toub))
- Iron Man 3 (Ho Yinsen (Shaun Toub))
- Jason X (Professor Brandon Lowe (Jonathan Potts))
- The Last Song (Steve Miller (Greg Kinnear))
- Lethal Weapon (Captain Brooks Avery (Kevin Rahm))
- Lock, Stock and Two Smoking Barrels (Eddie (Nick Moran))
- O Brother, Where Art Thou? (Pete Hogwallop (John Turturro))
- Oscar and Lucinda (Oscar Hopkins (Ralph Fiennes))
- Playing by Heart (Roger (Anthony Edwards))
- Predestination (The Bartender/Temporal Agent (Ethan Hawke))
- Seven Pounds (Ezra Turner (Woody Harrelson))
- Star Trek: Enterprise (Malcolm Reed (Dominic Keating))
- There's Something About Mary (Ted Stroehmann (Ben Stiller))
- Thunderbirds (Brains (Anthony Edwards))
- Tokyo Trial (Radhabinod Pal (Irrfan Khan))
- Twilight (Carlisle Cullen (Peter Facinelli))
