= Metropolis (2001 film) =

2001 anime film directed by Rintaro

- Theatrical release poster
- Directed by: Rintaro
- Screenplay by: Katsuhiro Otomo
- Based on: Metropolis by Osamu Tezuka
- Produced by: Masao Maruyama; Iwao Yamaki
- Starring: Yuka Imoto; Kei Kobayashi; Kōsei Tomita; Norio Wakamoto; Junpei Takiguchi; Masaru Ikeda; Takaya Hashi; Toshio Furukawa; Shigeru Chiba; Masashi Ebara; Takeshi Aono; Shun Yashiro; Norihiro Inoue; Kōki Okada; Taro Ishida
- Cinematography: Hitoshi Yamaguchi
- Music by: Toshiyuki Honda
- Production company: Madhouse
- Distributed by: Toho (Note: TriStar Pictures handled theatrical distribution to the film in the US and other territories with a co-distribution with Destination Films.)
- Release date: May 26, 2001
- Running time: 113 minutes
- Country: Japan
- Language: Japanese
- Budget: ¥1.5 billion
- Box office: ¥100 million (Japan); $4 million (worldwide)

Metropolis (Japanese: メトロポリス, Hepburn: Metoroporisu) is a 2001 Japanese animated cyberpunk drama film loosely based upon Osamu Tezuka's 1949 manga of the same name. The film was directed by Rintaro, written by Katsuhiro Otomo, and produced by Madhouse, with conceptual support from Tezuka Productions.

== Plot ==
In the plutocratic city of Metropolis, humans co-exist with robot laborers designed to build and maintain the city. However, its impoverished human citizens discriminate against robots, blaming them for their unemployment and being forced to live in the squalid lower levels of Metropolis.

Duke Red, Metropolis's wealthiest citizen, celebrates the completion of a massive military/scientific complex, the "Ziggurat". His adopted son, Rock, leads a paramilitary organization known as the Marduks, tasked with destroying malfunctioning and rogue robots - including those that escaped from their designated zones in the lower city. Meanwhile, Japanese detective Shunsaku Ban and his young nephew, Kenichi Shikishima, have traveled to Metropolis to apprehend rogue scientist Dr. Laughton, wanted for organ trafficking and animal rights violations. Unbeknownst to Shunsaku, Red hired Laughton to secretly build a highly advanced android, modeled and named after his deceased daughter Tima. He intends to have her become the central control unit for a powerful nuclear superweapon hidden at the top of the Ziggurat, which he will use to conquer the world. Rock learns of Tima's existence, and jealously shoots Laughton and sets his laboratory ablaze.

Discovering the burning lab, Shunsaku locates the dying Laughton, who directs Shunsaku to a notebook containing his research. Meanwhile, Kenichi stumbles upon the newly activated Tima. The two fall into the sewers and are separated from Shunsaku. As they search for a way back to the surface, the pair grow close as Kenichi protects Tima and her humanity evolves, both unaware that she is a robot. Learning that Tima is alive, Rock and his subordinates hunt the pair.

Kenichi and Tima encounter a resistance movement of disgruntled humans, who stage an armed revolution against Metropolis's leaders and robot workers. Unhappy with the Duke's influence, the nation's president and Metropolis's mayor conspire with the revolutionaries to seize power. However, the president's top military commander, General Kusai Skunk, betrays them to Red and has them assassinated. Red imposes martial law and ends the revolution. The kids reunite with Shunsaku, but Rock finds them and attempts to kill Tima. Red intervenes, disowning Rock and discharging him from the Marduks before taking Tima and Kenichi away.

Determined to kill her and regain his father's affection, Rock kidnaps Tima, but Shunsaku incapacitates him and rescues her. Following instructions from Laughton's notebook, Shunsaku has her tap into the Ziggurat's computer mainframe and they discover Kenichi being held in the Ziggurat. Red and the Marduks capture them and bring everyone to the top of the Ziggurat, where Red reveals Tima's true purpose and introduces her "throne", the control system for the superweapon. Disguised as a maid, Rock shoots Tima in the chest, exposing her internal circuitry before being wounded by Red's men.

Horrified by her true identity, Tima goes insane, causing her implanted programming to take control. She physically integrates with the throne and begins ordering robots around the world to destroy humanity as punishment for abusing them. Robots all across Metropolis assault the Ziggurat; while the others flee, Kenichi reaches Tima and eventually separates her from the throne. Still possessed by her hostile programming, Tima tries to kill Kenichi. Rock triggers an overload in the superweapon, killing himself and Red in a massive explosion. As the Ziggurat collapses and spreads destruction to the rest of Metropolis, Tima's programming deactivates and she falls, suspended by a cable on her arm. Kenichi tries to pull her up; Tima's memories of Kenichi resurface and she asks him "Who am I?", before her hand slips and she falls to the ruins far below.

In the aftermath, survivors emerge from the ruins, and Kenichi discovers robots have salvaged some of Tima's parts. While Shunsaku departs Metropolis, Kenichi chooses to remain behind. A photograph shown during the end credits reveals that Kenichi eventually rebuilds Tima and opens a robot workshop bearing their names.

== Differences between the manga and anime ==
Tezuka's original manga centers around the artificial humanoid Mitchi, who can fly and change sex. She is pursued by Duke Red and his Red Party, who intend to use Mitchi for destructive purposes. Shunsaku Ban and his nephew Kenichi find Mitchi after her creator, Dr. Charles Laughton, is killed, and protect her as they search for her parents. Where in the film, Tima's desires to be human, the cause for Mitchi's destructive rampage which takes place in the manga's climax is the revelation that, as a robot, she has no parents.

The 2001 film incorporates more elements from the Fritz Lang film Metropolis. When making the original Metropolis manga, Tezuka said that the only inspiration he got from Fritz Lang's Metropolis was a still image from the film where a female robot was being born. In addition to adopting set designs from the original film, the 2001 film has more emphasis on a theme of pervasive class struggle in a dystopian, plutocratic society and expands it to examine the relationship of robots with their human masters. (This relationship was explored by Tezuka in great detail in the series Astro Boy.) Mitchi is replaced by "Tima", who is permanently female and cannot fly. In this version, Kenichi is an assistant to his uncle and forms a strong friendship with Tima even though neither know she is artificial. Tima's relationship with Kenichi ends when Tima accepts her identity as a robot over that of a female human, which triggers a robot revolution.

The character of Rock was invented for the film. According to the writer of the film, the character was added to pay homage to Tezuka's science fiction adventure style of storytelling, while also adding depth to the story's background. Rock is meant to represent humanity's dark side, and the negative emotions associated with those aspects. He also echoes Tima's story and can be considered her foil, as they are both neglected children engineered by their father to be tools of war. Duke Red adopted Rock, but does not consider him his son, and Rock is cast aside and unwanted by Duke Red. Similarly, Tima is a replacement for Duke Red's real daughter (also named Tima), but he commissioned the robot Tima's creation purely for use as a weapon, and has no affection for her. Their stories ultimately converge, coming full circle when they both lead to their father's downfall, with his legacy literally collapsing to the ground.

The film's Ziggurat combines the New Tower of Babel from Lang's original film and the manga's Cathedral.

== Themes ==
=== Portrayal of robots ===
The Shinto religion delineates between the animate and inanimate. Shinto kami can be spirits, humans, objects, or in this case, robots. Therefore, robots are viewed favorably in both the manga and the film, but especially in the film, where there is a nearly equal number of robot and human characters. Most humans, like Kenichi and Shinsaku Ban, tend to sympathize with robots, casting the Marduks and their hostility toward robots as antagonistic.

== Cast ==
Character name	Japanese voice actor	English dubbing actor
Tima (ティマ)	Yuka Imoto	Rebecca Forstadt
Kenichi Shikishima (敷島 ケンイチ, Shikishima Kenichi)	Kei Kobayashi	Brianne Siddall
Rock (ロック)	Hiroaki Okada	Michael Reisz
Duke Red (レッド公)	Tarô Ishida	Jamieson Price
Shinsaku Ban (伴俊作, Ban Shinsaku)	Kōsei Tomita	Tony Pope
Pero (ペロ)	Norio Wakamoto	Dave Mallow
Doctor Laughton (ロートン博士)	Junpei Takiguchi	Simon Prescott
Doctor Ponkotsu (ポンコッツ博士)	Takeshi Aono	Doug Stone
President Boone (ブーン大統領)	Masaru Ikeda	Richard Plantagenet
Supt. Notarlin (ノタアリン)	Shun Yashiro	William Frederick Knight
Kusai Skunk (スカンク)	Toshio Furukawa	Dan Woren
Acetylene Lamp (アセチレン・ランプ)	Shigeru Chiba	Steven Blum
Ham Egg (ハムエッグ)	Masashi Ebara	Robert Axelrod
Mayor Lyon (リヨン)	Takaya Hashi	Peter Spellos
Atlas (アトラス)	Norihiro Inoue	Scott Weinger
Fifi (フィフィ)	Rikako Aikawa	Rikako Aikawa
Emmy (エンミィ)	Mami Koyama	Barbara Goodson

== Production ==
Osamu Tezuka had originally derived inspiration from Fritz Lang's 1927 German silent science fiction film of the same name, despite not actually having seen it. The manga and Lang's film do not share plot elements. The 2001 film borrows from Lang's film more directly and incorporates plot elements from it.

During the days of Mushi Productions, Hayashi asked Tezuka if he wanted to let him make a feature based on the manga, but immediately rejected the idea.

The film took five years to create. It had a production budget of ¥1.5 billion, then equivalent to roughly 9 million dollars. This made it the most expensive anime film up until then, surpassing Otomo's Akira (1988). In turn, its budget record was later surpassed by Otomo's Steamboy (2004).

== Soundtrack ==
Metropolis – Original Soundtrack

Soundtrack album by Toshiyuki Honda
- Released: May 23, 2001
- Genre: Film score
- Length: 59:10
- Label: King Records
- Producer: Toshiyuki Honda

The Metropolis soundtrack consists mainly of New Orleans-style jazz music and orchestral score composed by Toshiyuki Honda. It features Atsuki Kimura's cover of "St. James Infirmary Blues", and the ending theme is "There'll Never Be Good-Bye" by Minako "Mooki" Obata. The soundtrack album is available through King Records.

During the climax of the film, the collapse of the Ziggurat, the song "I Can't Stop Loving You" performed by Ray Charles is the only thing audible, with sound effects only reappearing later on in the scene. Likely due to licensing reasons, the song was not included on the soundtrack album.

== Release ==
The film was first released in Japan on May 26, 2001. When it was released in the US and other foreign countries by TriStar Pictures and Destination Films, it made a total of $4,035,192 (equivalent to $7,220,000 in 2025) in overseas territories outside of Japan. In the United States, the film was given a PG-13 rating by the MPAA for "violence and images of destruction" and a TV-14-LV rating when it aired on Adult Swim. It was also one of the first anime films to be submitted for consideration for Best Animated Film at the Academy Awards.

Metropolis was first released on VHS, and is now available in North America as both a 2-disc DVD, with the second disc being a MiniDVD (called a "Pocket DVD"), and a Blu-ray.

In both the United Kingdom and Ireland, Eureka Entertainment acquired the film's distribution rights as a means to release the film on Blu-ray in both countries. The UK and Ireland Blu-rays were released on January 16, 2017.

Toho-Towa Distribution, the foreign film distribution division of the film's original Japanese distributor, Toho, also handled the Japanese distribution of the 1927 version of Metropolis.

As the license of the German Metropolis is held by the Friedrich Wilhelm Murnau Foundation, the film was released under the title Robotic Angel in Germany.

== Reception ==
Metropolis received highly positive reviews: based on 67 reviews from Rotten Tomatoes, Metropolis received an overall 87% approval rating, with an average rating of 7.30/10. The site's critical consensus states that "A remarkable technical achievement, Metropolis' eye-popping visuals more than compensate for its relatively routine story." Metacritic assigned the film a weighted average score of 75 out of 100, based on 16 critics.

Film critic Roger Ebert, writing for the Chicago Sun-Times, gave Metropolis four out of four, calling it "one of the best animated films I have ever seen".

== See also ==
- Osamu Tezuka
- Osamu Tezuka's Star System
