= Kneuklid Romance =

Japanese visual kei rock band

- Kneuklid Romance in 1994. From left: Tatsuya, Gaz, Yukino, Juna, and Kenichi.

Background information
- Origin: Japan
- Genres: Rock; J-pop
- Years active: 1992–2000; 2019–present (Note: One-off reunions in 2009, 2011, 2012, and 2018)
- Labels: Infinity Records; VAP; Under Code; Production; Bricks Record
- Members: Yutaka; Kenichi; Takuya; Tatsuya; Kaede
- Past members: K; Yukino; Tetsu; Juna; Kami; Gaz; Kyo
- Website: kneuklid-romance.com

Kneuklid Romance (Japanese: ニュークリッドロマンス) were a Japanese visual kei rock band founded in 1992.

== History ==
Kneuklid Romance was formed in September 1992 by guitarist Tetsu and vocalist K, with guitarist Kenichi and bassist Tatsuya originally only support members. Drummer Kami completed the lineup. Kenichi said there was little discussion amongst the members and none of them could write songs, so he ended up taking control. K left the band within a couple months of its formation, and Yukino joined as the new vocalist in December. In 1993, Kami left the band to join Malice Mizer, and former Malice Mizer drummer Gaz became Kneuklid Romance's support drummer in his place. Gaz became an official member of the band in early 1994, after playing support for them for a year. Tetsu also left the band, and was replaced on guitar by Juna in May. The band's first album Puzzle was released in September 1994 with this lineup, which remained consistent until the end of 1995, when Yukino and Juna both seceded. After a hiatus of six months, the band returned in June 1996 with new vocalist Yutaka and new guitarist Takuya.

Kneuklid Romance's first release with this new lineup was the album 「Chain」・・・ in November 1996. The band made their major debut with mini album LINK, released on March 1, 1998. In May of 1998, they released the single "Shiawase ni Dekiru Kenri" (しあわせにできる権利), which was used as an ending theme for Japan Professional Football League broadcasts on Television Saitama. Drummer Gaz left the band in June of the same year, and Scud, the last work he participated in with Kneuklid Romance, was released a month later. Kyo joined as support drummer in his place, and officially joined the band in November of the same year. In 1999, they released singles "Tameiki" (ため息) and "Tsuki to Kimi to Boku no Kankei" (月と君と僕の関係), which were used as ending themes for the anime Master Keaton. Their third full-length album Babylonian Dance was released in March 1999, and their fourth full-length album Rainbow was released the following year. Following their "Over the Rainbow" tour, the band disbanded in May 2000.

The band temporarily reunited in 2009 with Gaz back on drums and released the single "Shine", in addition to holding a one-day comeback concert. They held two more of these concerts in 2011 and 2012 respectively, but with guest vocalists standing in for Yutaka, whom the band had lost contact with. Following the death of drummer Gaz in 2017, the band held a memorial concert in 2018.

In 2019, the band announced their full revival, with Yutaka returning to vocals and Kaede as the new drummer. With this lineup, they released the single "Fallin' Down" in 2020. On September 15, 2023, the band announced an indefinite suspension of activity following a concert on October 29, 2023.

== Members ==
Current members

- Yutaka – vocals
- Kenichi – guitars
- Takuya (拓也) – guitars
- Tatsuya – bass
- Kaede (カエデ) – drums

Former members

- K – vocals
- Yukino (雪乃) – vocals
- Tetsu – guitars
- Juna – guitars
- Kami – drums
- Gaz – drums
- Kyo – drums

== Discography ==
Studio albums

- 『Puzzle』 (『パズル』; 1994)
- 「Chain」・・・ (1996)
- Babylonian Dance (1999)
- Rainbow (2000)

Extended plays

- Love Song (1993)
- LINK (1998)
- Scud (1998)

Singles

- "Shiawase ni Dekiru Kenri" (しあわせにできる権利; 1998)
- "Heaven's Door" (1998)
- "Tameiki" (ためいき; 1999)
- "Tsuki to Kimi to Boku no Kankei" (月と君と僕の関係; 1999)
- "Shine" (2009)
- "Fallin' Down" (2020)
