= Master Keaton =

Japanese manga series and its adaptation(s)

- First tankōbon volume cover, featuring Taichi Keaton

MASTERキートン (Masutā Kīton)
- Genre: Adventure; Mystery; Thriller
- Manga
- Written by: Naoki Urasawa; Hokusei Katsushika; Takashi Nagasaki
- Illustrated by: Naoki Urasawa
- Published by: Shogakukan
- English publisher: NA: Viz Media
- Imprint: Big Comics
- Magazine: Big Comic Original
- Original run: 1988 – 1994
- Volumes: 18
- Anime television series
- Directed by: Masayuki Kojima
- Produced by: Hiroshi Yamashita; Michiru Ōshima; Manabu Tamura; Masao Maruyama
- Written by: Tatsuhiko Urahata
- Music by: Kuniaki Haishima
- Studio: Madhouse
- Licensed by: NA: Geneon
- Original network: Nippon TV
- Original run: Season 1 October 6, 1998 – March 30, 1999; Season 2 (direct-to-video); June 21, 1999 – June 21, 2000
- Episodes: 39
- Manga

Master Keaton Remaster
- Written by: Takashi Nagasaki
- Illustrated by: Naoki Urasawa
- Published by: Shogakukan
- Imprint: Big Comics (regular edition); Big Comics Special (deluxe edition)
- Magazine: Big Comic Original
- Original run: March 19, 2012 – August 20, 2014
- Volumes: 1
- icon

Master Keaton (Japanese: MASTERキートン, Hepburn: Masutā Kīton) is a Japanese manga series created by Hokusei Katsushika, Naoki Urasawa, and Takashi Nagasaki. It was serialized in Big Comic Original from 1988 to 1994, with its 144 chapters collected into 18 tankōbon volumes by Shogakukan. In North America, Viz Media licensed the manga for English release.

An anime adaptation was created by Madhouse, with 24 episodes airing from 1998 to 1999 in Japan on Nippon Television. An additional 15 episodes were created and released as original video animations (OVAs), bringing the total to 39 episodes. The anime and OVA series were dubbed into English and released in North America by Pioneer Entertainment from 2003 to 2004. Naoki Urasawa and Takashi Nagasaki created a sequel to the series, titled Master Keaton Remaster. Set 20 years after the original series ended, it ran in Big Comic Original from 2012 to 2014 and was collected into a single volume.

By 2014, Master Keaton had over 20 million copies in circulation.

== Plot ==
The story revolves around Taichi Hiraga-Keaton, the son of Japanese zoologist Taihei Hiraga and well-born Englishwoman Patricia Keaton. Keaton's parents separated when he was five, and young Taichi moved back to England with his mother. As an adult, he studied archeology at Oxford University, in part under the tutelage of Professor Yuri Scott. At Oxford, Keaton met and later married his wife, who was a mathematics student at Somerville College. The couple divorced years later, with Keaton leaving his five-year-old daughter Yuriko in her mother's care. After leaving Oxford, Keaton joined the British Army and became a member of the SAS, holding the post of survival instructor and seeing combat in the Falklands War and as one of the team members that responded to the Iranian Embassy siege. His combat training serves him in good stead as an insurance investigator for the prestigious Lloyd's of London where he is known for his abilities and his unorthodox methods of investigation. In addition to his work for Lloyd's, Keaton and his friend Daniel O'Connell operate their own insurance investigation agency headquartered in London. Even though Keaton is extremely successful as an insurance investigator, his dream is to continue his archaeological research into the possible origins of an ancient European civilization in the Danube river basin.

== Characters ==
Taichi Hiraga-Keaton (平賀=キートン・太一, Hiraga-Kīton Taichi)
Voiced by: Norihiro Inoue (Japanese); Ted Cole (English)
A British national who works as a freelance insurance investigator in London, and occasionally as a visiting lecturer at universities. However, his dream is to continue his archaeological research into the possible origins of an ancient European civilization in the Danube river basin. Keaton's parents separated when he was five and he grew up in Cornwall with his mother. He studied archeology at Balliol College, Oxford before joining the British Army and becoming a member of the Special Air Service (SAS), where he held the post of survival skills instructor and saw combat in the 1980 Iranian Embassy siege and the 1982 Falklands War.
Yuriko Hiraga (平賀百合子, Hiraga Yuriko)
Voiced by: Houko Kuwashima (Japanese); Kelly Sheridan (English)
Keaton's 15-year-old daughter. Keaton met Yuriko's Japanese mother when she was studying mathematics at Somerville College, Oxford and they married while still students. The two divorced when Yuriko was five, just like Keaton's parents had done when he was the same age. Although a junior high school student, Yuriko is mature for her age and also has an interest in archeology.
Taihei Hiraga (平賀太平, Hiraga Tahei)
Voiced by: Ichirō Nagai (Japanese); William Samples (English)
Keaton's Japanese father who is a zoologist. He occasionally gets involved in his own investigative mysteries. His well-born English wife, Patricia Keaton, seems to have not cared about his womanizing ways, but they are separated. He has a pet Chow Chow–St. Bernard mix, Taisuke (太助), who has an extraordinary sense of smell, even for a dog.
Daniel O'Connell (ダニエル・オコンネル)
Voiced by: Shinpachi Tsuji (Japanese); Ross Douglas (English)
Keaton's business partner at the Keaton & O'Connell Assurance Investigating Office on Baker Street. The two started working together in 1982. In general, Daniel tends to stay at the office, while Keaton does the legwork.
Charlie Chapman (チャーリー・チャップマン)
Voiced by: Masashi Sugawara (Japanese); Paul Dobson (English)
Keaton's childhood friend who looked at him as a love rival over their mutual friend Deborah. Following his childhood dream to be Mike Hammer, he works as a private detective. Charlie's work occasionally sees him cross paths with his childhood rival. Although he tries to prevent Keaton from showing him up on the case, he never succeeds.

== Production ==
There is controversy over who wrote the stories for Master Keaton. Hokusei Katsushika is a pseudonym of manga story writer Hajime Kimura, who was also a co-writer of Golgo 13. Originally, Katsushika created the series' story, while Naoki Urasawa did the artwork. However, after Katsushika died of cancer in December 2004, Urasawa claimed in a May 2005 interview with Shūkan Bunshun that Katsushika eventually stopped work as a story writer due to a personal conflict with him, after which Urasawa alone created both story and art. Because of this, Urasawa demanded that Katsushika's name appear smaller than his on the manga's covers. Manga story writer Kariya Tetsu, who was a close friend of Katsushika and an influential figure at Shogakukan, opposed this action vehemently, which resulted in the discontinuation of the further publication of the manga by July 2005. In 2019, Urasawa said that he had the ideas for the characters and Master Keaton was very much based on that. He was also going to write the manga in addition to illustrating it, but because he was already writing Yawara!, the editorial team was concerned about a young artist being able to create both. They brought in story writers, but the stories they proposed did not match Urasawa's vision. So instead meetings were held to create stories for the manga. But eventually the editors changed, and these "intimate" meetings were no longer possible. This is when Urasawa took the lead on writing the stories. He said that for the last two volumes, it is fair to say he came up with the stories alone.

Jason Thompson reported that Viz Media considered translating Master Keaton for release in North America in the 1990s, but were "scared off" by the low sales of their release of Urasawa's earlier work, Pineapple Army.

Urasawa and Takashi Nagasaki began the sequel Master Keaton Remaster (MASTERキートン Reマスター, Masutā Kīton Rimasutā) in 2012. When asked why he went back to a series after so many years, Urasawa stated it was because with the original series he had a hard time making the story he wanted due to contractual obligation, and because people affected by the 2011 Tōhoku earthquake and tsunami said they had enjoyed the series, so he wanted to do something for them.

== Media ==
=== Manga ===
Master Keaton was serialized in Big Comic Original from 1988 to 1994. The 144 chapters were collected into 18 tankōbon volumes by Shogakukan between November 1988 and August 1994. A kanzenban edition of the series, including color pages, was published in 12 volumes between August 30, 2011, and June 29, 2012. During its initial magazine run and tankōbon release, Hokusei Katsushika was credited as its writer and Naoki Urasawa as its illustrator. The kanzenban reissue co-credits Katsushika and Takashi Nagasaki as the writers for the first five volumes, while Katsushika and Urasawa are co-credited as the writers from volumes six on. From 1989 to 1993, Katsushika and Urasawa serialized Keaton Animal Files (キートン動物記, Kīton Dōbutsuki) in special issues of Big Comic Original. The 14 chapters were collected into one tankōbon volume on March 28, 1995, which sees their original two-colored artwork turned into four-colors.

Naoki Urasawa and Takashi Nagasaki created a sequel to the series, titled Master Keaton Remaster. It was published irregularly in Big Comic Original from March 19, 2012, to August 20, 2014. The chapters were collected into a single volume on November 28, 2014, with a deluxe edition including the full color pages from the magazine run released the same day.

In 2014, Viz Media licensed Master Keaton for release in North America. Viz Media published the 12-volume kanzenban edition from December 16, 2014, to September 19, 2017.

==== Volumes ====
No.	Title	Japanese release date	Japanese ISBN
1	A Kahriman in Desert	November 30, 1988	978-4-09-181691-7
1. "Labyrinth Man" (迷宮の男, Meikyū no Otoko); 2. "Angelic Devil" (天使のような悪魔, Tenshi no Yōna Akuma); 3. "Small Blue Lady" (小さなブルーレディー, Chīsana Burū Ledi); 4. "David's Stone" (ダビデの小石, Dabide no Koishi); 5. "Hot Sands, Black and White" (黒と白の熱砂, Kuro to Shiro no Nessa); 6. "Qehriman of the Desert" (砂漠のカーリマン, Sabaku no Kāriman); 7. "Back Alley Education" (背中の裏街, Senaka no Ura Machi); 8. "Long-Ago Summer Pudding" (遥かなるサマープディング, Harukanaru Samā Pudingu)
2	The Hunting Season	April 28, 1989	978-4-09-181692-4
1. "A Journey with a Lady" (貴婦人との旅, Kifujin to no Tabi); 2. "Season of the Hunter" (狩人の季節, Kariudo no Kisetsu); 3. "Season of the Hunted" (獲物の季節, Emono no Kisetsu); 4. "Harvest Season" (収穫の季節, Shūkaku no Kisetsu); 5. "Fire & Ice"; 6. "A Rose-Colored Life" (薔薇色の人生, Barairo no Jinsei); 7. "Red Moon"; 8. "Silver Moon"
3	Message from Aлекcеев	July 29, 1989	978-4-09-181693-1
1. "Under the Roofs of Paris" (屋根の下の巴里, Yane no Shita no Pari); 2. "Little Big Man" (小さな巨人, Chīsana Kyojin); 3. "A Strange Tale of Lasagne" (ラザーニェ奇譚, Razānye Kitan); 4. "A Message from Alexeyev" (アレクセイエフからの伝言, Arekuseiefu Kara no Dengon); 5. "Flowers for Everyone" (すべての人に花束を, Subete no Hito ni Hanataba o); 6. "Black Forest" (黒い森, Kuroi Mori); 7. "An Early Afternoon Adventure" (昼下がりの大冒険, Hirusagari no Dai Bōken); 8. "The Woman in Red" (赤の女, Aka no On'na)
4	Dog Days	November 30, 1989	978-4-09-181694-8
1. "The Wall of Joy" (喜びの壁, Yorokobi no Kabe); 2. "Rules of Negotiation" (交渉人のルール, Kōshō Hito no Rūru); 3. "Rules of Ransom" (身代金のルール, Minoshirokin no Rūru); 4. "The Flying Hero" (空飛ぶヒーロー, Soratobu Hīrō); 5. "Fourteen Steps" (14階段, 14 Kaidan); 6. "A Peaceful Death" (穏やかな死, Odayakana Shi); 7. "A Long and Hot Day" (長く暑い日, Nagaku Atsui hi); 8. "A Family Moment" (家族の瞬間, Kazoku no Shunkan)
5	White Goddess	April 28, 1990	978-4-09-181695-5
1. "The White Goddess" (白い女神, Shiroi Megami); 2. "Charlie" (チャーリー, Chārī); 3. "The Neglected Body" (無関心な死体, Mukanshin'na Shitai); 4. "The Noel Cease-Fire" (ノエルの休戦, Noeru no Kyūsen); 5. "The Man Who Came from Hameln" (ハーメルンから来た男, Hāmerun Kara Kita Otoko); 6. "The Man Who Came to Hanover" (ハノーファーに来た男, Hanōfā ni Kita Otoko); 7. "The Man Who Came from Olomouc" (オルミュッツから来た男, Orumyuttsu Kara Kita Otoko); 8. "Master Keaton's Situation" (キートン先生の事情, Kīton Sensei no Jijō)
6	The False Tricolour	July 30, 1990	978-4-09-181696-2
1. "The Hidden Treasure" (秘めたる宝, Himetaru Takara); 2. "The Missing Blue Bird" (青い鳥消えた, Aoi Tori Kieta); 3. "White Snow and Noah's Ark" (白い雪とノアの箱舟, Shiroi Yuki to Noa no Hakobune); 4. "The Fake Tricolor Flag" (偽りの三色旗, Itsuwari no Sanshokuki); 5. "The Fake Union Jack" (偽りのユニオンジャック, Itsuwari no Yunion Jakku); 6. "Safehouse" (セーフハウス, Sēfuhausu); 7. "The People of Cat Manor" (化け猫荘の人々, Bake Neko Sō no Hitobito); 8. "The Thistle Coat" (アザミの紋章, Azami no Monshō)
7	The Forest of David Bobbid	November 30, 1990	978-4-09-181697-9
1. "Memories of Elsa Lanchester" (エルザ・ランチェスターの思い出, Eruza Ranchesutā no Omoide); 2. "Elsa Lanchester Returns" (エルザ・ランチェスターの復活, Eruza Ranchesutā no Fukkatsu); 3. "The Agate Time" (瑪瑙色の時間, Menou-iro no Jikan); 4. "The Scented Clue" (匂いの鍵, Nioi no Kagi); 5. "The Forest of David Bobbid" (デビッド・ホビッドの森, Debiddo Bobiddo no Mori); 6. "The Return of David Bobbid" (デビッド・ホビッドの帰還, Debiddo Bobiddo no Kikan); 7. "Dreams of a Golden Bell" (黄金の鍵の夢, Kogane no Kagi no Yume); 8. "No Exit" (出口なし, Deguchi Nashi)
8	The Leopard's Cage	April 27, 1991	978-4-09-181698-6
1. "The Leopard's Cage" (豹の檻, Hyō no Ori); 2. "The Eagle of Karun" (カルーンの鷲, Karūn no Washi); 3. "The Ants of Anatolia" (アナトリアの蟻, Anatoria no Ari); 4. "Scorpions of a Dead City" (死の都市の蟻, Shi no Toshi no Ari); 5. "Mice in a Well" (井戸の中の鼠, Ido no Naka no Nezumi); 6. "The High Road of Gambling" (賭けの王道, Kake no Ōdō); 7. "Forbidden Fruit" (禁断の実, Kindan no Mi); 8. "Santa from the West" (西からきたサンタ, Nishi Kara Kita Santa)
9	The Wind of Cornwall	July 30, 1991	978-4-09-181699-3
1. "The Code of Blood and Honor" (血と名誉の掟, Chi to Meiyo no Okite); 2. "The Law of Love and Sorrow" (愛と悲しみの掟, Ai to Kanashimi no Okite); 3. "The Winds of Cornwall" (コーンウォールの風, Kōnuōru no Kaze); 4. "The King's Tears" (王の涙, Ō no Namida); 5. "The Adventures of After-School Detectives" (放課後探偵団の冒険, Hōkago Tantei-dan no Bōken); 6. "A Vision of Highlands" (瞳の中のハイランド, Hitomi no Naka no Hairando); 7. "Love in May" (五月の恋, Gogatsu no Koi); 8. "Chateau Lajonchee 1944" (シャトー・ラジュンシュ1944, Shatō Rajonshu 1944)
10	Blue Friday	January 30, 1992	978-4-09-181700-6
1. "Behind the Mask" (仮面の奥, Kamen no Oku); 2. "The Green Fugue" (緑のフーガ, Midori no Fūga); 3. "The Curse of Isis" (イシスの祝い, Ishisu no Iwai); 4. "Blue Friday" (ブルーフライデー, Burū Furaidē); 5. "In the Shadow of Victory" (勝利の陰に, Shōri no Inni); 6. "Whisky Cat Village" (ウイスキーキャットの村, Uisukī Kyatto no Mura); 7. "The Prayer Tapestry" (祈りのタペストリー, Inori no Tapesutorī); 8. "Fortune with Rain" (幸運は雨と共に, Kōun wa Ame to Tomoni)
11	Both Wings of an Angel	June 30, 1992	978-4-09-182851-4
1. "Homecoming" (帰郷, Kikyō); 2. "The Angel's Wings" (天使の両翼, Tenshi no Ryōyoku); 3. "Faker's Miscalculation" (フェイカーの誤算, Feikā no Gosan); 4. "The Iron Fortress" (鉄の砦, Tetsu no Toride); 5. "Special Menu" (特別なメニュー, Tokubetsuna Menyū); 6. "Christmas Eve Encounter" (聖夜の邂逅, Seiya no Kaigō); 7. "Snowy-Mountain Judge" (雪山の審判, Yukiyama no Shinpan); 8. "Family" (家族, Kazoku)
12	Красный Ветер	November 30, 1992	978-4-09-182852-1
1. "Cheers to Catalonia" (カタルーニアに乾杯, Katarūnya ni Kanpai); 2. "Mad Sun" (狂った太陽, Kurutta Taiyō); 3. "An Investigator Is Born" (オプの生まれた日, Opu no Umaretahi); 4. "Eternal Elm" (永遠の楡の木, Eien no Nire no Ki); 5. "Crimson Wind" (赤い風, Akai Kaze); 6. "Scarlet Sadness" (赤き哀しみ, Akaki Kanashimi); 7. "To the Sky..." (空へ..., Sora e...); 8. "Shoes and Violin" (靴とバイオリン, Kutsu to Baiorin)
13	Knight of the Lion	May 29, 1993	978-4-09-182853-8
1. "Twilight of the Migratory Birds" (渡り鳥の黄昏, Wataridori no Tasogare); 2. "A Gift from the Dead" (死者からの贈り物, Shisha Kara no Okurimono); 3. "The Forest Where a God Lives" (神の棲む森, Kami no Sumu Mori); 4. "The Legendary Faint Smile" (伝説の微笑み, Densetsu no Hohoemi); 5. "Island of the Coward" (臆病者の島, Okubyōmono no Shima); 6. "Tom Bower and the Boy" (トム・バウワーと少年, Tomu Bauwā to Shōnen); 7. "Knight of the Lions" (ライオンの騎士, Raion no Kishi); 8. "Knight of the White Moon" (銀月の騎士, Gingetsu no Kishi)
14	An Inhabitant in the Sunless World	August 30, 1993	978-4-09-182854-5
1. "House of Roses" (バラの館, Bara no Yakata); 2. "The Heart's Walls" (心の壁, Kokoro no Kabe); 3. "Interview Day" (面接の日, Mensetsu no Hi); 4. "Man of the Tower" (塔の男, Tō no Otoko); 5. "What Makes a Good Pub" (いいパブの条件, Ī Pabu no Jōken); 6. "Happy New Year" (ハッピーニューイヤー, Happī Nyū Iyā); 7. "Resident of a Lightless World" (光なき世界の住人, Hikari Naki Sekai no Jūnin); 8. "The Woman Who Brought Light" (光をくれた女（ひと）, Hikari o Kureta On'na (Hito))
15	God-Given Village	January 29, 1994	978-4-09-182855-2
1. "The Immortal" (不死身の男, Fujimi no Otoko); 2. "Keaton the Home Tutor" (家庭教師キートン, Kateikyōshi Kīton); 3. "An Incident Among Women" (御婦人たちの事件, O Fujin-tachi no Jiken); 4. "Town of Truth" (真実の町, Shinjitsu no Machi); 5. "Detour" (寄り道, Yorimichi); 6. "Volunteer Detective" (探偵志願, Tantei Shigan); 7. "The Village That God Loved" (神の愛（め）でし村, Kami no Ai (Me) Deshi Mura); 8. "The Village of a Saint" (聖者のいる村, Seija no Iru Mura)
16	Sunset of Lunadale	April 28, 1994	978-4-09-182856-9
1. "The Sunset over Lunadale" (ルナデールの夕日, Runadēru no Yūhi); 2. "Two Fathers" (二人の父親, Futari no Chichioya); 3. "Return of the Super Sleuth?!" (名探偵再登場, Meitantei Sai Tōjō); 4. "Made in Japan I" (メイド・イン・ジャパンI, Meido in Japan Wan); 5. "Made in Japan II" (メイド・イン・ジャパンII, Meido in Japan Tsū); 6. "Made in Japan III" (メイド・イン・ジャパンIII, Meido in Japan Surī); 7. "Love from the Otherworld" (冥府からの愛, Meifu Kara no Ai); 8. "The Lost Genius Director" (失われた天才監督, Ushinawareta Tensai Kantoku)
17	The Day I Become a Scholar	June 30, 1994	978-4-09-182857-6
1. "Lost Beyond the Wall" (壁の忘れもの, Kabe no Wasuremono); 2. "The Final Challenge" (最後の挑戦, Saigo no Chōsen); 3. "Pact on Ben Tan Mountain" (ベンタヌ山の誓い, Bentaru-zan no Chikai); 4. "Judgment on the Mountain" (山の裁き, Yama no Sabaki); 5. "The Scholar's Day" (学者になる日, Gakusha ni Naru Hi); 6. "Successor to the Dream" (夢を継ぐ者, Yume o Tsugu Mono); 7. "A Very Busy Day" (本日多忙なり, Honjitsu Tabōnari); 8. "Prayers to Pass Exams" (合格祈願, Gōkaku Kigan)
18	A Digger for Dream	August 30, 1994	978-4-09-182858-3
1. "To Romania!!" (ルーマニアへ!!, Rūmania e!!); 2. "Ceaușescu's Children" (チャウシェスクの子供達, Chaushesuku no Kodomodachi); 3. "Escape from Bucharest!!" (ブカレスト脱出!!, Bukaresuto Dasshutsu!!); 4. "TA89"; 5. "Ceaușescu's Hidden Fortune" (チャウシェスクの隠し財産, Chaushesuku no Kakushi Zaisan); 6. "Village Massacre" (虐殺の村, Gyakusatsu no Mura); 7. "Desperation" (絶体絶命, Zettaizetsumei); 8. "Unearthing the Dream" (夢を掘る人, Yume o Horu Hito)

=== Anime ===
An anime adaptation covering a portion of the manga's select chapters aired from October 6, 1998, to March 30, 1999, in Japan on Nippon TV. The series was produced by Madhouse, Nippon Television, Shōgakukan and VAP and directed by Masayuki Kojima, with Tatsuhiko Urahata handling series composition, Kitarō Kōsaka designing the characters and Kuniaki Haishima composing the music. Originally consisting of 24 episodes, an additional 15 episodes were created and released as original video animations from June 21, 1999, to June 21, 2000, bringing the total to 39 episodes. The anime is narrated by Keaton Yamada.

The opening theme "Railtown" is by Kuniaki Haishima. The ending theme for episodes 1–13 is "Eternal Wind" by Blüe, "Tameiki" (ため息; 'A Sigh') by Kneuklid Romance for episodes 14–26, and "From Beginning" by Kuniaki Haishima for episodes 27–39. New ending themes were used for the anime's 2007 rebroadcast; "Tsuki to Kimi to Boku no Kankei" (月と君と僕の関係; 'Connection Between Me, You and the Moon') by Kneuklid Romance for episodes 1–13 and "Eber" by Blüe for episodes 14–24.

The anime and OVAs were licensed in North America by Pioneer Entertainment (later named Geneon), with an English dub produced by The Ocean Group. They released eight DVDs from June 10, 2003, to August 10, 2004.

== Reception ==
=== Manga ===
By November 2014, Master Keaton had over 20 million copies in circulation. On TV Asahi's Manga Sōsenkyo 2021 poll, in which 150,000 people voted for their top 100 manga series, Master Keaton ranked #49. Viz Media's release of Master Keaton was nominated in the "Best U.S. Edition of International Material—Asia" category two years in a row at the 2015 and 2016 Eisner Awards. The series was also included on the Young Adult Library Services Association's 2016 list of Great Graphic Novels for Teens.

Mark Sammut of Comic Book Resources praised Master Keaton as an "exhilarating adventure series" that "tackles weighty themes while generally maintaining an accessible tone through its endearing cast of characters and episodic nature". Jason Thompson called it a solid action-adventure series, whose "somewhat old-fashioned structure" reminded him of Golgo 13. Otaku USA's Joseph Luster claimed that with the series, Urasawa, Katsushika and Nagasaki "[weaved] a gripping tale of intrigue that bubbles and boils along with the best thrillers out there." He strongly praised Urasawa's art, saying that its story beats and transitions were "confidently executed", with it having "just the right amount of exposition [...] to make it all seem natural." Luster felt that Master Keaton had the potential to appeal to a wider audience than most manga available in English. In a review of the first English volume for Anime News Network, Rebecca Silverman called the premise of the book fascinating and its stories well-told, but felt the episodic nature of the chapters took away from its overall strength. She described the title character as "a bit like a dorkier Indiana Jones, hiding his badassery under a bad haircut and wrinkled suit" and cited him as a reason to read the series. Silverman speculated that Master Keaton is for mature readers looking for something more serious, as the "motivations of the characters is just as, if not more, important to the plot as the actual events themselves, and even though Urasawa's art is clear and clean, this is not a book you read quickly."

=== Anime ===
Hiromi Hasegawa of Ex.org praised the anime adaptation, saying that it "succeeded in capturing the atmosphere of the original and conveying that in a different media" while commenting that, when they were watching it, it felt like they were "reading a manga that moves and talks." They described the episodes, which often take place in Europe, as ranging from murder mysteries to anti-terrorist activities with occasional archaeological/zoological or family interests. Hasegawa noted that each episode has at least one action scene but explained that these serve as plot devices rather than focal points as the show's plot is "intensely dialogue-oriented". Although Hasegawa praised the art as beautiful and detailed, they had complaints with fluctuations in the animation quality. Hasegawa finished their review by recommending Master Keaton to mature audiences with more sophisticated tastes, and said they learned "quite a bit about political, historical, and ethnic situations in Europe as well as interesting theories in Archaeology or military techniques and weaponry" from the series.

Reviewing the anime for Anime News Network, Zac Bertschy described Master Keaton as a cross between a Tom Clancy novel and Matlock that defies all the conventions of anime and is clearly aimed at an older audience. Although calling the stories unique and interesting, he stated that the show never becomes gripping because they teeter "between exciting". Bertschy found the animation to be "competent but nothing special" and the English dub to be "a little on the silly side".
