= Lost World (manga) =

Japanese manga series

- The cover of Lost World

ロスト・ワールド<前世紀> (Rosuto Wārudo <Zenseiki>)
- Genre: Science fiction
- Manga
- Written by: Osamu Tezuka
- Published by: Fuji Shobo; Akita Shoten
- English publisher: NA: Dark Horse Comics
- Magazine: Konsoi Yoron Newspaper, Bōken Ō
- Published: December 20, 1948
- Volumes: 2

Lost World (ロスト・ワールド<前世紀>, Rosuto Wārudo - Zenseiki) is a manga series, written and illustrated by Osamu Tezuka in 1948. The story is partially based on The Lost World by Sir Arthur Conan Doyle.

It is the first work in what is regarded as Osamu Tezuka's early science fiction trilogy, consisting of Lost World (1948), Metropolis (1949) and Nextworld (1951). Though they are separate, self-contained stories, they are often collected together in reprints.

== Plot ==
A new planet begins to approach Earth. Scientists know nothing about the planet and decide to venture to it in order to discover its inhabitants and conditions. They discover that it is inhabited by dinosaurs and bears a resemblance to ancient Earth. The planet, named Mamango, broke off from Earth 5 million years ago and has come back for the first time since. The team soon discovers that criminals have stowed away on their space ship and that they have come to Mamango for their own devious reasons.

== Characters ==
Shunsaku Ban
A detective investigating a murder that is somehow linked to the mysterious Planet Mamango.
Kenichi Shikishima
A bright young boy who realizes the powerful potential of rocks from Planet Mamango.
Makeru Butamo
A captain who pilots the rocket ship built by Kenichi to the Planet Mamango for an exploratory expedition.
Sekken Kao
A criminal who seeks the power of Planet Mamango.
Doctor Jupiter
A character modelled after Popeye (in fact, there are several American cartoon characters present in this book, including Dagwood and Mickey Mouse).

== Inspiration ==
Osamu Tezuka's Lost World was partially based on Sir Arthur Conan Doyle's 1912 novel The Lost World, although it changed many of the novel's elements.

== Publication ==
In Japan, Lost World was published in two volumes by Fuji Shobo. The first had the subtitle "The Earth", and the second was subtitled "The Universe".

When the English adaptation was published in the United States on July 30, 2003, both books were combined into a single volume.

== See also ==
- List of Osamu Tezuka manga
  - Metropolis
  - Nextworld
- List of Osamu Tezuka anime
