= Metropolis (manga) =

Japanese manga

- Cover of the 1979 reprint

メトロポリス (Metoroporisu)
- Genre: Science fiction
- Manga
- Written by: Osamu Tezuka
- Published by: Ikuei Shuppan; Kodansha
- English publisher: NA: Dark Horse
- Published: September 15, 1949
- Volumes: 1

Metropolis (メトロポリス, Metoroporisu), also known as Osamu Tezuka's Metropolis or Robotic Angel (in Germany, due to an objection by the Friedrich Wilhelm Murnau Foundation), is a Japanese manga by Osamu Tezuka published in 1949. It is the second work in what is regarded as Osamu Tezuka's early science fiction trilogy, consisting of Lost World (1948), Metropolis (1949) and Nextworld (1951). It has been adapted into a feature-length anime, released in 2001. Though it has parallels to the 1927 film of the same name directed by Fritz Lang, Tezuka has stated that he had only seen a single still image of the film in a magazine at the time of creating his manga.

== Plot ==
The story begins with a scientist, Dr. Yorkshire Bell, noting that dinosaurs once flourished and became extinct when they advanced beyond their ability to adapt to change. Giant mammals, such as the saber-toothed tiger and the mammoth, came and went the same way. Humans, Earth's current dominant life form, had one special asset – intelligence – enabling them to advance further than all creatures before them. Dr. Bell wondered if, one day, humans might advance beyond the point of no return and render themselves extinct.

In the summer of 19XX, a bulletin reveals that a prolonged investigation by the United Nations Police has discovered a plot by a murderous secret society known as "The Red Party", led by master of disguise Duke Red, has infiltrated the International Scientists Conference held in Metropolis. While Duke Red orders his henchman to follow Dr. Charles Lawton, M.D., all the scientists notice that the Sun is now covered with sunspots, causing its radiation levels to rise. Lawton, back in his laboratory, had almost given up on his thirty-year experiment into synthetic cells (imitation eukaryotes composed of non-organic material and designed to mimic organic cells, in order for enough of them to be fashioned into true-to-life prosthetic organs and body parts) when he noticed the sunspots had irradiated his tank of synthetic proteins and brought them to life. So had Duke Red, who ordered Lawton to create an entire human body out of synthetic tissue, its face modeled after a marble statue and possessing several superpowers. Fearing his creation would be used for evil, Lawton brought it to life and destroyed his lab, making Duke Red believe their creation had been destroyed. In reality, Lawton had rescued the artificial human and was raising it as his own child in secret, thanks to some help from Dr. Bell. When "Michi" (his name) accidentally rendered its "father" unconscious and went out to play, he stopped a truck from running over a girl selling flowers. When the boy was mobbed by an awestruck crowd, another boy named Ken'ichi dragged him to the Dam Dharma Museum and the statue it was modeled after. They learned from the curator that it was called "The Angel of Rome", possessing the most beautiful face in the world - not knowing that Dharma himself was a member of the Red Party who supplied the statue to Duke Red.

The Red Party paid Lawton a visit, resulting in Lawton being mortally wounded, which was witnessed by Detective "Moustachio" from Japan who, unfortunately, had to release them because he had no arrest warrant. Lawton showed Moustachio a film telling the whole story of Michi's creation, as well as a journal detailing all of his powers. Arriving at his Japanese American relatives' home, he discovered his nephew, Ken'ichi, had brought home Michi. Revealing Lawton's death and true paternal status, Moustachio entrusted Michi to Ken'ichi's care while he consulted Superintendent General Notarlin of the Metropolis Police Department.

Notarlin introducing him to Police Inspector Ganimarl from France and Sherlock Holmes from England, Moustachio went with them to a monster sighting behind the Dharma Museum, where they were attacked by giant rats (which bear a striking resemblance to Mickey Mouse) and crashed into a fake tree which led Moustachio to the Red Party's underground headquarters. His presence discovered, Moustachio attempted to escape, aided by Fifi, one of the Red Party's slave robots, but was caught and Fifi destroyed. Duke Red revealed that the Red Party was developing a chemical weapon called Toron Gas as well as was responsible for the man-made sunspots, using a substance called omothenium (which intercepts gravity) to raise the Earth's temperature enough to melt the Antarctic ice cap in order to build their new headquarters upon the defrosted continent. Unable to get Moustachio to hand over Michi, the Red Party locks him in a chamber to become their first guinea pig.

Michi is introduced as a new student at Ken'ichi's junior high school, as well as Emmy, the violet-seller girl Michi had saved - unknown to the class, Emmy's schooling was being sponsored by a strange old man in exchange for luring Michi to her gangster older sister. At home, Ken'ichi accidentally discovered Dr. Lawton's journal revealing Michi as an artificial human with cybernetic 10,000 horsepower (7,500 kW) super-powers - including helium-induced flight, gills in his ears to breathe under water, and a gender-change button in his throat - which Ken'ichi tested successfully at home. At the Metropolis Police Department, Dr. Yorkshire Bell had been summoned by Notarlin to examine the giant rats scientifically named Mikimaus Waltdisneus and revealed that giant animals and vegetables were growing all over the world because of the sunspots. Holmes arrived to reveal Duke Red as responsible for the sunspots as well as his current disguise - the strange old man helping Emmy. Ganimarl tracked the man to Emmy's home, where the man was being held up for more money by her sister's gangster friends. Exposed, Duke Red gassed Ganimarl unconscious and left him in disguise for the police to find, and threatened Emmy's sister to deliver Michi to him.

Back at Red Party headquarters, Moustachio realized the Toron Gas hadn't been released because the rats had overrun the underground base. Disguising himself within the skin of one of the rats, Moustachio found the base's CPU and a short-circuited slave robot. Reactivating the robot, he ordered it to immediately destroy the CPU and then destroy the Red Party's food and water supplies at the right time, then played dead so Duke Red's henchman would dispose of the rat's corpse with him in it. Ken'ichi and Michi arrived at school to find the police questioning Emmy about whether her sister belonged to the Red Party. The other schoolchildren learned about Emmy's sister's criminal connection and attempted to expel her, but Michi saved her; Emmy returned the favor by telling Michi she knew the location of Michi's father, but she was abducted by a giant wasp. Michi saved her again and Emmy admitted to lying about Michi's father. Ken'ichi insisted Emmy stay in his house for protection, but her sister and her friends entered and demanded Ken'ichi bring Michi to them. He did, first activating Michi's gender switch; the gangster's left because they wanted Michi the boy, not the girl. After Ken'ichi informed Emmy of Michi's true nature, they discovered Michi had run away.

Moustachio arrived at the Metropolis Police Department to inform Notarlin and Ganimarl that Duke Red had been infiltrating the police to spy on them as Sherlock Holmes. Duke Red had the police arrest Notarlin and Ganimarl, having recruited more than half of them into the Red Party, and left Moustachio free, telling him Michi had escaped, and the Red Party had to pursue him. They used their mobile headquarters - the Atlantis, a 200,000-ton luxury liner - to hold Notarlin and Ganimarl while pursuing Michi, little knowing that girl-Michi had unknowingly stowed away onto the ship, was discovered, and recruited as a cabin girl. Michi discovered the crew's true identities and used the ship's radio to contact the police, who sent a search plane with Ken'ichi on board to find it. Michi was caught and admitted her name. When he mistook Duke Red to be her father, Duke Red revealed Michi's artificial nature and criminal purpose. As a result, Michi's mind snapped and he attacked the Red Party, the henchmen discovering he was also bulletproof. Confronting the Red Party's slave robots, Michi convinced them to destroy the food and water supply and scuttle the ship. The Red Party attempted to abandon ship but were arrested by Notarlin and Ganimarl, who escaped their cell in the confusion, and then thrown overboard by the robots. Notarlin and Ganimarl, having fled up the mast, watched as the robots condemned Duke Red to being incinerated in the ship's boiler, then were rescued by Ken'ichi's search plane.

The party were then downed by Michi and witness his declaration of war against the human race, marching towards Metropolis along the ocean floor. Unable to contact Moustachio because of the sunspots interfering with radio transmissions, they drifted towards Long Boot Island, where a surviving member of the Red Party told them the omothenium radiation emitter had created the sunspots but also enlarged all flora and fauna, his colleagues having been eaten by giant ants. Destroying the emitter, they saw the man-made sunspots disappear right before their eyes. Receiving warning of the robot army, Moustachio had the police declare martial law and move the populace to underground shelters. Dr. Bell warned Moustachio that a poisonous gas, which destroyed human brains to reduce them to animals, was being released; Moustachio recognized it as Toron gas. Michi and the robots having destroyed the Red Party's underground gas cylinders, and among the first victims were looters along with Emmy's sister.

Michi knocked down Metropolis' skyscrapers by hand while the slave robots took on the people on the ground. While the ordinary robots were easily dealt with, Ken'ichi attempted to reason with Michi, then challenge him using judo. When Michi gained the upper hand, his body started to smoke, and he fell off the roof. While the citizens wanted Michi's destruction, a broadcast by Dr. Bell informed them of Michi's mental breakdown due to Duke Red and that he was dying; because the sunspots were gone, their unique radiation which powered Michi's synthetic cells faded away, and his body was disintegrating. As everyone, including Michi's classmates, witnessed the end of science's greatest work of art, Dr. Bell reflected, as he had at the beginning of the story, if humanity's advancement was capable of engineering its self-destruction.

== Afterword ==
Osamu Tezuka noted that, after his breakthrough manga Shin Takarajima ("New Treasure Island") was released in 1947, Kansai was deluged by Osaka-made Akahon manga ("red book", due to the red ink used on the covers). Various publishing companies wanted to break away from the junk comic books and start releasing "real" books, so Tezuka proposed creating an epic, full-length science-fiction graphic novel.

Having only half a year to create a 160-page story, Tezuka assembled a basic plot from elements of unpublished work, the inspiration for the central character coming from a publicity still of the female robot from Metropolis (even though he had never seen the film or even known what it was about). When the manga was released, the response from the public was far greater than he imagined and that many students were inspired to become manga artists because of it.

The setting was based on pre-war Manhattan and Chicago, Emmy and her sister partly from Les Misérables, Michi's powers from Superman (perhaps, although Tezuka never made the connection between the title of his work and Superman's city), Michi's burning from The Invisible Ray, and Michi's death scene from The Monstrous Fellows of the Country Underground (another Tezuka manga from 1948).

The characters Duke Red and Notarlin made their debut in Metropolis, and both of them featured in later works. The character of Michi became the prototype for both the lead characters of Astro Boy and Princess Knight, neither of which may have come into existence without Michi (Michi even made a cameo as Hoshie Tenma, Astro Boy's mother).

== Cast ==
Due to Osamu Tezuka's Star System, some of his characters from other manga appeared in Metropolis, in different roles and with different names. Others appeared here for the first time but were later used by Tezuka in other manga.

- Michi as "Michi": The artificial humanoid created by Dr. Lawton to be used as a powerful weapon by the Red Party, but Michi is not aware of any of this.
- Ken'ichi Shikishima as "Ken'ichi": A good-hearted, but naive boy who becomes good friends with Michi, but after Michi turns against humanity, Ken'ichi has to see if he has to strength to fight his best friend.
- Shunsaku Ban as "Detective Moustachio": A detective on the search for Dr. Charles Lawton. As luck would have it, he is present when the Red Party guns down Dr. Lawton. Together with Ken'ichi, he uses his detective skills to try to find Michi's parents.
- Makeru Butamo as "Dr. Charles Lawton": A scientist hired by Duke Red to create the perfect humanoid, one that could look and act just like a human. However, Dr. Lawton doesn't want his creation to be used as a weapon, nor does he want anyone else getting their hands on his greatest creation. To this end, he takes Michi and runs to try to escape the Red Party.
- Duke Red as "Duke Red": A power mad politician with aspirations for world domination.
- Doctor Hanamaru as "Dr. Yorkshire Bell": A calm, wise scientist with a sage-like beard, who studies the radioactive sunspots and strange happenings around the city alongside Notaarin.
- Notaarin as "Notaarin": The superintendent general of the Metropolis police force, who hunts out Duke Red and the Red Party.

== English translation ==
In the United States, the manga was published in English by Dark Horse Comics with translations provided by Kumar Sivasubramanian and Studio Proteus, and editing consulting by Toren Smith, but is now out of print.

== Film adaptation ==
Metropolis is a 2001 anime film loosely based on the 1949 Metropolis manga. The anime, however, does draw aspects of its storyline directly from the 1927 film. The anime had an all-star production team, including renowned anime director Rintaro, Akira creator Katsuhiro Otomo as script writer, and animation by Madhouse Studios with conceptual support from Tezuka Productions.

== See also ==
- List of Osamu Tezuka manga
  - Lost World (manga)
  - Nextworld (manga)
- List of Osamu Tezuka anime
- Osamu Tezuka's Star System
