= Kei Kobayashi (voice actress) =

Japanese voice actress

Kei Kobayashi (小林 希唯, Kobayashi Kei; born June 30, 1976 in Tokyo Metropolis) is a Japanese voice actress affiliated with 81 Produce.

== Filmography ==
=== Television animation ===
- Burst Angel (Yuri Hongō)
- Fighting Beauty Wulong series (Takada)
- Fantastic Children (Chitto)
- Hamtaro (Cappy-ham)
- Tactical Roar (Shīna Lacerus)
- Transformers: Cybertron (Coby's mother)
- Papuwa (Takeuchi, Marker (young))

=== Dubbing roles ===
==== Live-action ====
- Godless (Alice Fletcher (Michelle Dockery))
- The O.C. (Anna Stern (Samaire Armstrong))
- The Night House (Madelyne (Stacy Martin))
- Oz the Great and Powerful (Strongman's Wife (Toni Wynne))

==== Animation ====
- Braceface (Nina Harper)
- Hi Hi Puffy AmiYumi (Ami)
- Inside Out (Mother's Disgust)
- The Fairly OddParents (Timmy Turner)
- The Jimmy Timmy Power Hour (Timmy Turner)
- The Jimmy Timmy Power Hour 2: When Nerds Collide (Timmy Turner)
- The Jimmy Timmy Power Hour 3: The Jerkinators (Timmy Turner)
- Pucca (Ching)
- Totally Spies! (Mandy)
