= Fantastic Children =

Japanese anime television series

- Cover art of the third volume of the DVD compilation of Fantastic Children by Bandai Entertainment

ファンタジックチルドレン (Fantajikku Chirudoren)
- Genre: Adventure, romance, science fiction
- Created by: Takashi Nakamura
- Anime television series
- Directed by: Takashi Nakamura
- Written by: Hideki Mitsui; Takashi Nakamura
- Music by: Kōji Ueno; Yang Bang-ean
- Studio: Nippon Animation
- Licensed by: EU: Beez Entertainment (expired); NA: Bandai Entertainment (expired)
- Original network: TXN (TV Tokyo)
- English network: SA: Animax India; SEA: Animax Asia
- Original run: October 4, 2004 – March 28, 2005
- Episodes: 26
- Manga

Tokei Jikake no Tabibito-tachi
- Written by: Takashi Nakamura
- Illustrated by: Masakazu Miyano
- Published by: Media Factory
- Magazine: Comic Flapper
- Original run: 2004 – 2005
- Volumes: 2
- Video game
- Developer: Inti Creates
- Publisher: Bandai
- Genre: Action/Adventure
- Platform: Game Boy Advance
- Released: May 19, 2005
- icon

Fantastic Children (ファンタジックチルドレン, Fantajikku Chirudoren) is a Japanese anime television series created by Takashi Nakamura and produced by Nippon Animation. It first aired in Japan across TV Tokyo between October 4, 2004, and March 28, 2005, totaling 26 episodes. There was an extended ending special released only on DVD.

The series was later translated and dubbed by Animax into English for broadcast across its English-language networks in Southeast Asia and South Asia. It was previously licensed in North America by Bandai Entertainment.

== Plot ==
The series opens with the introduction of a group of white-haired children, known as the "Befort Children", named after "Befort", a fictional village in Belgium where their existence was first recorded in 1489. This group of enigmatic children has been spotted at different times and places in Europe for over 500 years. Always with the appearance of 11-year-olds, they behave far more mature than they should be, never grow old, and seem to have supernatural power.

Then the story starts to unfold in 2012 by introducing Helga, an introverted 11-year-old orphan who drew pictures of a land with a crescent moon that she believed was her home. Her playmate and only friend in the orphanage, Chitto, wants to help Helga find it. So together they escape from the orphanage and set out on a journey in which they meet Tohma, an energetic boy in his home, Papin Island. There Tohma tries to befriend them but misunderstands Helga and becomes hostile to her. Later he is mesmerized by Helga's bravery in rescuing Chitto from a group of poisonous insects. Tohma, through his desire to help the two runaway orphans, ventures out on a quest that will eventually cross paths with the mission of the Befort Children, who have spent centuries wandering Europe in search of a person named Tina. As they go further they come to realize a truth far more great and entwined with many other mysterious characters.

== Characters ==
Tohma (トーマ) is the series protagonist. He is an enthusiastic and energetic young boy who lives with his parents on the shores of Papin Island. Voiced by: Junko Minagawa

Helga (ヘルガ, Heruga) is a quiet and introverted young girl, whom Tohma helps save from an oppressive orphanage. She is in search of a place which is the source of her paintings. Voiced by: Shiho Kawaragi

Chitto (チット) is a good-hearted young boy, who is an earnest and steadfast friend to Helga, and her best friend at the orphanage. Voiced by: Kei Kobayashi

The GED Organization (ゲド機関, Gedo Kikan) is led by Gherta Hawksbee. Gherta uses Conrad Röntgen's findings to reconstruct the Autozone, a machine which brings people back from the Zone, the land of the dead, using Orsel, the life force in all living things. Because of the high levels of Orsel required to bring someone back, however, a person can become very unstable and the Orsel can turn into a sort of weapon. Later, the GED is manipulated by Dumas so that he can send Tina's spirit back to her old body, though this plan does not work.

== Production ==
=== Staff ===
- Executive producer: Kōichi Motohashi
- Original creator, character designs and director: Takashi Nakamura
- Planning: Takuo Minegeshi, Michio Katō
- Planning coordination: Shin Unozawa, Kenichi Iyadomi, Shirō Sasaki
- Production manager: Shigeo Endō
- Script: Hideki Mitsui, Takashi Nakamura
- Art director: Nizo Yamamoto
- Art assistance: Osamu Masuyama, Akemi Imano
- Chief animation director: Miyuki Nakamura
- Storyboards: Katsumi Terahigashi, Hiroshi Fukutomi, Masaki Sugiyama
- Episode directors: Hiroshi Kaburagi, Kenichi Nishida, Kenichi Shimizu, Yoshimi Tsuda
- Animation directors: Kōichi Maruyama, Tetsurō Aoki, Hitoshi Haga, Yasuko Sakuma, Norihiro Naganuma
- Director of photography: Seiichi Morishita
- Color designs: Mayumi Satō
- Color designations: Yumi Asano, Makiko Nishidate
- Music: Kōji Ueno
- Sound director: Hiroyuki Hayase
- Music producer: Yūko Sakurai (Victor Entertainment)
- Music coordination: TV Tokyo Music
- Producer: Kenichi Satō
- Production: Hakuhodo DY Media Partners, Nippon Animation, FC Project

=== Soundtrack ===
The series' soundtrack was composed by Kōji Ueno. A CD containing a total of 27 tracks was released on March 14, 2006, under the title Fantastic Children: A Gift from Greecia. It included both the opening theme of the show, "Voyage" (performed by Inori, lyrics by Mikio Sakai, composition by Mayumi Yamazaki, arrangement by Takahito Eguchi), and the ending theme, "Mizu no Madoromi" (水のまどろみ) (performed by Origa, lyrics by Rie Hamada( Japanese version) Origa (Russian version), composition and arrangement by Kunihiko Ryo).

Fantastic Children: A Gift from Greecia
| No. | Title | Length |
|---|---|---|
| 1. | "Voyage (Cello version)" | 4:18 |
| 2. | "Enma" | 1:13 |
| 3. | "The Children of Béfort" | 7:47 |
| 4. | "Thoma" | 1:54 |
| 5. | "Wonder" | 1:20 |
| 6. | "Helga" | 1:20 |
| 7. | "Lonely Heart" | 1:00 |
| 8. | "Dumas" | 1:20 |
| 9. | "Gherta" | 1:39 |
| 10. | "Helga's Past Life" | 2:14 |
| 11. | "Empire of Water and Green – Greecia" | 1:58 |
| 12. | "Soran and Sess" | 2:25 |
| 13. | "Beloved Tina" | 1:33 |
| 14. | "Georca" | 1:47 |
| 15. | "Despair" | 1:37 |
| 16. | "Ultimate Weapon" | 1:38 |
| 17. | "Space-Time Distortion" | 3:35 |
| 18. | "Helga (Cello version)" | 1:30 |
| 19. | "The Children of Béfort (Piano solo)" | 3:08 |
| 20. | "Family Bond" | 1:16 |
| 21. | "Dumas's Wrath" | 1:01 |
| 22. | "Battle" | 1:38 |
| 23. | "Our Wonder" | 1:33 |
| 24. | "Yearning" | 1:30 |
| 25. | "The End" | 2:45 |
| 26. | "Opening theme: Voyage (TV version)" | 1:35 |
| 27. | "Ending theme: Mizu no Madoromi [Water's Rest] (TV version)" | 1:31 |
| Total length: | | 56:05 |

== Adaptations ==
=== Manga ===
Fantastic Children: Tokei Jikake no Tabibito-tachi (ファンタジックチルドレン 時計じかけの旅人たち), illustrated by Masakazu Miyano, was serialized in the monthly Comic Flapper. It was collected in two volumes.

1. ISBN 4-8401-0983-4
2. ISBN 4-8401-1302-5

=== Video game ===
The Fantastic Children video game was released for the Game Boy Advance on May 19, 2005, by Bandai. Developed by Inti Creates, the game follows Tohma through his adventures from Papen Island with Helga, Chitto and the Befort Children.
