= Yaku Tsuu: Noroi no Game =

- Developer: Idea Factory
- Platform: PlayStation
- Release: JP: February 7, 1997
- Genre: Adventure

Yaku Tsuu: Noroi no Game (Note: Japanese: 厄痛 呪いのゲーム; lit. Misfortune: The Cursed Game) is a 1997 adventure game developed by Idea Factory for the PlayStation. In the game, the player controls a character who is turned into a ghost after a car accident. They are able to inhabit other characters' bodies and make choices for them, which change the narrative flow of the game.

On the game's release, reviewers commented on the overall quality of the game's story and how its gameplay either aided or hindered its story and thematic development.

== Gameplay ==
Yaku Tsuu: Noroi no Game is an adventure game. In the game, a character is hit by a dump truck and becomes a ghost. This allows them to move between different characters at different branching points in the story. As in the previous game, Yaku: Yūjō Dangi (1996), the story changes depending on which character the player chooses.

== Development ==
Among the staff of Yaku Tsuu: Noroi no Game was Takayuki Higashifurin. Higashifurin joined the video game industry in his early 20s and first worked at Idea Factory. He wanted to create something unique, which was a quality he saw in their previous game, Yaku: Yūjō Dangi (1996). This allowed him to work on the follow-up, Yaku Tsuu: Noroi no Game, where he created the game's logo, user interface, and the package layout. He described Idea Factory as being a very small company at the time.

This game was supervised and had character design by the Japanese manga creator Hideshi Hino. Hino was known for works such as Panorama of Hell.

== Release and reception ==
Reception

Review scores
Publication	Score
Dengeki PlayStation	50/100, 65/100
Famitsu	6/10, 5/10, 6/10, 7/10

Yaku Tsuu: Noroi no Game was released in Japan for the PlayStation on February 7, 1997.

In terms of gameplay, a reviewer in Jugemu magazine found that the ability to switch between characters breaks up the otherwise monotonous gameplay. One reviewer in Famitsu found that the choices made in the game often did not significantly affect the story's overall outcome. Another added that in the Yaku: Yūjō Dangi (1996), the player could not grasp the general story with one playthrough, which made switching characters seem less significant in this game.

The reviewer from Jugemu said the game's unsettling atmosphere and unconventional storylines would likely divide opinions. Kei Katsura of Game Hihyō found the game's story to be less gory and more attuned to being creepy and unsettling. They said that as the story progressed, they grew to get more involved with the characters and found it enjoyable. They found the main flaw was that while the style was there, they felt that the themes the game's story tries to build were poorly developed.

One reviewer in Famitsu said that the game's story was not as strong as the reaction the player may get from the game's graphics, while another said the game generally worked due to its bizarre graphics and story. Another Famitsu reviewer said that the story's pacing was poor and that this was not helped as the game often reused graphics, which lessened the overall impact. Both reviewers in Dengeki PlayStation found the story lacking in the outrageousness of the previous game, with one reviewer specifically saying had expected more from Idea Factory and Hideshi Hino.

Writer Roringu Uchizawa of Famitsu picked the game as the game of the week in Famitsu finding its weird atmosphere as a highlight. He added that the game was dangerously close to being a kusoge (lit. 'shitty game').

== See also ==
- List of PlayStation games
