= List of Japanese films of 1985 =

A list of films released in Japan in 1985 (see 1985 in film).

== List ==
Title	Cast and crew	Notes	Ref(s)
The Burmese Harp	Kon Ichikawa (director); Kōji Ishizaka, Kiichi Nakai		
Changeman Movie			
Changeman: Shuttle Base in Danger!			
Fire Festival	Mitsuo Yanagimachi (director); Kiwako Taichi, Ryota Nakamoto, Norihei Miki		
Four Sisters	Nobuhiko Obayashi (director); Misako Konno, Atsuko Asano, Yasuko Sawaguchi		
Genmusenki reda	Kunihiko Yuyama (director)		
Godzilla 1985	R. J. Kiser, Koji Hashimoto (directors)		
Gray Sunset	Shunya Ito (director); Yukiyo Toake, Minoru Chiaki		
Guinea Pig: Devil's Experiment	Satoru Ogura (director)	Direct-to-video	
Guinea Pig 2: Flower of Flesh and Blood	Hideshi Hino (director); Hiroshi Tamura, Kirara Yūgao	Direct-to-video	
Haru no kane	Koreyoshi Kurahara (director); Kin'ya Kitaōji		
Kinnikuman the Movie: Counterattack! The Underground Space Choujins			
Kinnikuman the Movie: Hour of Triumph! Justice Superman			
Kinnikuman the Movie: Justice Superman vs. Ancient Superman			
The Legend of the Stardust Brothers	Macoto Tezuka (director); Shingo Kubota, Kazuhiro Takagi, Kyoko Togawa, ISSAY, Kiyohiko Ozaki		
The Life and Adventures of Santa Claus	Jules Bass, Arthur Rankin, Jr. (directors); J.D. Roth, Earl Hammond, Alfred Drake, Lesley Miller, Bob McFadden, Earle Hyman	Animated film	
Lonely Heart	Nobuhiko Obayashi (director); Satomi Kobayashi		
Lupin III: Legend of the Gold of Babylon	Seijun Suzuki, Shigetsugu Yoshida (directors)	Animated film	
Minna Agechau	Shusuke Kaneko (director)		
Mishima: A Life in Four Chapters	Paul Schrader (director); Ken Ogata, Masayuki Shionoya, Hiroshi Mikami	American-Japanese co-production	
Night on the Galactic Railroad	Gisaburo Sugii (director)	Animated film	
Ran	Akira Kurosawa (director); Tatsuya Nakadai, Mieko Harada, Jinpachi Nezu	Japanese-French co-production	
Seburi monogatari	Sadao Nakajima (director); Kenichi Hagiwara, Yumiko Fujita, Ken Mitsuishi		
Sorekara			
Tampopo	Juzo Itami (director); Tsutomu Yamazaki, Nobuko Miyamoto, Kōji Yakusho		
The Time Étranger		Animated film	
Tora-san, the Go-Between	Yoji Yamada (director); Kiyoshi Atsumi	35th in the Otoko wa Tsurai yo series	
Tora-san's Island Encounter	Yoji Yamada (director); Kiyoshi Atsumi	36th in the Otoko wa Tsurai yo series	
Typhoon Club	Shinji Sōmai (director)		
Urusei Yatsura: Remember My Love	Kazuo Yamazaki (director); Fumi Hirano and Toshio Furukawa	Animated film	
Vampire Hunter D	Toyoo Ashida (director)	Animated film	
Yamata no Orochi no Gyakushū	Takami Akai (director); Kakumi Takahashi, Tatsuto Nagayama, Kenichiro Mera		
Yuki no dansho – Jonetsu	Shinji Somai (director); Yuki Saito, Takaaki Enomoto, Masanori Sera		
Karate Cop 3 (Keiji monogatari 3 - Shiosai no uta)	Rokuro Sugimura (director)	Comedy	

== See also ==
- 1985 in Japan
- 1985 in Japanese television

== Footnotes ==
=== References ===
- Berra, John (2010). Japan. Intellect Books. ISBN 978-1841503356.
- Galbraith IV, Stuart (2008). The Toho Studios Story: A History and Complete Filmography. Scarecrow Press. ISBN 978-1461673743.
