= Laugh and Pon! =

Japanese variety show (1983)

Laugh and Pon! (Waratepon) was a Japanese variety show that was broadcast on the TBS network every Wednesday from 19:00 to 19:54 (Japan Standard Time) from July 6, 1983 to September 28, 1983.

== Overview ==
It started after the early end of the previous program "Assault HOT Studio!". Tanokin Trio, Beat Takeshi, and Iyo Matsumoto continued to appear, but the program ended after three months. Former cast member Takeshi has often said that the show was canceled after three episodes, but the actual number of episodes it aired was 12. It was also introduced in the July 2000 issue of "Nikkei Entertainment!" as the "No. 1 famous short-lived program"., data errors can also be seen here.

On April 15, 2000, it was revived for the first time in 17 years with only the title New Warate Pon 2000 as the opening special program.

== Program title ==
The title of this program was named by the producer Kunihiko Katsura. Due to his terrible naming sense, he was made a lot of fun by Takeshi and Fumio Takada in "Beat Takeshi's All Night Nippon".

In addition, Tamio Kageyama, who was in charge of organizing the program, said in his book Gokuraku that he was disappointed in Katsura, who had submitted numerous naming ideas at the program's planning meeting, but in the end had decided on a program title that was just his own idea. TV (Shinchosha, ISBN 4-10-110213-9). Kageyama has warned in the past about the silly naming of variety shows, but he apparently never thought that the show he was in charge of would have such a title, and he wrote an apology to the readers of the book.

== Performers ==
- Toshihiko Tahara (Tanokin Trio)
- Mahiko Kondo (Tanokin Trio)
- Yoshio Nomura (Tanokin Trio)
- Beat Takeshi
- Iyo Matsumoto
- Hiroshi Ikushima
- Naoto Takenaka
- Koichi Miura
- Rats & Stars
- Comte Red Light
- Tsurutaro Kataoka
- Naomi Matsui

== Staff ==
- Composition: Takuma Kojima, Jun Nagai, Tamio Kageyama, Yutaka Hirooka / Shosuke Oiwa
- Music: Yasu Miyagawa, Akihiko Takashima
- Choreography: Mitsuru Saijo
- Producer: Kunihiko Katsura, Eiichi Misumi

== Program content ==
It was a parody skit of the entire program promotion, with a fictional program guide. The facilitators were Iyo Matsumoto and Hiroshi Ikushima, and Beat Takeshi appeared as a studio guest.

Kohaku Kamen
A parody of special effects heroes. However, the story revolves around Kouhaku Kamen, played by Beat Takeshi, summoning monsters and aliens to confront the giant robot Mokujin 38 (a parody of Tetsujin 28) piloted by Masahiko Kondo. In the episode broadcast on August 17th, Mokujin 38, who was attacked by multiple monsters that appeared at the same time, self-destructed, and Mokujin 39 appeared as the second generation robot. However, in the final episode, Mokujin 39 was also destroyed, and in the end, the pilot, Kondo himself, became gigantic and fought off Kohaku Kamen.
In this corner, the monsters that appeared in the Ultraman franchise appear every time. Tsuburaya Productions was credited as a contributor. As the name suggests, the Kohaku Mask had his face painted red and white vertically. It's also quite weak.

Best ten puns
Introducing pun skits performed by the performers in the style of "The Best Ten".
Kintaro Samurai
The program title is a parody of "Momotaro Samurai". It is first introduced as the "20,000th broadcast," but of course it has not been broadcast even 20,000 times.
Passionate about judo!
A parody of a youth drama set in a judo club. Toshihiko Tahara played the main character.
Takenaka Theater
Naoto Takenaka performed an impersonation of Shusaku Endo and the Juhachiban joke The One Who Gets Angry While Laughing.
trampoline theater
A parody of home dramas. A set is placed on top of the trampoline, and the child actor Tsurutaro and others disrupt the place and get things out of control.
silhouette quiz
Host Takeshi, Miura, guest, and Tsurutaro guess who is reflected in the shadow.

== Broadcast list ==
Broadcast date (1983)	Subtitle	
1	July 6	Appearance! Alien Baltan
2	July 13	Five Doctors Game Research
3	July 20	Bakusho Takeshi's Lord...
4	July 27	First appearance match shy teacher
5	August 3	Takeshi's Bakusho Gymnastics
6	August 10	Takeshi's Seven Bakusho Changes
7	August 17	Awesome! Mokujin No. 38 dies in an explosion
8	August 31	Hot-blooded match T-shirt detective
9	September 7	Panic! monster Japan
10	September 14	Struggle match T-shirt detective
11	September 21	A bright and talented lawyer
12	September 28	Toshi's passionate teacher

== Notes ==
- The program's theme song has lyrics based on the names of the performers. Each performer sings the part with their own name, but Takeshi always sings listlessly.
- The pun "Which celebrity often uses taxis?" and "Beat Taxi (Beat Takeshi)" was created in the Top Ten puns, and was later produced by Beat Takeshi and Akashiya Sanma by Nippon Television. It was introduced on the host Special Program (the predecessor program of "Takeshi Sanma End of the Century Special Program!! Legend of the World's Greatest Men"). Perhaps influenced by this, Takeshi wears a taxi headgear and introduces himself as Beat Taxi in Sekai Maru Mie! TV Special Investigation Department, which is produced by the same staff as the same special program. Ta.
- Anime producer Masaki Kaifu was an AD of this program when he was a TBS employee.
- The program hosted by Beat Takeshi was later reduced to only the first half of the 30-minute slot in "Takeshi's Comedy Sudden Death" from October 1984 (the second half was It continues to be sponsored by Quiz Show).
