= Otonagai. =

Studio album by Rider Chips
- Released: March 16, 2005
- Recorded: MIT Studio
- Genre: Hard rock, blues rock
- Length: 66:46
- Label: Avex Mode
- Producer: Takayuki Nagase

Rider Chips chronology
Otonagai. (2005)	Majimemashite. (2006)

Otonagai. (おとな買い。; lit. "Buying a Large Amount of Collectibles") is the first album by Japanese hard rock band Rider Chips, released on March 16, 2005. The catalogue code for this album is AVCA-22283.

== Track listing ==
1. "ELEMENTS" feat. Ricky
2. "The people with no name" feat. m.c.A.T
3. "Sitting On The Dynamite" feat. Jin Hashimoto
4. "We gotta fight" feat. Diamond Yukai
5. "DEEP BREATH" feat. Rolly
6. "Neppū Rider" (熱風ライダー, Neppū Raidā; "Hot Blasted Rider") feat. Ricky
7. "Gravitation" feat. Keiko Terada
8. "Kaban" (鞄; Bag) feat. Kenji Ohtsuki
9. "Kamen Rider no Uta" (仮面ライダーのうた, Kamen Raidā no Uta; "Song of the Kamen Rider") feat. m.c.A.T
10. "Super Human" feat. Ricky
11. "Hard knock life" feat. Diamond Yukai
12. "Hateshinai Honō no Naka e" (果てしない炎の中へ; "To An Endless Flame") feat. Keiko Terada
13. "Touch" feat. Rolly & Jin Hashimoto
14. "The Last Card" feat. m.c.A.T
15. "POWER CHILD" feat. Rolly

== Personnel ==
- Yoshio Nomura – guitar
- Koichi Terasawa – bass
- Joe – drums
- Ayumu Koshikawa (violin) – track 8
- Cher Watanabe (keyboards) – tracks 1–4, 6–12 & 14
- Diamond☆Yukai (vocals and blues harp) – tracks 4 & 11
- Jin Hashimoto (vocals) – tracks 3 & 13
- Keiko Terada (vocals) – tracks 7 & 12
- Kenji Otsuki (vocals) – track 8
- m.c.A・T (vocals) – tracks 2, 9 & 14
- Muneyuki Kamimoto (keyboards) – track 15
- Raida (chorus) – Shounen Shoujo Gassyoutai
- Ricky (vocals) – tracks 1, 6 & 10
- Rolly (vocals) – tracks 5, 13 & 15
- Yoshichika Inomata (keyboards) – tracks 5 & 13
