= Odorenarin =

Studio album by Rider Chips
- Released: November 22, 2011
- Genre: Hard rock, blues rock
- Label: Rider Chips, Daiki Sound

Rider Chips chronology
Kore de Yoroshikatta Deshō ka. (2009)	Odorenarin (2011)

Odorenarin (オドレナリン) is the fourth studio album by Japanese rock band Rider Chips, released on November 22, 2011. It is the second album released independently through their own label.

The album's title is a portmanteau of the words odoru (踊る, "to dance") and adorenarin (アドレナリン, "adrenalin").

== Track listing ==
No.	Title	Lyrics	Music	Length
1.	"MISS YOU"	Koichi Terasawa	Terasawa
2.	"The wanderer's blood"	Satoshi "JOE" Miyawaki	Yoshio Nomura
3.	"Inazuma×××" (稲妻×××, "Lightning×××")	Ricky	Rider Chips
4.	"Close to Heart"	Ricky, Nomura	Nomura
5.	"Kimiiro no Hoshizora" (君色の星空, "You-Colored Starry Sky")	Terasawa	Terasawa
6.	"Hentōsen Harassment" (扁桃腺ハラスメント, Hentōsen Harasumento, "Tonsil Harassment")	Nomura	Nomura
7.	"Butterfly"	Miyawaki	Terasawa
8.	"Brand new World"	Ricky	Ricky
9.	"Speed Lazer"	Nomura	Ricky
10.	"Kimi ga Soko ni Iru no Shitteru" (君がそこに居るの知ってる, "I Know That You Happen to Be There")	Nomura	Nomura

== Personnel ==
- Yoshio Nomura – guitar
- Koichi Terasawa – bass
- Joe – drums
- Ricky – vocals
- Cher Watanabe – keyboards
