= Rider Chips =

Japanese hard rock band

- Origin: Japan
- Genres: Hard rock
- Years active: 2000–present
- Labels: Avex Mode
- Members: Yoshio Nomura; Koichi Terasawa; JOE; Ricky; Cher Watanabe
- Website: Official website

Rider Chips (ライダーチップス, Raidā Chippusu; stylized as RIDER CHIPS) are a Japanese hard rock band started in 2000 on the Nippon Columbia label before switching to Avex Mode in 2002. Originally, it consisted of only three instrumentalists who invited different vocalists periodically. But in 2006, Ricky (formerly of Dasein) joined the group full-time as vocalist.

The group was formed in order to provide songs for the popular Kamen Rider Series, and was the official band of the Kamen Rider shows from 2000 to 2007, according to the CD jackets.

== Members ==
- Yoshio Nomura (野村 義男, Nomura Yoshio) – guitar
- Koichi Terasawa (寺沢 功一, Terasawa Kōichi) – bass
- Satoshi "Joe" Miyawaki (宮脇“JOE”知史, Miyawaki "Jō" Satoshi) – drums
- Ricky – vocals
- Cher Watanabe (渡部 チェル, Watanabe Cheru) – keyboards, arranger

== Discography ==
=== Albums ===
1. Otonagai. (おとな買い。; March 16, 2005)
2. Majimemashite. (まじめまして。; January 25, 2006)
3. Kore de Yoroshikatta Deshō ka. (これでよろしかったでしょうか。; November 11, 2009)
  - Album released independently
4. Odorenarin (オドレナリン; November 22, 2011)

=== Singles ===
1. "Power Child" (December 1, 2000)
  1. "Let's Go!! Rider Kick ~2000 Ver.~" (レッツゴー!!ライダーキック～2000 Ver.～, Rettsu Gō!! Raidā Kikku ~2000 Ver.~) featuring Hiroshi Fujioka
  2. "Power Child" featuring ROLLY
  3. "Kimi totomoni Rider wa Iru" (君と共にライダーはいる, Kimi to tomo ni Raidā wa Iru; translated as "You are with the Rider") featuring Hiroshi Fujioka
  4. "Kimi totomoni Rider wa Iru ~Instrumental Ver.~" (君と共にライダーはいる～Instrumental Ver.～, Kimi totomoni Raidā wa Iru ~Instrumental Ver.~)
  5. "Let's Go!! Rider Kick ~2000 Ver.~ (Original Karaoke)" (レッツゴー!!ライダーキック～2000 Ver.～（オリジナルカラオケ）, Rettsu Gō!! Raidā Kikku ~2000 Ver.~ (Orijinaru Karaoke))
  6. "Power Child (Original Karaoke)" (Power Child（オリジナルカラオケ）, Power Child (Orijinaru Karaoke))
2. "Deep Breath" (August 18, 2001)
  - The title track was used as the third ending theme song for Kamen Rider Agito
  1. "Deep Breath" featuring ROLLY
  2. "Sitting On the Dynamite" featuring Jin Hashimoto
  3. "Touch" featuring ROLLY and Jin Hashimoto
  4. "Deep Breath (Original Karaoke)"
  5. "Sitting on the Dynamite (Original Karaoke)"
  6. "Touch (Original Karaoke)"
3. "Hateshinai Honō no Naka e" (果てしない炎の中へ; translated as "Into the Eternal Flame") (August 7, 2002)
  - Features Keiko Terada (寺田 恵子) on vocals
  - The title track was used as the second ending theme song for Kamen Rider Ryuki
  1. "Hateshinai Honō no Naka e" (果てしない炎の中へ, Hateshinai Honō no Naka e)
  2. "Gravitation"
  3. "Hateshinai Honō no Naka e (Original Karaoke)" (果てしない炎の中へ（オリジナルカラオケ）, Hateshinai Honō no Naka e (Orijinaru Karaoke))
  4. "Gravitation (Original Karaoke)"
4. "The people with no name" (July 24, 2003)
  - The title track was used as the second ending theme song for Kamen Rider 555
  1. "The people with no name" featuring m.c.A.T
  2. "All eyez on me" featuring Natsuki Katō
  3. "The people with no name (Original Karaoke)"
  4. "All eyez on me (Original Karaoke)"
5. "The people with no name ~Rap No. 1 version~" (August 20, 2003)
  1. "The people with no name ~Rap No. 1 version~" featuring m.c.A.T
  2. "Kaban" (鞄; translated as "Briefcase") featuring Kenji Ohtsuki
  3. "The People with No Name ~Rap No. 1 version~ (Original Karaoke)"
  4. "Kaban (Original Karaoke)" (鞄（オリジナルカラオケ）, Kaban (Orijinaru Karaoke))
6. "Kamen Rider no Uta" (仮面ライダーのうた, Kamen Raidā no Uta; "The Song of Kamen Rider") (February 18, 2004)
  - Features m.c.A.T on vocals
  - The title track is a cover of the first ending theme song for Kamen Rider
  1. "Kamen Rider no Uta" (仮面ライダーのうた, Kamen Raidā no Uta)
  2. "The Last Card"
  3. "Kamen Rider no Uta (Original Karaoke)" (仮面ライダーのうた（オリジナルカラオケ）, Kamen Raidā no Uta (Orijinaru Karaoke))
  4. "The Last Card (Original Karaoke)"
7. "ELEMENTS" (September 29, 2004)
  - Features Ricky on vocals
  - The title track was used as the second opening theme song for Kamen Rider Blade
  1. "ELEMENTS"
  2. "Neppū Rider" (熱風Rider, Neppū Raidā; translated as "Hot Wind Rider")
  3. "ELEMENTS (Original Karaoke)"
  4. "Neppū Rider (Original Karaoke)" (熱風Rider（オリジナルカラオケ）, Neppū Raidā (Orijinaru Karaoke))
8. "Full Force" (April 5, 2006)
  - The title track is used as the first ending theme song for Kamen Rider Kabuto
  1. "Full Force"
  2. "Bang! Bang! Revolution"
  3. "Full Force (Instrumental with chorus)"
  4. "Bang! Bang! Revolution (Instrumental with chorus)"
9. "Lord of the Speed" (November 1, 2006)
  - features Yūki Satō (佐藤祐基)
  - the title track is used as the second ending theme song for Kamen Rider Kabuto
  1. "Lord of the Speed"
  2. "Lord of the Speed (Instrumental with chorus)"
  3. "Lord of the Speed (Re-mix Ver.)"
10. "Kodoku o Fumitsubuse" (孤独をふみつぶせ; translated as "Trampled Solitude") (August 1, 2008)
  - First independent single
  1. "Kodoku o Fumitsubuse"
  2. "Hana Uta" (花唄; translated as "Flower Song")
  3. "Kodoku o Fumitsubuse (Karaoke)" (孤独をふみつぶせ（カラオケ）)
  4. "Hana Uta (Karaoke)" (花唄（カラオケ）)
11. "Ride a firstway" (September 16, 2009)
  - The title track is used as the theme for Pachinko Kamen Rider MAX EDITION
  1. "Ride a firstway"
  2. "Dreamer"
  3. "Ride a firstway instrumental"
  4. "Dreamer instrumental"
12. "“Blessed Wind" (November 21, 2012)
  - Both songs are used for Kamen Rider Wizard as themes for the main character's Hurricane and Land Styles, respectively. The single is released together with “Last Engage” by Kamen Rider Girls, which contains the themes for Wizard's Flame and Water Styles.
  1. "Blessed Wind"
  2. "Strength of the Earth"

=== Other releases ===
- "Flashback" (31 August 2005)
  - The title track performed by Rin' featuring m.c.A.T was used as the theme song for Kamen Rider Hibiki & The Seven Senki. RIDER CHIPS provided the B-side titled "Flashback -RIDER CHIPS version-".
- Masked Rider series Theme song Re-Product CD SONG ATTACK First featuring KUUGA KIVA RYUKI (20 May 2009)
  - Features the following tracks by RIDER CHIPS:
  - "Kamen Rider Kuuga! Ver.RIDER CHIPS" (仮面ライダークウガ! Ver.RIDER CHIPS, Kamen Raidā Kūga! Ver.RIDER CHIPS)~ featuring Masayuki Tanaka
  - "Break the Chain Ver.RIDER CHIPS" featuring Tourbillon
  - "Alive A life Ver.RIDER CHIPS" featuring Rica Matsumoto
- Masked Rider series Theme song Re-Product CD SONG ATTACK RIDE Second featuring BLADE 555 AGITΩ (24 June 2009)
  - Features the following tracks by RIDER CHIPS:
  - "Round ZERO～BLADE BRAVE Ver.RIDER CHIPS" featuring Nanase Aikawa
  - "Justiφ's Ver.RIDER CHIPS" featuring ISSA
  - "Kamen Rider AGITO Ver.RIDER CHIPS" (仮面ライダーAGITO Ver.RIDER CHIPS, Kamen Raidā AGITO Ver.RIDER CHIPS) featuring Shinichi Ishihara
- Masked Rider series Theme song Re-Product CD SONG ATTACK RIDE Third featuring DEN-O KABUTO HIBIKI (22 July 2009)
  - Features the following tracks by RIDER CHIPS:
  - "Climax Jump Ver.RIDER CHIPS" featuring AAA Den-O Form
  - "Next Level Ver.RIDER CHIPS" featuring YU-KI
  - "Boy! Ver.RIDER CHIPS" (少年よVer.RIDER CHIPS, Shōnen yo Ver.RIDER CHIPS) featuring Akira Fuse
- Kamen Rider Build Theme Songs & Insert Songs Collection (2018)
  - Features the following tracks by RIDER CHIPS:
  - Law of the Victory
- Heisei Kamen Rider 20 Titles Commemoration Best (1 May 2019)
  - Features the following tracks by RIDER CHIPS:
  - Kamen Rider Kuuga! (with Masayuki Tanaka)
  - EXCITE (RIDER CHIPS ver.)
- Kamen Rider Zi-O Main Theme & Insert Song Best Song Collection
  - Features the following tracks by RIDER CHIPS:
  - Next New Wφrld
