= Yaku: Yūjō Dangi =

1996 video game

- PlayStation cover art
- Developers: Axis Art Amuse; Idea Factory
- Publisher: Idea Factory
- Director: Shingo Kuwana
- Platform: PlayStation
- Release: JP: 13 January 1996
- Genre: Visual novel
- Mode: Single player

Yaku: Yūjō Dangi (Note: Japanese: 厄 友情談疑; lit. Misfortune: Doubts About Friendship) is a 1996 visual novel developed by Axis Art Amuse and Idea Factory. It is a horror-themed game involving five friends who return to their old elementary school to dig up an old time capsule. As a visual novel, the game involves the player choosing from several menu and dialogue options to advance the plot and unlock different endings. The game also includes the ability to swap between different characters perspectives to see the story from their point of view.

The game was directed by Shingo Kuwana, it was one of the earliest games developed by his team his newly found company Idea Factory which started in late 1994. It was released in early 1996. A sequel titled Noroi no Game was released in 1997.

== Gameplay and plot ==
Yaku: Yūjō Dangi is a horror-themed visual novel. The games tasks players with choosing from several menu and dialogue options that appear onscreen to advance the plot and unlock different endings. The game allows the player to change the point-of-view the story is told from between characters allowing for five different scenarios to progress through. On a first playthrough, only two characters point-of-view can be alternated between.

Yaku: Yūjō Dangi is about five friends who return to their old elementary school to dig up an old time capsule.

== Development and release ==
Yaku: Yūjō Dangi was developed by Idea Factory and Axis Art Amuse. The software for the game was completely developed by Axis Art Amuse, a company established in 1992, and in 1995 had begun developing games for consoles such as the 3DO, Sega Saturn and PlayStation. Idea Factory was established in October 1994 by Yoshiaki Sato and both Koichi Ohta and Shingo Kuwana, with the latter two being former employees of Data East. Yaku: Yūjō Dangi's director was Shingo Kuwana. Kuwana reflected on their early days at Idea Factory, saying that it was "nothing but tough times", saying they were very inexperienced. He continued to say he was thankful for magazines like Dengeki PlayStation for writing about their companies earlier games including Yaku: Yūjō Dangi and Spectral Tower as they felt that not many publications were covering their games.

The game was published by Idea Factory for the PlayStation in Japan on January 13, 1996. It was released digitally on the PlayStation Store on February 22, 2007.

== Reception ==
Reception

Review scores
Publication	Score
Famitsu	7/10, 5/10, 7/10, 5/10
Dengeki PlayStation	45/100, 55/100, 55/100, 55/100

In Famicom Tsūshin two reviewers complimented the graphics, saying they were creepy and the lower-quality production values on them were most likely done on purpose. Another disliked it saying it was hard to empathize with them and that their design made it hard to get involved with the more heart-breaking stories. Two others complimenting the ability to swap characters which they felt was an innovative touch. Other comments involved the loading time of the CD ruined the pacing of the game while the lack of sound effects made anything that was supposed to be scary come of poorly. In Dengeki PlayStation, one reviewer found it difficult to discern if it was supposed to be comedic or serious while two others found it frustrating to have to play through the entire game to reach the multiple endings. One of the reviewers founding the concept of switching between characters interesting in theory, but poor applied in the game.

In Game Criticism, game developer Kenji Eno reviewed the game describing it as "difficult to explain.", comparing it to his own game D (1995) and Chunsoft's Banshee's Last Cry (1994). Eno said the graphics were done badly, but create a certain unique flavor to them due to this. He encouraged curious players to try the game but was critical of its themes of bullying and how it was handled and how the story limited how the player could handle bullies in the game, which he described as leaving the game to become monotonous in its gameplay and immature in its themes.

== Legacy ==
The same team who developed the game followed it up with it up with CG mukashi hanashi jīsan 2 do bikkuri !! (Note: CG昔話し じいさん2度びっくり!!, lit. CG Old Tales: Grandpa's Double Surprise!!) (1996), a game where players get to re-write Japanese folk tales by the choices they've made. A sequel to Yaku: Yūjō Dangi was released in 1997 titled Yaku Tsuu: Noroi no Game, which was supervised by the Japanese manga creator Hideshi Hino.

An English-language fan translation of the game was available in 2025 under the title Misfortune: A Story of Suspicious Friendships.

== See also ==
- List of PlayStation (console) games
- Video games in Japan
