= Masahiko Kondō =

- 近藤真彦
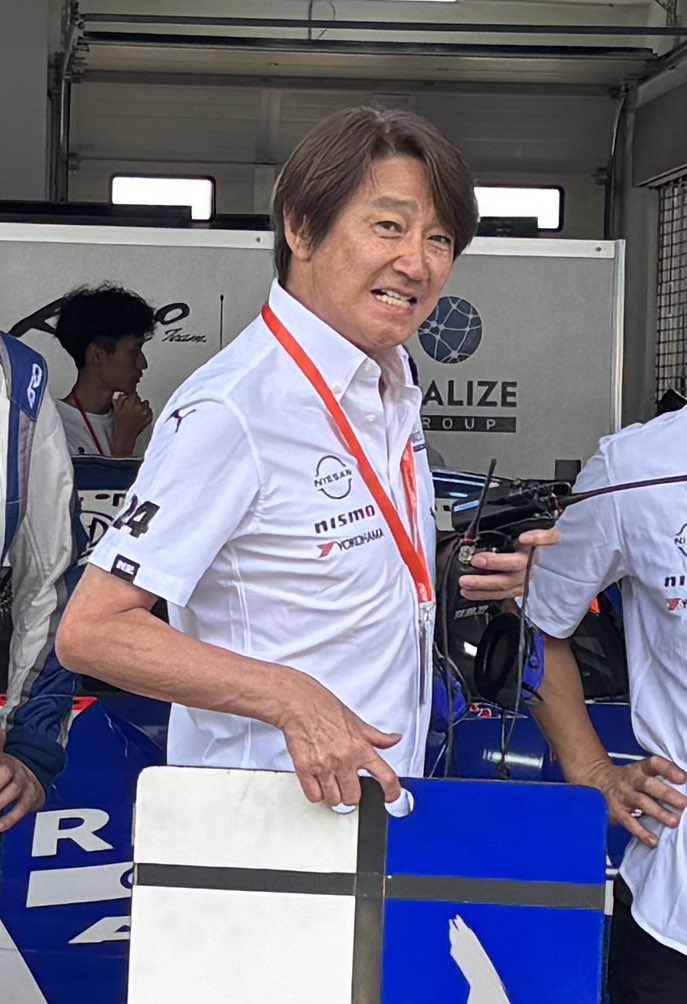
- Kondō at Super GT Malaysia Round in 2025
- Born: July 19, 1964 (age 62); Yokohama, Kanagawa Prefecture, Japan
- Other name: Matchy
- Spouse: Atsuko Wada (m. 1994)
- Children: 1
- Musical career
- Genres: J-pop, hard rock, kayōkyoku
- Occupations: Singer, lyricist, actor, racing team manager
- Years active: 1979–present
- Labels: Sony Music, Ariola Japan

24 Hours of Le Mans career
- Years: 1994–1996, 2000–2003
- Teams: A.D.A. Engineering Ltd./Team Nippon, Team Kunimitsu Honda, NISMO, TV Asahi Team Dragon, Oreca, Kondo Racing
- Best finish: 8th (2000)
- Class wins: 0
- Website: www.matchy.co.jp

Masahiko Kondō (近藤 真彦, Kondō Masahiko; born July 19, 1964), or Matchy, is a Japanese singer, lyricist, actor, racing car manager and former semi-professional racing driver. He was a member of the Tanokin Trio. Kondō is also a semi-professional racing driver and a racing team owner. He founded the racing team Kondo Racing in 2000, which currently competes in both Super Formula and Super GT.

== Biography ==
=== 1980–1987: Early recording career ===
Kondō was born in Yokohama. Working for the agency Johnny & Associates, Kondō was signed to the record label RVC. His debut single "Sneaker Blues" debuted at number-one on the Oricon weekly single charts in December 1980. With the single, he became the first artist to have a debut single to go straight in at number one on Oricon at release. As of 2008, he is the only solo male singer to have a debut single to debut at number one in his teens in Oricon history. The single topped the Oricon charts for five consecutive weeks, and eventually sold over one million copies.

On March 5, 1981, Kondō released his first studio album, Thank Ai You. He wrote the lyrics for the songs "Gloria" and "Just A Dance" for the album. Thank Ai You topped the Oricon weekly charts making him the youngest solo male singer to have the debut album to reach number one on the charts at the age of 16 years 8 months. In 1982, he scored another hit called Passion Hot Wind Blown Away which topped the Oricon weekly charts for two weeks (1/25/1982 - 2/1/1982).

In 1985, Kondō moved from RVC to CBS Sony (now Sony Music Entertainment Japan). On December 31, 1987, his song "Orokamono" won the grand prix award at the 29th Japan Record Awards.

=== 1988–2004: Racing career and "Midnight Shuffle" ===
Kondō learned to drive when he was already famous as a singer. Kondō had always had an interest in cars from an early age and driving on the track engendered his desire to drive race cars. He practiced and was accepted into a racing team when he was 19 in 1984 going on to having a moderately successful career on Japan's race circuit. In 1988 he took part in the All-Japan Formula Three Championship for the first time. On November 10, 1989, he released the single "Andalucia ni Akogarete", which was his cover version of the single by Masatoshi Mashima of Japanese punk rock band The Blue Hearts released on October 21, 1989. While Mashima's original version peaked at number thirteen, Kondō's cover version reached number nine in the Oricon charts.

In 1994, Kondō took part in the 24 Hours of Le Mans for the first time. He also made his debut in the All Japan Grand Touring Car Championship that year with Team Taisan, winning on his debut race at Fuji Speedway in the wheel of an ex-Group C Porsche 962C. The victory, coupled with a third-place finish in the final round at Mine Circuit, allowed him to finish 9th in the 1994 standings. Kondō remained with Team Taisan for the next season and was credited with a win in the fifth round of the season at Sportsland Sugo despite being ineligible to score championship points on that round because he did not met the minimum distance requirement.

Kondō's 1996 song "Midnight Shuffle" peaked at number four in the Oricon weekly single charts. The song was the theme of Japanese television drama Ginrō Kaiki File: Futatsu no Zunō o Motsu Shōnen, in which then-Johnny's Jr. Koichi Domoto played a main role. Kondō appeared on NHK's Kōhaku Uta Gassen annual TV show, performing "Midnight Shuffle". That same year, Kondō switched teams to compete with the NISMO factory team on the newly rebranded GT500 class in JGTC. He went on to finish 11th and 19th in the 1996 and 1997 standings respectively.

Kondō concentrated his efforts to his full-time racing career starting from 1998, rarely appearing on TV and not putting out any new songs. His occasional appearances on TV were as a racer or racing commentator. On the same year he made his first and only season in JGTC's GT300 class as the driver NISMO's GT300 team, finishing 6th in the standings. Kondō returned to GT500 in the following year with Toyota Team Cerumo, where he would compete for four seasons before retiring from JGTC at the end of the 2002 season. On May 22, 2002, he released a single but it was a cover for his 1985 song "Yoisho".

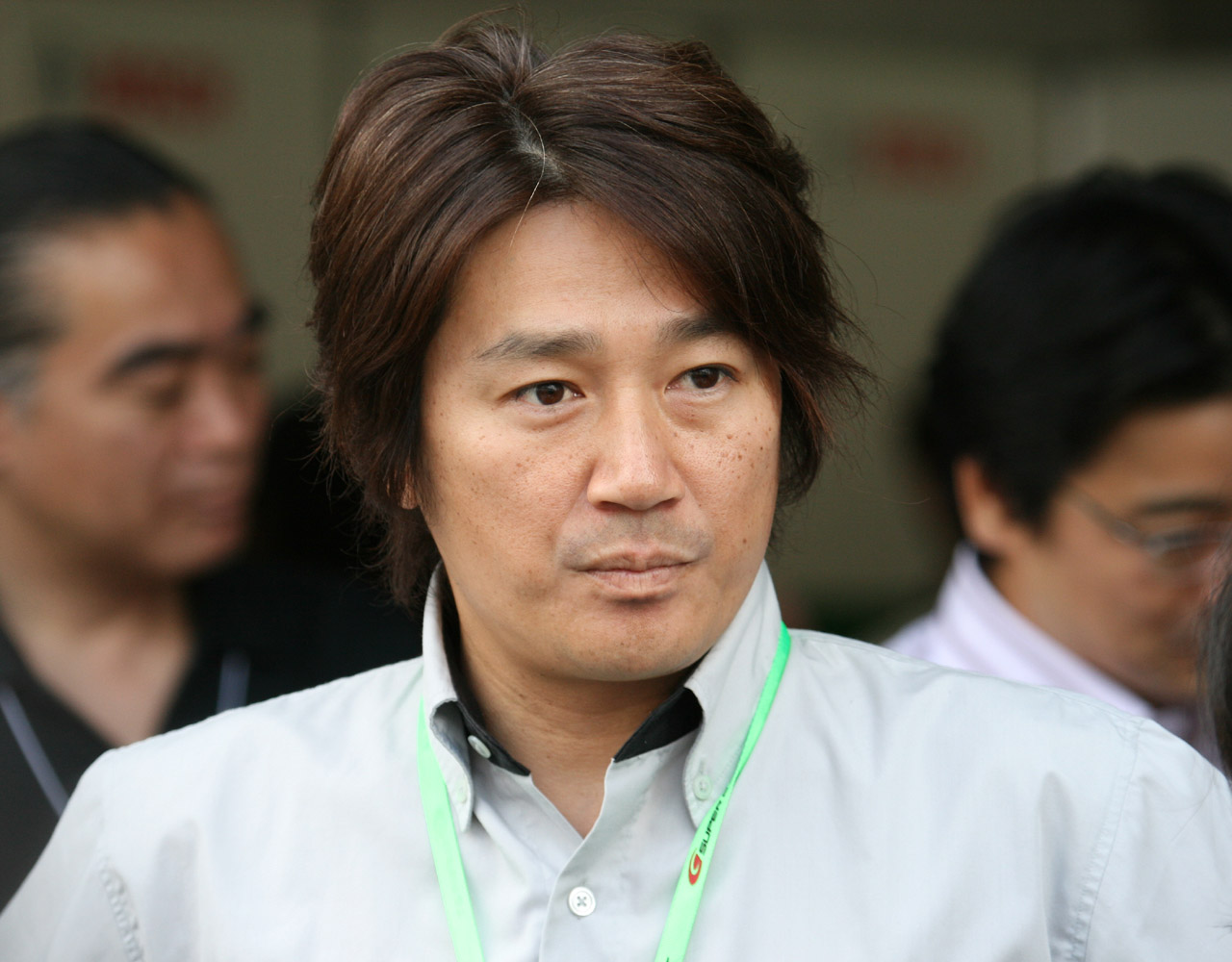
Kondō in 2008

=== 2005–2020: Returning to the recording studio ===
In 2005, Kondō decided to make a full return as a singer for the 25th anniversary of his debut. On December 14, 2005, he released the single "Chōsensya", which means challenger. He appeared in many TV programs, held dinner shows and went on a limited concert tour. He joined many of his successors such as SMAP, KinKi Kids, V6 and Arashi on their TV shows.

On January 25, 2006, Sony released Kondō's tribute album Matchy Tribute, in which Hitomi Takahashi covered the song "Midnight Shuffle". He also released his greatest hits album Matchy Best on February 6, 2006. The album Matchy Best debuted at number fifteen on the Oricon album charts. On May 9, 2007, he released his first DVD work, Kondō Masahiko '07 Valentine's Day in Budokan, which was shot at his live concert at the Nippon Budokan on February 14, 2007. The DVD debuted at number one on the Oricon weekly music DVD charts.

In December 2007, it was announced that Kondō collaborated with Johnny's Jr., the five-member of J-rock band "Question?", forming the temporary group "Matchy with Question" and singing the song "Mezamero! Yasei". The song "Mezamero! Yasei" was used for the ending theme of anime series Naruto: Shippuden and was released as a CD single on January 23, 2008. The single debuted at number five on the Oricon charts and with the first week sales of around 40,000 copies.

Kondō released the single "Banka (Otokotachi no Banka)" on December 23, 2008, and the single "Motto" on December 13, 2009. On February 22, 2010, he released the single "Zanbara". The first track, "Kokoro Zanbara", and the second track, "Koi Zanbara", were composed by Hal and Tsukasa respectively. The lyrics of both songs were written by Kōhan Kawauchi. Kawauchi sent the lyrics of the song to Johnny & Associates in 1989 but it had never been released until Kawauchi's death in 2008. The reason given was that the song seemed to be too sad for Kondo whose mother died in 1986.

On April 10, 2010, Kondō started his first nationwide concert tour in Japan 21 years after his 1989 nationwide tour.

In November 2020, Johnny & Associates announced that Kondō's activities were suspended indefinitely after he admitted he had an extra-marital affair.

=== 2021-present: Departure of Johnny's, independent ===
At the end of April 2021, Kondō took responsibility for the scandal he had caused and left Johnny's, to which he had belonged for 44 years. Kondo talked about the circumstances leading up to his departure in a radio program he appeared on in September of the same year, "Sayuri Matsui's 'new normal' small room" on Nippon Cultural Broadcasting. Kondo cited the recent generational change in Johnny's as the reason for his departure, and the deaths of his benefactors Johnny Kitagawa, as well as apologizing for betraying his fans through his own misconduct.

In November of the same year, Kondō resumed his performing career with his first concert after independence, Masahiko Kondo ReSTART 20+21+1×1-2 at Nakano Sun Plaza Hall. Yoshio Nomura, a close friend of Kondo's for 40 years, who together with Kondo had taken the world by storm as the Tanokin Trio, also participated in the concert and sang a total of 35 songs.

== Personal life ==
Beginning in 1985, Kondō was in a relationship with singer Akina Nakamori and the two were engaged. In 1989, however, it was reported that Kondō was having an affair with Hong Kong singer Anita Mui. Shortly after the initial reports of Kondō's affair with Mui surfaced, a second cheating scandal surfaced when the magazine Friday released photos of Kondō and Seiko Matsuda (who was married at the time to Masaki Kanda) on a secret rendezvous at a hotel terrace in New York. On July 7, 1989, in response to the scandals, Nakamori broke into Kondō's apartment and attempted suicide. A press conference was held on December 31 by both Kondō and Johnny & Associates, with Nakamori present by invitation. It was held with a golden screen backdrop, usually reserved for marriage announcements, only for Kondō to announce that he has ended the relationship. Nakamori, although being an invited guest, read a prepared speech apologizing (reportedly under duress by Johnny & Associates' vice president Mary Yasuko Fujishima) for her suicide attempt and publicly forgiving Kondō.

Kondō married Atsuko Wada, a non-celebrity woman, in 1994, with a son born in 2006 or 2007 (age 18–19).

In November 2020, Shukan Bunshun reported allegations that Kondō was having an extramarital affair with a 31-year-old woman since 2015, which he confirmed. He was suspended by his agency indefinitely to atone for the affair.

== Selected filmography ==
=== Film ===
- Tanokin Super Hit Series
  - Graffiti Youth: Sneaker Blues (February 11, 1981)
  - Blue Jeans Memory (July 11, 1981)
  - Good Luck Love (December 20, 1981)
  - Highteen Boogie (August 7, 1982)
  - The Mysterious Gemini • Y&S (December 11, 1982)
  - Heart Beat (August 4, 1983)
- Love Forever (1983)

=== Television ===
- Kinpachi-sensei (1979–80), Kiyoshi Hoshino
- Totto-chan (2017), Hisaya Morishige

== Awards and nominations ==
=== Japan Record Awards ===
The Japan Record Awards is a major music awards show held annually in Japan by the Japan Composer's Association.

| Year | Nominee / work | Award | Result |
|---|---|---|---|
| 2010 | Masahiko Kondō | Best Singer Award | Won |

== Racing record ==
=== All-Japan GT Championship results ===
(key) (Races in bold indicate pole position; races in italics indicate fastest lap)

| Year | Team | Car | No. | Class | 1 | 2 | 3 | 4 | 5 | 6 | 7 | 8 | Rank | Points |
|---|---|---|---|---|---|---|---|---|---|---|---|---|---|---|
| 1994 | Team Taisan | Porsche 962C | 35 | GT1 | FUJ | SEN | **FUJ**; 1 | SUG | MIN; 3 | | | | 9th | 32 |
| 1995 | Team Taisan | Ferrari F40 | 34 | GT1 | SUZ; 11 | FUJ | | | | | | | 15th | 16 |
| 1995 | Team Taisan | Porsche 911 GT2 | 35 | GT1 | | | SEN; 3 | FUJ; 9 | SUG; 1 | MIN; 9 | | | 15th | 16 |
| 1996 | NISMO | Nissan Skyline GT-R | 556 | GT500 | SUZ; 6 | FUJ; Ret | SEN; 17 | FUJ; 5 | SUG; 3 | MIN; 10 | | | 11th | 27 |
| 1997 | NISMO | Nissan Skyline GT-R | 556 | GT500 | SUZ; 5 | FUJ; Ret | SEN; 14 | FUJ; 9 | MIN; Ret | SUG; Ret | | | 19th | 10 |
| 1998 | Xanavi Racing with NISMO Jr. | Nissan Silvia | 15 | GT300 | SUZ; 4 | FUJ; C | SEN; 2 | FUJ; Ret | MOT; 14 | MIN; Ret | SUG; 4 | | 6th | 35 |
| 1999 | Toyota Team Cerumo | Toyota Supra | 32 | GT500 | SUZ; 8 | FUJ; 6 | SUG; 6 | MIN; Ret | FUJ; Ret | TAI; 11 | MOT; 15 | | 16th | 12 |
| 2000 | Toyota Team Cerumo | Toyota Supra | 32 | GT500 | MOT; 11 | FUJ; Ret | SUG; 16 | FUJ; 19 | TAI; 11 | MIN; Ret | SUZ; 10 | | 23rd | 1 |
| 2001 | Toyota Team Cerumo with Ukyo | Toyota Supra | 33 | GT500 | TAI; 12 | FUJ; 14 | SUG; 13 | **FUJ**; 14 | MOT; 9 | SUZ; Ret | MIN; 13 | | 24th | 2 |
| 2002 | Toyota Team Cerumo | Toyota Supra | 33 | GT500 | TAI; 15 | FUJ | SUG; 9 | SEP; 7 | FUJ; 16 | MOT; 12 | MIN; 11 | SUZ; 13 | 21st | 6 |

=== 24 Hours of Le Mans results ===
| Year | Team | Co-Drivers | Car | Class | Laps | Pos. | Class Pos. |
|---|---|---|---|---|---|---|---|
| 1994 | (United Kingdom) A.D.A. Engineering Ltd. (Japan) Team Nippon | (Japan) Jun Harada (Japan) Tomiko Yoshikawa | Porsche 962C GTi | LMP1 /C90 | 189 | NC | NC |
| 1995 | (Japan) NISMO | (Japan) Hideo Fukuyama (Japan) Shunji Kasuya | Nissan Skyline GT-R LM | GT1 | 271 | 10th | 5th |
| 1996 | (Japan) NISMO | (Japan) Aguri Suzuki (Japan) Masahiko Kageyama | Nissan Skyline GT-R LM | GT1 | 209 | DNF | DNF |
| 2000 | (Japan) TV Asahi Team Dragon | (Japan) Keiichi Tsuchiya (Japan) Akira Iida | Panoz LMP-1 Roadster-S | LMP900 | 330 | 8th | 7th |
| 2001 | (France) Viper Team Oreca | (Japan) Seiji Ara (Portugal) Ni Amorim | Chrysler LMP | LMP900 | 243 | DNF | DNF |
| 2002 | (Japan) Kondo Racing | (United Kingdom) Ian McKellar Jr. (France) François Migault | Dome S101-Judd | LMP900 | 182 | DNF | DNF |
| 2003 | (Japan) Kondo Racing | (Japan) Ukyo Katayama (Japan) Ryo Fukuda | Dome S101-Mugen | LMP900 | 322 | 13th | 8th |

== Notes ==
1.Kondō did not met the requirement for minimum distance driven and was ineligible for championship points.

| Preceded by Toshihiko Tahara | Japan Record Award for Best New Artist; 1981 | Succeeded by Shibugakitai |
