= Kore de Yoroshikatta Deshō ka. =

Studio album by Rider Chips
- Released: November 11, 2009
- Genre: Hard rock, Blues rock
- Label: Rider Chips, Daiki Sound

Rider Chips chronology
Majimemashite. (2006)	Kore de Yoroshikatta Deshō ka. (2009)	Odorenarin (2011)

Singles from Kore de Yoroshikatta Deshō ka.
- 1. "Kodoku o Fumitsubuse" Released: August 1, 2008; 2. "Ride a firstway" Released: September 16, 2009

Kore de Yoroshikatta Deshō ka. (これでよろしかったでしょうか。, lit. That is, If You Don't Mind) is the third album by Japanese hard rock band Rider Chips, released November 11, 2009. It is the first of their albums released on their independent label, instead of through avex mode. The catalogue code for this album is RC-0002 and DAKRCC-2. The first presses of the album include a special version of the cover art.

== Track listing ==
No.	Title	Length
1.	"Pani Kuri" (パニくり)	4:56
2.	"Jump!"	4:18
3.	"Ride a firstway"	3:57
4.	"Masquerade" (マスカレード, Masukarēdo)	4:16
5.	"Broken' Hero"	5:07
6.	"Kodoku o Fumitsubuse" (孤独をふみつぶせ, "Trampled Solitude")	4:01
7.	"Shot me baby"	3:21
8.	"0⇔100MAN"	3:12
9.	"Your way"	3:29
10.	"Tomodachi" (ともだち, "Friends")	4:49
Total length:		41:23

== Personnel ==
- Yoshio Nomura – guitar
- Koichi Terasawa – bass
- Joe – drums
- Ricky – vocals
- Cher Watanabe – composition, keyboards
