= Takeshi's Challenge =

1986 video game

Takeshi no Chōsenjō
- Famicom box art
- Developers: Nova Co., Ltd.
- Publisher: Taito
- Designer: Takeshi Kitano
- Composer: Hiroshi Fukutsu
- Platforms: Famicom, iOS, Android
- Release: Famicom: JP: December 10, 1986; iOS, Android: JP: August 15, 2017
- Genre: Action-adventure
- Mode: Single-player

Takeshi no Chōsenjō (たけしの挑戦状; lit. Takeshi's Letter of Challenge), popularly known as Takeshi's Challenge, is a 1986 action-adventure video game developed by Nova and published by Taito for the Family Computer. The game was designed by Japanese entertainer Takeshi Kitano and is centered on a salaryman who seeks a treasure on a remote island in the South Seas. Takeshi no Chōsenjō has been negatively received in retrospect due to its unreasonable gameplay requirements that are difficult to clear without foresight.

== Gameplay ==
Screenshot of Takeshi no Chōsenjō

While the gameplay of Takeshi no Chōsenjō is presented as a side-scrolling action game, the narrative progresses according to the player's choices akin to an adventure game, making the game an example of an action-adventure. Shooter elements are also included in certain areas. The player controls a poor salaryman within an urban and decadent Japanese landscape, in which he is often attacked by hostile yakuza. Health can only be restored by either drinking tequila at a bar in Japan or sleeping at a hotel on Hintabo Island, although the salaryman can be revived upon depletion of his health if the player simultaneously taps the A and B buttons three times in quick succession. The salaryman can receive money by beating pedestrians or completing certain objectives.

The game's plot is initiated when the salaryman receives a treasure map. Before he can initiate the search for the treasure, the salaryman must prepare by beating the old man who gave him the map, divorcing his wife, resigning from his job, and acquiring various skills at the culture center. If these conditions are not met before the salaryman goes to Hintabo Island, his wife or company president will suddenly appear and forcibly repatriate him to Japan, or the treasure will be intercepted by the old man (who had followed the salaryman), resulting in a game over.

The game incorporates the microphone function of a second controller in various situations, primarily in the karaoke bar. In one stage, the salaryman must hang glide from Hintabo Island to the island of the hidden treasure while firing bullets at incoming birds and UFOs. The salaryman can only ascend using gusts of wind and can only fire one bullet at a time, and crashing into a single enemy results in a game over. The game uses a password-based save system, a common method for game saves at the time. The player can be taken to the final stage of the game if the salaryman throws 30,720 punches on the title screen.

== Development and release ==
The game's plot, where a despondent salaryman seeks to find a hidden treasure on an island, is introduced as having been created by Kitano while he was drunk at a bar. Kitano, however, explained that the plot was solely the result of an hour-long talk at a café near his production company.

The game's basis of being able to exert violence on all characters is similar to that of the Grand Theft Auto series, but many of Kitano's ideas were rejected either because of the limitations of the Famicom, or because the content was not suitable for young children. Two more games bearing Kitano's name were developed after Takeshi no Chōsenjō (Takeshi no Sengoku Fūunji and Family Trainer Totsugeki! Fūun Takeshijō), but Kitano himself was not involved in the development of either of these later games. Though Kitano was involved in a scandal concerning the Japanese gossip magazine Friday (see 1986 Friday magazine attack) on December 9, 1986, a day before the game's release, Takeshi no Chōsenjō was released as scheduled the following day. Two television commercials were created to advertise the game; one where Kitano is singing karaoke while playing the game, and another where he yells "Come out!" into the microphone on the Famicom's second controller to pull up a treasure map on the game screen. Both commercials are hints for completing the game. According to a Taito source, 800,000 copies were sold.

The game was rereleased on the Wii Virtual Console on March 31, 2009. The iOS and Android version titled Chōsenjō From Beat Takeshi (挑戦状 From Beat Takeshi) was released in Japan on August 15, 2017. This version includes widescreen support, a new stage taking place in America and new background music by Taito's sound team Zuntata.

== Reception ==
The game placed first in Famitsu magazine's kusoge (shitty game) ranking, and is often referred to as one of the worst video games of all time. According to video game researchers Douglas Wilson and Miguel Sicart:

Takeshi no Chousenjou stands out as an especially outrageous example of abusive game design because Kitano leveraged his fame to sucker players into buying the game ... Notably, the majority of these players were children – the very audience least equipped to understand Kitano's cruel humor.

On the other hand, it left a strong impact on some critics. In 2007, it was nominated for the 2007 Retro Game Award at the Tokyo Game Show, along with Spelunker, Adventure Island, and Ghosts 'n Goblins; Super Mario Bros. won the award.

== See also ==
- Takeshi's Castle
