= Tanokin Trio =

1980s Japanese entertainment group

Tanokin Trio (たのきんトリオ, Tanokin Torio) was a Japanese group, composed of three Johnny's idols, Toshihiko Tahara (Toshi), Yoshio Nomura (Yoshi), and Masahiko Kondo (Matchy). It was active for a short period in the early 1980s (dissolved on 28 August 1983), they became icons among young people of their generation. All three appeared as students in the first series of Kinpachi-sensei.

== Members ==
		Nickname	Color
Toshihiko Tahara (Leader)	February 28, 1961, Type B blood, Yamanashi Prefecture	Toshi (トシちゃん)	■Red
Yoshio Nomura	October 26, 1964, Type A blood, Tokyo	Yoshi (ヨッちゃん)	■Blue
Masahiko Kondo	July 19, 1964, Type O blood, Kanagawa Prefecture	Matchy (マッチ)	■Yellow

== Major casting works ==
=== Television ===
- Kinpachi-sensei (TBS)
  - The first series (October 26, 1979 - March 28, 1980)
  - The second series, episode 13 (December 26, 1980)
  - Special 1 (October 8, 1982)
  - Special 3 (October 5, 1984)
- Tadaima Hokago (ただいま放課後) (May 26 - September 19, 1980, Fuji TV)
- 幕末花の美剣士たち (January 4, 1981, TV Tokyo)

=== Variety ===
- Tanokin Zenryoku Tokyu (たのきん全力投球!) (October 9, 1980 - March 27, 1983, TBS)

=== Film ===
==== Tanokin Super Hit Series ====
- Graffiti Youth: Sneaker Blues (February 11, 1981)
- Blue Jeans Memory (July 11, 1981)
- Good Luck Love (December 20, 1981)
- Highteen Boogie (August 7, 1982)
- The Mysterious Gemini • Y&S (December 11, 1982)
- Heart Beat (August 4, 1983)

=== Stage ===
- サヨナラ日劇FESTIVAL (February 11, 1981, Japan Theater)
- たのきんスーパースリー 桜島野外コンサート (typhoon in March 1981, canceled)
- たのきん3球コンサート (August 1981, August 1983)

=== Songs ===
- 君に贈る言葉 （アフター・スクール） (B side of Toshihiko Tahara's "Sorrowful Heart")
- ときめきはテレパシー (insert in the movie Good Luck Love)

=== Video ===
- たのきんHOTライブ (November 5, 1980, Pony Canyon)
- 3球コンサート 1983・8・28 大阪スタヂアム (1983)

=== Cassette tape & photo collection ===
- Takenokin Live '81 (July 8, 1981, Shueisha)
  - Side A
    - 哀愁メドレー（哀愁でいと～レッツゴー・ダンシング～ファンキー・モンキー・ベイビー～ルイジアナママ～哀愁トゥ・ナイト～哀愁でいと）
    - スニーカーぶる～す
    - 月の灯り
    - ある日曜日の出来事
    - Rockn Rollメドレー（恋のゴーカート～悲しき雨音～ハッピーバースデースウィート16～ダイアナ）
  - Side B
    - コール・ミー
    - 雨が降ってきた
    - ラストダンスは私と
    - しらけちまうぜ
    - ハッとして Good!
    - ヨコハマ・チーク
    - 恋はDo！
    - 君にこのうたを

== Awards and nominations ==
Year	Award	Category	Nominee(s)	Result	Ref.
1980	18th Golden Arrow Award	Popularity Award	Tanokin Trio	Won	
1982	20th Golden Arrow Award	Super Idol Award	Tanokin Trio	Won	
