= 1985 in Japanese television =

Events in 1985 in Japanese television.

== Debuts ==
Show	Station	Premiere Date	Genre	Original Run
Blue Comet SPT Layzner	Nippon Television	October 3	anime	October 3, 1985 – June 26, 1986
Dengeki Sentai Changeman	TV Asahi	February 2	tokusatsu	February 2, 1985 - February 22, 1986
High School! Kimengumi	Fuji TV	October 12	anime	October 12, 1985 - September 26, 1987
Dancouga - Super Beast Machine God	TBS	April 5	anime	April 5, 1985 – December 27, 1985
Dirty Pair	Nippon TV	July 15	anime	July 15, 1985 – December 26, 1985
Kyojuu Tokusou Juspion			tokusatsu	
Musashi no Ken	TV Tokyo	April 18	anime	April 18, 1985 – September 26, 1986
Ponytail wa Furimukanai			drama	
Shadow Warriors IV			drama	
Shadow Warriors V			drama	
Sukeban Deka			tokusatsu/drama	
Sukeban Deka II: Shojo Tekkamen Densetsu			tokusatsu/drama	
Touch			anime	

== Ongoing ==
- Music Fair, music (1964–present)
- Mito Kōmon, jidaigeki (1969-2011)
- Sazae-san, anime (1969–present)
- Ōoka Echizen, jidaigeki (1970-1999)
- FNS Music Festival, music (1974-present)
- Panel Quiz Attack 25, game show (1975–present)
- Doraemon, anime (1979-2005)
- Dr. Slump - Arale-chan, anime (1981-1986)
- Urusei Yatsura, anime (1981-1986)

== Endings ==
Show	Station	End Date	Genre	Original Run
Adventures of the Little Koala			anime	
Attacker You!			anime	
Bismark	Nippon TV	September 29th	anime	October 7, 1984 – September 29, 1985
Cat’s Eye	Nippon TV	July 8th	anime	July 11, 1983 – July 8, 1985
Choudenshi Bioman	TV Asahi	January 26	tokusatsu	February 4, 1984 – January 26, 1985
Dancouga - Super Beast Machine God	TBS	December 27	anime	April 5, 1985 – December 27, 1985
Dirty Pair	Nippon TV	December 26	anime	July 15, 1985 – December 26, 1985
Hachiji da yo! Zen'in shūgō	TBS	September 28	comedy	October 4, 1969 – September 28, 1985
Shadow Warriors IV			drama	
Shadow Warriors V			drama	
Sherlock Hound	TV Asahi	May 21st	anime	November 6, 1984 – May 21, 1985
Uchuu Keiji Shaider			tokusatsu	

== See also ==
- 1985 in anime
- List of Japanese television dramas
- 1985 in Japan
- List of Japanese films of 1985
