= Guinea Pig (film series) =

Horror film series

- Created by: Satoru Ogura; Hideshi Hino
- Original work: Guinea Pig: Devil's Experiment (1985)

Print publications
- Comics: Manga by Hideshi Hino

Films and television
- Films: List of films

Guinea Pig (ギニーピッグ, Ginī Piggu) is a Japanese exploitation horror (and later, black comedy) series consisting of six films and two making-of documentaries. The series' original concept was conceived by manga artist Hideshi Hino (who wrote and directed two films in the series). The series primarily focuses on graphic violence, gore, mutilation, torture, and murder.

The Guinea Pig series has sparked controversy for its depictions of violence. One or more entries in the series were suspected of influencing Tsutomu Miyazaki, a serial killer who kidnapped and murdered four young girls. The second film in the series, Guinea Pig 2: Flower of Flesh and Blood, was reportedly withdrawn from the market and has achieved particular notoriety because of an incident in which American actor Charlie Sheen is said to have watched the film and believed it depicted the actual killing and dismemberment of a real woman, prompting him to report it to authorities.

The Guinea Pig films were released on DVD by distributor Unearthed Films. As a tribute to the Japanese film series, Unearthed Films began producing a series of horror films titled American Guinea Pig.

== Films ==
=== Devil's Experiment (1985) ===
Guinea Pig: Devil's Experiment (ギニーピッグ 悪魔の実験, Ginī Piggu: Akuma no Jikken; a.k.a. "Unabridged Agony") is a 1985 film directed by Satoru Ogura, and the first entry in the series. The film depicts a group of men who kidnap and graphically torture a young woman in a variety of ways—including hitting, kicking, and pinching her with pliers; forcing her to endure sound torture; burning her with hot oil; pouring maggots and offal on her; hanging her in a net; and piercing a needle through one of her eyes.

=== Flower of Flesh and Blood (1985) ===
Guinea Pig 2: Flower of Flesh and Blood (ギニーピッグ2 血肉の華, Ginī Piggu 2: Chiniku no Hana) is a 1985 film written and directed by Hideshi Hino, based on his horror manga works, and is the second entry in the series. The plot revolves around a man dressed as a samurai who drugs and abducts a woman, takes her to his home, dismembers her, and adds her body parts to a collection.

This entry in the series has been called "notorious". It sparked controversy over its graphic content and was reportedly withdrawn from the market after being reviewed by several Japanese boards of education. It was also suspected of influencing serial killer Tsutomu Miyazaki—also known as the Otaku Murderer—who abducted and murdered four young girls in the Saitama and Tokyo prefectures. Miyazaki had an extensive collection of videotapes, many of which were horror films; one of the Guinea Pig films was reported to have been found in Miyazaki's collection, though writer-director Hino has asserted that it was the fourth film, Mermaid in a Manhole, not Flower of Flesh and Blood.

In 1991, American actor Charlie Sheen reportedly obtained a copy of the film from film writer and critic Chris Gore. After watching it, Sheen became convinced that the film portrayed a genuine snuff film depicting the dismemberment and killing of a woman. Alarmed, he quickly reported it to authorities. As a result, the Federal Bureau of Investigation (FBI) allegedly opened an inquiry into the individuals involved in the film's production and distribution. However, the investigation was later dropped when it was demonstrated that special effects had been used to simulate the violence in the film. This incident, often recounted by hardcore fans of horror films, has been compared to an urban legend, and later inspired the song "Charlie Sheen Reaches Out to the Feds", by the Mountain Goats.

=== He Never Dies (1986) ===
Guinea Pig 3: Shudder! The Man Who Never Dies (ギニーピッグ3 戦慄! 死なない男, Ginī Piggu 3: Senritsu! Shinanai Otoko), also known as Guinea Pig 3: He Never Dies, is a 1986 film directed by Masayuki Hisazumi (or Masayuki Kusumi). After an introduction given by an American reporter discussing strange cases from around the world, the story begins, centering around an unlucky salaryman named Hideshi. One evening, Hideshi attempts to slit his wrists, and finds that he cannot feel pain. He then discovers that he has somehow become immortal, and invites a co-worker to his home, asking that he bring sharp gardening utensils with him. When his co-worker arrives, Hideshi plays a practical joke on him by using the tools to mutilate himself, then ends up decapitating himself with a set of gardening shears, terrifying the co-worker to the point of fainting during the ordeal. Eventually, the co-worker's girlfriend enters Hideshi's apartment to see why her fiancé was taking so long, only to find Hideshi's still-living head on a blood-spattered coffee table. Rather than being scared by the gory scene, the girlfriend is confused by how Hideshi is still alive. She goes to wake her boyfriend, and then the two begin to clean the apartment so Hideshi doesn't get in trouble with his landlord. As the others get to work cleaning, Hideshi announces that he has become more confident, and would like to return to his job the next day.

Though He Never Dies features graphic imagery, it is more darkly comedic in tone than its predecessors and its successors except Devil Woman Doctor.

=== Mermaid in a Manhole (1988) ===
Guinea Pig: Mermaid in a Manhole (ギニーピッグ マンホールの中の人魚, Ginī Piggu: Manhōru no Naka no Ningyo) is a 1988 film written and directed by Hideshi Hino, based again on his horror manga works. Sources differ on whether it is the fourth or sixth film in the series. In a 2009 interview with Vice, Hino said that he had "nothing to do with" the fourth Guinea Pig film, implying that he does not consider Mermaid in a Manhole to be the fourth entry in the series. However, Stephen Biro, co-founder of the home video distribution company Unearthed Films, listed Mermaid in a Manhole as the fourth film in the series. In his book The Encyclopedia of Japanese Horror Films, Salvador Jimenez Murguía claims that it was "the sixth Guinea Pig film to be produced, although it was released fourth."

The plot of Mermaid in a Manhole follows an artist who has become estranged from his wife. One day while visiting the sewers beneath the street, he encounters a mermaid that he had once met as a child. After noticing that she has boils growing on her body, the artist offers to help her and brings the mermaid to his house to continue illustrating her. Over time, her illness gets worse, and eventually she begins suffering the symptoms of a horrendous infestation in which countless worms of various sizes burst out of the boils on her body. On the verge of death, she begs the artist to kill her, and he does, stabbing her to death, then dismembering her body. Later, the artist's two neighbors, who were intrigued by what the artist had been doing after one of them found a fish head in the trash, go to investigate, but flee after they come across the artist holding the pieces of the mermaid while listlessly singing about her death.

When the local police take control of the scene and investigate, they find that instead of the dismembered body being that of a mermaid, it is that of a human woman. The neighbors are interviewed, and everyone suspects the artist to have killed his wife, a statement which the investigation finds to be true; hallucinating, the schizophrenic artist had murdered his wife, who had been suffering from stomach cancer. Now imprisoned, the artist sits, manically muttering to himself about how he was sure he had killed the mermaid. Yet, despite all the evidence against it, a single scale was found in the bathtub in the artist's house, belonging to an unidentified species.

Unlike its predecessors, Mermaid in a Manhole is more of a body horror film, has more of a storyline, and has a tone that is significantly more poignant and falls more into the tragedy genre than the other films in the series. For these reasons, Mermaid in a Manhole is generally considered to be one of the best films in the series and is a fan favorite.

=== Android of Notre Dame (1988) ===
Guinea Pig: Android of Notre Dame (ギニーピッグ ノートルダムのアンドロイド, Ginī Piggu: Nōtorudamu no Andoroido) is a 1988 film directed by Kazuhito Kuramoto. It revolves around a scientist who tries to find a cure for his sister's grave illness. The scientist needs a "guinea pig" to perform experiments on. A stranger approaches the scientist, offering a body for the experiments, for which the scientist will pay. When the experiments do not go well, the scientist becomes enraged and hacks the body to pieces. The stranger approaches the scientist again and supplies another body so the experiments can continue.

=== Devil Woman Doctor (1986) ===
Guinea Pig: Devil Woman Doctor (ギニーピッグ ピーターの悪魔の女医さん, Ginī Piggu: Pītā no Akuma no Joi-san) is a 1986 film directed by Hajime Tabe. Much like Mermaid in a Manhole, sources differ on whether Devil Woman Doctor is the fourth or sixth entry in the series. The front cover art for the VHS release of the film by Sai Enterprise describes it as the fourth film in the series. According to Salvador Jimenez Murguía: "despite being chronologically labeled as the fourth in the series, Devil Woman Doctor is often referred to as the final Guinea Pig film."

Devil Woman Doctor tells the story of a female doctor played by Japanese drag actor Peter. The film takes the form of several vignettes in which she encounters numerous patients, including a family whose heads explode if they get upset and a woman whose heart explodes when she becomes scared, a man with dissociative identity disorder who finds a new life as a street comedian, a yakuza member who has a sentient tumor with a human face growing on his stomach, and a zombie who lives a relatively normal life with his still-living girlfriend. The doctor then saves a woman from an animate internal organ before meeting a man who sweats blood, and attempts to remove a living tattoo from another patient, who she eventually has to flay alive to finally remove the troublesome ink. In the final scene, a group of four men discuss their particularly bizarre conditions. The first patient produces soybean paste under his feet and can spit eggs containing infant aliens from his mouth, the second has an elastic penis, the third constantly emits smoke from his body, and the fourth has a heart which moves around inside him. The Devil Woman Doctor then arrives on the scene and proclaims to the audience that each of the four conditions presented by the patients is incurable. As the credits roll, several of the film's characters hit each other with metal discs coated in sharp metal spikes, causing large amounts of blood to spurt from them, though no one appears to be seriously injured despite the graphic scene. Rather than horror, the tone of this installment is more akin to extremely violent and surreal slapstick comedy.

== Other releases ==
An arm prosthesis used in He Never Dies shown in the Making of Guinea Pig documentary.

=== Making-of documentaries ===
In 1986, Making of Guinea Pig (Meikingu obu Za Ginipiggu), a making-of documentary about the production of the first three Guinea Pig films, was released. The existence of behind-the-scenes footage demonstrating special effects used in the Guinea Pig series is thought to have assuaged fears about the Guinea Pig films being snuff films.

Making of Devil Woman Doctor (Bangaihen: Akumano Joi-san Meikingu), a behind-the-scenes look at the production of Devil Woman Doctor, was released in 1990.

=== Slaughter Special (1991) ===
In 1991, Guinea Pig: Slaughter Special (ギニーピッグ 惨殺スペシャル, Ginī Piggu: Zansatsu Supessharu), a "best-of" special which showcases highlights from the series, was released.

== Home media ==
In the 1980s, the Guinea Pig films were released on VHS by a variety of companies, including Midnight 25 Video, Japan Home Video, MAD Video, and Sai Enterprise.

In the early 2000s, distributor Unearthed Films released the Guinea Pig films and the associated making-of documentaries on DVD. Each release was a double feature containing two films: Devil's Experiment / Android of Notre Dame, Mermaid in a Manhole / He Never Dies, Flower of Flesh and Blood / Making of Guinea Pig, and Devil Woman Doctor / Making of Devil Woman Doctor. The following year, Unearthed Films released a DVD box set containing the six Guinea Pig films, the two making-of documentaries, and the Slaughter Special.

== Legacy ==
As a tribute to the Guinea Pig series, Unearthed Films began producing a horror film series known as American Guinea Pig. The films in this series are as follows: American Guinea Pig: Bouquet of Guts and Gore (2014), American Guinea Pig: Bloodshock (2015), American Guinea Pig: The Song of Solomon (2017), and American Guinea Pig: Sacrifice (2017).

== See also ==
- Japanese horror

=== Bibliography ===
- Harper, Jim (2009). Flowers from Hell: The Modern Japanese Horror Film. Noir Publishing. p. 35. ISBN 978-0953656479.
- McRoy, Jay (2007). Nightmare Japan: Contemporary Japanese Horror Cinema. Rodopi. ISBN 978-9042023314.
- Murguía, Salvador Jimenez (2016). The Encyclopedia of Japanese Horror Films. Rowman & Littlefield. ISBN 978-1442261662.
