= Guinea Pig 2: Flower of Flesh and Blood =

1985 Japanese film

- VHS cover

Japanese name
- Kanji: ギニーピッグ2 血肉の華
Transcriptions
- Revised Hepburn: Ginī Piggu 2: Chiniku no Hana
- Directed by: Hideshi Hino
- Written by: Hideshi Hino
- Starring: Hiroshi Tamura; Kirara Yūgao
- Release date: 1985
- Running time: 42 minutes
- Country: Japan
- Language: Japanese

Guinea Pig 2: Flower of Flesh and Blood (Japanese: ギニーピッグ2 血肉の華, Hepburn: Ginī Piggu 2: Chiniku no Hana) is a 1985 Japanese splatter horror film written and directed by Hideshi Hino. The second film in the Guinea Pig film series, it is based on a manga by Hino, and stars Hiroshi Tamura and Kirara Yūgao. The film's plot concerns a man dressed as a samurai who drugs and kidnaps a woman, and proceeds to take her to his home, where he dismembers her and adds her body parts to a collection.

Guinea Pig 2 garnered controversy both in Japan and in the United States. The film was reportedly withdrawn from the home video market, and was suspected to have been an influence on Tsutomu Miyazaki, a serial killer who abducted and murdered four young girls. Despite this, upon release, Guinea Pig 2 positioned itself on the list of top ten video releases in Japan for two months straight. American actor Charlie Sheen is said to have watched the film and became convinced that it genuinely depicted the killing and dismemberment of an actual woman, prompting him to contact authorities. Investigations were dropped after the special effects used to simulate the violence depicted in the film were able to be demonstrated.

The film is also known by a number of other titles which vary slightly, including Guinea Pig 2: Flowers of Flesh and Blood.

== Cast ==
- Hiroshi Tamura as Samurai
- Kirara Yūgao as Victim

== Reception ==
Tomo Kosuga of Vice called the film a "gore-fest non-pareil that looks as genuine and terrifying today as it did in 1985." Jason Wojnar of Screen Rant called Guinea Pig 2 the "most notorious" of the Guinea Pig series, noting that those who have seen it "wouldn't fault" someone for thinking it was an actual snuff film. Similarly, J. Doyle Wallis of DVD Talk called it "one of the more notorious" entries in the series. He had mixed feelings towards the film's "hit and miss" special effects, referring to them as "sometimes impressive like the hands being cut off and the severed head, sometimes obviously fake like the severed leg and the icepick stabbed in unconvincing skin."

In his book Flowers from Hell: The Modern Japanese Horror Film, Jim Harper referred to the special effects and production values of Guinea Pig 2 as being superior to those of the first Guinea Pig film, but wrote that "the effects are largely unconvincing, and the cumulative effect is more likely to provoke boredom and irritation than genuine horror." In his book Horror and the Horror Film, Bruce F. Kawin wrote that Guinea Pig 2 "presents the bloody, drugged dismemberment for its own sake, encouraging the viewer either to squirm or to discover a compelling beauty in it [...] It is an experiment in declaring a beauty in horror, although it admits that the artist who perceives, controls and presents that beauty is insane."

== Controversies ==
=== Censorship ===
After the film was examined by boards of education throughout Japan, all copies of Guinea Pig 2 were supposedly withdrawn from the market. In a 2009 interview with Vice, writer-director Hideshi Hino stated that he considered the withdrawal to be "a great success."

In 1992, a 26-year-old British man named Christopher Berthoud was fined £600 for importing a copy of Guinea Pig 2. The prosecution in the case argued that, although the film did not feature footage of an actual homicide, it nevertheless can be categorized as "a snuff video" because it "is so well simulated that that is the impression it creates".

=== "Copycat" crimes ===
Between 1988 and 1989, Japanese serial killer Tsutomu Miyazaki—also known as the Otaku Murderer—abducted, mutilated and murdered four young girls, and sexually molested their corpses. After he was apprehended, it was discovered that Miyazaki had an extensive collection of videotapes, including a number of horror films. Miyazaki allegedly re-enacted scenes from Guinea Pig 2 when committing his crimes, and reportedly claimed to have been inspired by such media. As a result, the Tokyo Metropolitan Government attempted to cite the Guinea Pig series as an example of needed restraint in regards to depictions of violence in Japanese entertainment. However, much of the blame is said to have been placed on the whole of Japanese culture at the time for "creating a society that bred such a [violent] mentality".

According to Hino, the police force of Fukagawa, Tokyo were notified about Guinea Pig 2 after a number of people "thought that the killer may have watched and then imitated" scenes from the film. Hino has stated that the fourth Guinea Pig film (a film that he noted he "had nothing to do with") was discovered in Miyazaki's video collection, rather than Guinea Pig 2. He said:

Unfortunately, the Fukagawa Police viewed Guinea Pig 2 just before arresting Miyazaki. They didn't know Guinea Pig was a series, so as soon as they heard a Guinea Pig video had been found they thought it was Guinea Pig 2. The Fukagawa Police reported to the press corps that they'd found my movie in the room. By that evening the misinformation was widespread.

=== Snuff film allegations ===
In the early 1990s, American film critic Chris Gore purportedly met actor Charlie Sheen, and gave Sheen a copy of Guinea Pig 2. After watching the film, Sheen is said to have become convinced that it was a snuff film depicting the actual murder and dismemberment of a real woman, and reported it to authorities. The Federal Bureau of Investigation (FBI) launched an inquiry into those involved in the production and distribution of Guinea Pig 2—including Charles Balun, an early distributor who asserted that the film did not feature footage of a genuine homicide, and Hino. The FBI reputedly confiscated Sheen's copy of the film, but after they viewed a making-of documentary that demonstrated the special effects used to simulate the violence depicted in the film, the investigation was dropped.

In his book Nightmare Japan: Contemporary Japanese Horror Cinema, Jay McRoy wrote that the incident involving Sheen "has been recounted so frequently among 'hard core' aficionados of world horror cinema that, with each re-telling, it comes closer and closer to assuming 'urban legend' status". Balun has referred to the incident as "the new Urban Myth", and claimed that he was never contacted by the FBI regarding the film. In 2026, the American indie band The Mountain Goats released a song inspired by the story entitled "Charlie Sheen Reaches Out to the Feds."
