= Toshihiko Tahara =

Japanese singer (born 1961)

- Also known as: Toshi, Toshi-chan
- Born: February 28, 1961 (age 65); Yokosuka, Kanagawa Prefecture
- Origin: Kofu, Yamanashi Prefecture, Japan
- Genres: J-pop, Idol Kayōkyoku
- Occupations: singer, actor, tarento
- Years active: 1979–present
- Labels: Universal Music Japan, Pony Canyon
- Website: Official website

YouTube information
- Channel: TOSHIHIKO TAHARA Official YouTube Channel
- Years active: 2019 -
- Subscribers: 22.9 thousand
- Views: 6.4 million
- Last updated: January 15, 2024

Toshihiko Tahara (田原俊彦; born February 28, 1961) is a Japanese idol singer, and solo vocalist, affiliated with Johnny & Associates. In the 1980s he had a number of number 1 singles in Japan. He was awarded a Japan Music Award in 1983 for the song "Saraba... Natsu" (さらば・・・夏). He was part of the Tanokin Trio.

== Biography ==
Tahara is from Kofu, the capital city of Yamanashi Prefecture. He started acting in 1978, and officially debuted in June 1980, aged 19, with his first single 哀愁でいと(NEW YORK CITY NIGHTS), which made it to no. 2 in the Oricon Chart. Tahara was noted for his dancing skills, which he showed during songs like "Dakishimete Tonight" (抱きしめてTONIGHT) (1988) and "Kakkotsukanai ne" (かっこつかないね) (1988). In 1983 at the age of 22, he was featured in a 40" minute dance show and music documentary Love Forever directed by Umetsugu Inoue.

Tahara was invited to perform in the prestigious NHK year-end programme Kōhaku Uta Gassen from 1980 to 1986.

He made a comeback, 33 years after his debut, in June 2012 with the release of his 68th single, titled "Mr. Big". On June 19, 2013, he released his first original album in 15 years. In 2014, he celebrated the 35th anniversary of his debut.

== Discography ==
=== Singles ===
Year	Album	Chart positions (JP)	Label
1980	"Pashuu Date" (哀愁でいと)	2	NAV
1980	"Ha Toshite! Good" (ハッとして!Good)	1	Canyon
1981	"Koi wa Do!" (恋はDo!)	1	Canyon
1981	"Bugi Ugi I Love You" (ブギ浮ぎI LOVE YOU)	2	Canyon
1981	"Kimi ni Kettei!" (キミに決定!)	2	Canyon
1981	"Kanashimi 2(Too) Young" (悲しみ2(TOO)ヤング)	2	Canyon
1981	"Goodluck Love" (グッドラックLOVE)	3	Canyon
1982	"Kimi ni Bara Bara...to iu Kanji" (君に薔薇薔薇…という感じ)	3	Canyon
1982	"Harajuku Kiss" (原宿キッス)	1	Canyon
1982	"Ninjin Musume" (NINJIN娘)	2	Canyon
1982	"Yuuwaku Suresure" (誘惑スレスレ)	1	Canyon
1982	"Love Spour" (ラブ・シュプール)	3	Canyon
1983	"Pierrot" (ピエロ)	1	Canyon
1983	"Shower na Kibun" (シャワーな気分)	1	Canyon
1983	"Saraba...Natsu" (さらば‥夏)	1	Canyon
1983	"L All Way Ai N G" (エル・オー・ヴイ・愛・N・G)	1	Canyon
1984	"Charleston ni wa Mada Hayai" (チャールストンにはまだ早い)	2	Canyon
1984	"Kishidou" (騎士道)	1	Canyon
1984	"Kao ni Kaita Romance" (顔に書いた恋愛小説 (ロマンス))	1	Canyon
1984	"Last Scene wa Ude no Naka de" (ラストシーンは腕の中で)	2	Canyon
1985	"Ginga no Shinwa" (銀河の神話)	2	Canyon
1985	"Ochinaide Madonna" (堕ちないでマドンナ)	3	Canyon
1985	"Karei naru Kake" (華麗なる賭け)	1	Canyon
1985	"It's BAD"	4	Canyon
1986	"Hard ni Yasashiku" (Hardにやさしく)	8	Canyon
1986	"Belle Époque ni Yoroshiku" (ベルエポックによろしく)	2	Canyon
1986	"Ah" (あッ)	3	Canyon
1987	"Kid"	3	Canyon
1987	"Sayonara kara Hajimeyou" (“さようなら”からはじめよう)	4	Canyon
1987	"Dousuru?" (どうする?)	3	Canyon
1988	"Yume de Aimashou" (夢であいましょう)	8	Pony Canyon
1988	"Dakishimete Tonight" (抱きしめてTONIGHT)	3	Pony Canyon
1988	"Kakkotsukanaine" (かっこつかないね)	2	Pony Canyon
1989	"Aishisugite" (愛しすぎて)	4	Pony Canyon
1989	"Gomen yo Namida" (ごめんよ 涙)	1	Pony Canyon
1989	"Hitoribocchi ni Shinai kara" (ひとりぼっちにしないから)	4	Pony Canyon
1990	"Jungle Jungle" (ジャングルJungle)	10	Pony Canyon
1990	"Nude"	16	Pony Canyon
1991	"Natsu Imasara Hito Mebore" (夏いまさら一目惚れ)	18	Pony Canyon
1992	"Omoide ni Makenai" (思い出に負けない)	25	Pony Canyon
1992	"Ame ga Sakenderu" (雨が叫んでる)	8	Pony Canyon
1993	"Dancing Beast" (ダンシング・ビースト)	29	Pony Canyon
1993	"Kiss de Onna wa Bara ni naru" (KISSで女は薔薇になる)	27	Pony Canyon
1994	"Yuki no nai Christmas" (雪のないクリスマス)	59	Pony Canyon
1995	"Tamashii wo Ai ga Shihaisuru" (魂を愛が支配する)	94	Pony Canyon
1996	"Mayonaka no One Call" (真夜中のワンコール)	86	Pony Canyon
1996	"DA・DI・DA"	71	Pony Canyon
1997	"A Night to Remember"	100	Pony Canyon
1997	"Easy Love Me"	80	Gauss
1998	"Kimi ni Ochiteyukeru" (キミニオチテユクる)	-	Gauss
1999	"Namida ni Sayonara shinaika" (涙にさよならしないか)	-	Gauss
2001	"Dakishimete Iidesuka" (抱きしめていいですか)	-	Hit Vibe
2002	"DO-YO"	-	Hit Vibe
2004	"Dangan Love: Dangan Ai" (DANGAN LOVE-弾丸愛-)	98	Gauss
2005	"Nega wo Hoshi no Yoru he..." (願いを星の夜へ‥‥)	-	Gauss
2006	"Jirashite Kajitsu" (ジラシテ果実)	-	Tokuma Japan
2009	"Cordially"	199	JVC
2010	"Cinderella" (シンデレラ)	125	Formula Recordings
2010	"Rainy X'mas Day"	94	Formula Recordings
2011	"Sayonara Loneliness" (さよならloneliness)	70	Formula Recordings
2011	"Blue" (featuring Luv and Soul)	113	Formula Recordings
2011	"Himawari/Hoshi no You ni" (ヒマワリ/星のように)	35	Formula Recordings
2012	"Mr.Big"	26	Formula Recordings
2014	"Love & Dream" featuring Sky-Hi/Bonita	30	Formula Recordings
2015	"Back to the 90's"	20	Formula Recordings
2015	"True Love: Yakusoku no Ai" (TRUE LOVE〜約束の歌〜)	26	Formula Recordings
2016	"Tokimeki ni Uso wo Tsuku" (ときめきに嘘をつく)	28	Formula Recordings
2017	"Feminist" (フェミニスト)	21	Universal Music Japan
2018	"Escort to My World"	28	Universal Music Japan
2019	"Suki ni Natteshimai soudayo" (好きになってしまいそうだよ)	23	Universal Music Japan
2020	"Ai wa Ai de Ai da" (愛は愛で愛だ)	17	Lighthouse Music
2021	"Ha-Ha-Happy"	11	Lighthouse Music
2022	"Romantist de Ii Janai" (ロマンティストでいいじゃない)	20	Lighthouse Music
2023	"Dandelion" (ダンディライオン)	23	Lighthouse Music
2024	"Ai dake Arena Ii" (愛だけがあればいい)	11	Universal Music Japan
2025	"Life Is a Carnival"	8	Universal Music Japan
2026	"Nanikobe Saiko!!!" (ナニコレ最高!!!)	10	Universal Music Japan

==== DVD singles ====
Year	Album	Chart positions (JP)	Label
2006	"Always You"	-	JVC

==== Collaboration singles ====
Year	Album	Chart positions (JP)	Label
1985	"Natsu Sagari Hono Jigumi" (夏ざかりほの字組): with Naoko Ken (released as "Toshi & Naoko")	5	Canyon
2004	"Koisure to Janana" (恋すれどシャナナ): with Naoko Ken (released as "Tahara Toshi & Ken Naoko")	123	Gauss

=== Albums ===
==== Studio albums ====
Title	Album details	Peak chart positions
Title	Album details	JPN Oricon
Tahara Toshihiko (田原俊彦)	Released: 5 August 1980; Label: Canyon; Formats: CD, LP, Cassette tape	1
TOSHI'81	Released: 13 December 1980; Label: Canyon; Formats: CD, LP, Cassette tape	1
No.3 Shine Toshi	Released: 24 June 1981; Label: Canyon; Formats: CD, LP, Cassette tape	2
Natsu Ichiban (夏一番)	Released: 27 March 1982; Label: Canyon; Formats: CD, LP, Cassette tape	2
Eve only	Released: 27 January 1983; Label: Canyon; Formats: CD, LP, Cassette tape	1
Nami ni Kieta Love Story (波に消えたラブ・ストーリー)	Released: 21 July 1983; Label: Canyon; Formats: CD, LP, Cassette tape	1
Silhouette kara no Tegami (ジュリエットからの手紙)	Released: 21 March 1984; Label: Canyon; Formats: CD, LP, Cassette tape	3
Märchen (メルヘン)	Released: 21 June 1984; Label: Canyon; Formats: CD, LP, Cassette tape	3
TOSHI 10R NEW YORK	Released: 21 November 1984; Label: Canyon; Formats: CD, LP, Cassette tape	2
Don't Disturb	Released: 4 July 1985; Label: Canyon; Formats: CD, LP, Cassette tape	6
Shitsuren Bigaku (失恋美学)	Released: 15 December 1985; Label: Canyon; Formats: CD, LP, Cassette tape	11
Otoko...Itai (男…痛い)	Released: 19 June 1986; Label: Canyon; Formats: CD, LP, Cassette tape	6
Me de Korosu (目で殺す)	Released: 5 December 1986; Label: Canyon; Formats: CD, LP, Cassette tape	17
Yesterday My Love	Released: 21 May 1987; Label: Canyon; Formats: CD, LP, Cassette tape	8
Dancin'	Released: 13 July 1988; Label: Pony Canyon; Formats: CD, LP, Cassette tape	5
Tokyo Beat	Released: 17 May 1989; Label: Pony Canyon; Formats: CD, LP, Cassette tape	8
DOUBLE“T”	Released: 21 June 1990; Label: Pony Canyon; Formats: CD, Cassette tape	12
Natsu no Ousama: My Blue Heaven (夏の王様 〜MY BLUE HEAVEN〜)	Released: 5 June 1991; Label: Pony Canyon; Formats: CD, Cassette tape	17
Gently	Released: 2 September 1992; Label: Pony Canyon; Formats: CD	24
More Electric	Released: 4 August 1993; Label: Pony Canyon; Formats: CD	39
Tenderness	Released: 6 August 1995; Label: Pony Canyon; Formats: CD	83
Vintage 37	Released: 23 July 1998; Label: Gauss; Formats: CD	-
I Am Me!	Released: 19 September 2013; Label: Formula Recordings; Formats: CD	24

==== Cover albums ====
Title	Album details	Peak chart positions
Title	Album details	JPN Oricon
My Favorite Songs	Released: 18 November 1994; Label: Pony Canyon; Formats: CD	-

==== Self-cover albums ====
Title	Album details	Peak chart positions
Title	Album details	JPN Oricon
♥'MOTTO+MS005	Released: 20 June 2007; Label: Gauss; Formats: CD	-

==== Compilation albums ====
Title	Album details	Peak chart positions
Title	Album details	JPN Oricon
Best of Tahara Toshihiko (ベストオブ田原俊彦)	Released: 1 September 1982; Label: Canyon; Formats: LP, Cassette tape	1
Single A/B Side Collection (田原俊彦A/B面コレクション)	Released: 19 June 1986; Label: Canyon; Formats: CD	19 (A-Side); 28 (B-Side)
NON-STOP TOSHI	Released: 21 February 1988; Label: Canyon; Formats: CD	30
Thank You, for GLORIOUS HITS36 in 10years	Released: 22 November 1989; Label: Pony Canyon; Formats: CD	17
BEST 1987-1991	Released: 21 November 1991; Label: Pony Canyon; Formats: CD	85
Presents: The Greatest Hits in 15 years	Released: 24 July 1994; Label: Pony Canyon; Formats: CD	43
Best of Toshihiko Tahara	Released: 18 February 1998; Label: Pony Canyon; Formats: CD	-
Dynamite Survival	Released: 24 July 2003; Label: Gauss; Formats: CD	-
My Collection Tahara Toshihiko (Myこれ!クション田原俊彦)	Released: 21 January 2004; Label: Pony Canyon; Formats: CD	-
30th Anniversary BEST	Released: 1 September 2010; Label: Formula Recordings; Formats: CD+DVD	-
35th Anniversary All Singles Best 1980-2014	Released: 6 August 2014; Label: Formula Recordings; Formats: CD	-
Original Single Collection 1980-2021	Released: 18 August 2021; Label: Lighthouse Music; Formats: CD	24

=== Music Awards ===
- 1983: Japan Music Award — for the song "Saraba... Natsu" (さらば・・・夏)

== Videography ==
=== Live albums ===
	Release	Title	Format	Chart
1st	1983.8.4.	Forever Toshi	VHS	—N/a

=== Music-video albums ===
	Release	Title	Format	Chart
1st	1984.10.1	Märchen	VHS	—N/a

== Filmography ==
=== Film ===
==== Tanokin Super Hit Series ====
- Graffiti Youth: Sneaker Blues (February 11, 1981)
- Blue Jeans Memory (July 11, 1981)
- Good Luck Love (December 20, 1981)
- Highteen Boogie (August 7, 1982)
- The Mysterious Gemini • Y&S (December 11, 1982)
- Heart Beat (August 4, 1983)

=== Television ===
- Kinpachi-sensei (1979–80), Masaharu Sawamura
- Kyoshi Binbin Monogatari (1988), Ryunosuke Tokugawa

Preceded by Tomoko Kuwae	Japan Record Award for Best New Artist; 1980	Succeeded by Masahiko Kondō
