= Kusoge =

Bad video game in Japanese gaming culture

In Japanese video gaming, a kusoge (クソゲー, kusogē; pronounced [kɯ̥soɡeː]), lit. 'shitty game', is an unenjoyable or poorly made video game. Though the label is usually applied disparagingly, there is a subculture of celebrating kusoge.

== Etymology ==
The term kusogē is a portmanteau of kuso (クソ or 糞; lit. 'crap') and gēmu (ゲーム; 'game'; a loanword from English). Though it is commonly attributed to illustrator Jun Miura, and occasionally to Takahashi-Meijin of Hudson Soft, it is unclear when and by whom it was popularized – or whether a single source can be attributed in the first place. By the language used in videogame magazines of the time, it appears that the word was nascent in 1986 and a common expression by 1987. In 1985 and 1986, a variety of other, less codified terms were sometimes synthesized at the author's discretion, usually combining a pejorative with the word "game" or "soft" (a wasei-eigo abbreviation of "software") – examples include dame-soft (ダメソフト; lit. 'no-good software'), suka-soft (スカ・ソフト; lit. 'dud software') and kasu-gēmu (カスゲーム; lit. 'dreg game').

A variety of similarly constructed terms exist to describe other subjective attributes – for example, kamigē (神ゲー; lit. 'god game'; used as 'amazing game'), bakagē (バカゲー; 'stupid game'), and kigē (奇ゲー; 'uncanny game'). The same manner of portmanteau is also used for something more akin to genres, such as kakugē (格ゲー; 'fighting game') and eroge (エロゲー; 'erotic game').

== Culture ==
"Kusoge" is in essence a disparaging term, and is typically used to recommend against a video game. Nonetheless, a subculture that celebrates kusoge and seeks them out has established itself. This is similar to paracinema or camp appreciation of works of art: often but not always ironic; reveling in what is incoherent, odd, absurd, flawed, or broken. This counter-cultural appreciation of kusoge can at the very least be traced back to the Bishoku Club Bakagē Senka (美食倶楽部バカゲー専科; lit. 'Gourmet Club Stupid Games Course'), a regular column in the video game magazine Used Games (later known as GAMESIDE), which started publication in 1996. In the fighting game community, kusoge typically refers to fighting games that are severely unbalanced for competitive play through design mistakes or bugs, which can lead to ridiculous strategies, and thus these games are considered funny and not just bad. Fist of the North Star for the PlayStation 2 is seen as a prime example of a fighting game kusoge, notorious for its long, infinite combos.

In later years, the word "kusoge" has occasionally been embraced by video game companies. Taito described Takeshi no Chōsenjō as "that legendary kusoge" (Note: あの伝説のクソゲー, ano densetsu no kusogē) in marketing for the game's 2017 smartphone re-release. Sunsoft similarly used the word in the marketing for the 2023 video game Ikki Unite – a sequel to noted kusoge Ikki – stating in a press release that "It only makes us happy to still today hear people say that 'Sunsoft were the original kusoge makers'." (Note: 今でも元祖クソゲーといえば「SUNSOFT」とお声がけいただき大変うれしい限りです。, Ima de mo ganso kusogē to ieba Sunsoft to okoe ga itadaki taihen ureshii kagiri desu.)

== See also ==
- List of video games notable for negative reception
- Shovelware
