= Guinea Pig: Devil's Experiment =

1985 Japanese film

Guinea Pig: Devils Experiment.
- VHS cover

Japanese name
- Kanji: ギニーピッグ 悪魔の実験
Transcriptions
- Revised Hepburn: Ginī Piggu: Akuma no Jikken
- Directed by: Satoru Ogura
- Written by: Satoru Ogura
- Release date: 1985
- Running time: 43 minutes
- Country: Japan
- Language: Japanese

Guinea Pig: Devil's Experiment (Japanese: ギニーピッグ 悪魔の実験, Hepburn: Ginī Piggu: Akuma no Jikken) is a 1985 Japanese exploitation horror film written and directed by Satoru Ogura, and the first film in the Guinea Pig film series.

The film depicts a group of three men who graphically abuse a woman in a number of ways. It is presented in a found-footage style, with on-screen text claiming that the film features real footage of torture—supposedly intended as an experiment on the human body's tolerance to pain—that was purportedly sent to Ogura. However, the scenes of violence featured in the film are not authentic, extensively utilising practical effects.

Guinea Pig: Devil's Experiment has been called a "faux snuff film", and has been noted for its depiction of violence.

== Synopsis ==
The film is presented under the guise of being a video sent to director Satoru Ogura, with opening text claiming the following:

Several years ago, I obtained a private video under the title Guinea Pig. Its commentary said that 'this is a report of an experiment on the breaking point of bearable pain and the corrosion of people's senses'... but it was, in fact, an exhibition of devilish cruelty as three perpetrators severely abused a woman. Note: 'Guinea Pig' is defined as any experimental material.

A woman is seen hanging motionless outdoors in a net. Throughout the film, she is tortured by three men in a variety of ways. The film is divided into ten segments, each depicting a different method of torture. The first segment, titled "hit" (殴), shows the men taking turns striking the woman in her face numerous times. The next segment, "kick" (蹴), depicts the woman, blindfolded with her hands behind her back, being repeatedly kicked and berated by the three men. In the third segment, "claw" (抓), the woman's right hand and forearm are pinched with pliers. The fourth segment, "spin" (回), shows the men spinning the woman in a chair over 100 times. The fifth segment, "sound" (音), depicts the woman being forced to endure hours of sound torture, wherein headphones playing loud white noise are secured to her head.

In the sixth segment, "skin" (剥), one of the woman's fingernails is ripped off, and she is shown hanging outside in a net once again. The seventh segment, "burn" (焼), depicts the woman laid out on a table, and scalding oil of varying degrees is poured on her skin, burning her. The eighth segment, "worm" (虫), shows maggots being dumped on her. In the ninth segment, "guts" (臓), the men throw organs and entrails on the woman. An incision is made along the back of one of her hands with a blade, and the hand is then smashed with a hammer. In the tenth and final segment, "needle" (針), the men insert a needle into the woman's temple, poking it through her left eye. She is then shown hanging outdoors in the net once again, unmoving.

The film ends with text reading:

The details of this experiment were missing when I received this video but the name, age and other information of the woman and the three men in this video are under investigation.

== Critical reception and analysis ==
In 1984, Satoru Ogura set out to portray a series of highly grotesque films. The first draft of Devil's Experiment was passed to manga artist and writer Hideshi Hino and was met with positive feedback. Hino began simultaneously working on the script for the second installment. Thinking that it would be highly difficult to find actors for this series, Ogura ran advertisements requesting volunteers. Much to his surprise, he received a plethora of responses. Both Devil's Experiment and Flower of Flesh and Blood were shot consecutively in 1985 and was released publicly in 1986. Upon release, Devil's Experiment impacted the Japanese rental market. Family friendly shops that were opposed of the idea of carrying the title later gave in to keep up with the number of requests from their customer base.

Writing about the presentation of Devil's Experiment as being a genuine snuff film, J. Doyle Wallis of DVD Talk wrote that "it didn't strike me as the slightest bit true", but noted that, "despite spotting the stumbles that betray its reality, it is quite disturbing". He called it "a faux snuff film", "hard to watch", and "bold but also utterly deplorable", and stated that the film's content unreasonably takes advantage of "a part of the human psyche".

In his book Eros in Hell: Sex, Blood and Madness in Japanese Cinema, Jack Hunter wrote that the filming and editing techniques implemented in the film lend to it being "an effective and surprisingly low-key meditation on the cumulative dehumanization that violence causes in both aggressor and victim alike." In Nightmare Japan: Contemporary Japanese Horror Cinema, author Jay McRoy similarly notes such techniques, writing that while the film "[blurs] audience distinctions between fact and fiction, thus heightening the visceral impact generated by the 'experiment's' verisimilitude", its "technical sophistication and artistry" exposes its fictional nature.

== Home media ==
Guinea Pig: Devil's Experiment was released on VHS by Midnight 25 Video. In the early 2000s, distributor Unearthed Films released the film on DVD as a double feature with another entry in the Guinea Pig series, Android of Notre Dame.

== See also ==
- Guinea Pig 2: Flower of Flesh and Blood
