= Panorama of Hell =

Japanese manga one-shot

地獄変 (Jigokuhen)
- Genre: Horror
- Manga
- Written by: Hideshi Hino
- Published by: Hibari shobō
- English publisher: NA: Blast Books (former); Star Fruit Books (current)
- Published: 1984
- Volumes: 1

Panorama of Hell (Japanese: 地獄変, Hepburn: Jigokuhen) is a 1984 one shot Japanese horror manga by Hideshi Hino. It was published in the United States by Blast Books and in France as Panorama de l'enfer by Éditions IMHO in 2004. Star Fruit Books published the manga in English in 2023.

== Synopsis ==
A painter who was conceived at the moment of the atomic bombing of Hiroshima is driven to create a grand panorama of hellish suffering, using his own blood as paint. He introduces the reader to his unconventional family, and tells stories about his abusive parents, who escaped from Manchuria after World War II, and his violent childhood. Eventually, his plan to paint a final masterpiece, a full-scale "Hell on Earth" unfolds.

== Analysis ==
Scholar Rajyashree Pandey analyzes that in the narrative, the titular "hell" is not a metaphysical elsewhere but is manifested in the corrupted, post-nuclear contemporary world. She notes that the climactic nuclear apocalypse painted by the protagonist is not presented as a tragic end but as an "exhilarating" moment of total annihilation. This perspective inverts a Western horror framework, such as Julia Kristeva's concept of the "abject." Rather than viewing bodily disintegration and death with horror as a loss of self, Panorama of Hell presents it as a potential release from a world that already is hell. This aligns with the Buddhist doctrinal view of the body as impermanent (mujō) and foul, a pedagogical tool to overcome attachment.

== Reception ==
It was nominated for Best Album at the 2005 Angoulême International Comics Festival.
