= Ricky (musician) =

- Born: October 20
- Origin: Saitama Prefecture, Japan
- Genres: Rock
- Years active: 1995–
- Labels: Avex Trax, Marsa, Universal Music Japan, PCI Music
- Website: www.marsa.ne.jp/ricky/

Ricky (born October 20, year unknown) is a Japanese musician originally from Saitama Prefecture. He is known as the vocalist of bands Dasein and R*A*P, and became the full-time vocalist of Rider Chips in 2005.

Ricky, who claims to have the full name Ricky Astrovich Primakov, also claims that he is an extraterrestrial, specifically one from the planet Iscandar, a planet from the Space Battleship Yamato metaseries. In 2009, he began a solo project with the release of "Yugaidoku Song" (唯我独SONG), and later in 2009 he released the album R☆POP. In 2010, Dasein, which went on hiatus in 2003, released a new single to announce a new tour that Ricky became a part of after his tour ended.

== Discography ==
=== Albums ===
- R☆POP - November 18, 2009 - Marsa/Universal
- R☆MUSTER - December 15, 2010 - Marsa/PCI

=== Singles ===
- "Yugaidoku Song" (唯我独SONG) - April 1, 2009
- "Wagamama Emotion" (我儘EMOTION) - July 22, 2009
