= Kinpachi-sensei =

Japanese television drama

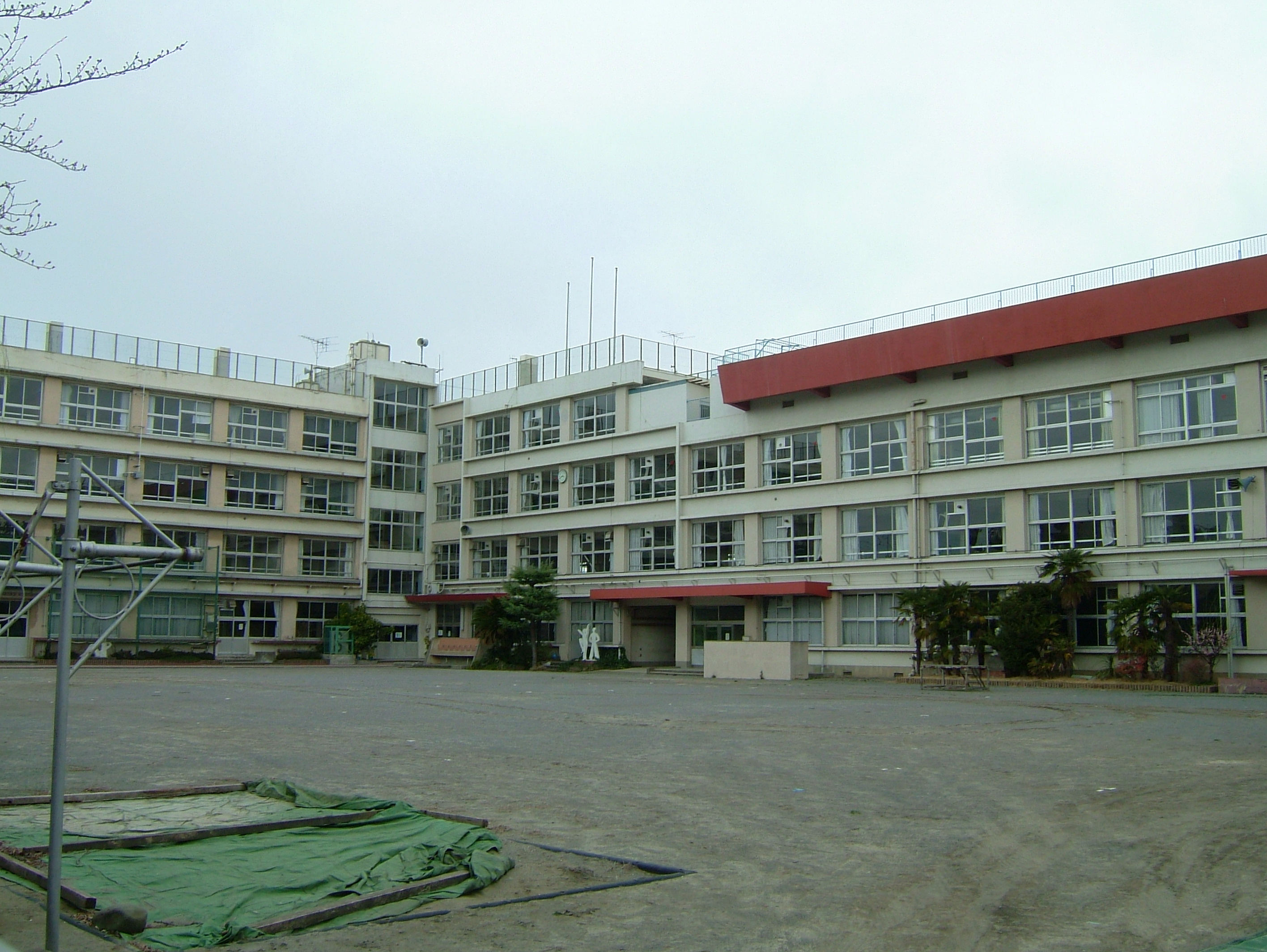
- The school featured in the series.
- Also known as: Mr. Kinpachi in Class 3B
- 3年B組金八先生
- Genre: Drama
- Created by: Mieko Osanai
- Starring: Tetsuya Takeda
- Composers: Missa Johnouchi; Ichizo Seo
- Country of origin: Japan
- Original language: Japanese
- No. of seasons: 8

Production
- Producer: Mitsuru Yanai

Original release
- Network: TBS
- Release: October 26, 1979 – March 27, 2011

Kinpachi-sensei (3年B組金八先生, San-nen B-gumi Kinpachi-sensei) is a Japanese television drama that aired from 1979 to 2011. The official English title is Mr. Kinpachi in Class 3B. Kinpachi-sensei tells the story of a third-year junior high school class in Japan; its teacher is Kinpachi Sakamoto, played by Tetsuya Takeda. The series has a lot of social commentary on issues such as homosexuality, gender dysphoria, and psychological pregnancy, as well as bullying (of both students and teachers), teenage pregnancy, teenage suicide, hikikomori, and the extreme pressure to do well in school.

The series began in 1979, a pivotal year when issues such as delinquency and on campus violence reached a fever-pitch amongst the educational spectrum; "Kinpachi-sensei", portrayed by former singer Tetsuya Takeda of Kaientai fame, attempts to resolve such problems using a blend of charisma, honesty, humor and wit.

== Seasons ==
Over the span of 32 years, it has spawned 8 seasons. In 2001, the series helped to rocket Aya Ueto to greater national attention. In 2011, Keito Okamoto of Hey! Say! JUMP appeared in the drama's final episode as a student delinquent.

== Season overview ==
=== Season 1 (1979-80) ===
Cast

- Kaoru Sugita as Yukino Asai
- Shingo Tsurumi
- Junko Mihara
- Toshihiko Tahara
- Satomi Kobayashi
- Masahiko Kondō

=== Season 2 (1980-81) ===
Cast

- Kiichi Naoe as Masaru Kato
- Hiroyuki Okita
- Maiko Kawakami
- Yūsuke Kawazu as Teacher Kamibayashi

=== Season 3 (1988) ===
Cast

- Akiko Ura as Yuko Yamada
- Miyabi Kishi as Kimie Mizuno
- Masato Hagiwara
- Katsuyuki Mori
- Tadanobu Asano

=== Season 4 (1995-96) ===
Cast

- Rena Komine as Mika Hiroshima
- Mitsunari Hashimoto

=== Season 5 (1999-2000) ===
Cast

- Shunsuke Kazama as Kenjiro Kanesue
- Ayumi Oka as Chiharu Yasui
- Kazuya Kamenashi

=== Season 6 (2001-02) ===
Cast

- Aya Ueto as Nao Tsurumoto
- Yoshikazu Tōshin
- Yuika Motokariya
- Airi Taira

=== Season 7 (2004-05) ===
Cast

- Hikaru Yaotome as Shu Maruyama
- Sayuri Iwata
- Gaku Hamada
- Tomoka Kurokawa
- Miku Ishida

=== Season 8 (2007-08) ===
Cast

- Mayū Kusakari
- Taku Kamei

=== The Final (2011) ===
Cast

- Keito Okamoto

== In popular culture ==
- The cry of "Year three, Class B? Kinpachi-sensei!", or something similar, depending on the series it happens in, is a popular shout-out in shows on Japanese television.
  - As an example, in the TV anime Lucky Star, each episode is introduced by the four main protagonists warning that they are going to start the episode. After mid-series, they are promoted to the third year in their high school. The initial introduction is changed to reflect this. Since Japanese students are assigned each year to a class by teachers, and they could suddenly go to a different class being separated from previous classmates (thing which happens in Lucky Star), the main protagonists are surprised by their new class and yell at their referring teacher: "Oh, san nen B-gumi? Kuroi-sensei!"
- In the TV anime Gintama, there is a segment which sometimes appears after the ending theme where Sakata Gintoki, the series' main protagonist, portrays a teacher called "Ginpachi-sensei", teaching class 3-Z. The segment comes from a novel by the same name, that later got a separate manga and anime adaptation.
- There's a similar segment in the TV anime Yo-kai Watch where the series' mascot, Jibanyan, is portrayed as "Nyanpachi-sensei", teaching class 3-Y.
- Author Koushun Takami's Battle Royale contains a character named Kinpatsu Sakamochi, a satirical reference to Kinpachi. In Takami's text, Sakamochi is a sadistic individual who seems to gleefully delight in the exploits of the 42 students forced to kill each other in "The Program". Some critics see Sakamochi's sadism as a sardonic attack on the idealized Kinpachi. The manga version of Battle Royale has an evil teacher named Yonemi Kamon, while the film has Kitano.
- In the live-action version of the manga Great Teacher Onizuka (GTO), Onizuka makes a few mentions of Kinpachi-sensei, implying that he is a fan of the series, since his complete collection gets stolen in one of the beginning episodes.
- During the 2012 annual end of year Batsu game special of the popular Japanese humor show Downtown no Gaki no Tsukai ya Arahende!!, "No laughing, Enthusiastic teachers", the whole cast was dressed as Kinpachi-sensei, wearing matching clothes and long wigs, apart from Hamada Masatoshi who got a short wig instead.
- And in the 2014 end of year Downtown no Gaki no Tsukai ya Arahende!! Batsu game special "No laughing, Prison escape", a parody of "Kinpachi-sensei" as "Furiwake-Sensei" was done with former Sumo wrestler Takamisakari in the lead role, chosen because of his name. Sakamoto also sang the theme song, badly, probably never having rehearsed it beforehand. Also appearing in that parody was Naoe Kiichi who reprised his role as Kato Masaru.
- In Chapter 23.5 of Shūmatsu no Valkyrie, a character named Sakamoto Inpachi appears as a contestant in a game of Mahjong teaming with the first man, Adam, against the gods Zeus and Ares in a match meant to determine the fate of humanity.
- In season 1, episode 15 of the 2019 anime adaptation of Fruits Basket, the recurring character Ayame references Kinpachi Sensei by saying "As Kinpachi-sensei once said, people are made to support one another."
- In the chapter 4, page 9 of the manga Nanba MG5, the character Shimazaki makes a reference to Kinpachi-sensei.
