= Hideshi Hino =

Japanese manga artist (born 1946)

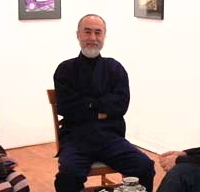
- Hino in 2006
- Born: Hoshino Yasushi; April 19, 1946 (age 80); Qiqihar, China
- Known for: Horror manga
- Notable work: Hell Baby; Hino Horrors; Panorama of Hell; Guinea Pig 2: Flower of Flesh and Blood; Guinea Pig: Mermaid in a Manhole
- Website: hinohideshi.com

Hideshi Hino (Japanese: 日野日出志, Hepburn: Hino Hideshi; born April 19, 1946) is a Japanese manga artist who specializes in horror stories. His comics include Hell Baby, Hino Horrors, and Panorama of Hell. He also wrote and directed two entries in the Guinea Pig series of horror films: Flower of Flesh and Blood (1985), and Mermaid in a Manhole (1988).

== Life and career ==
Hideshi Hino was born Hoshino Yasushi (星野安司) in Qiqihar, China, to Japanese immigrant workers in Japanese-occupied Northeast China just when Japan surrendered at the end of World War II to the invading Soviet forces. His family escaped to Japan fearing retribution from Chinese civilians, so his town gathered up everybody and started to make their move to the remaining internationally governed harbours.

Hino has claimed that he was nearly killed en route to Japan by his fellow townspeople during the evacuation from China. Some of his manga have been based on his life and its events; for example, his grandfather was a yakuza and his father used to be a pig farmer with a spider tattoo on his back. Hino has depicted these in his manga many times (as in Panorama of Hell).

Although originally considering a job in the film industry, the works of manga artists Shigeru Sugiura and Yoshiharu Tsuge inspired the young Hino to express himself in the medium of manga instead. He originally began in doujinshi, and his first professional work, the short story Tsumetai Ase, was published in Osamu Tezuka's experimental manga magazine COM in 1967. From 1968 on, he published in the alternative manga magazine Garo. With the serialized "Hideshi Hino's Shocking Theater" coming out in 1971, his bizarre world of deviant killers, grotesque beasts, and decaying corpses was firmly established.

He found a large following in the world of shojo manga. Works such as Dead Little Girl and Ghost School were prominently featured in shojo magazines.

In 2004, Pony Canyon made a series of six live action films, based on his manga, called Hideshi Hino's Theater of Horror.

One of Hino's hobbies is maintaining Japanese swords. He is also a practitioner of Budō.

== Style and themes ==
A central theme in Hino's work is the fluidity and interpenetration between humans and animals, and between different states of being. Scholar Rajyashree Pandey notes that unlike in many Western horror narratives where the monstrous "other" is excised, Hino's stories often incorporate the monstrous. In Hatsuka nezumi (White Mouse), the monstrous mouse is ultimately recuperated into the family, blurring the lines between pet, monster, and child. Pandey suggests this fluidity "owes much to a Buddhist understanding of the world," specifically the concept of the rokudō (six realms), where beings are in a constant cycle of rebirth and transformation across realms, preventing any entity from being seen as purely "other."

This Buddhist framework also informs the depiction of death and bodily disintegration in Hino's manga. In Hino's work, such as Panorama of Hell, graphic bodily horror is not solely a source of anxiety but can become "the means for the attainment of enlightenment and liberation," or a form of release from a corrupted world.

Hino's narratives frequently lack definitive endings and challenge the primacy of the human self. As Pandey observes, in Hatsuka nezumi, the final panels return to the beginning, casting doubt on the story's reality. In Hell Baby, the monstrous child finds solace in a death that resembles a return to the womb. These "open-endedness of narratives which resist neat closure" and the "indeterminacy of the self" are, according to Pandey, features of a worldview informed by Buddhist sensibility and are also emblematic of postmodern culture.

Hino utilizes traditional artistic elements from Japanese emaki (picture scrolls) and a grotesque aesthetic with deep roots in Japanese art history to explore these themes.

== Works ==
- Tsumetai Ase (つめたい汗), 1967, published in COM
- Sabu no Machi (恐怖! 四次元の町 - サブの町), 1977–1978, published in Weekly Shōnen Magazine
- Hell Baby (恐怖・地獄少女, Kyofu Jigoku Shōjo), 1982
- The Hino Horror series:
  - Hino Horror Volume 1: The Red Snake (赤い蛇 Akai Hebi) (1983, one shot). Published in France as Serpent Rouge by Éditions IMHO .
  - Hino Horror Volume 2: The Bug Boy (毒虫小僧 Dokumushi Kozō) (1975, one shot). Published in France as L'Enfant Insecte by Éditions IMHO in November 2010.
  - Hino Horror Volume 3-4: Oninbo and the Bugs from Hell (地獄虫を食う! 鬼んぼ Jigoku Mushi Woku! Oninbo) (2 vol.). (1987)
  - Hino Horror Volume 5: The Living Corpse (死肉の男 Shiniku no Otoko) (1986, one shot).
  - Hino Horror Volume 6: Black Cat (黒猫の眼が闇に Kuro Neko no Megayamini)
  - Hino Horror Volume 7-8: The Collection (Mコレクション M Collection) (1995-1996, 2 vol., published in Horror M
  - Hino Horror Volume 9: Ghost School (published in Suspiria)
  - Hino Horror Volume 10: Death's Reflection (published in Suspiria)
  - Hino Horror Volume 11: Gallery of Horrors (恐怖ギャラリー Kyōfu Gallery) (1996, 1 vol., published in Kyōfu no Yakata DX).
  - Hino Horror Volume 12: Mystique Mandala of Hell (怪奇!地獄まんだら Kaiki! Jigoku Mandara) (1982, one shot).
  - Hino Horror Volume 13: Zipangu Night (ジパングナイト) (1997, 1 vol., published in Kyōfu no Yakata DX).
  - Hino Horror Volume 14: Skin And Bone (published in Suspiria)
  - Hino Horror Volume 15: The Experiment
  - Hino Horror Volume 16: Who's That Girl? (published in Suspiria)
- Comics Underground Japan (short story Laughing Ball)
- The Art of Hideshi Hino. The manga segments were serialized in Suspense & Horror.
- Genshoku no kotō. Bokura no sensei (幻色の孤島（ぼくらの先生）) (1972, one shot). Published in Spain as La isla de las pesadillas.
- Zōroku no Kibyō (蔵六の奇病) (1976, one shot). Published in Spain as La enfermedad de Zoroku.
- Lullabies from Hell (地獄の子守唄) (1977, one shot).
- City of Pigs (ブタの町, Buta no Machi) (1983)
- Panorama of Hell (地獄変, Jigokuhen) (1984, one shot). Published in France as Panorama de l'enfer by Éditions IMHO . Published in Italy as Visioni d'Inferno by Telemaco Comics.
- Circus Kitan (サーカス奇譚) (1991, 1 vol). Published in Spain as Circo de monstruos.
- Masterpiece of the bizarre (怪奇傑作選 Kaiki kessakusen) (2015, one shot). Published in Spain as Historias de la máscara by Ediciones La Cúpula, S.L.

== Filmography ==
Year	Title	Director	Writer	Notes	Ref(s)
1985	Guinea Pig 2: Flower of Flesh and Blood	Yes	Yes		
1988	Guinea Pig 6: Mermaid in a Manhole	Yes	Yes		
2004	Dead Girl Walking		Yes	Original comic	
2004	The Ravaged House: Zoroku's Disease		Yes	Original comic	
2004	The Boy from Hell		Yes	Original comic	
2004	Death Train		Yes	Original comic	
2004	Occult Detective Club: The Doll Cemetery		Yes	Original comic	
2014	Bara no Meikyu	Yes	Yes		
2026	The Living Corpse		Yes	Entirely AI generated	
