= Yoshio Nomura =

Japanese musician

Yoshio Nomura (野村 義男, Nomura Yoshio; born October 26, 1964) is a Japanese guitarist, music producer, narrator, former idol and actor. In the 80's, he was part of the idol group Tanokin Trio. He released a single called "kimagure ONE-WAY BOY" in 1983 as lead vocalist and guitarist of THE GOOD-BYE.

== Major casting works ==
=== Television ===
- Kinpachi-sensei (TBS)
  - The first series (26 October 1979 – 28 March 1980)
  - Special 1 (October 8, 1982)
  - Special 3 (October 5, 1984)
  - Special 5 (1986)
  - Special 6 (1987)
  - Special 9 (1998)
- Tadaima Hokago (ただいま放課後) (May 26 – September 19, 1980, Fuji TV)
- お化けのサンバ (1980, TV Tokyo)
- 幕末花の美剣士たち (January 4, 1981, TV Tokyo)
- サザエさん (1981–1982, Fuji TV)
- 大河ドラマ「峠の群像」 (1982, NHK)
- ボクの音楽武者修行 (1982, TV Asahi)
- 少年刑務所-母と子の遠い道程 (1982, ytv)
- セーラー服通り (1986, TBS)
- 銀河テレビ小説「はねっかえり純情派」 (1987, NHK)
- ハロー!グッバイ 第13話「女が刑事になる時」 (1989, NTV)
- 世にも奇妙な物語「廃校七番目の不思議」 (February 14, 1991)

=== Film ===
- Third-Year High School Boys (December 18, 1982)
- Toshi in Takarazuka: Love Forever (August 4, 1983)
- Kamen Rider Agito: Project G4 (2001) (Voice appearance (as a member of RIDER CHIPS))
- Kamen Rider Blade: Missing Ace (2004) (Male role playing in Hakaranda (as a member of RIDER CHIPS))

==== Tanokin Super Hit Series ====
- Graffiti Youth: Sneaker Blues (February 11, 1981)
- Blue Jeans Memory (July 11, 1981)
- Good Luck Love (Guddo rakku love) (December 20, 1981)
- Highteen Boogie (August 7, 1982)
- The Mysterious Gemini • Y&S (December 11, 1982)
- Heart Beat (August 4, 1983)
