= Hiroomote =

Hiroomote 広面
- Neighborhood of Akita City
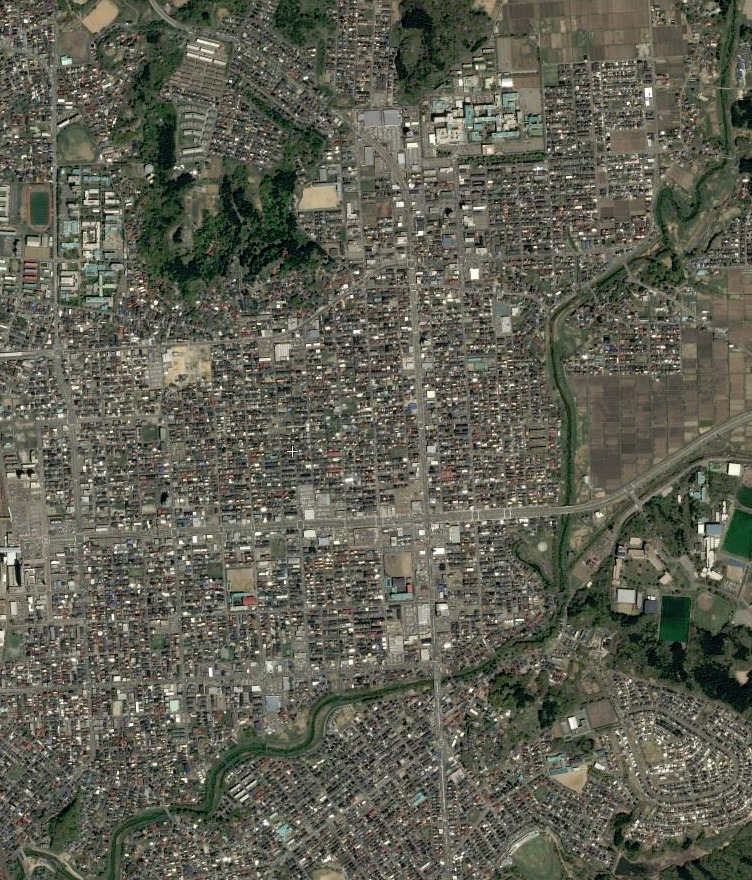
- Hiroomote on 5 May 2019
- Etymology: Shiroomote (城面)
- Interactive map of Hiroomote 広面
- Country: Japan
- Prefecture: Akita Prefecture
- City: Akita

Population (1 October 2016)
  - Total: 14,095
- Time zone: UTC+9 (Japan Standard Time)
- Yubin Bango: 010-0041
- Area code: 018
- Vehicle registration: Akita

Hiroomote (広面, Hiroomote) is a neighbourhood located in Akita City, Akita Prefecture, Japan. Annexed by the city in 1941, it borders the neighborhoods of Shimokitate on the east, Yanagida on the north, Tegata on the west and Sakura and Yokomori on the south that is bounded by Taihei River. Developed primarily in the post-World War II era, it is residential with commercial uses fronting prefectural roads #41, #28 and #62. The neighborhood is the location of the Akita University Hospital and Hiroomote Shopping Center.

== Households and population ==
Year	Households	Population
1592		
1730	70	
1815	99	
1887	467	2,659
2016	7,160	14,095

As of 1 October 2016, there were 14,095 people residing in this neighborhood, which contained 7,160 housing units.

Aza	Households	Population
Akanuma	111	210
Ienoshita	454	728
Ikari	185	422
Itabashizoe	255	498
Obukuro	45	101
Omaki	267	569
Kito	137	226
Kanisawa	17	41
Kawasaki	398	722
Konumafurukawabata	142	336
Kondosekikoshi	151	344
Kondosekizoe	111	212
Suiko	71	109
Takada	138	304
Tsutsumishiki	83	159
Tsurubemachi	432	829
Doteshita	293	485
Toyonoue	111	236
Toyonooki	354	633
Toyoguchi	382	938
Toyonoshita	159	303
Naganuma	88	188
Nabenuma	158	391
Nikaidutsumi	127	279
Nukazuka	371	658
Nozoe	312	616
Hasunuma	315	558
HIrune	212	333
Hiroomote	225	492
Futatsuya	126	252
Miyata	32	109
Yachioki	79	151
Yachida	328	624
Yanaisado	320	722
Yashikida	171	317
total	7,160	14,095

== Schools ==
=== Hiroomote Elementary School ===
Hiroomote Elementary School 秋田市立広面小学校

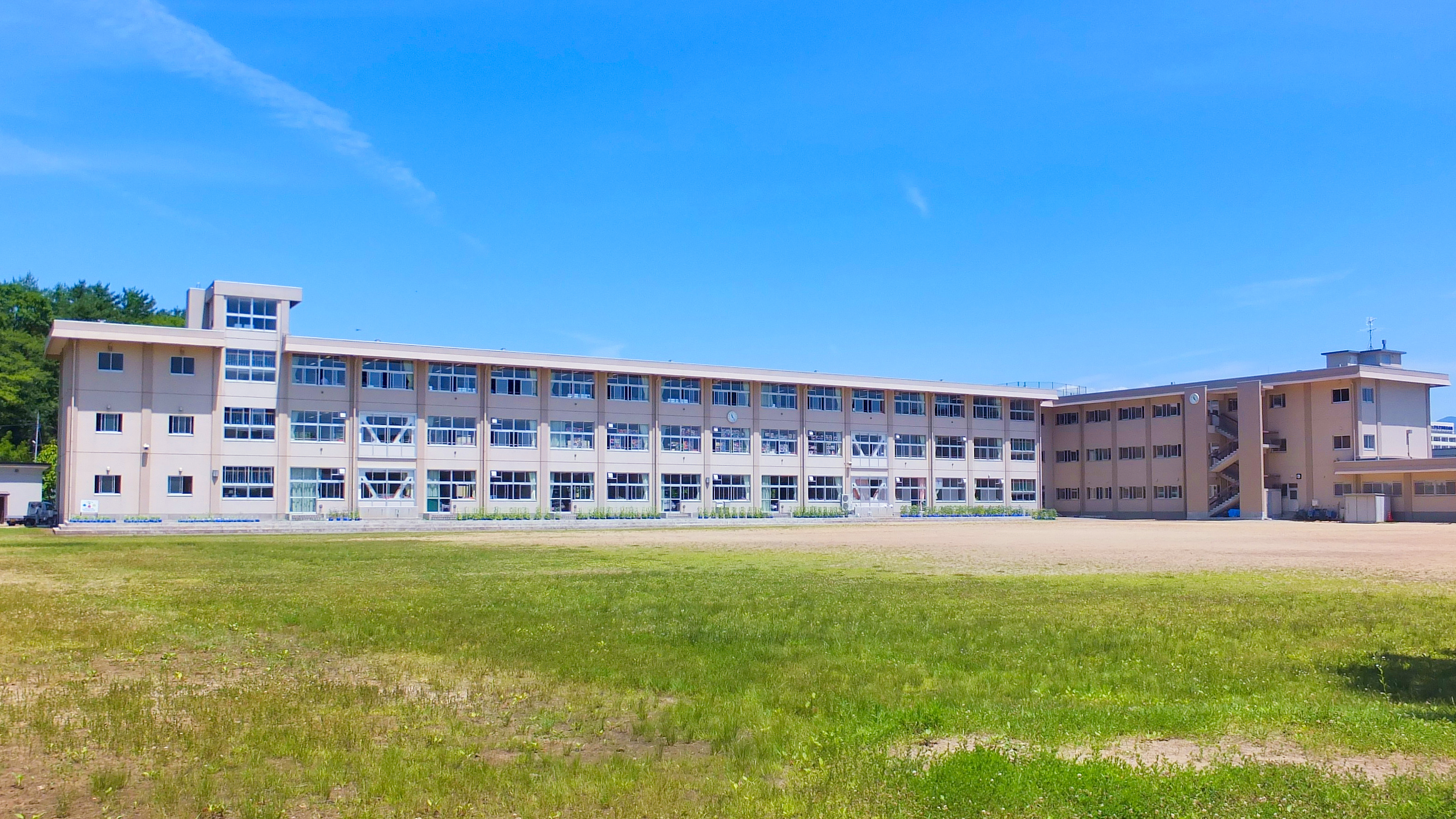
- The school in July 2016

Location
- Kanisawa 29, Hiroomote, Akitashi, Akitaken; 0100041; Japan; 39°43′44″N 140°08′41″E

Information
- Former name: Hiroomote Jinjo Elementary School 廣面尋常小學校; Hiroomote Kan-i Elementary School 廣面簡易小學校; Narayama Kan-i Elementary School 楢山簡易小學校; Hiroomote Jinjo Koto Elementary School 廣面尋常高等小學校; Akita City Kokumin School 秋田市立廣面國民學校
- Type: Elementary school
- Motto: 緑と太陽の広小 (School of greenery and sunshine)
- Religious affiliation: none
- Established: 3 November 1874
- School board: City of Akita Board of Education
- Principal: Tomoko Owada
- Headmaster: Hiroshi Kikuchi
- Staff: 42
- Grades: 1st grade-6th grade
- Gender: Mixed
- Age range: 6-12
- Enrollment: 550 (2019)
- Classes: 21
- Education system: Japanese curriculum
- Language: Japanese
- Campus size: 21,516 sqm
- Campus type: Urban
- Mascot: Green Boy and Sun Girl
- Nickname: Hirosho
- Rival: Higashi Elementary School
- Newspaper: Koho Hiroomote
- Feeder schools: Akita City Joto Junior High School (1979-present); Akita Higashi Junior High School (1953-1979); Tegata Junior High School(-1953); Kubota Junior High School(-1953)
- Website: Official website

Hiroomote Elementary School 秋田市立広面小学校 (Akitashi Public Elementary School, Akitashiritsu Hiroomote shōgakkō) is a coeducational primary school located in Hiroomote, Akita City in Akita Prefecture, Japan, teaching children of aged 6 to 12 years. The school starts in April and ends in March, and the nickname is Hirosho. It was founded in 1874, and the school had its 140th anniversary celebration in 2015. The neighbouring places include an area of native forest named "Woods of Green Boy" as a part of Tegatayama. It is governed by the City of Akita Board of Education, and the staff is composed of a principal, an associate principal, classroom teachers and an administration team of staff, totally 42 persons. The principal from 2018 to 2020 was Kazuki Hoshino. The current principal is Tomoko Owada.

==== History ====
The school was formed in a private house of Yanaisado, Hiroomote Village, Minamiakita District, Akita, on 3 November 1874 (Meiji 7). The former school building was located in Tsurubemachi, a current E-pal site. The school moved to its current location in 1977 and a new swimming pool was opened in 1980. The Hiroomote baseball club won prefectural titles several times under the reign of manager Tatsuro Tsuruta(鶴田達郎) in late 70's and 80's. The team was also coached by former Nipponham Fighters pitcher, Mikio Kudo. They have got 2-time prefectural gold medal at NHK School Choir Competition in 2007 and 2011, and 2-time prefectural champion of "30 persons 31 legs" race in 2000 and 2001. They also have in-hospital classrooms called "Himawari class (elementary school students)" at Akita University Hospital. Hiroomote Jidokan (広面児童館, children's center) is attached and it occasionally turned out to be a polling station placing ballot boxes.

==== Students, logo, uniform and school lunches ====
As of 2019, the school has a roll of 550 students. The Hiroomote ES logo consists of "hiro" letter in kanji and three unhulled rice, which represents Virtue, Wisdom and Body. It does not have a compulsory uniform that must be worn daily except for gym clothes. Kyushoku (School meals) are prepared in the school kitchen, and provided in Hiroomote ES.

==== Curriculum ====
===== Core subjects include =====
- Japanese
- Arithmetic
- Science
- Social studies
- Music
- Crafts
- Physical education
- Home economics
- English

==== Sports day ====
They have a "Hirosho Dai Undokai", Sports Day event in May, and the school is divided into red, white and blue teams, which compete in footraces, obstacle races, tamaire (a kind of basketball), and relay races. All grades participate in the half-day festivities, families join in to watch, to set up the tents, to cheer their children.

==== School shows and productions ====
Hiroomote ES host a school play entitled "Gakushu Happyokai" every year at Hirosho Arena. This performing arts show had been called "Gakugeikai".

==== School trips and camps ====
11-year-old students usually have a stay & camp at Mantarame(39°47′54.4″N 140°13′31.1″E) of Taiheizan Resort Park located in the skirt of Mt. Taihei. This lodging training had been done at Omoriyama Boys' House(39°40′15.7″N 140°04′21.3″E) until 2002. 12-year-old pupils have their largest school trip to Sendai area.

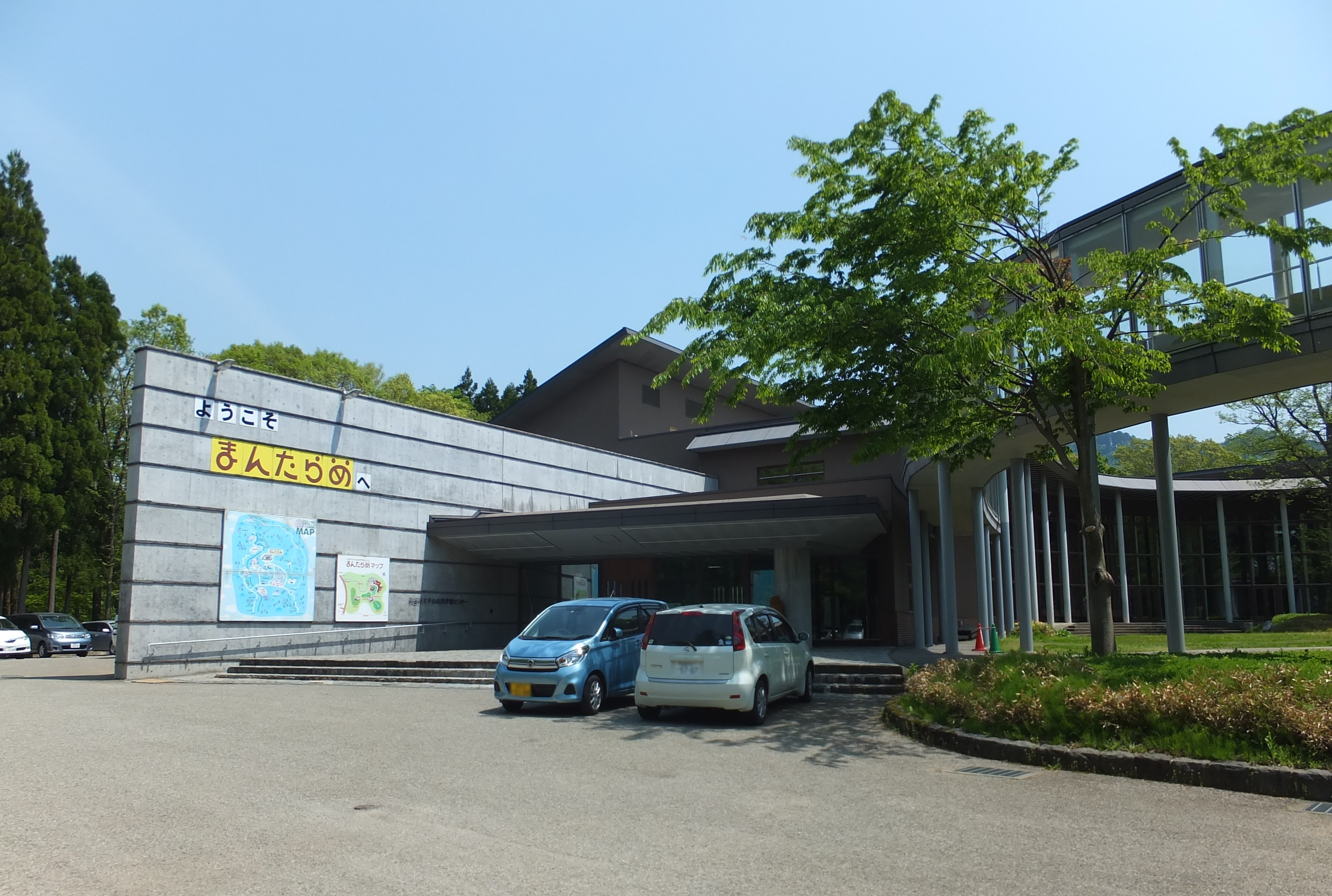
Mantarame

==== No janitors ====
Japanese primary schools do not employ janitors, and student have to clean it up themselves.

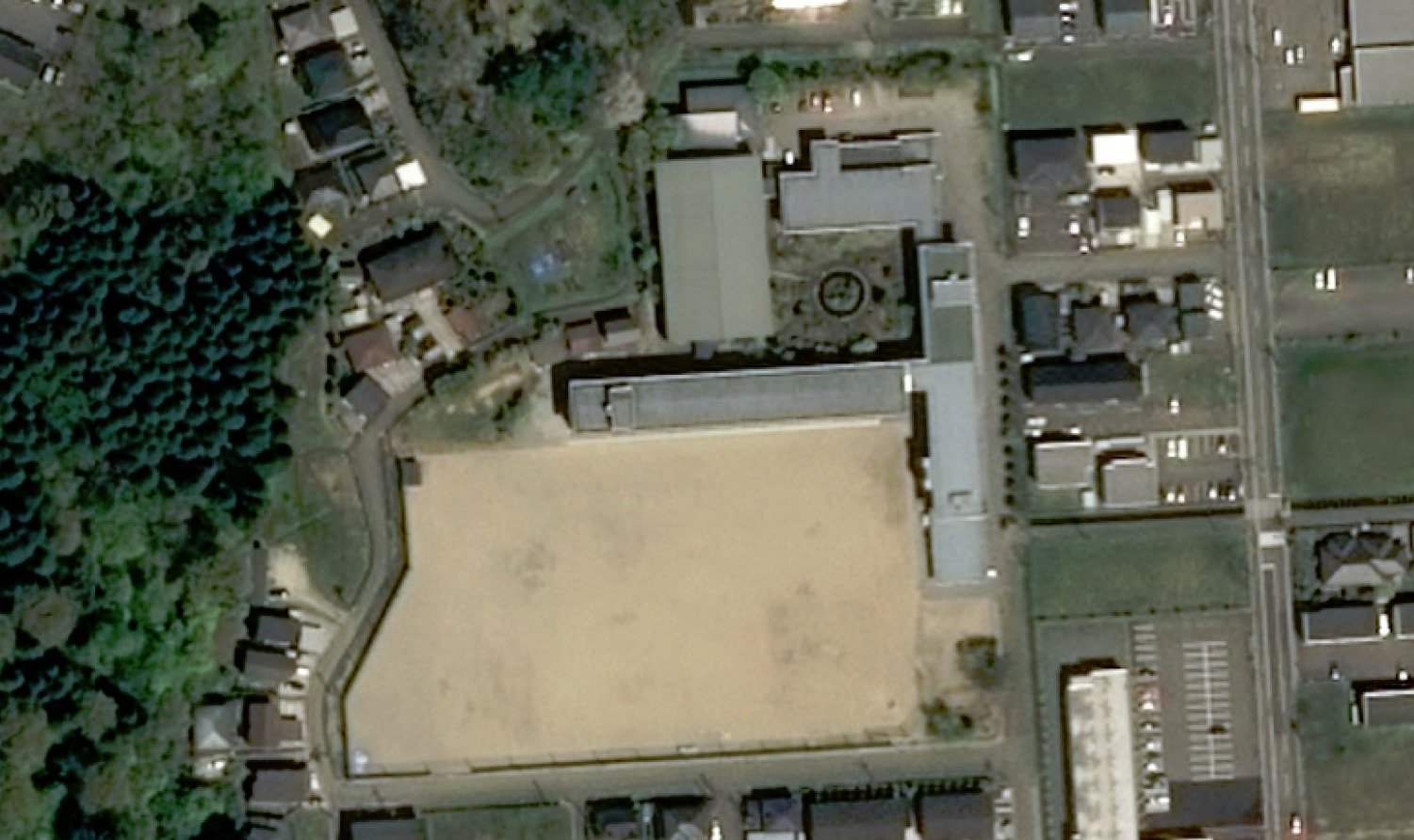
Satellite view on 5 May 2019

==== Gallery ====
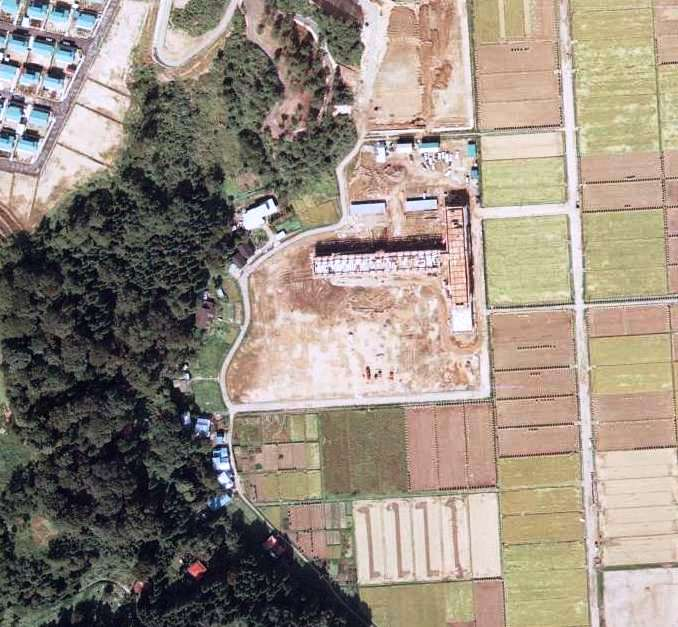
New school building under construction in September 1975

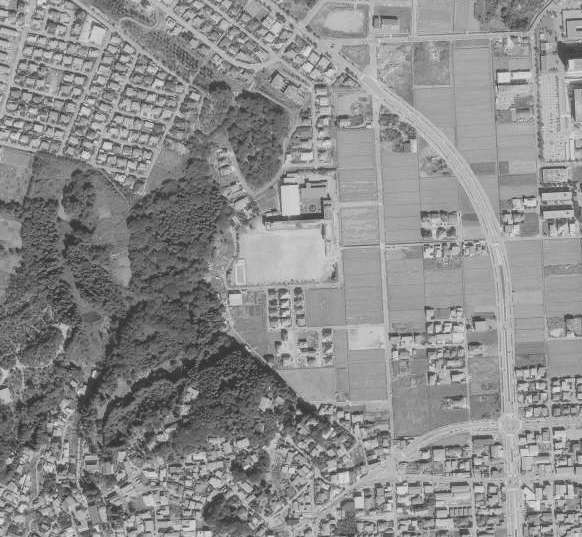
September 1989

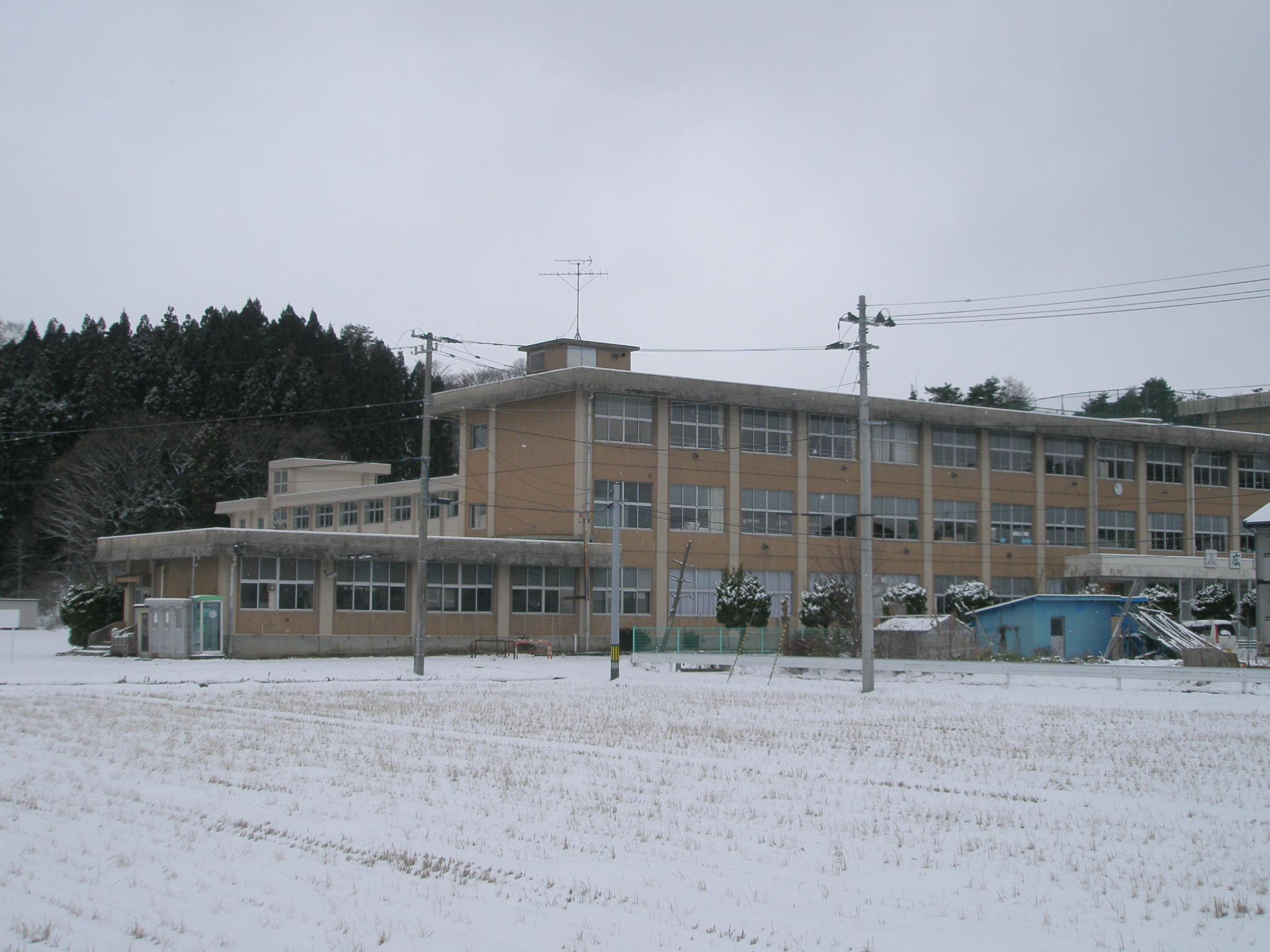
January 2008, Payphone booth was there

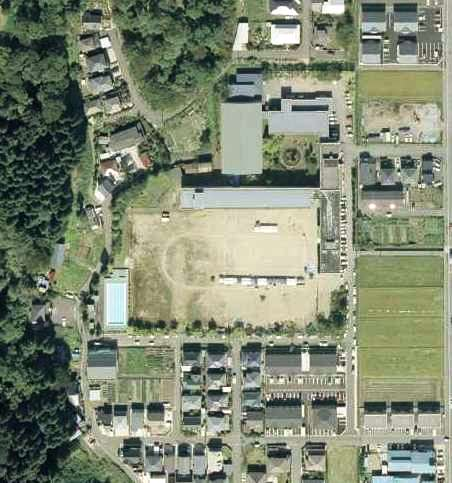
September 2009, Sports Day preparation can be seen

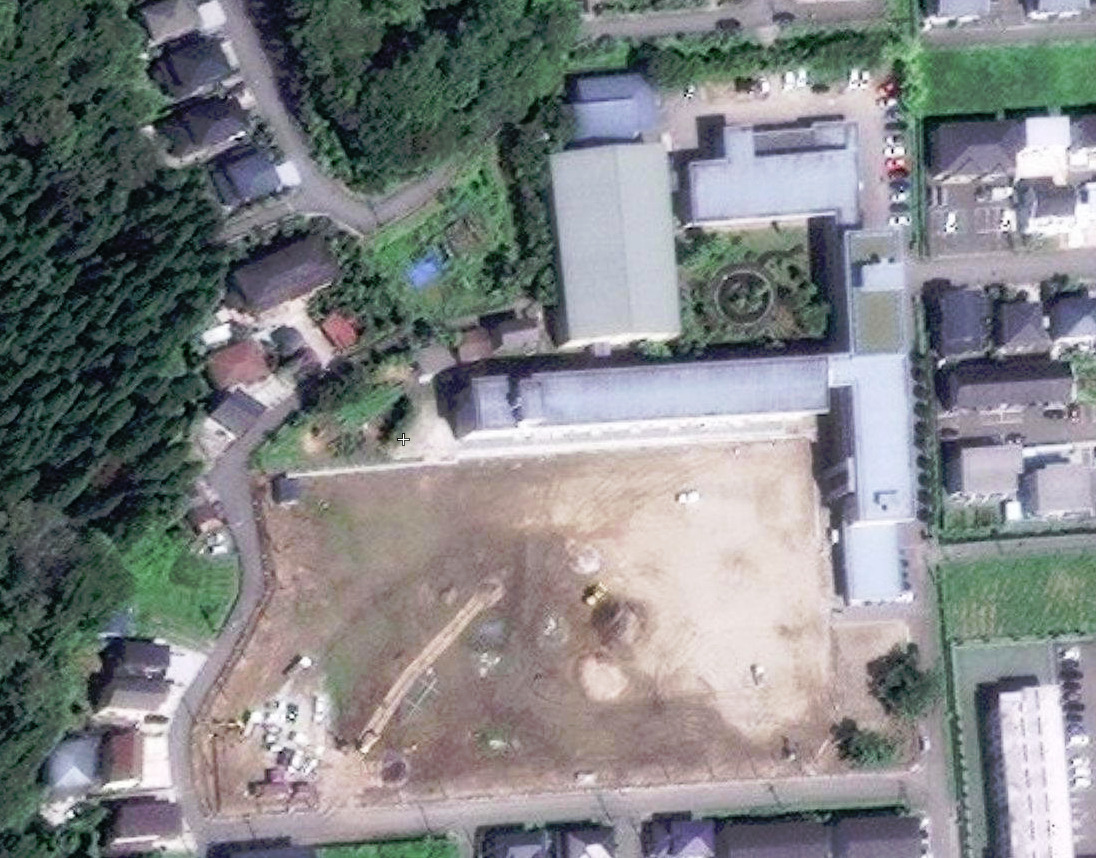
September 2017, Swimming pool was dismantled as students bathe at Central Sports Indoor Pool

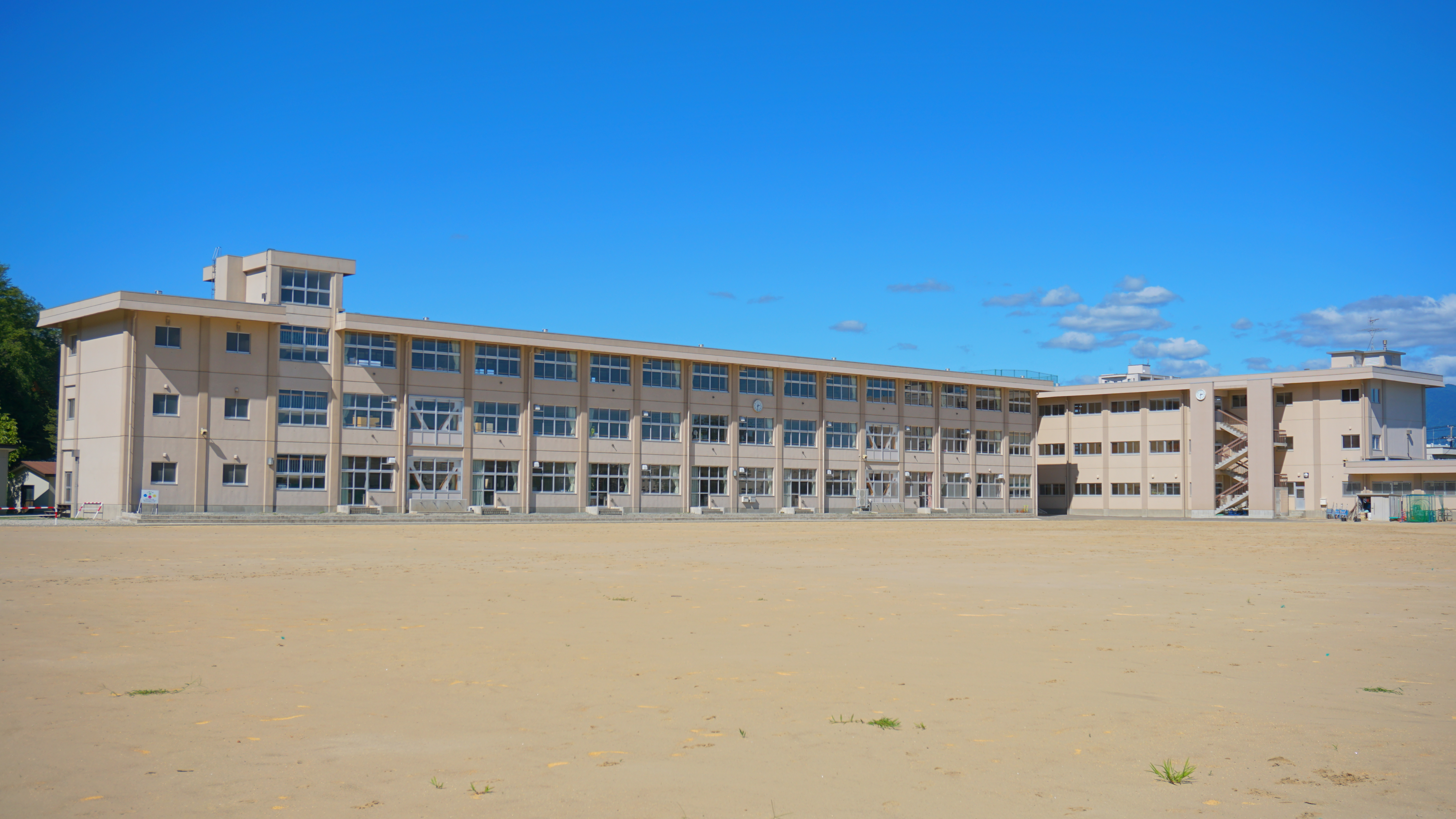
August 2019

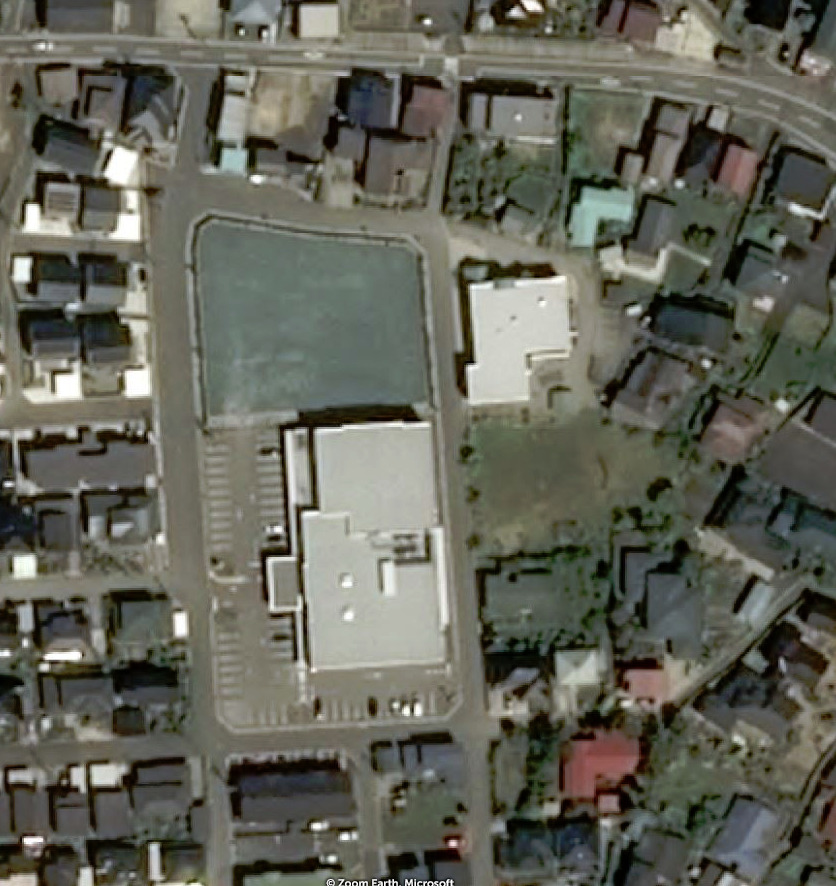
Former Hiroomote Elementary School building site in Tsurubemachi (39°43′27.8″N 140°09′7.6″E)

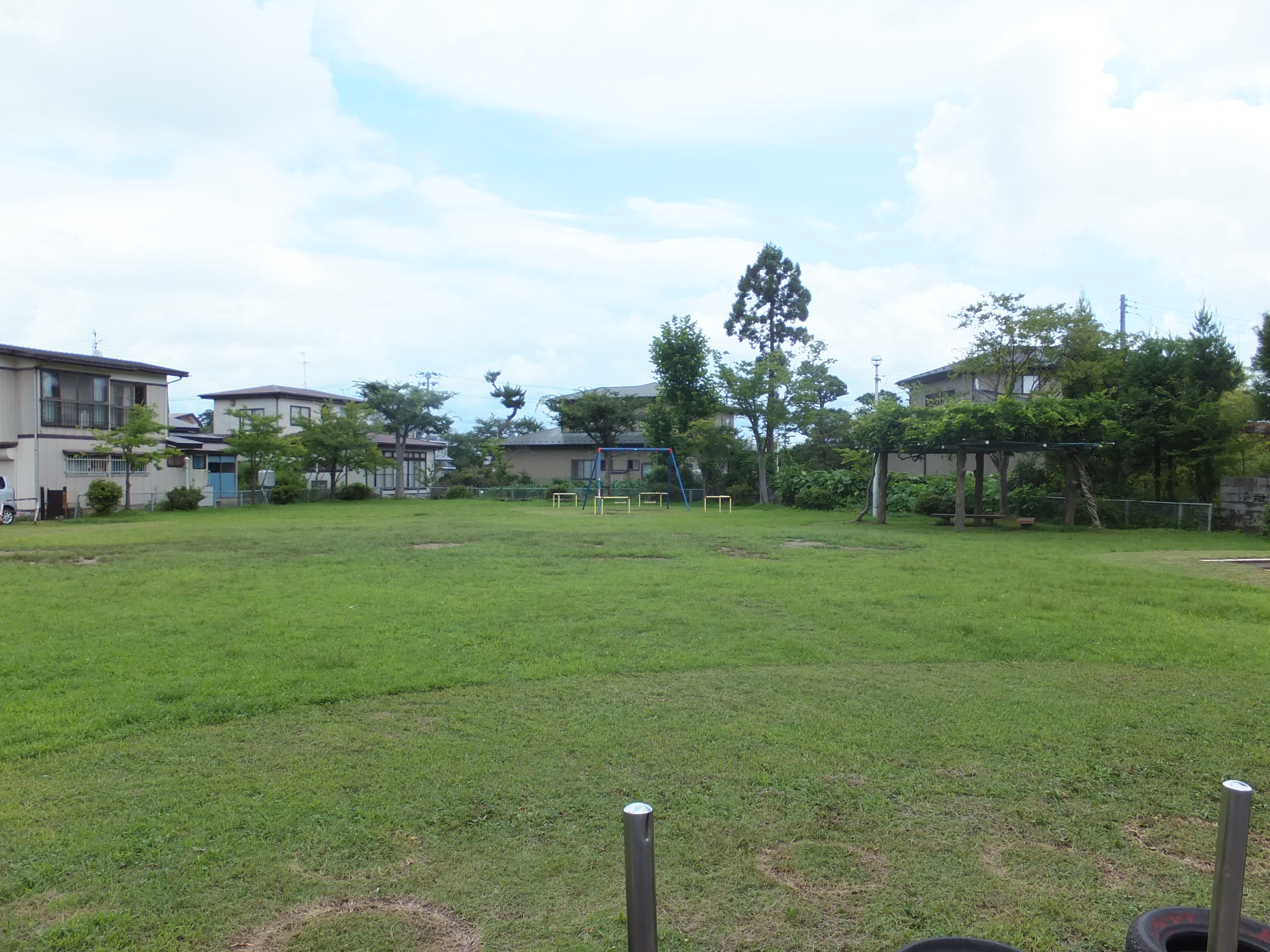
Former Hiroomote Elementary School Playground in Tsurubemachi

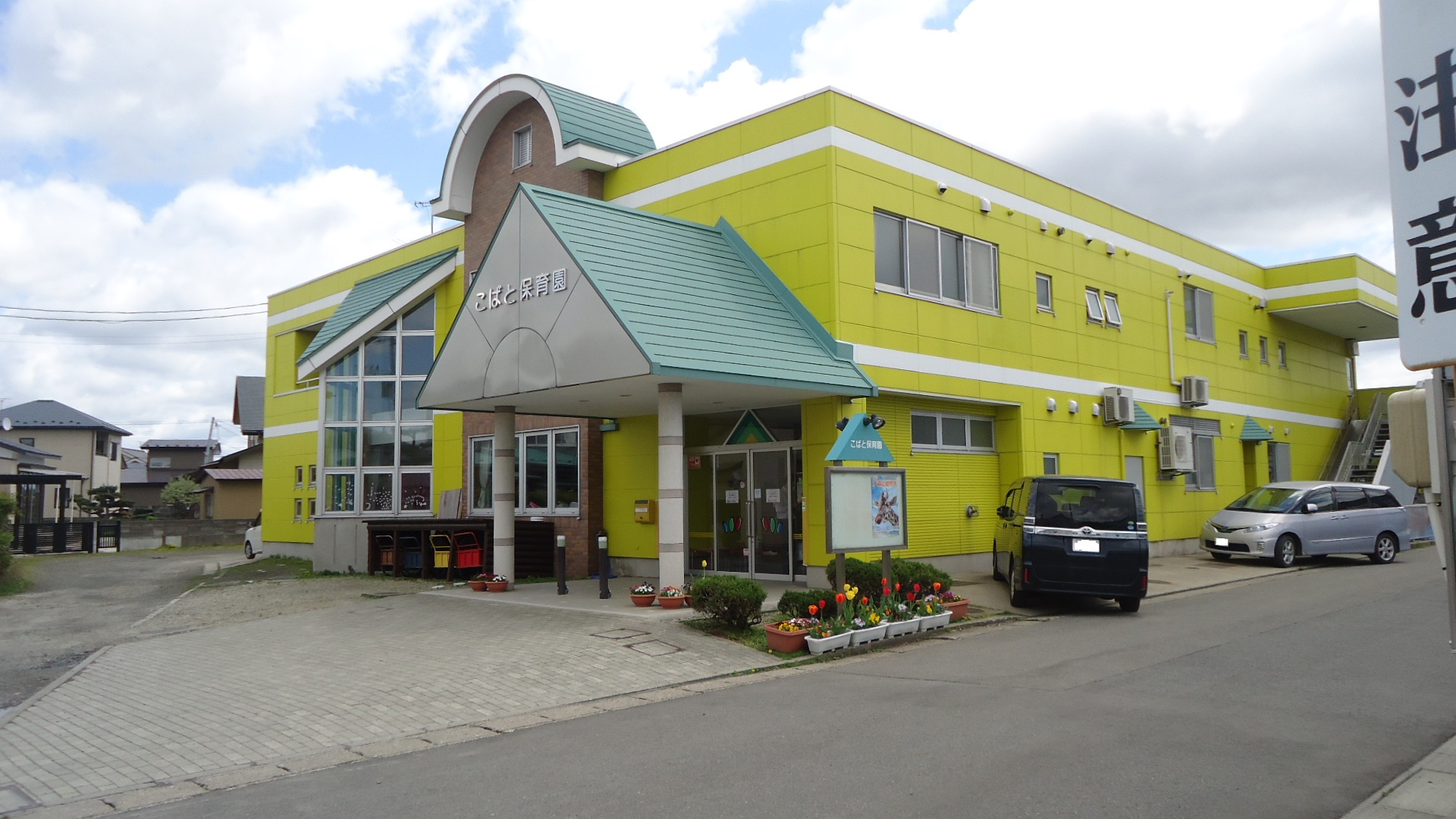
Kobato Nursery was constructed on the northeast part of the former HES site 39°43′28.7″N 140°09′8.2″E)

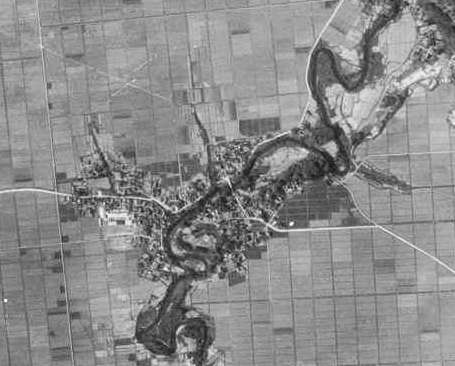
Hiroomote in 1948

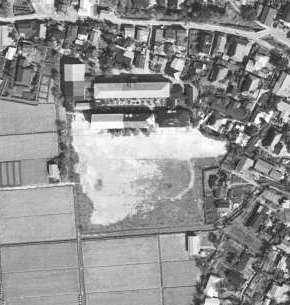
September 1962 (39°43′27.8″N 140°09′7.6″E)

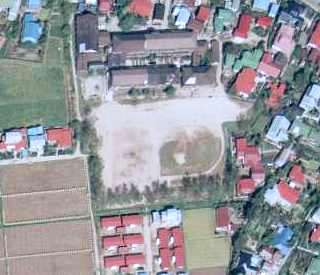
September 1975 (39°43′27.8″N 140°09′7.6″E)

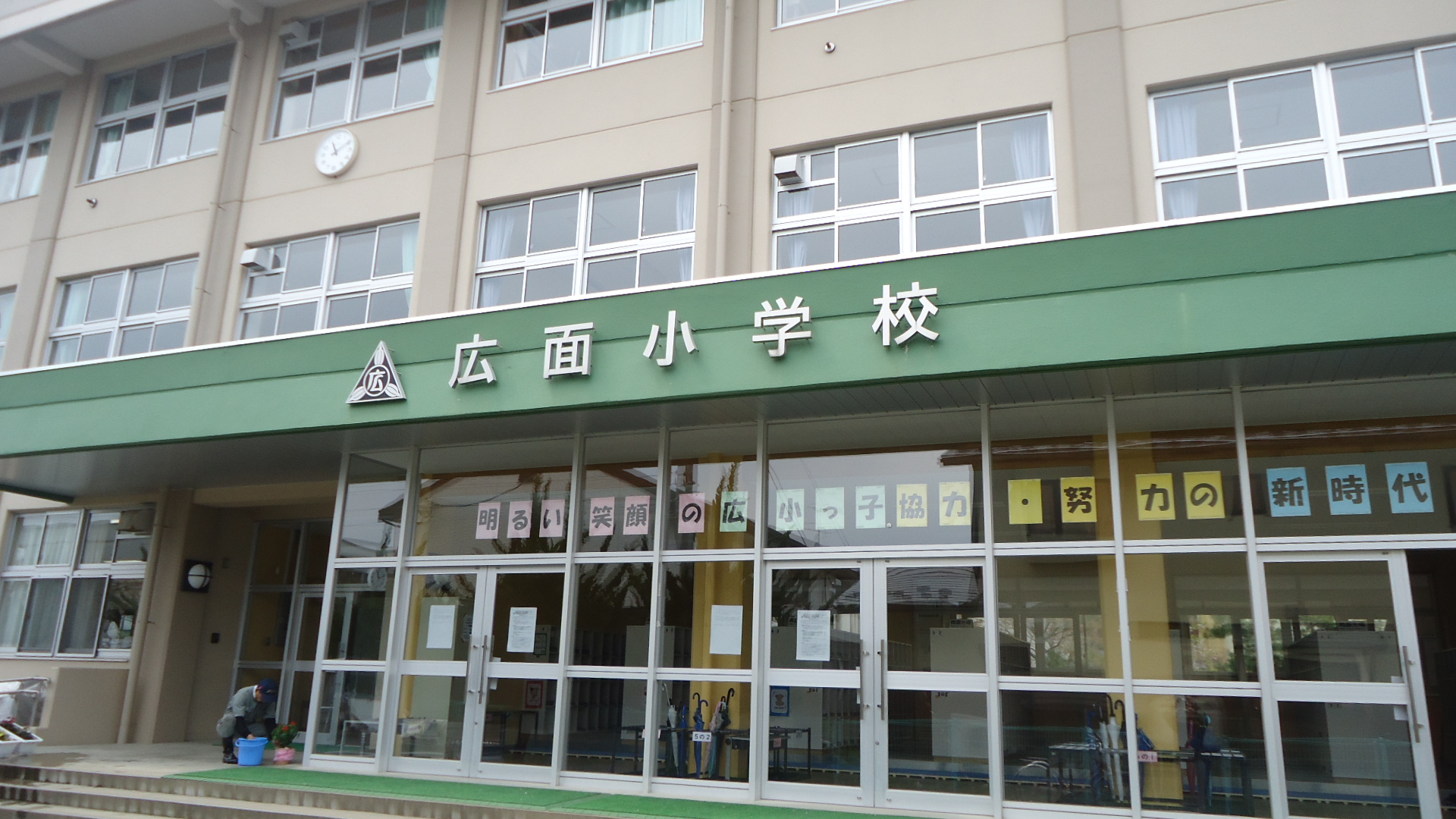
Entrance

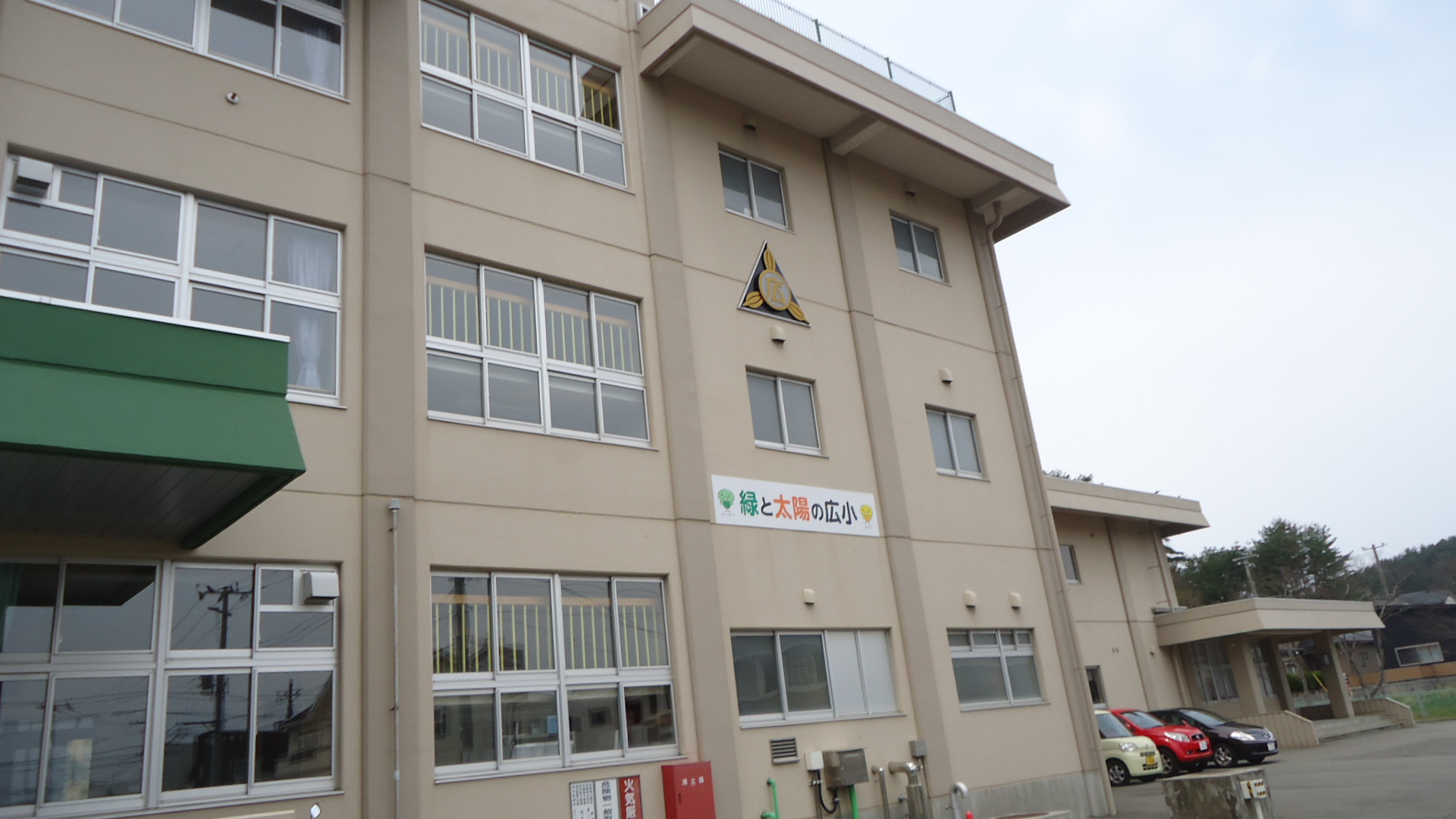
School Badge and Motto Sign

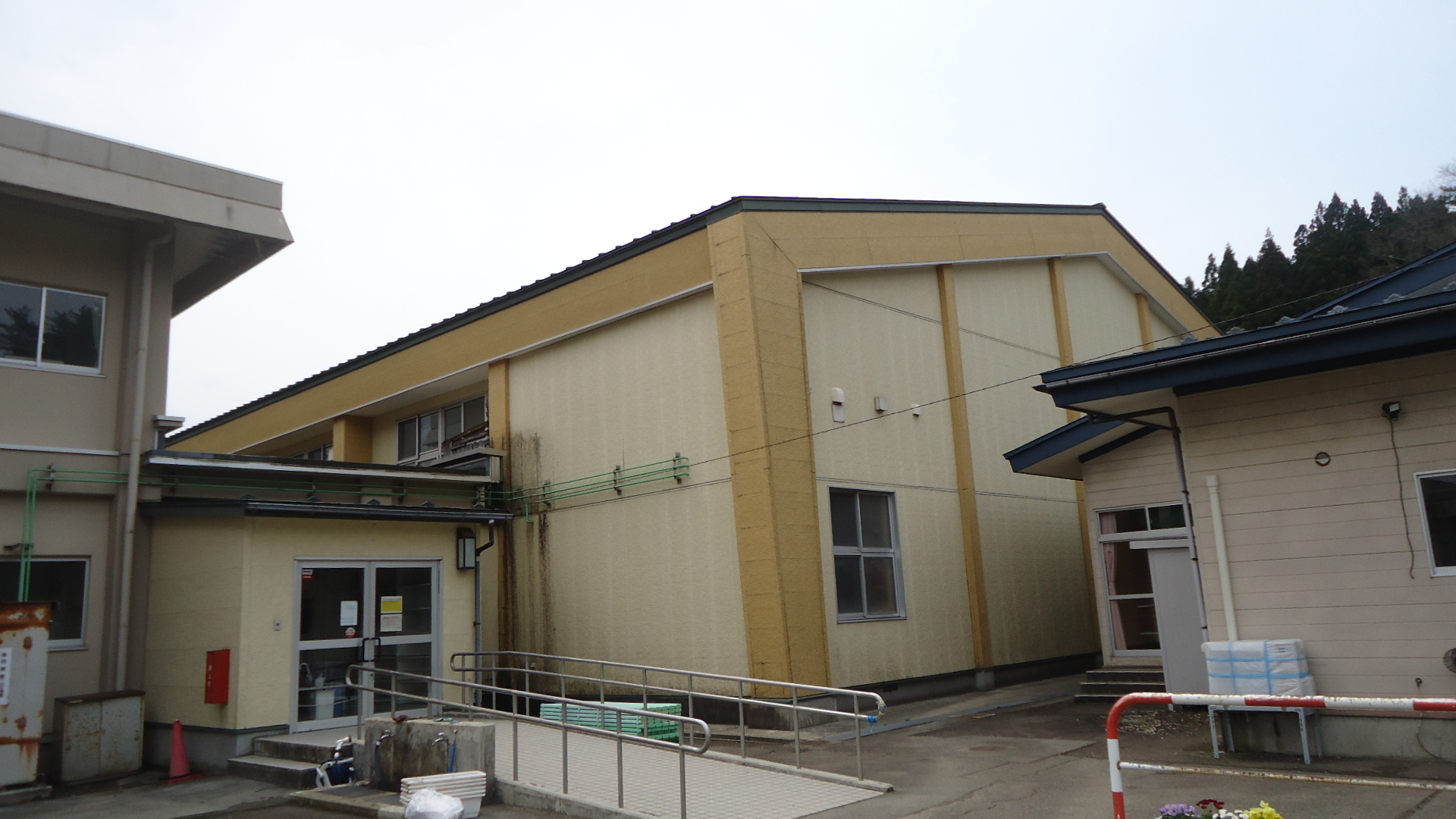
Hirosho Arena

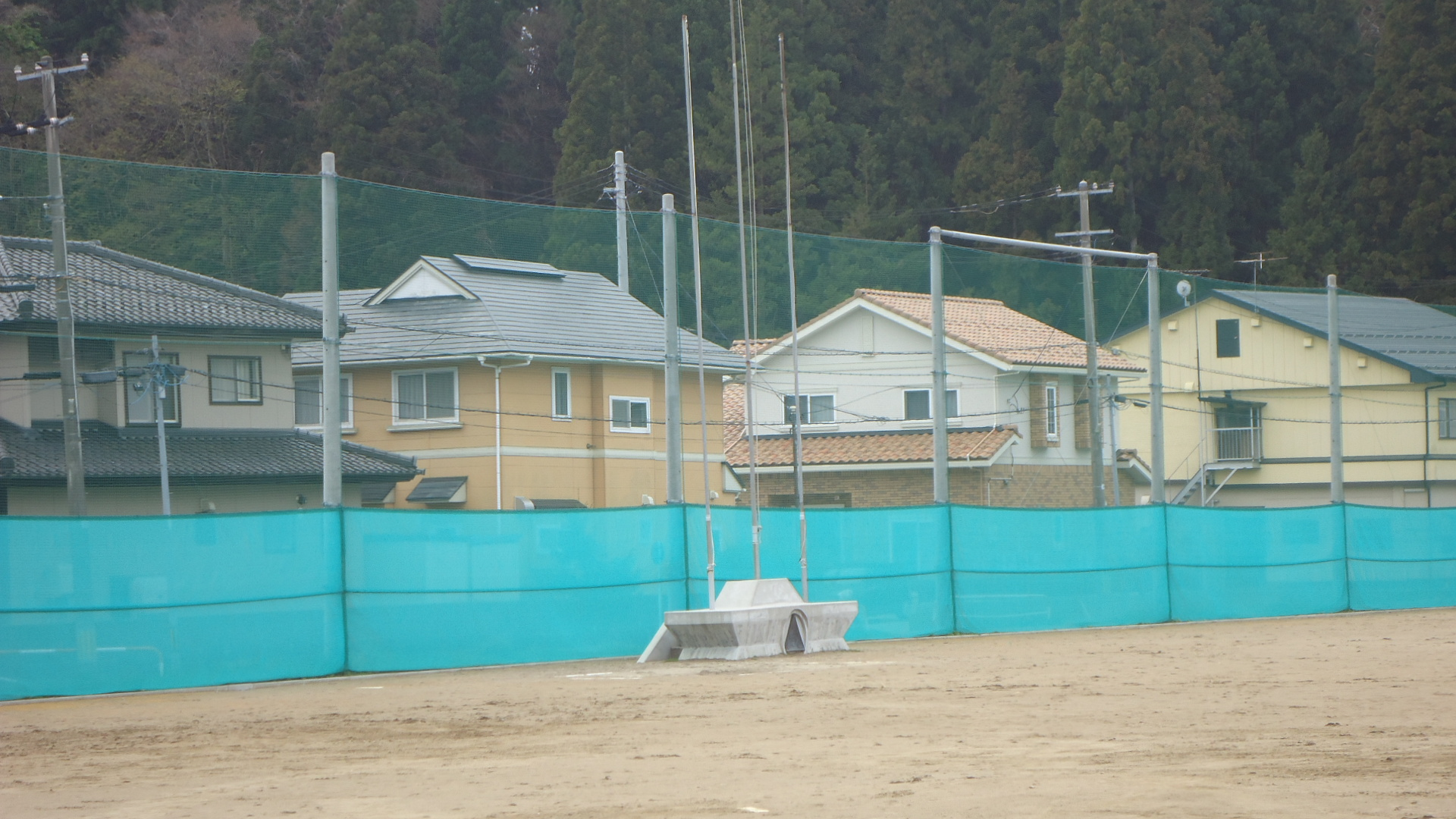
Flag hoist

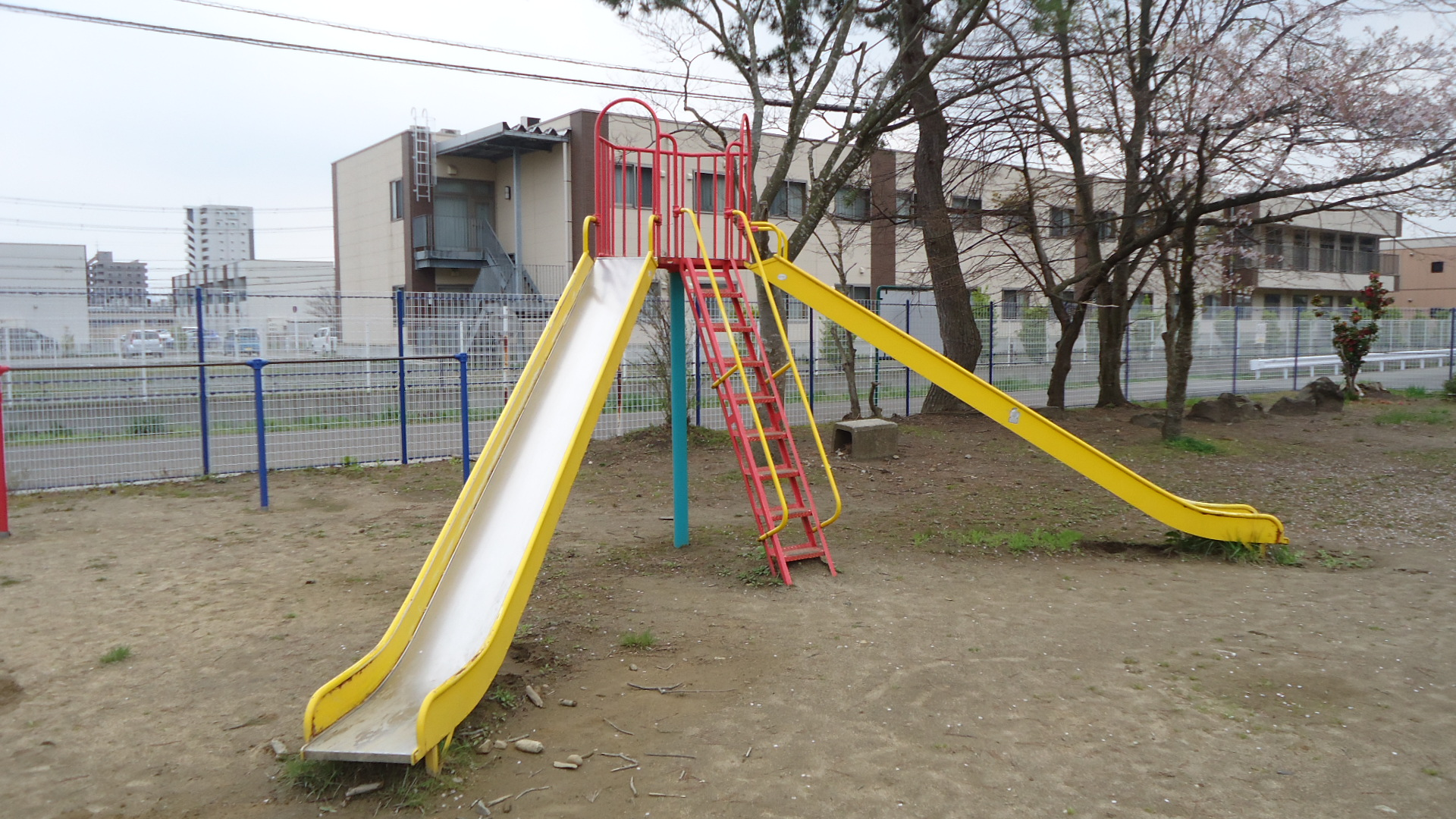
Slide

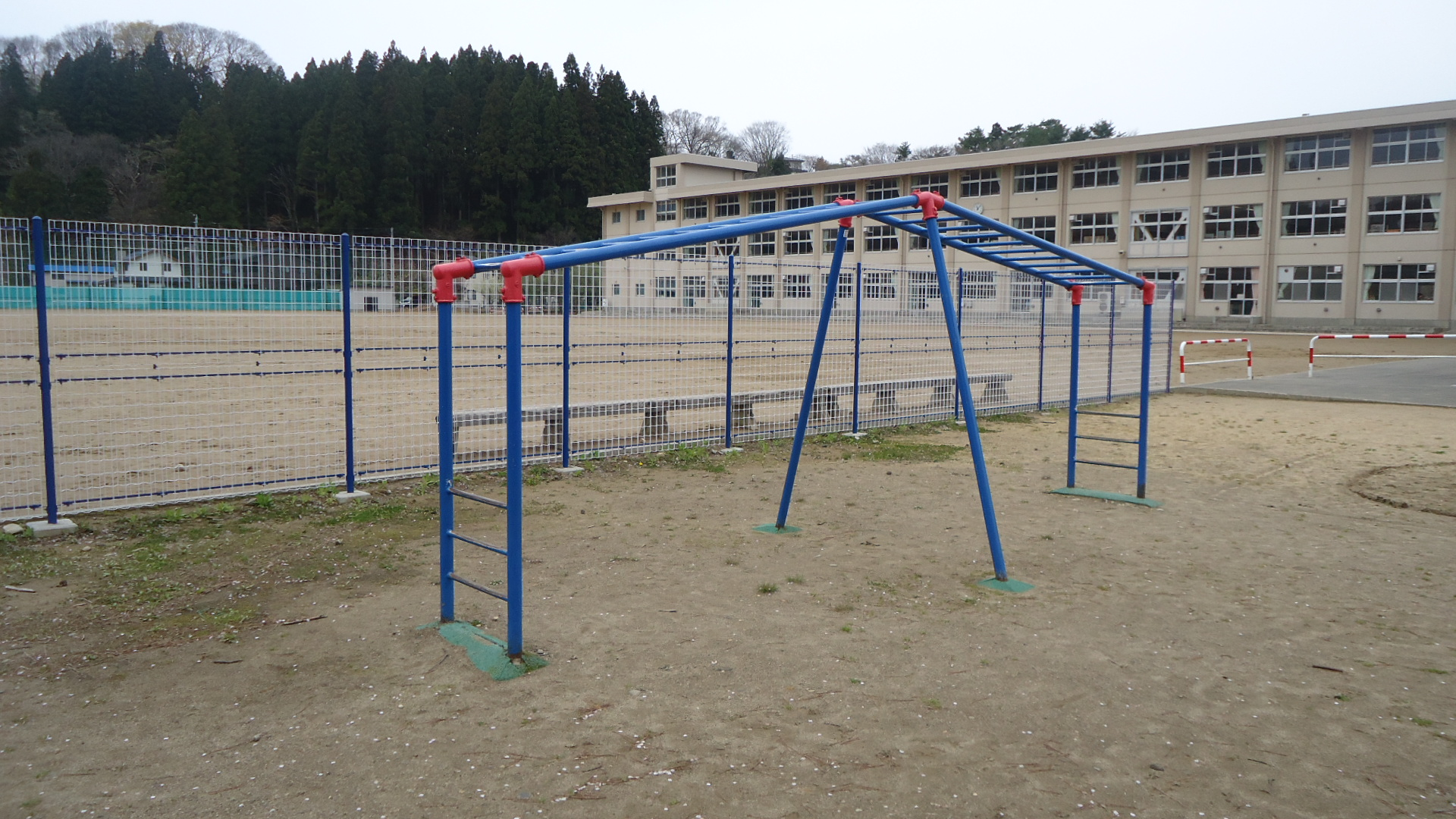
Monkey bars

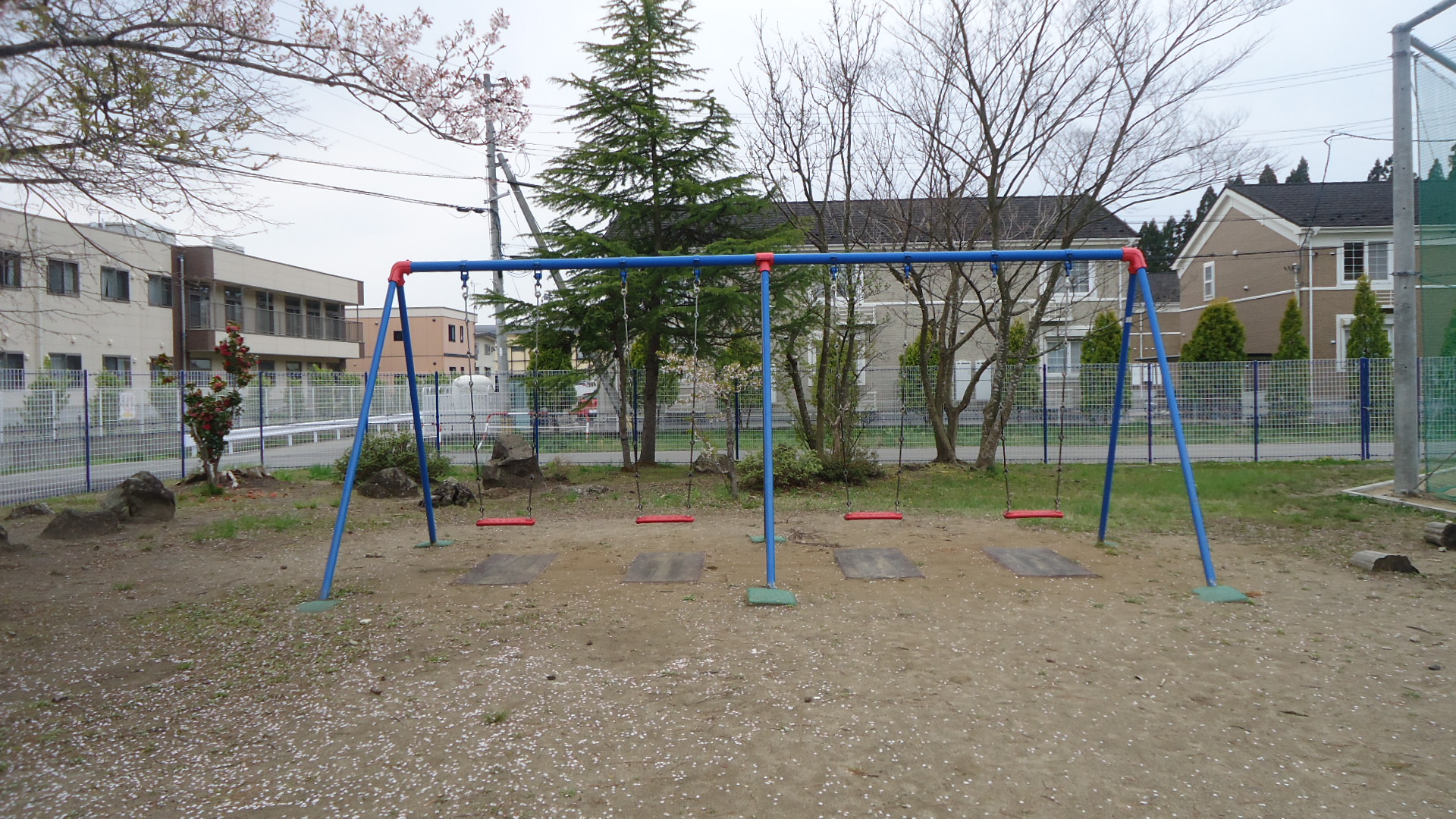
Swings

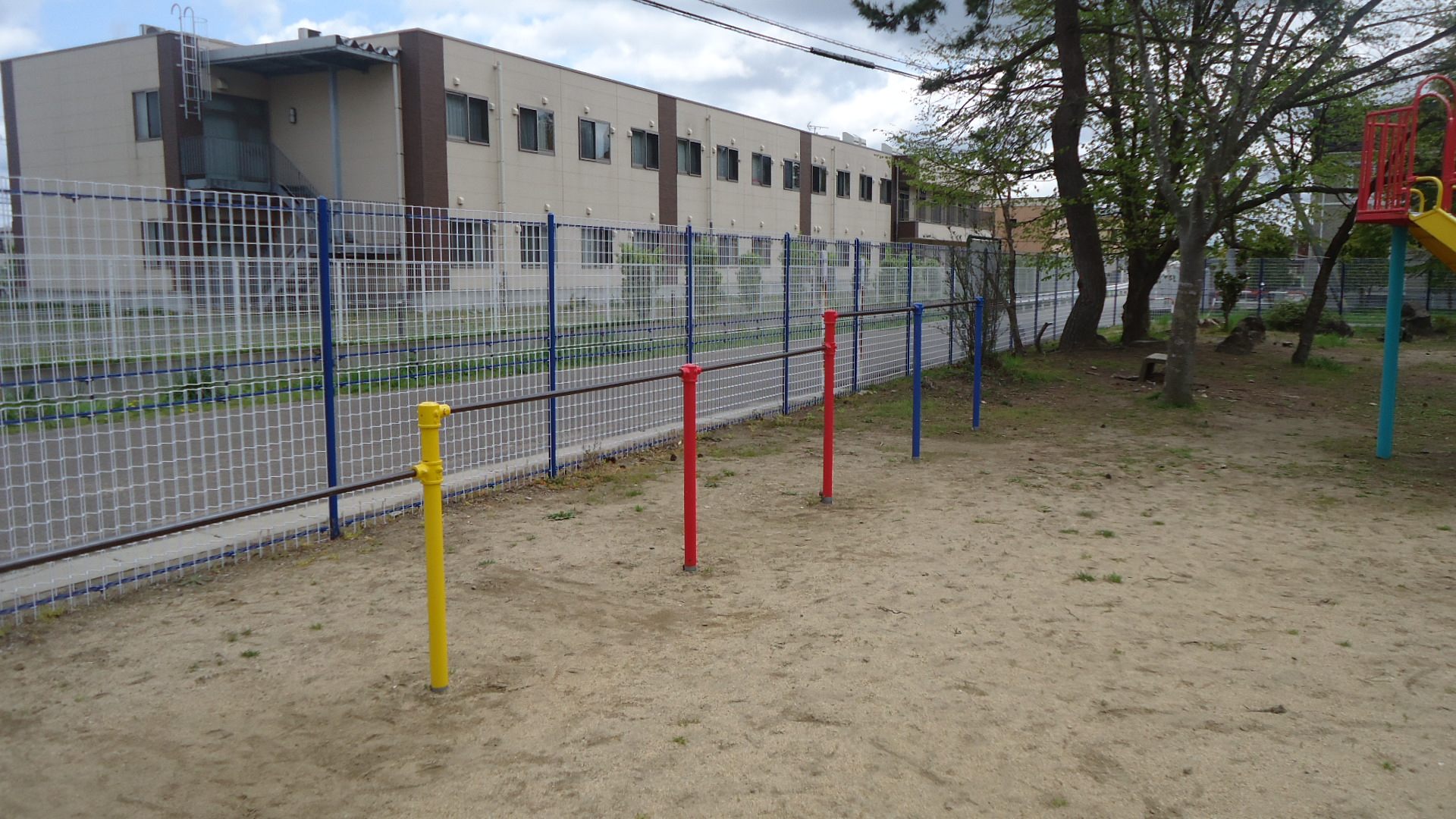
Horizontal bar

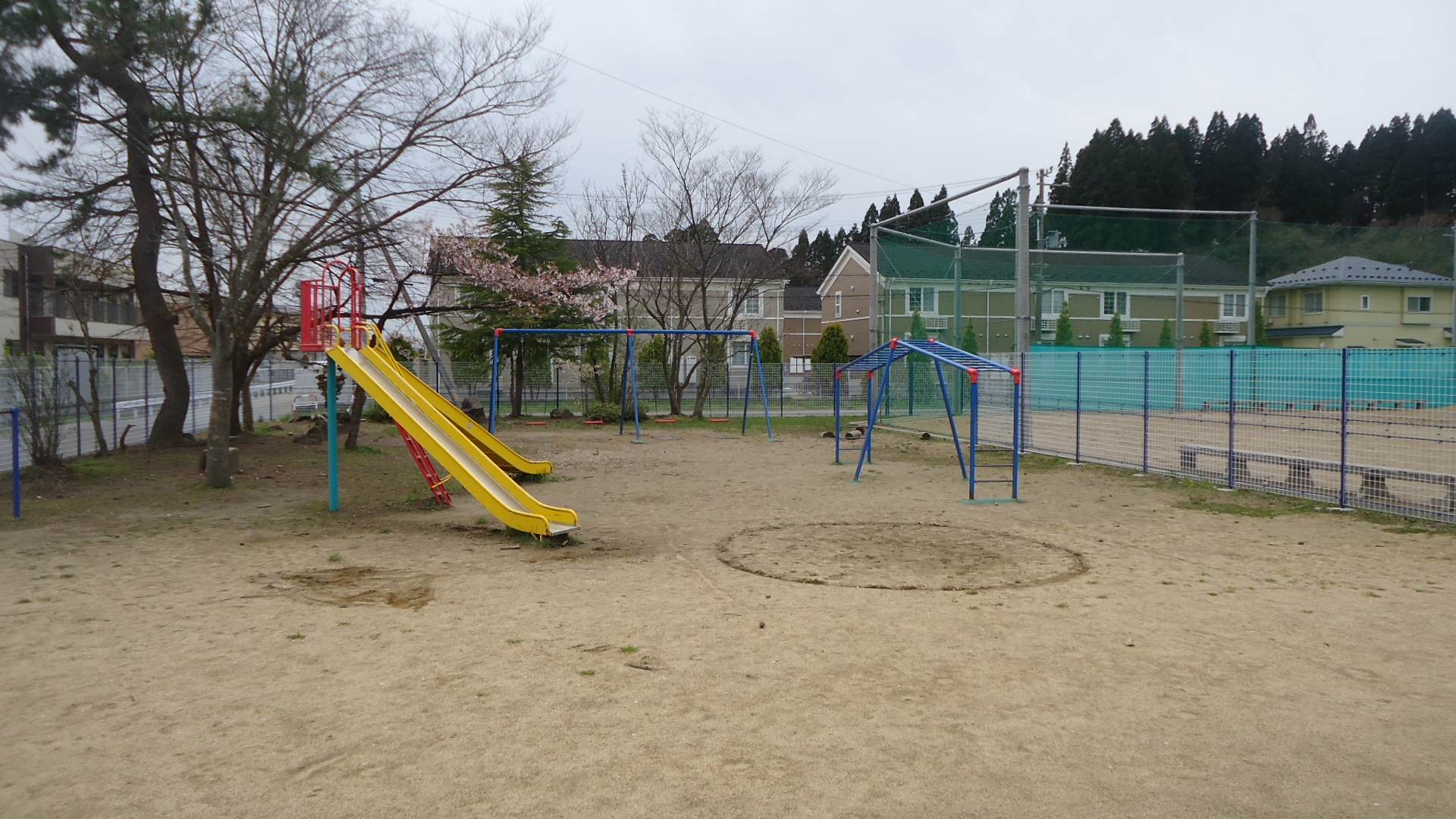

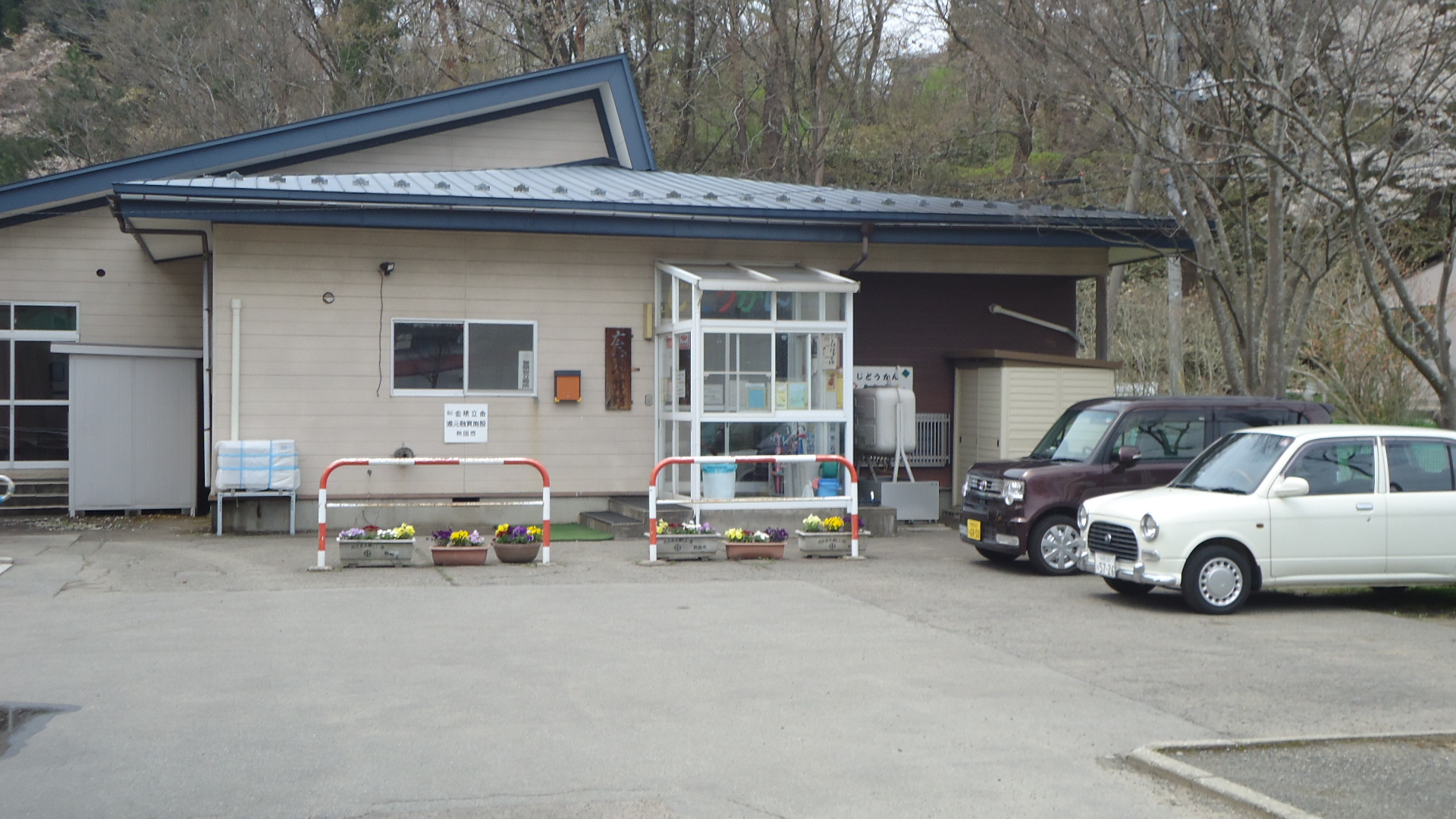
Hiroomote Jidokan

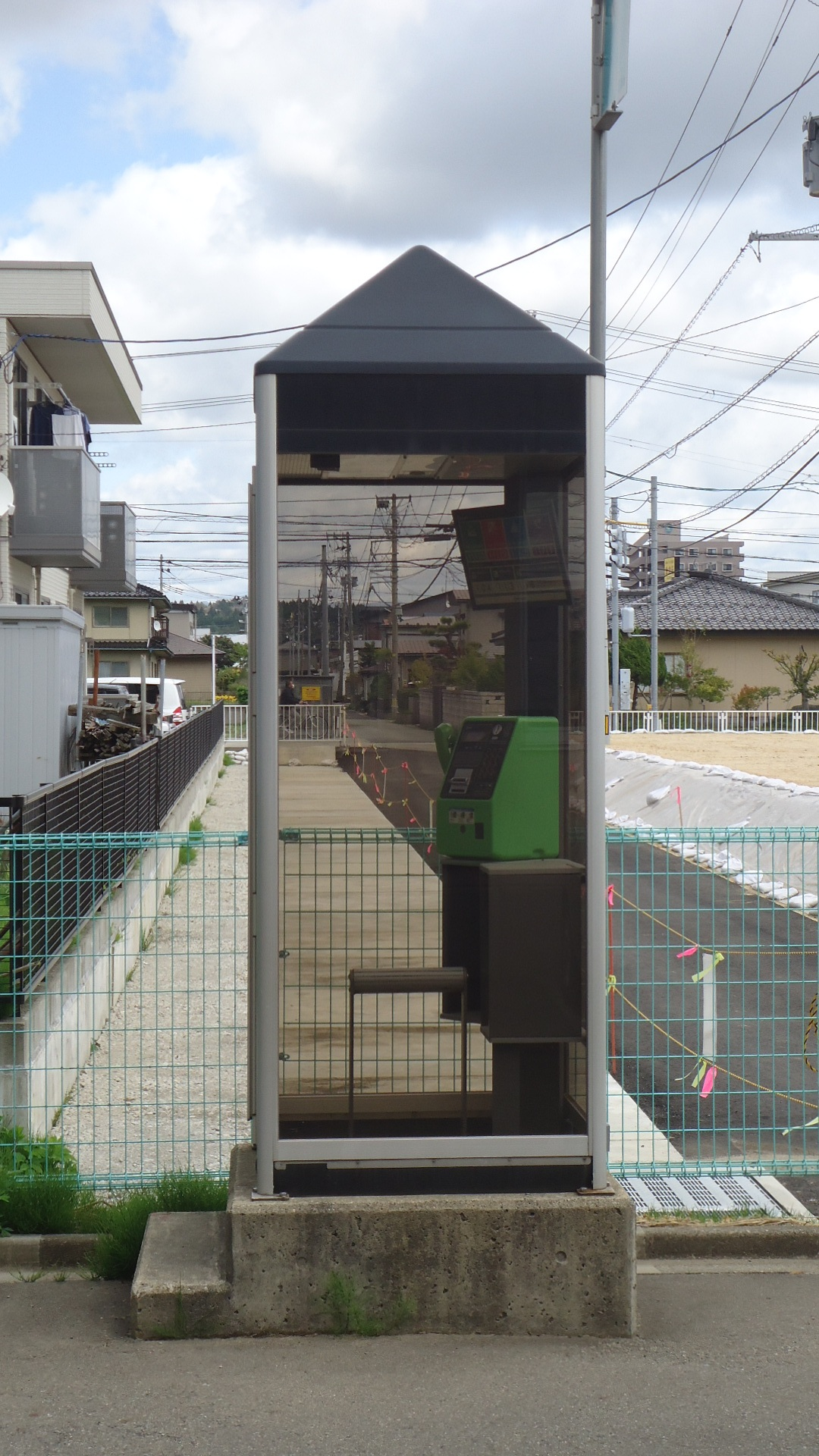
Payphone

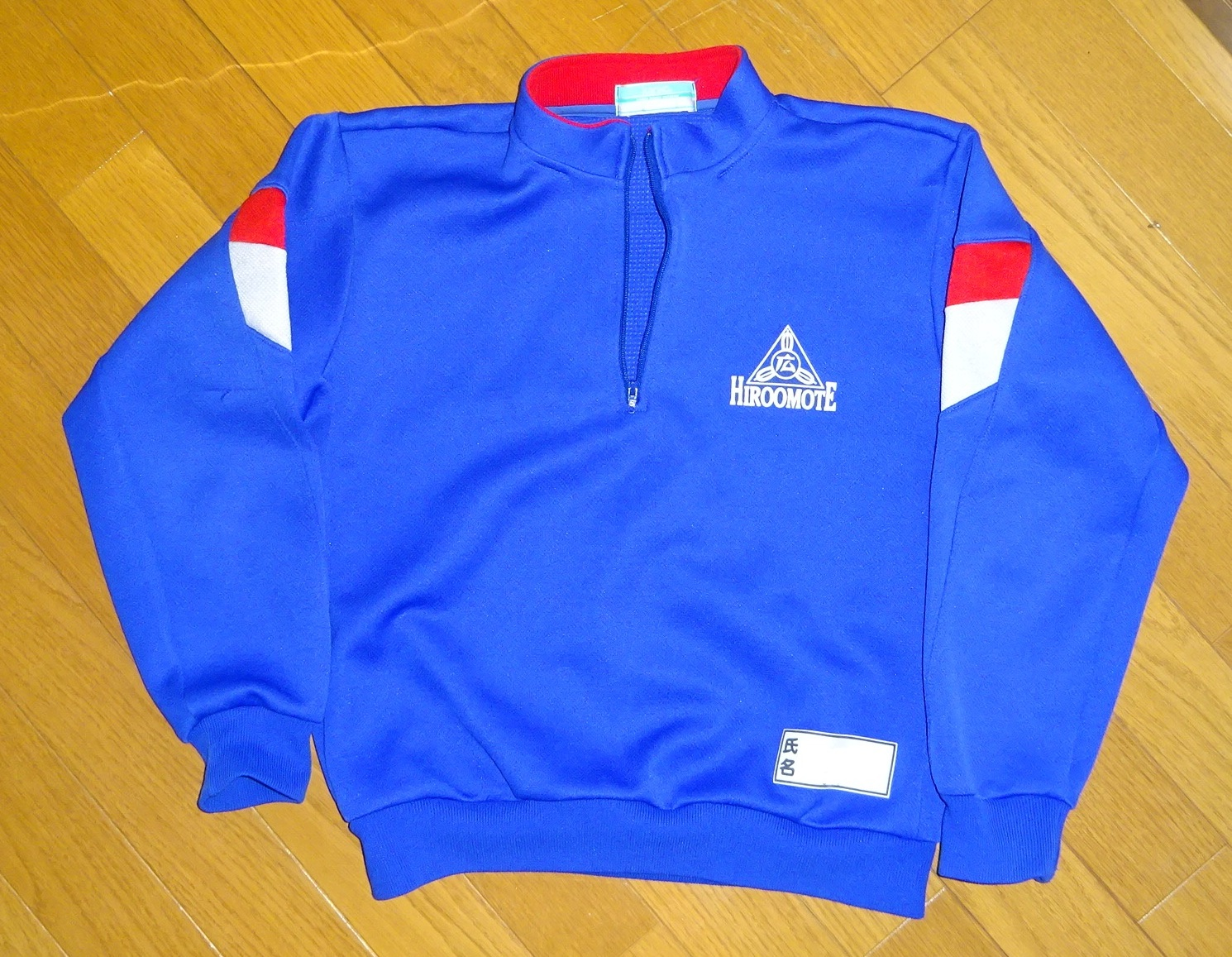
Official Athletic Clothes

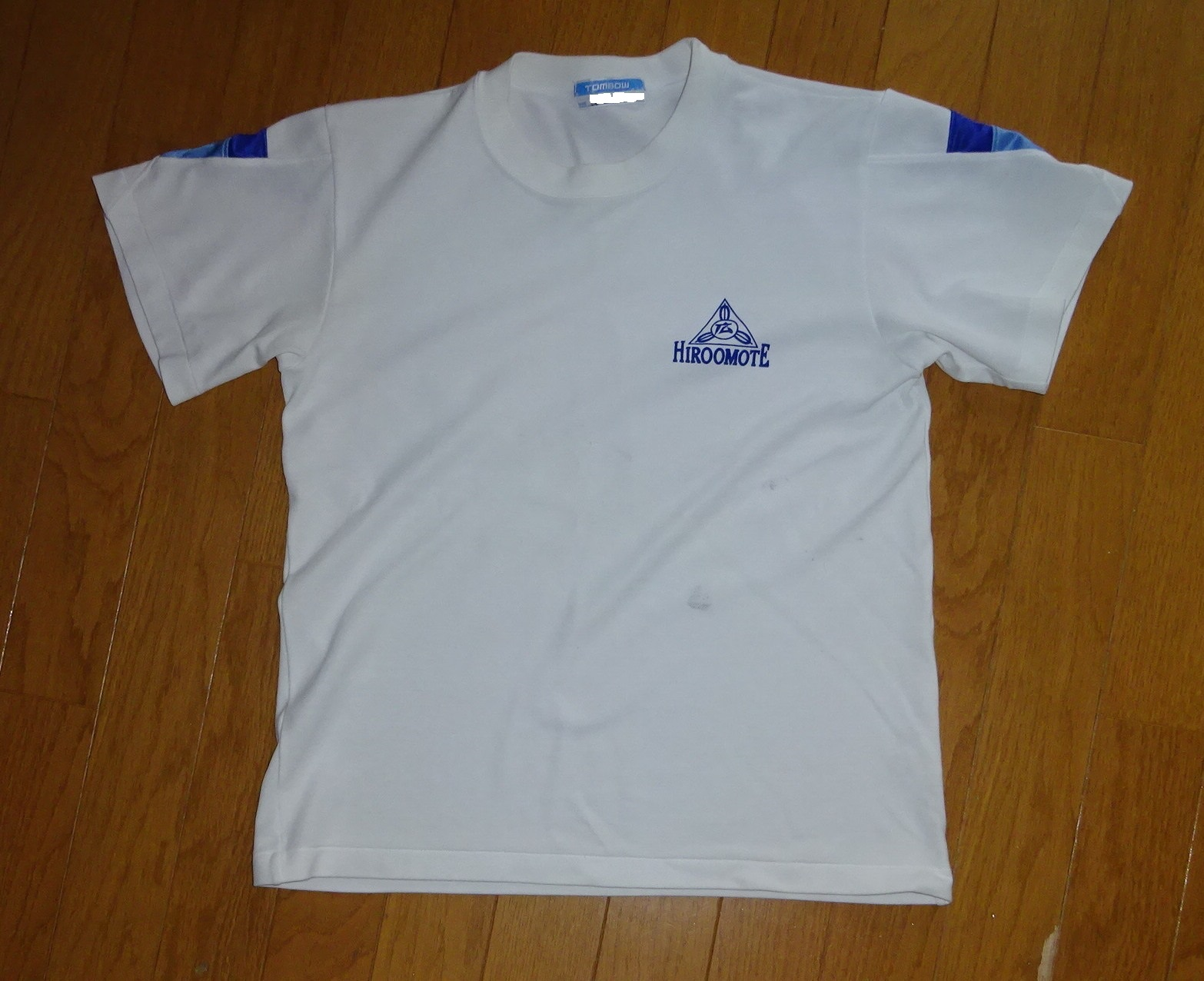
Summer Sports Clothes

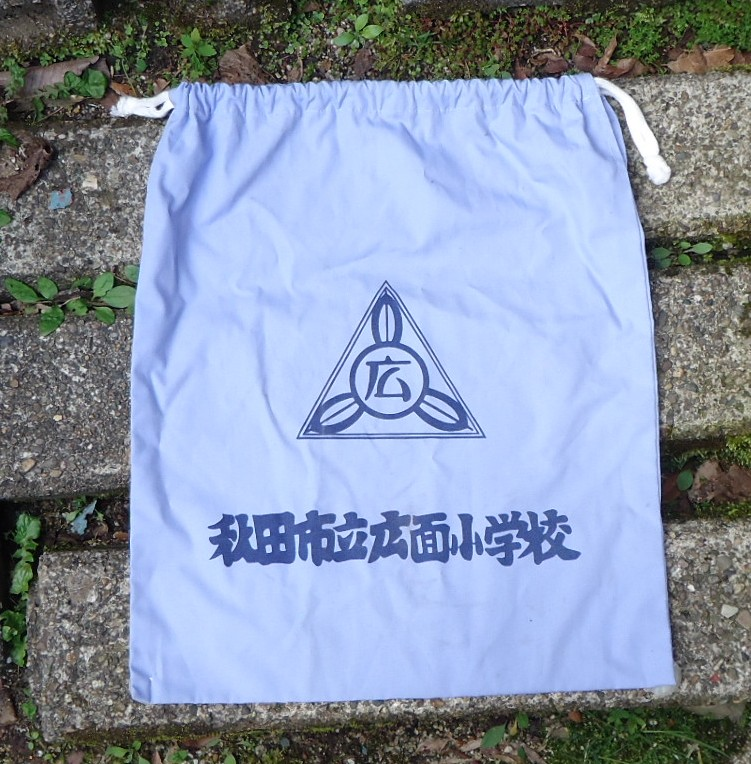
Official shoe bag

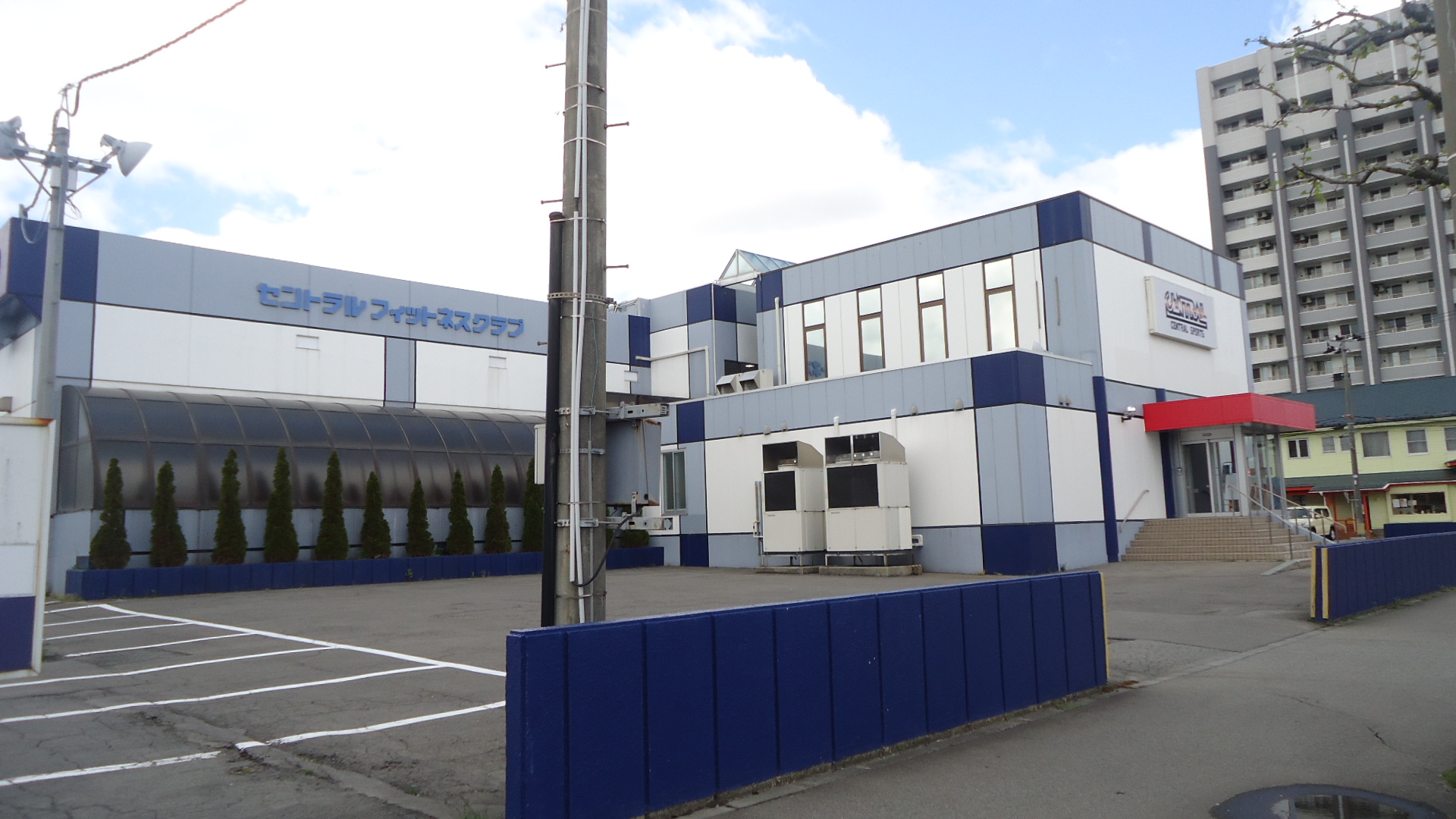
Central Sports Hiroomote (39°43′37.5″N 140°08′57.9″E)

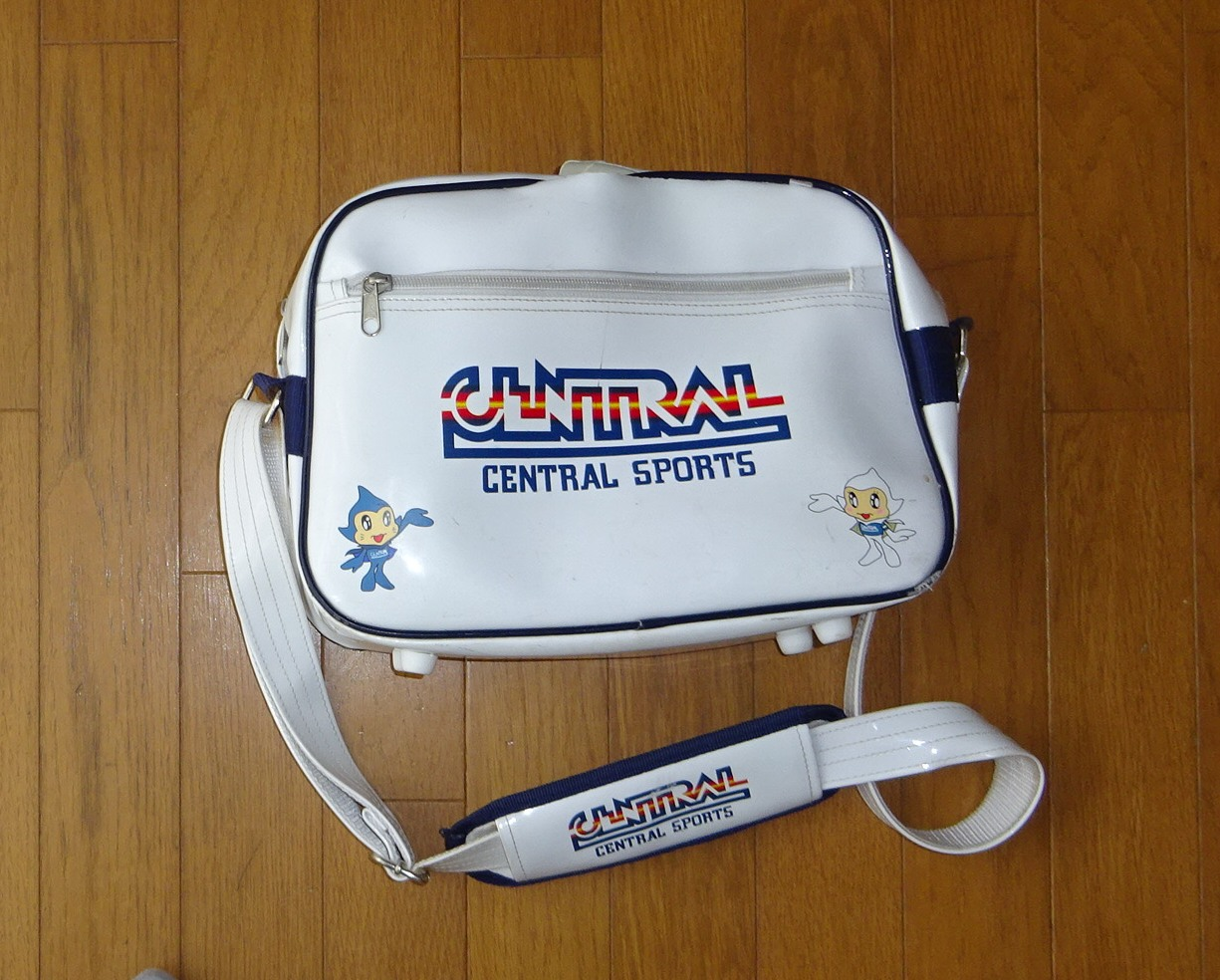
Central Sports Bag

==== Notable alumni ====
- Yukio Endo - olympic gymnastics gold medalist
- Hiroyuki Enoki - Oriental and Pacific Boxing Federation Featherweight Champion boxer
- Ayako Ito - announcer She also played basketball.
- Yuka Komatsu - alpinist
- Kazue Sannomaru - announcer

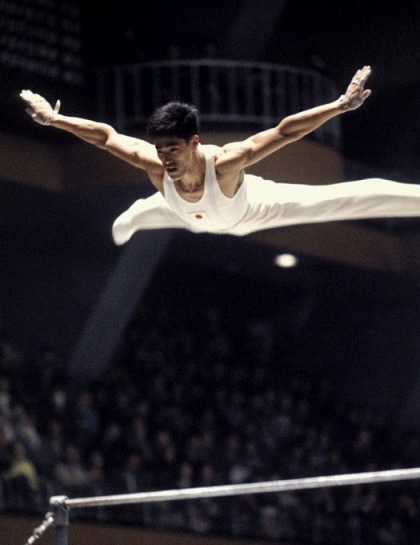
Yukio Endo in 1964

==== Principals ====
Years	Principal
1874-1886	seven Shuza
1886-1887	Keikichi Konuki
1887-1890	Heikichi Sakamoto
1890-1891	Tadataka Kinouchi
1891-1893	Naoji Shimoda
1894-1897	Kosuke Aoki
1898-1909	Yunosuke Matsuyama
1910-1911	Chozo Hirasawa
1912-1913	Masashi Sato
1914-1916	Kyukichi Goto
1917-1918	Yasushi Ono
1919-1920	Masashi Sato
1921	Toshio Ito
1922-1924	Uira Sato
1925-1927	Kikuji Sato
1928-1929	Isamu Negishi
1930-1931	Kikuji Sato
1932	Etsujiro Matsuhashi
1933-1939	Tokunosuke Sugai
1940	Koji Masgi
1941-1943	Kuemon Sekine
1944-1945	Kinikazu Kondo
1946-1948	Saburo Kato
1949-1953	Yasuo Tan
1954	Masanao Miura
1955-1956	Kenji Takai
1957-1958	Masutaro Kagaya
1959-1960	Koichi Takahashi
1961-1962	Keijiro Shindo
1963-1965	Seike Nakayama
1966-1967	Yoshio Hiratsuka
1968-1969	Shigekichi Toyoshima
1970-1971	Takao Omori
1972-1974	Kinzaburo Tsuruya
1975-1978	Io Kikuchi
1979-1980	Hiroshi Konno
1981-1983	Nao Honda
1984-1987	Ryusuke Sasaki
1988-1989	Kiyoshi Horii
1990-1994	Yuichi Sakurada
1995-1996	Magoichi Sawaguchi
1997-1998	Katsumi Oishi
1999-2001	Masatoshi Saga
2002-2004	Makoto Hagawa
2005-2006	Yasuji Sasaki
2007-2010	Mari Sagawa
2011-2013	Shumi Saito
2014-2015	Yuriko Takahashi
2016-2017	Manabu Chiba
2018-2019	Kazuki Hoshino
2020–present	Tomoko Owada

==== Surroundings ====
- Central Sports - co-founded by alumni Yukio Endo
- Taiheizan Miyoshi Shrine
- Akita University Hospital
- Tegatayama Bridge

=== Joto Junior High School ===
Joto Junior High School
- 秋田市立城東中学校

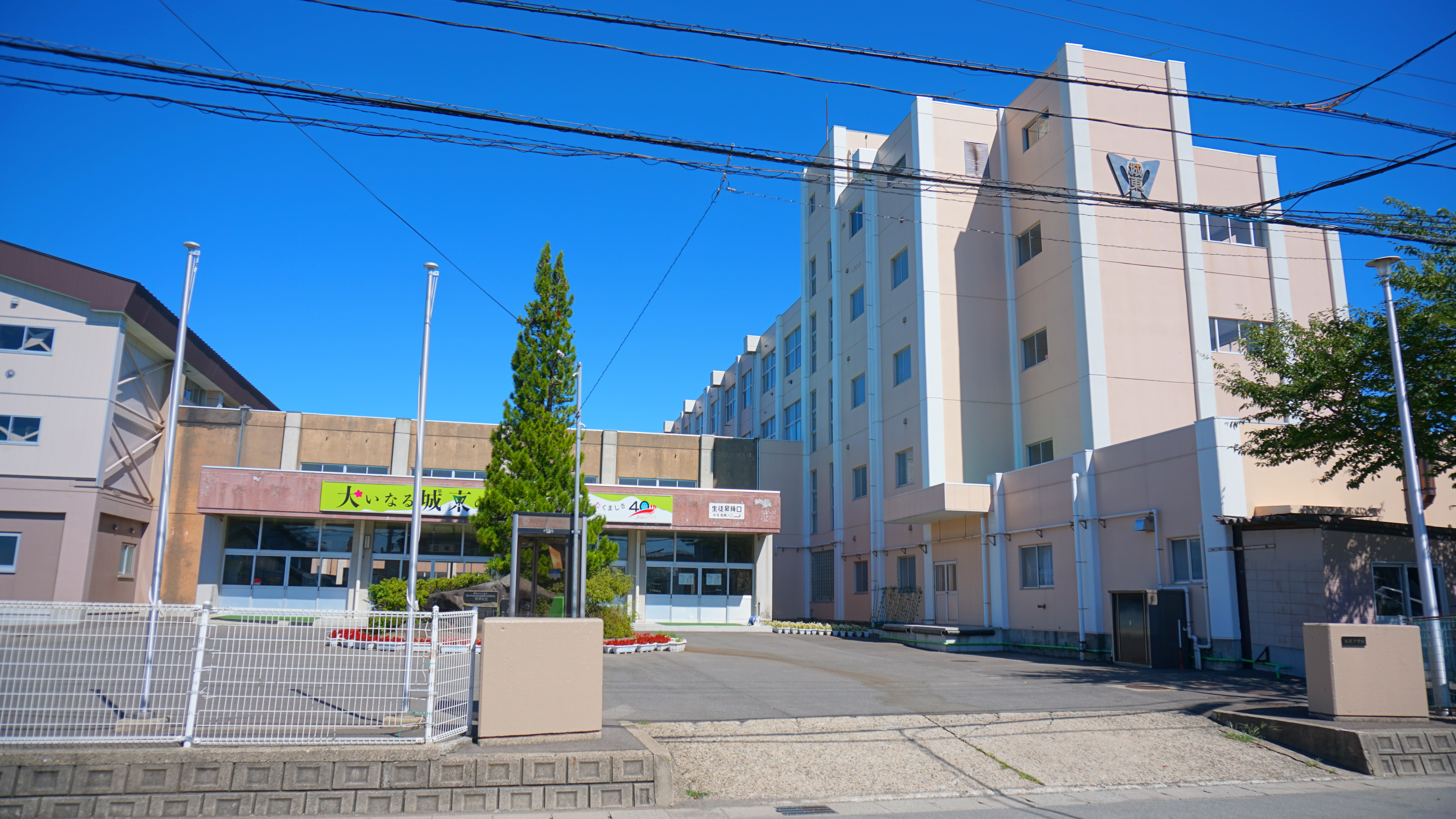

Location
- Hiroomote Aza Nabenuma 17; Akita City 010-0041

Information
- Established: 1 April 1979
- Campus size: 8,570 m^{2}
- Area: 21,708 m^{2}
- Rival: Sakura Junior High School

Akita Municipal Joto Junior High School (秋田市立城東中学校, Akitashiritu Jōtō Chūgakkō), referred to as "Joto" by most, is a public school in Japan. It teaches teenagers between seventh and ninth grades. Akita's Joto claimed its maiden title at Japan's National Junior High School Baseball Championship at Yokohama Stadium in 1982.

== Shrines and temples ==
- Taiheizan Miyoshi Shrine
- Isurugi Shrine
- Honnenji

== Public services ==
- E-Pal
- Joto Koban The second largest kōban in Tohoku
- Joto Fire Station Hiroomote Branch

== Post offices ==
- Hiroomote Post Office
- Yashikiden Post Office
- Myoden Post Office

== Gallery ==
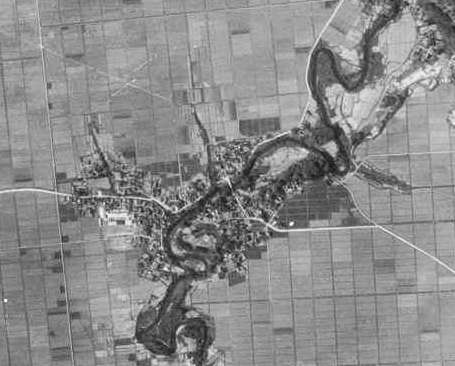
Yanaisado in 1948

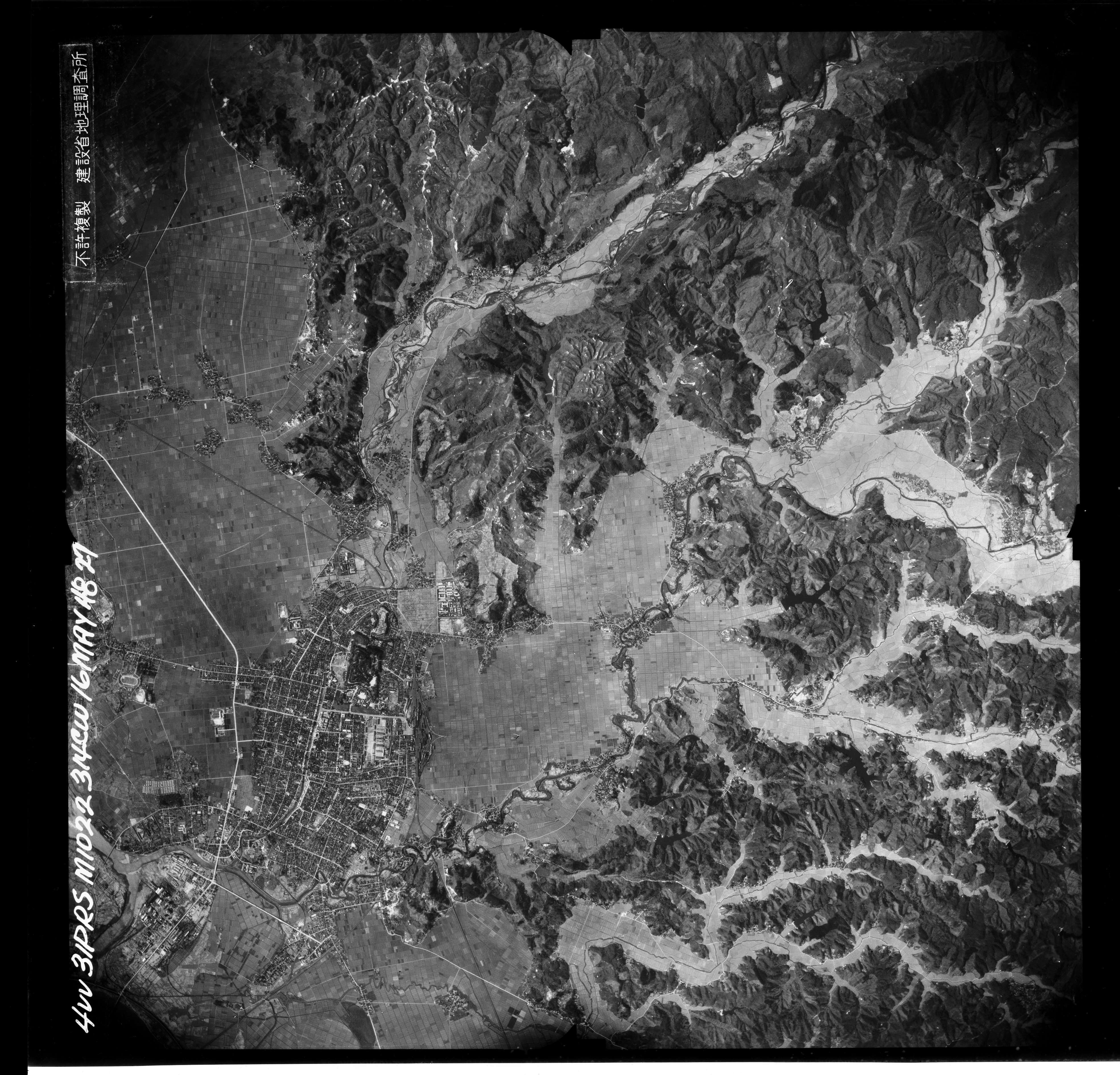
Hiroomote and Akita City in 1948

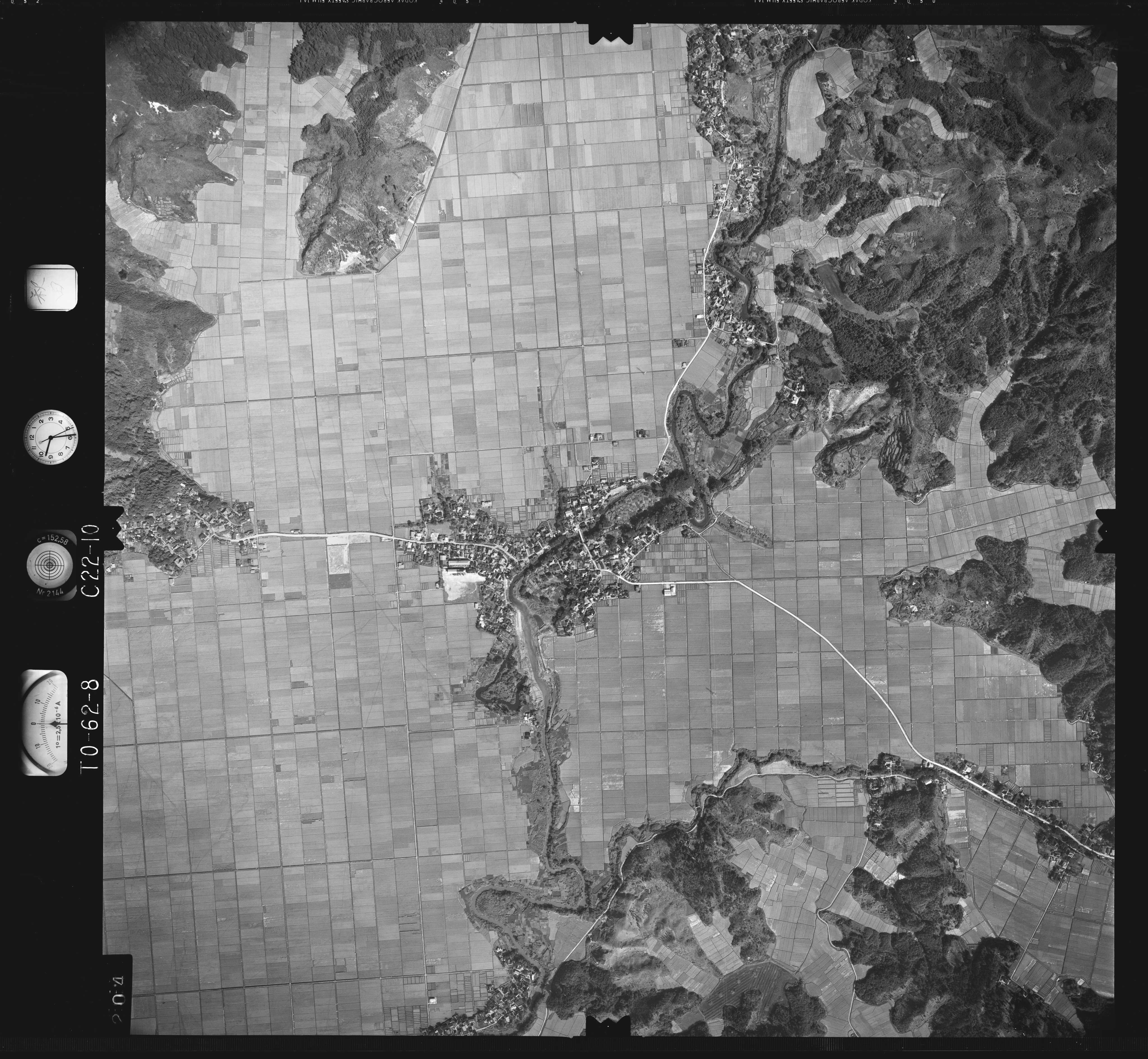
Hiroomote in 1962

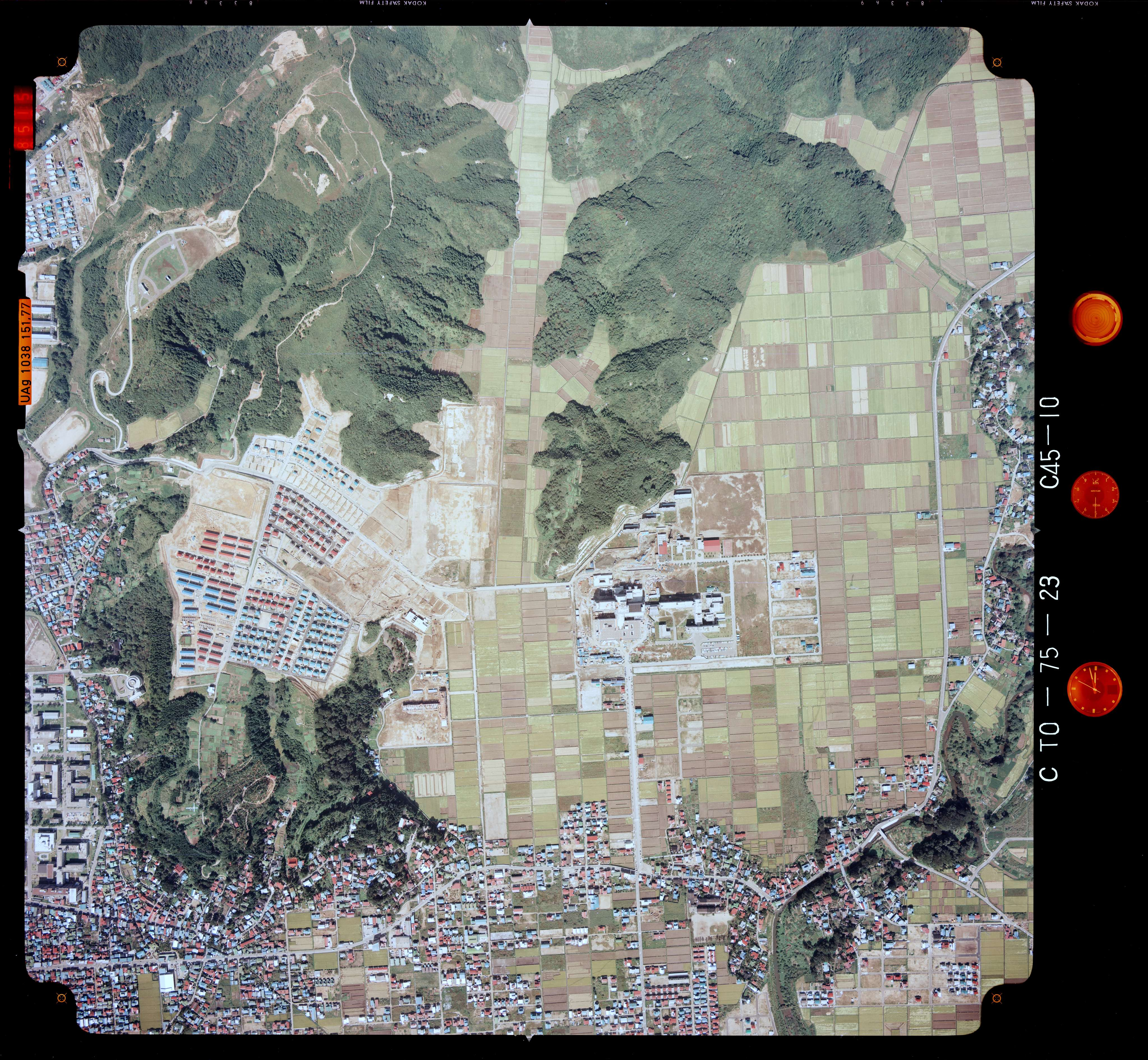
Hiroomote in 1975

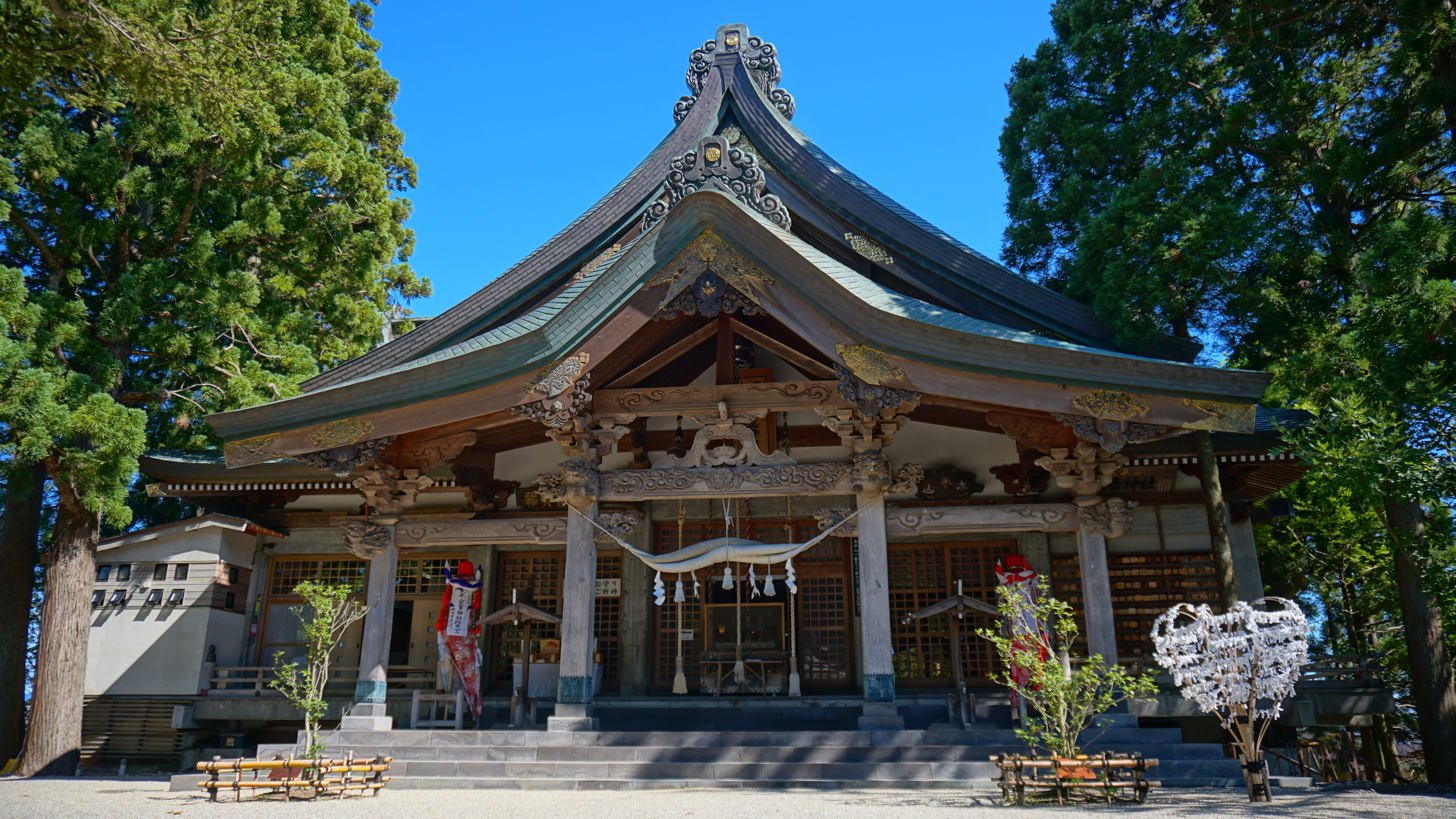
Miyoshi Shrine

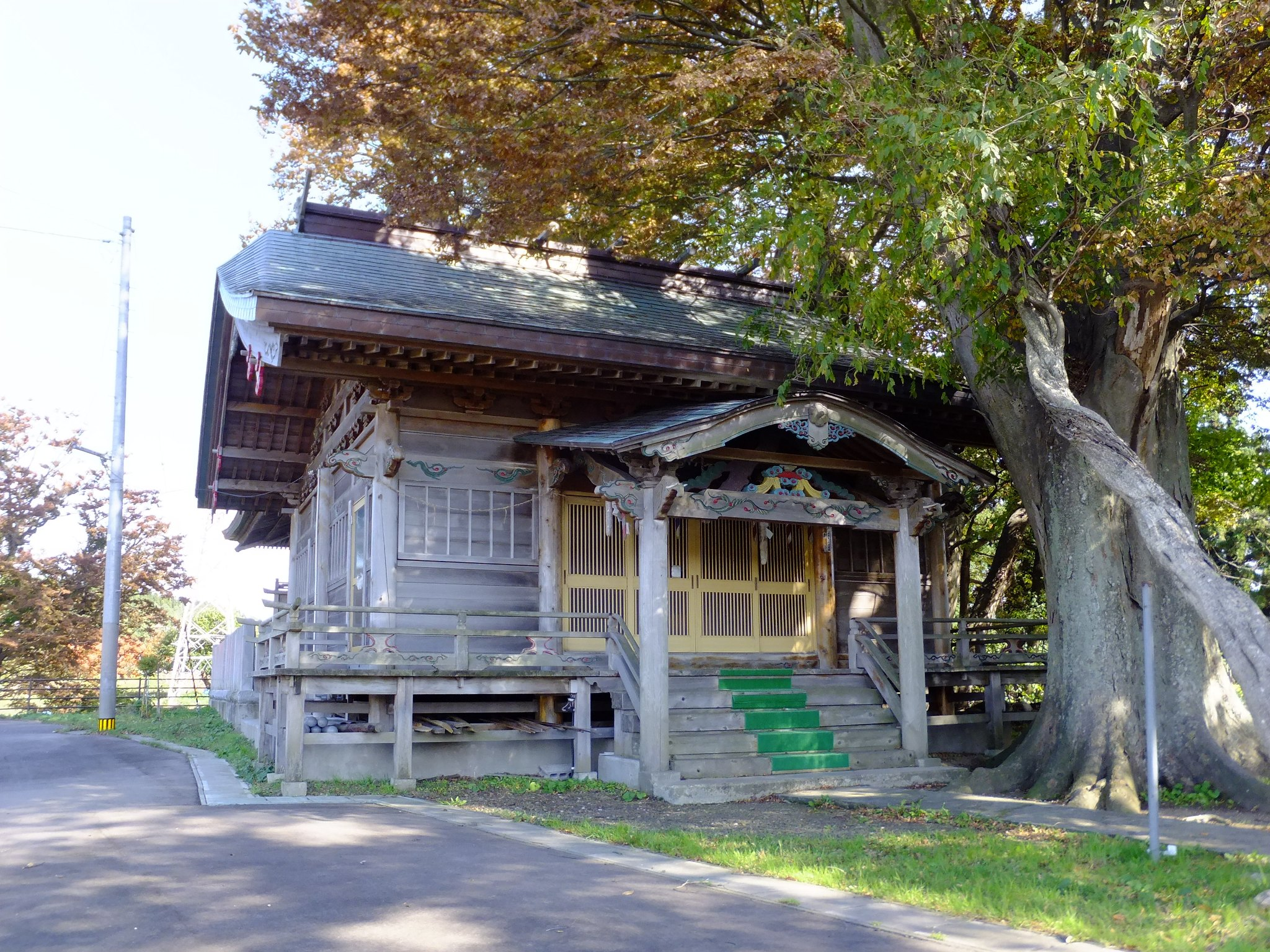
Isurugi Shrine

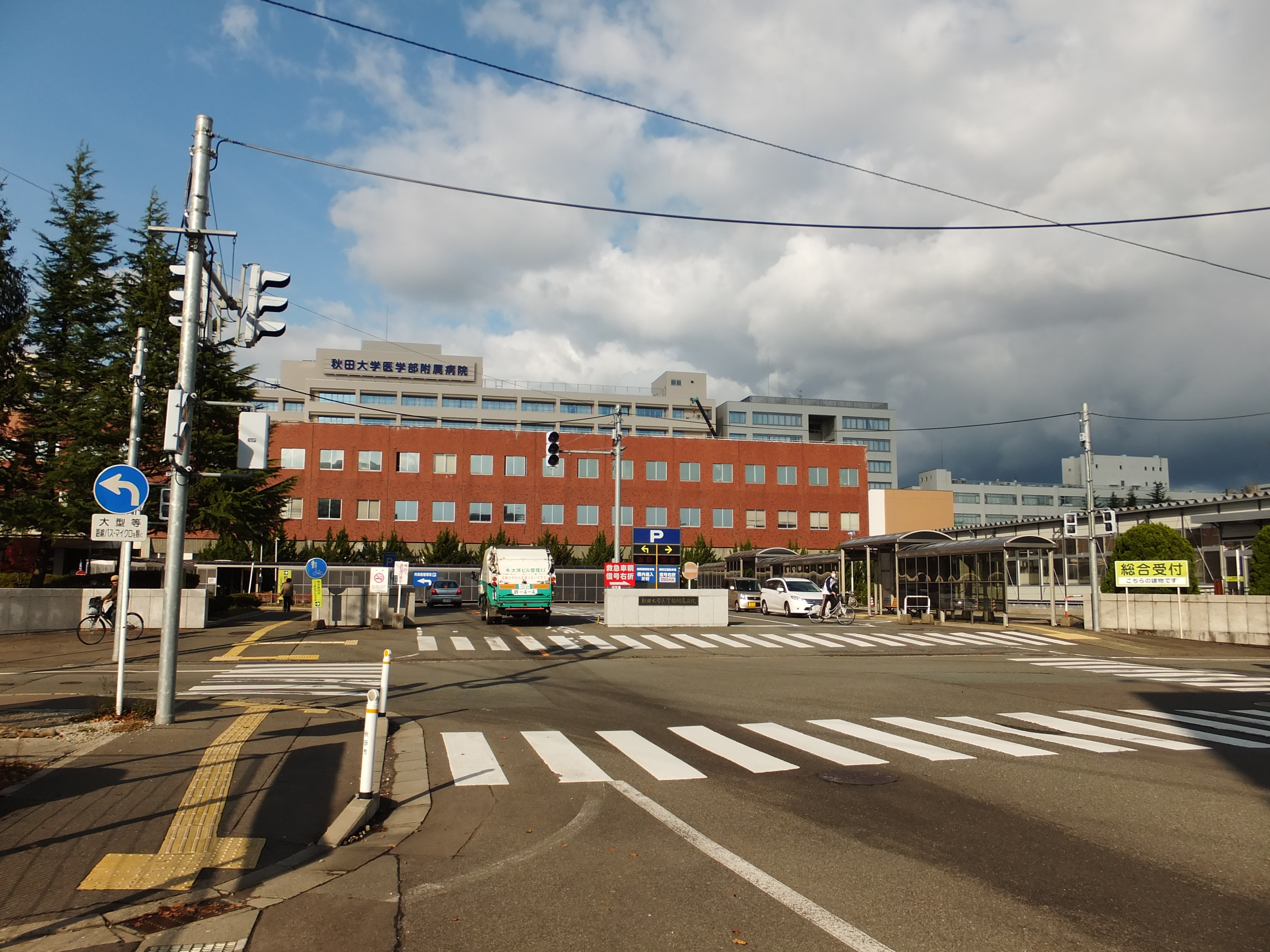
Akita University Hospital

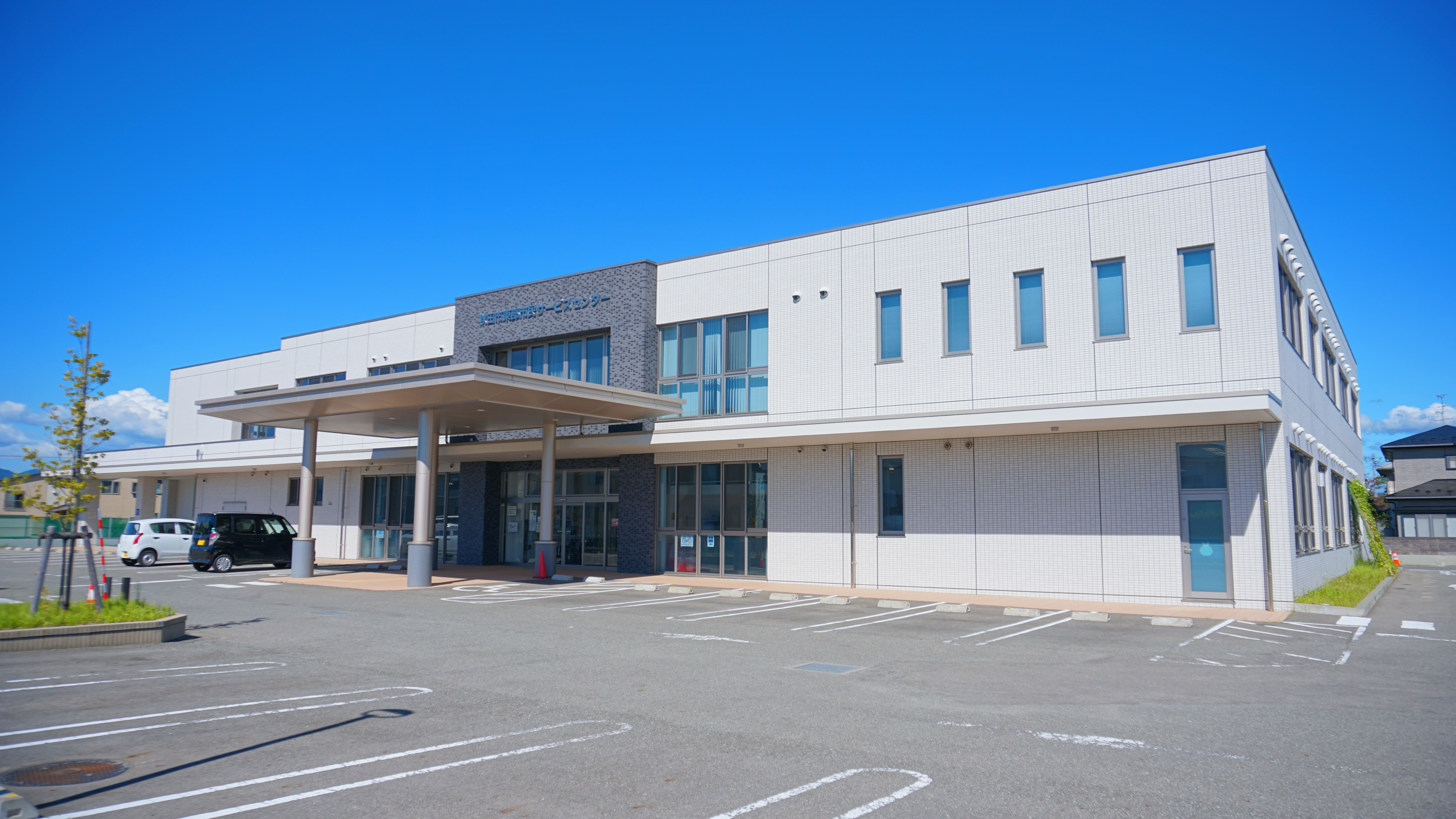
E-Pal

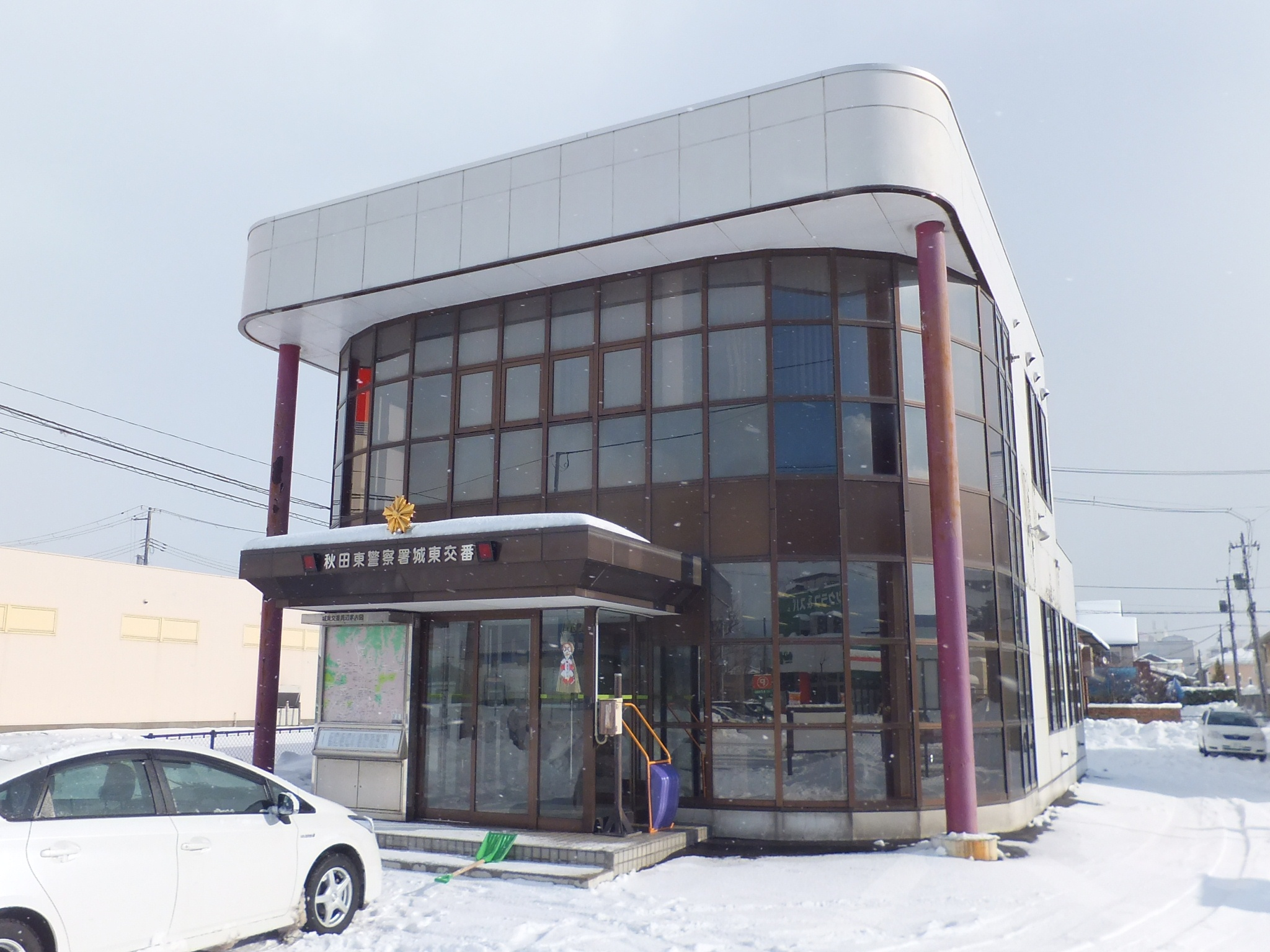
Joto Koban

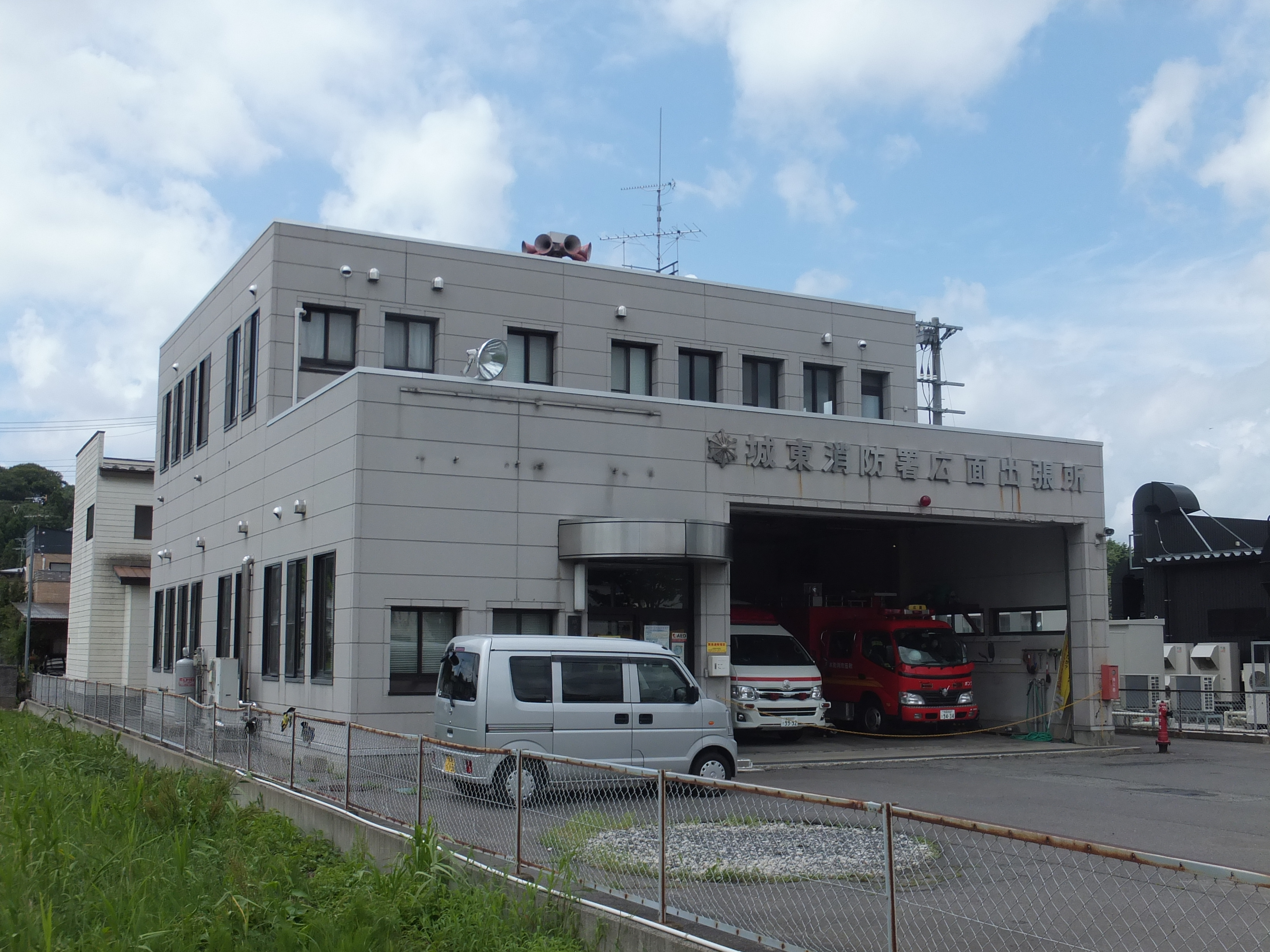
Joto Fire Station Hiroomote

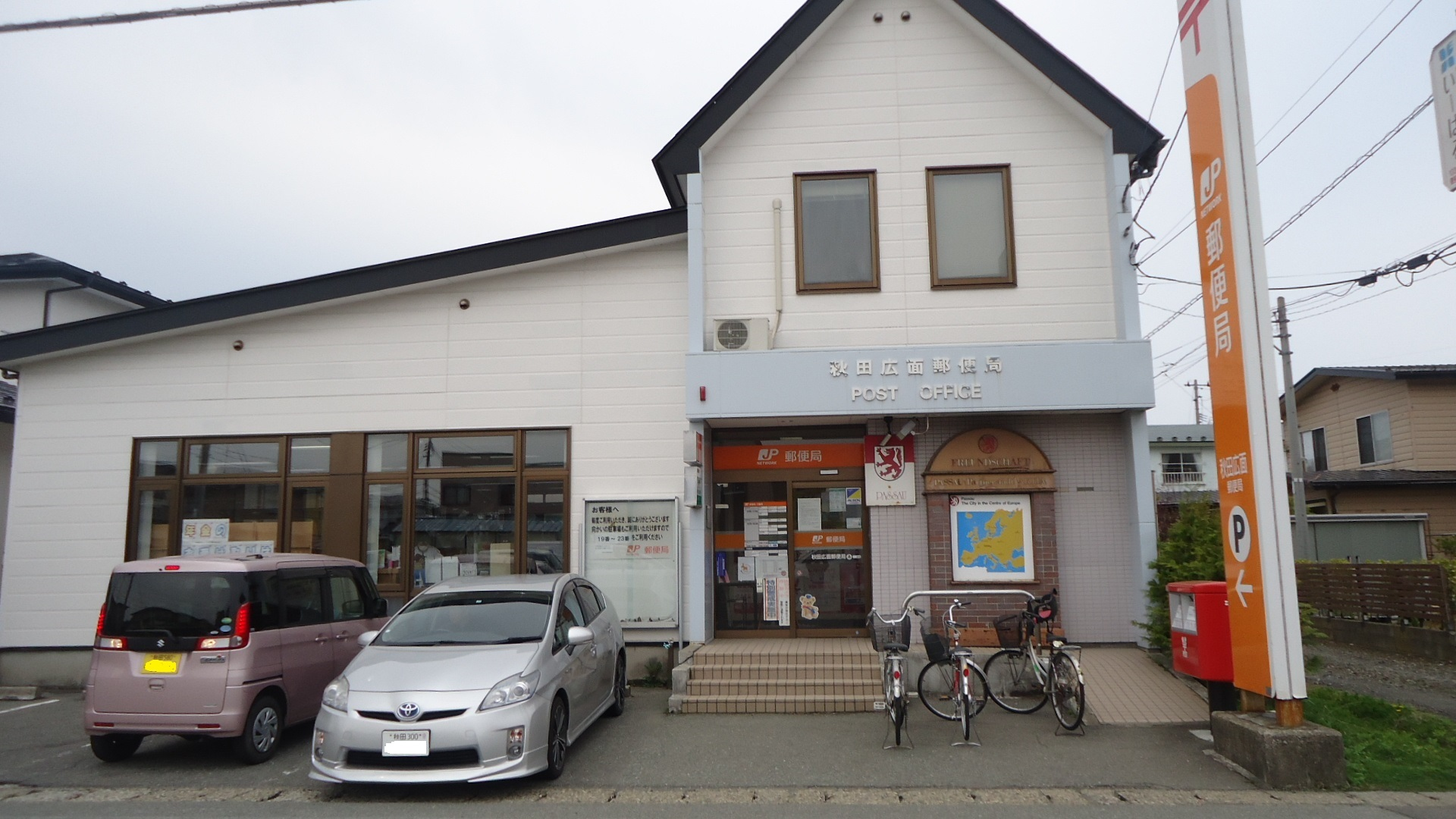
Hiroomote Post Office

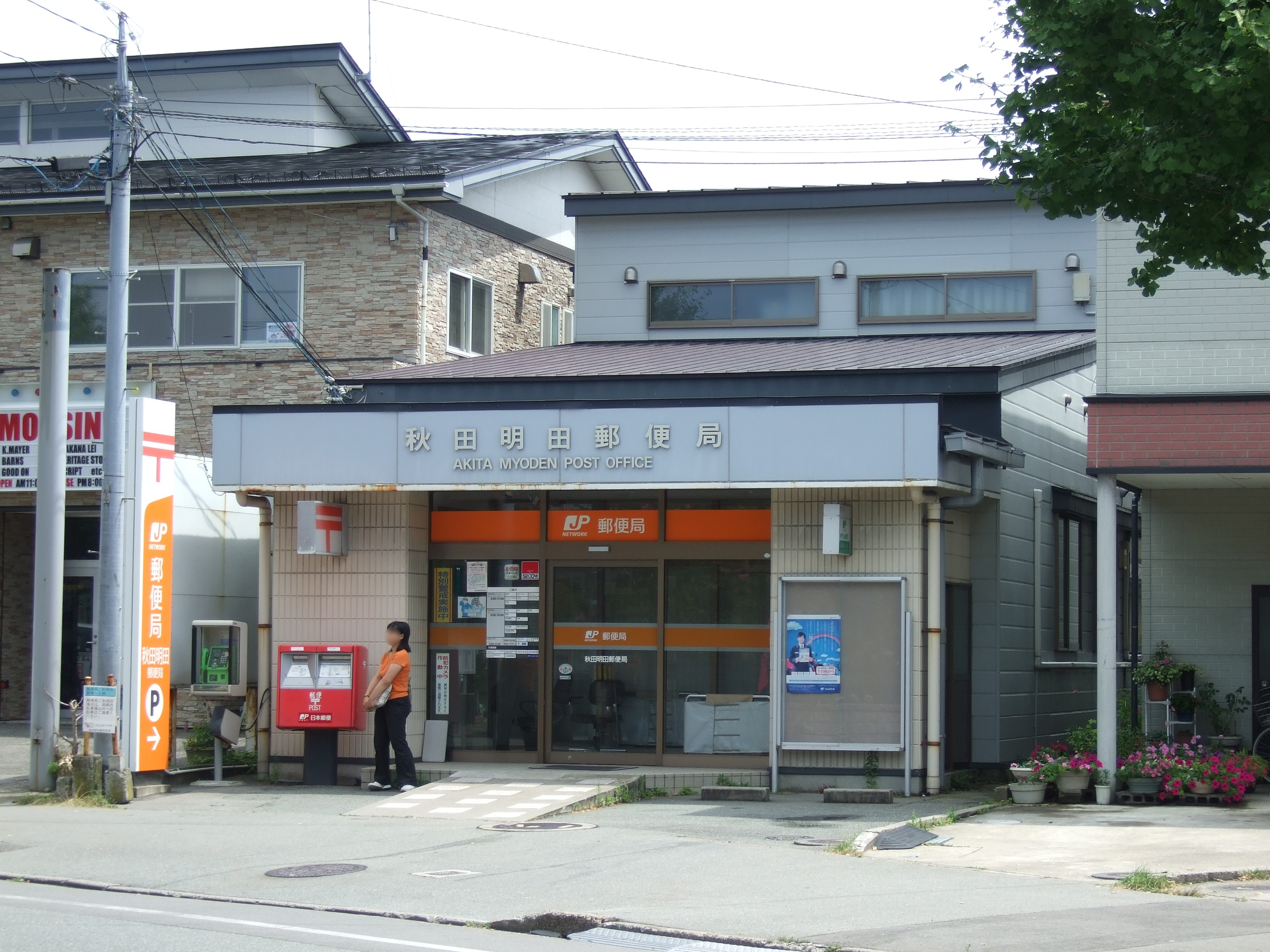
Myoden Post Office

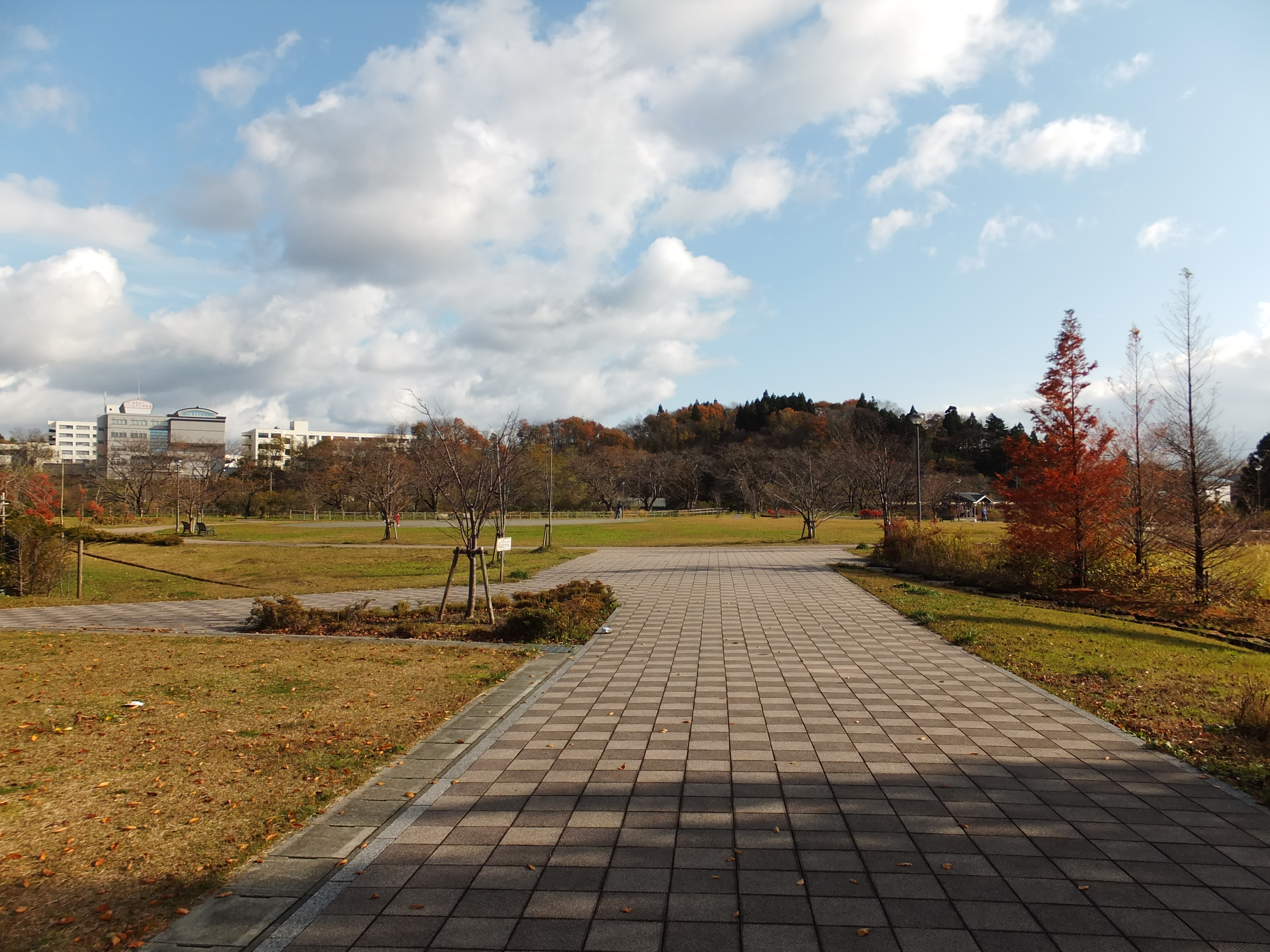
Hiroomote Kinrin Park

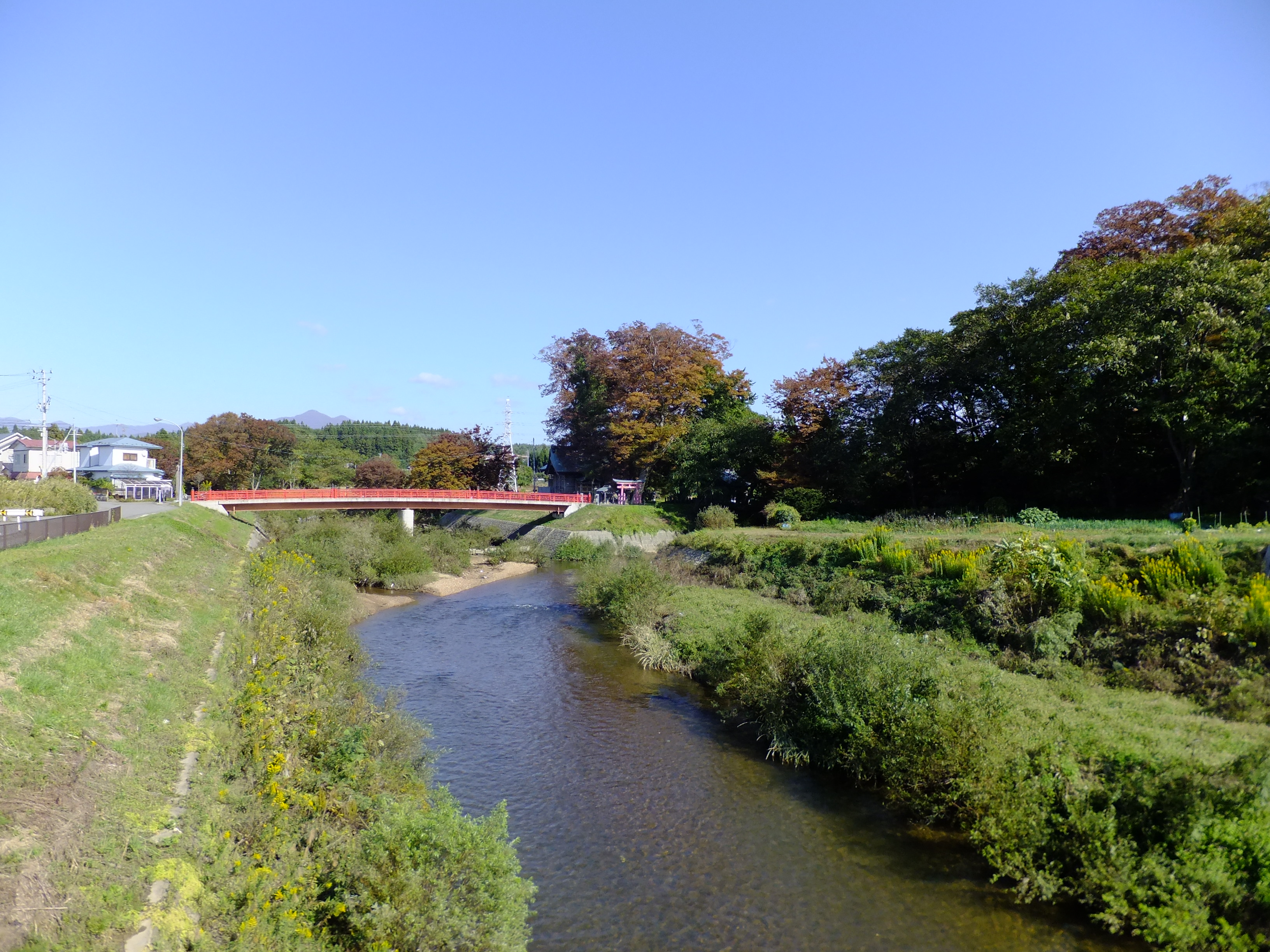
Taihei River

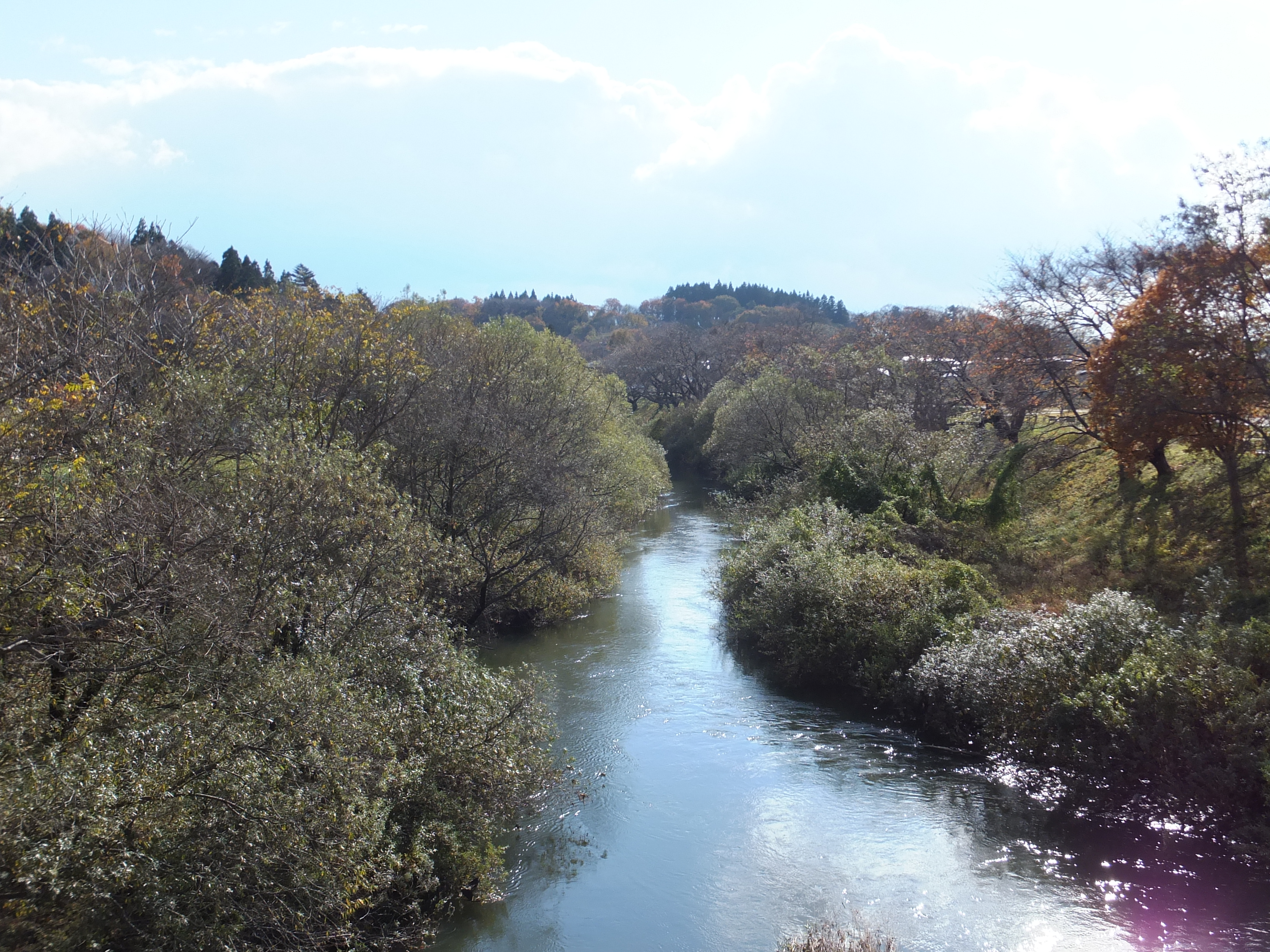
Taihei River

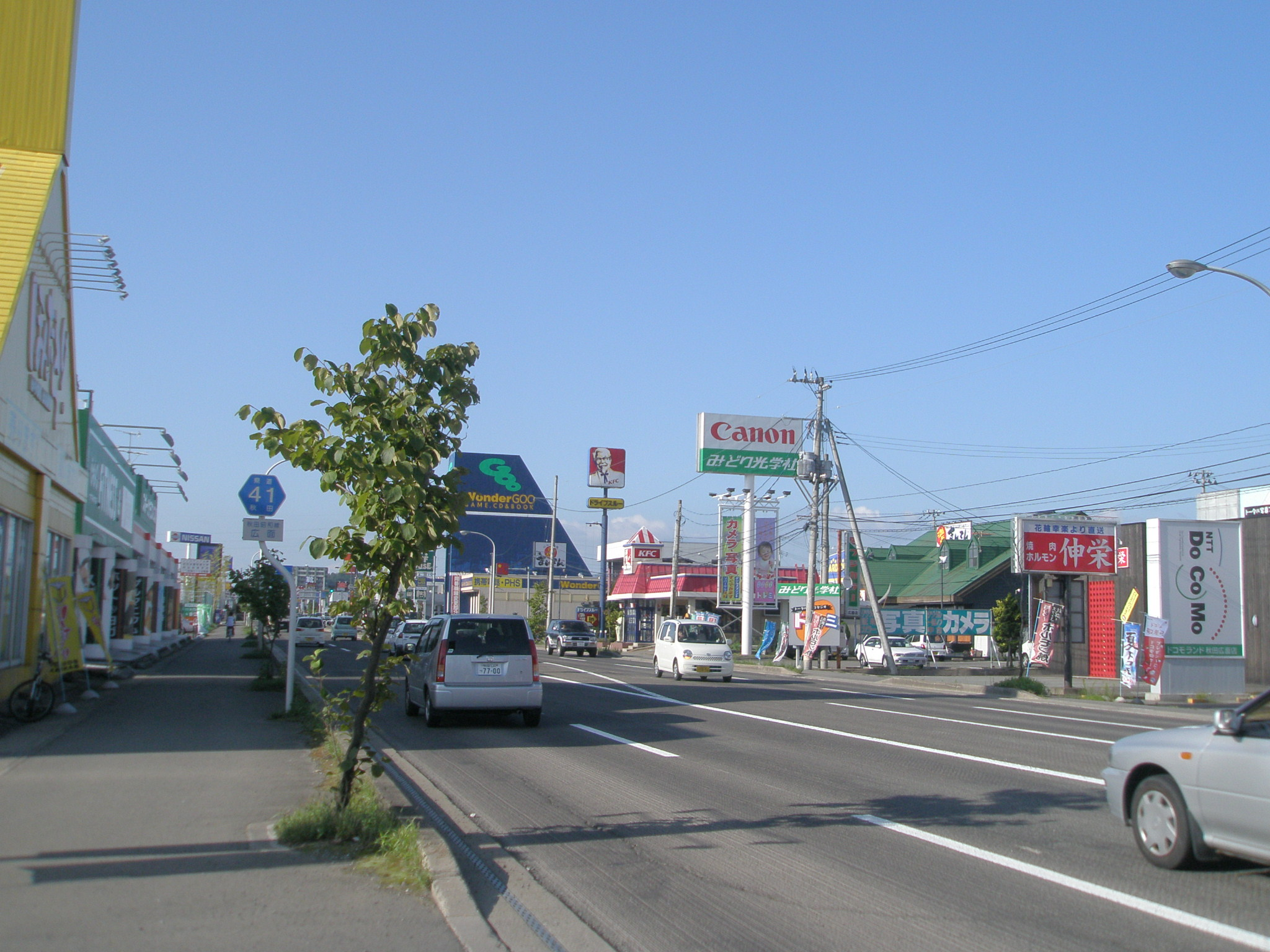
Prefectural Road 41

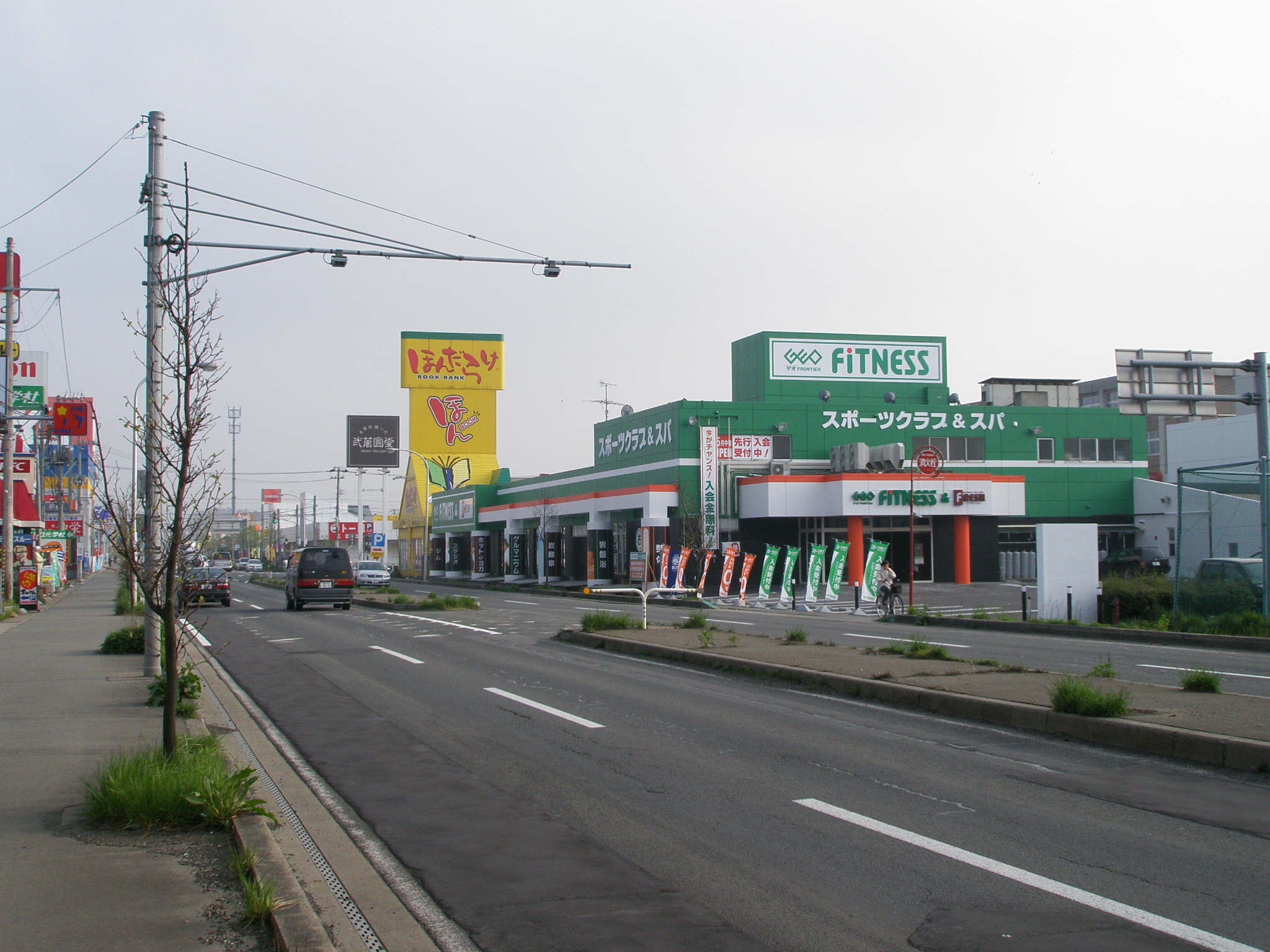
Prefectural Road 41

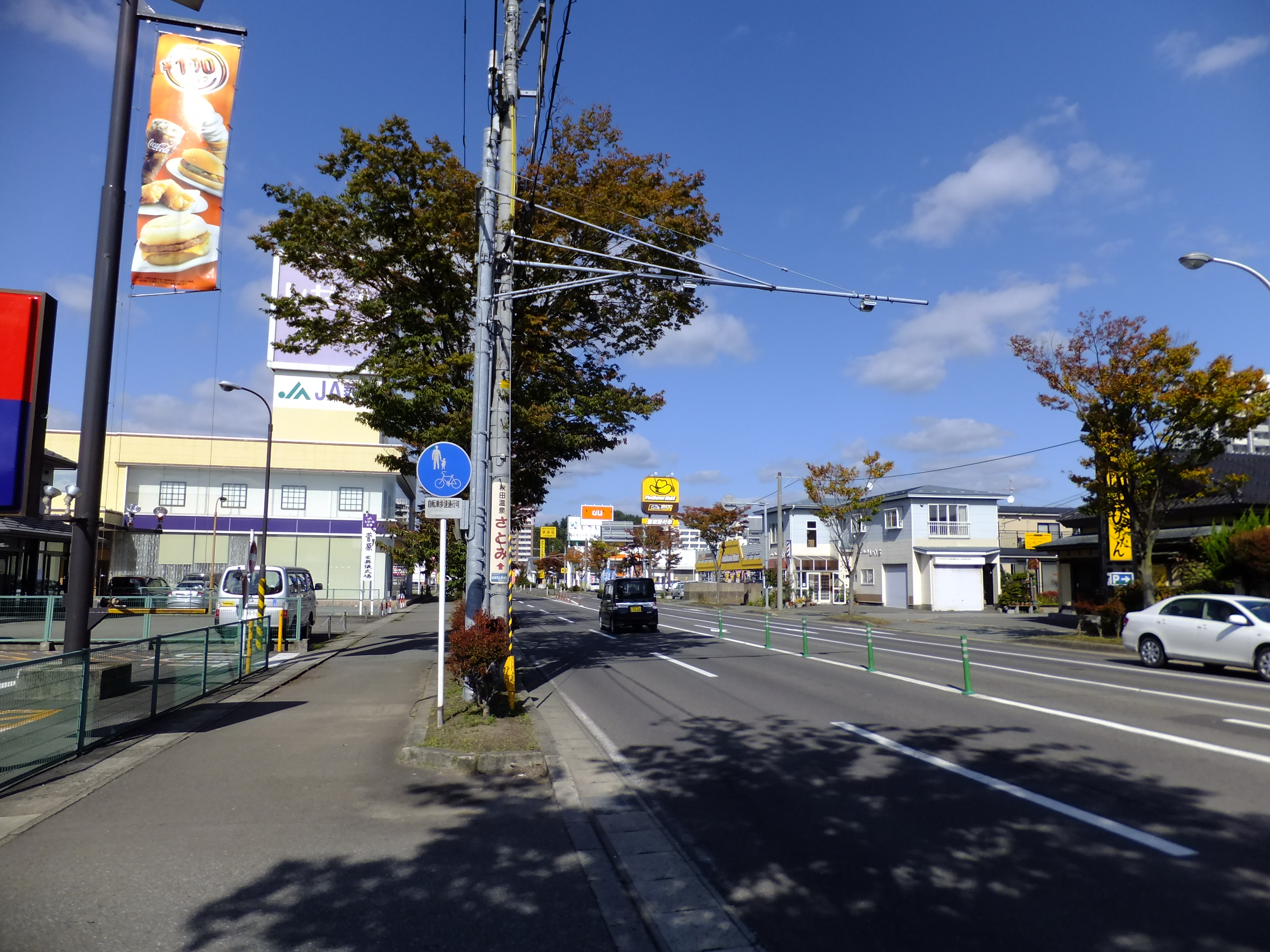
Prefectural Road 41

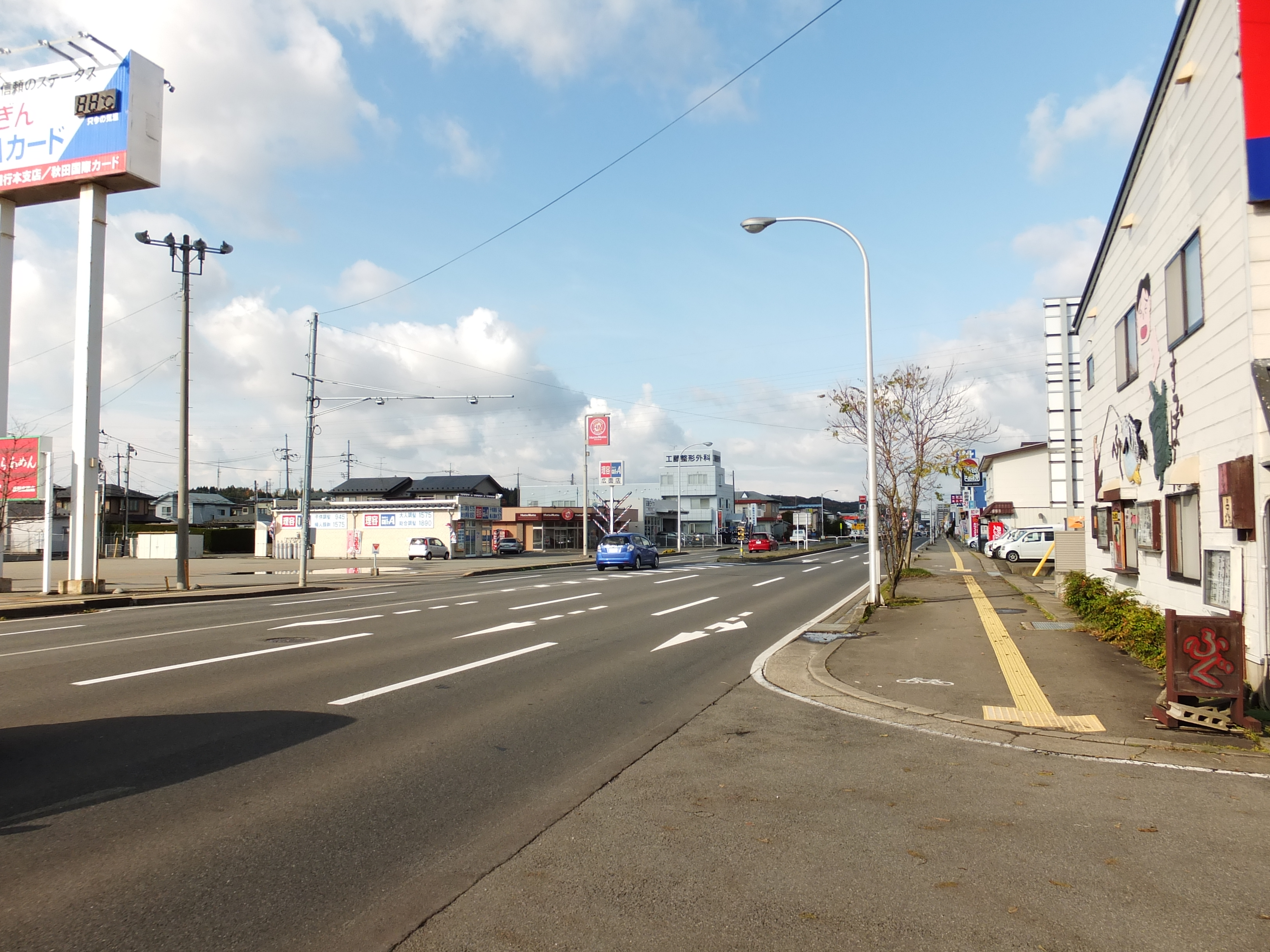
Prefectural Road 41

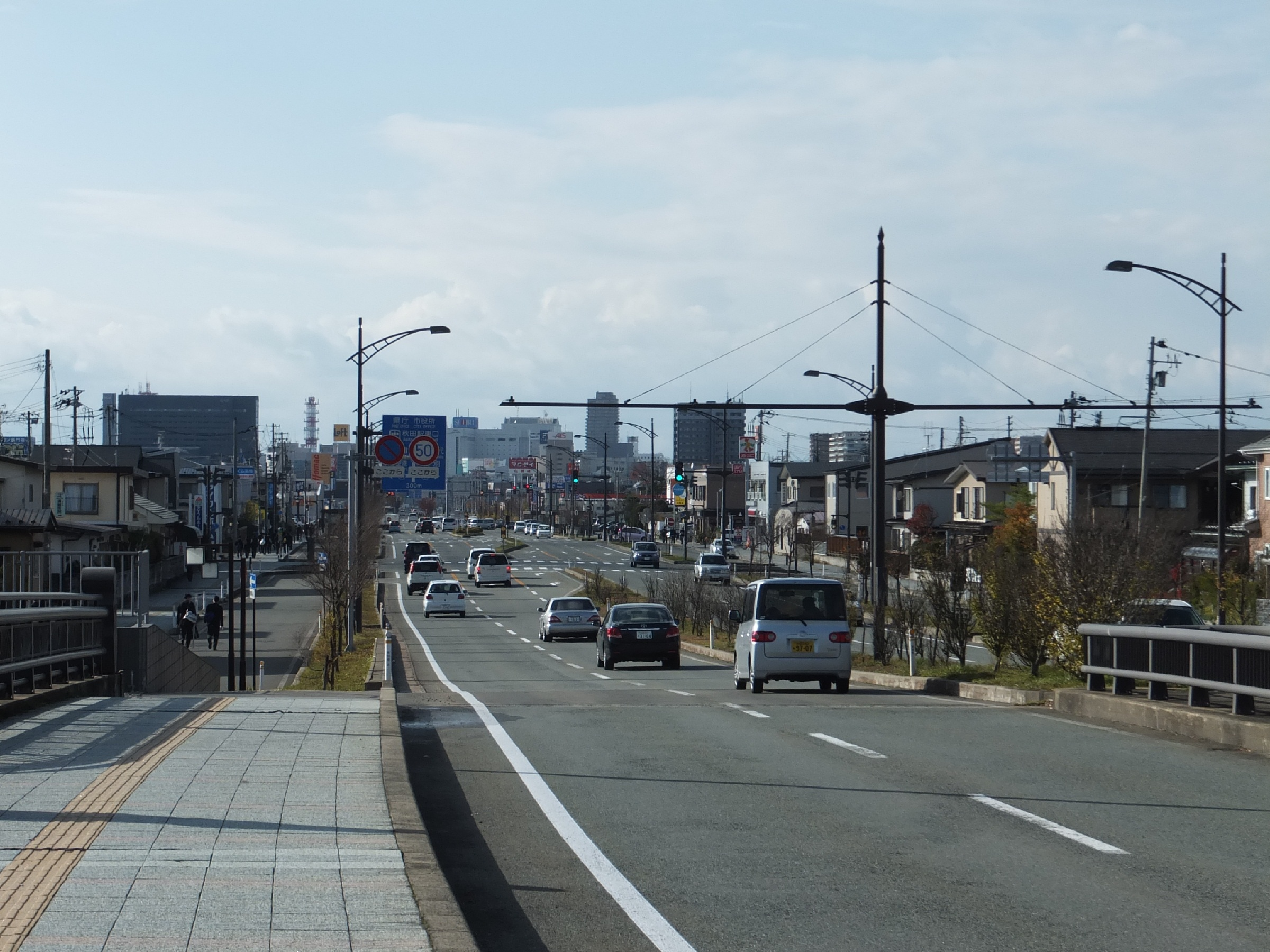
Prefectural Road 62
