= List of Japanese films of 1980 =

A list of films released in Japan in 1980 (see 1980 in film).

== Box-office ranking ==
Rank	Title	Director	Box office
1	Kagemusha	Akira Kurosawa	¥2.7 billion
2	Virus	Kinji Fukasaku	¥2.4 billion
3	The Battle of Port Arthur	Toshio Masuda	¥1.8 billion
4	Doraemon: Nobita's Dinosaur	Hiroshi Fukutomi	¥1.55 billion
5	Be Forever Yamato	Toshio Masuda	¥1.35 billion

== List of films ==
Japanese films released in 1980
Title	Director	Cast	Genre	Notes
The Beast to Die			—N/a	
Cyborg 009: Legend of the Super Galaxy	Masayuki Akehi	Fuyumi Shiraishi	—N/a	
Denziman Movie			—N/a	
Disciples of Hippocrates	Kazuki Ōmori	Masato Furuoya, Ran Ito, Akira Emoto	—N/a	
Doraemon: Nobita's Dinosaur	Hiroshi Fukutomi	Nobuyo Ōyama		Animated feature
Dreamy Fifteen	Shinji Sōmai	Shingo Tsurumi, Toshinori Omi, Mariko Ishihara	—N/a	
Foster Daddy, Tora!	Yoji Yamada	Kiyoshi Atsumi	—N/a	
Gamera: Super Monster	Noriaki Yuasa	Mach Fumiake	—N/a	
Kagemusha	Akira Kurosawa	Tatsuya Nakadai, Tsutomu Yamazaki, Kenichi Hagiwara	Jidai-geki	
Kaigende no yoru	Kosaku Yamashita	Kōji Tsuruta, Takao Ito, Kanako Higuchi	—N/a	
Kamen Rider: Eight Rider vs. Galaxy King			—N/a	
Magnitude 7.9	Kenjiro Omori	Hiroshi Katsuno, Toshiyuki Nagashima, Yumi Takigawa	Disaster film	
Makoto-chan	Tsutomu Shibayama		—N/a	Animated feature
Ningyo ga kureta Sakuragai	Sakuro Yasu	Sumiko Kakizaki, Tsunehiro Arai, Kyoko Iwaki	—N/a	
Ienakiko	Toru Izusaki		—N/a	Animated feature
An Ocean to Cross	Kei Kumai	Katsuo Nakmura, Masaaki Daimon, Mitsuo Hamada	—N/a	
The Old Capital	Kon Ichikawa	Momoe Yamaguchi, Tomokazu Miura	—N/a	
Onna no Hosomichi: Nureta Kaikyo	Kazunari Takeda	Miyako Yamaguchi, Megumi Ogawa, Kan Mikami	Erotic drama	
Panda no sekai–Fanfan to nakama tachi	Shiro Nanmura		Documentary	
Pinocchio's Christmas	Jules Bass, Arthur Rankin, Jr.	Todd Porter, George S. Irving, Alan King, Bob McFadden, Allen Swift, Paul Frees	Animated	
Rape Hunter Nerawareta Onna				
The Return of the King	Jules Bass, Arthur Rankin Jr.	Orson Bean, John Huston, William Conrad, Roddy McDowall, Theodore Bikel	Animated musical fantasy	
Shōgun	Jerry London	Richard Chamberlain, Toshiro Mifune, Yoko Shimada	—N/a	American-Japanese co-production
Space Firebird 2772	Kazuko Nakamura, Noburo Ishiguro		—N/a	Animated feature
Tora's Tropical Fever	Yoji Yamada	Kiyoshi Atsumi	Comedy	
Twelve Months	Kimio Yabuki	Shinobu Otake, Ai Kanzaki, Tokuko Sugiyama	Animation	
Virus	Kinji Fukasaku	Masao Kusakari, Sonny Chiba	Drama	
Yūgure made	Kazuo Kuroki	Kaori Momoi, Juzo Itami, Mariko Kaga	—N/a	
Zigeunerweisen	Seijun Suzuki	Toshiya Fujita, Yoshio Harada	—N/a	

== See also ==
- 1980 in Japan
- 1980 in Japanese television
