= 1980 in Japan =

- Decades: 1960s; 1970s; 1980s; 1990s; 2000s
- See also: Other events of 1980; History of Japan • Timeline • Years

Events in the year 1980 in Japan. It corresponds to Shōwa 55 (昭和55年) in the Japanese calendar.

== Incumbents ==
- Emperor: Hirohito (Emperor Shōwa)
- Prime Minister:
  - Masayoshi Ōhira (L–Kagawa), until June 12
  - Zenkō Suzuki (L–Iwate), from July 17
- Chief Cabinet Secretary and acting Prime Minister from June 12 to July 17: Masayoshi Itō (L–Fukushima) until July 17, Kiichi Miyazawa (L–Hiroshima)
- Chief Justice of the Supreme Court: Takaaki Hattori
- President of the House of Representatives: Hirokichi Nadao (L–Hiroshima) until May 19, Hajime Fukuda (L–Fukui) from July 17
- President of the House of Councillors: Ken Yasui (L–Tokyo) until July 7, Masatoshi Tokunaga (L–national) from July 17
- Diet sessions: 91st (regular session opened in December 1979, to May 19), 92nd (special, July 17 to July 26), 93rd (extraordinary, September 29 to November 29), 94th (regular, December 22 to 1981, June 6)

=== Governors ===
- Aichi Prefecture: Yoshiaki Nakaya
- Akita Prefecture: Kikuji Sasaki
- Aomori Prefecture: Masaya Kitamura
- Chiba Prefecture: Kiichi Kawakami
- Ehime Prefecture: Haruki Shiraishi
- Fukui Prefecture: Heidayū Nakagawa
- Fukuoka Prefecture: Hikaru Kamei
- Fukushima Prefecture: Isao Matsudaira
- Gifu Prefecture: Yosuke Uematsu
- Gunma Prefecture: Ichiro Shimizu
- Hiroshima Prefecture: Hiroshi Miyazawa
- Hokkaido: Naohiro Dōgakinai
- Hyogo Prefecture: Tokitada Sakai
- Ibaraki Prefecture: Fujio Takeuchi
- Ishikawa Prefecture: Yōichi Nakanishi
- Iwate Prefecture: Tadashi Nakamura
- Kagawa Prefecture: Tadao Maekawa
- Kagoshima Prefecture: Kaname Kamada
- Kanagawa Prefecture: Kazuji Nagasu
- Kochi Prefecture: Chikara Nakauchi
- Kumamoto Prefecture: Issei Sawada
- Kyoto Prefecture: Yukio Hayashida
- Mie Prefecture: Ryōzō Tagawa
- Miyagi Prefecture: Sōichirō Yamamoto
- Miyazaki Prefecture: Suketaka Matsukata
- Nagano Prefecture: Gon'ichirō Nishizawa (until 11 September); Gorō Yoshimura (starting 26 October)
- Nagasaki Prefecture: Kan'ichi Kubo
- Nara Prefecture: Ryozo Okuda (until 30 September); Shigekiyo Ueda (starting 26 October)
- Niigata Prefecture: Takeo Kimi
- Oita Prefecture: Morihiko Hiramatsu
- Okayama Prefecture: Shiro Nagano
- Okinawa Prefecture: Junji Nishime
- Osaka Prefecture: Sakae Kishi
- Saga Prefecture: Kumao Katsuki
- Saitama Prefecture: Yawara Hata
- Shiga Prefecture: Masayoshi Takemura
- Shiname Prefecture: Seiji Tsunematsu
- Shizuoka Prefecture: Keizaburō Yamamoto
- Tochigi Prefecture: Yuzuru Funada
- Tokushima Prefecture: Yasunobu Takeichi
- Tokyo: Shun'ichi Suzuki
- Tottori Prefecture: Kōzō Hirabayashi
- Toyama Prefecture: Kokichi Nakada (until 18 September); Yutaka Nakaoki (starting 8 November)
- Wakayama Prefecture: Shirō Kariya
- Yamagata Prefecture: Seiichirō Itagaki
- Yamaguchi Prefecture: Toru Hirai
- Yamanashi Prefecture: Kōmei Mochizuki

== Events ==
- January 6 – According to Japan National Police Agency official confirmed report, Hayakawa wire bridge collapse by human stampede in Saito, Miyazaki Prefecture, seven persons were crush to death, 15 persons were wounded.
- January 16 – Paul McCartney is arrested at Narita airport for possession of drugs.
- April Unknown date – Fancl Cosmetics, as predecessor of FANCL was founded.
- April 24 – Nintendo releases the first portable game console, the Game & Watch.
- June 22
  - 1980 Japanese general election
  - 1980 Japanese House of Councillors election
- August 14 – A rock fall hit mountaineers in Mount Fuji, Yamanashi Prefecture, according to official results report, 12 fatalities, with 29 injured.
- August 16 – A gas explosion occurs in the underground shopping area of Shizuoka Station, killing or injuring 200.
- August 19 – 1980 Shinjuku bus fire, according to official confirmed report, 6 person fatalities with 15 were wounded.
- November 19 – A fire at the Kawaji Prince Hotel in Fujihara, Tochigi Prefecture kills 40.

== Popular culture ==
=== Arts and entertainment ===
In film, Zigeunerweisen by Seijun Suzuki won the Best film award at the Japan Academy Prize and the Yokohama Film Festival, Kagemusha by Akira Kurosawa won Best film at the Hochi Film Awards, the Blue Ribbon Awards and the Mainichi Film Award. For a list of Japanese films released in 1980 see Japanese films of 1980.

In manga, the winners of the Shogakukan Manga Award were Hakatakko Junjō and Gangaragan by Hōsei Hasegawa and Chie the Brat by Etsumi Haruki (general) and Urusei Yatsura by Rumiko Takahashi (shōnen or shōjo). Susano Oh by Go Nagai (shōnen) and Lemon Report by Mayumi Yoshida (shōjo) won the Kodansha Manga Award. For a list of manga released in 1980 see Category:1980 manga.

In music, hit singles included Aoi Sangoshou by Seiko Matsuda, and "Ihojin" by Saki Kubota. Momoe Yamaguchi retired. The 31st Kōhaku Uta Gassen was won by the Red Team (women). Hiroshi Itsuki won the FNS Music Festival. For other music in 1980, see 1980 in Japanese music.

In television, see: 1980 in Japanese television.

Japan hosted the Miss International 1980 beauty pageant, won by Costa Rican Lorna Chávez.

=== Sports ===
In football (soccer) Yanmar Diesel won the Japan Soccer League. For the champions of the regional leagues see: 1980 Japanese Regional Leagues. For more see: 1980 in Japanese football.

At the Winter Olympics Japan won a silver medal.

== Births ==
=== January–June ===
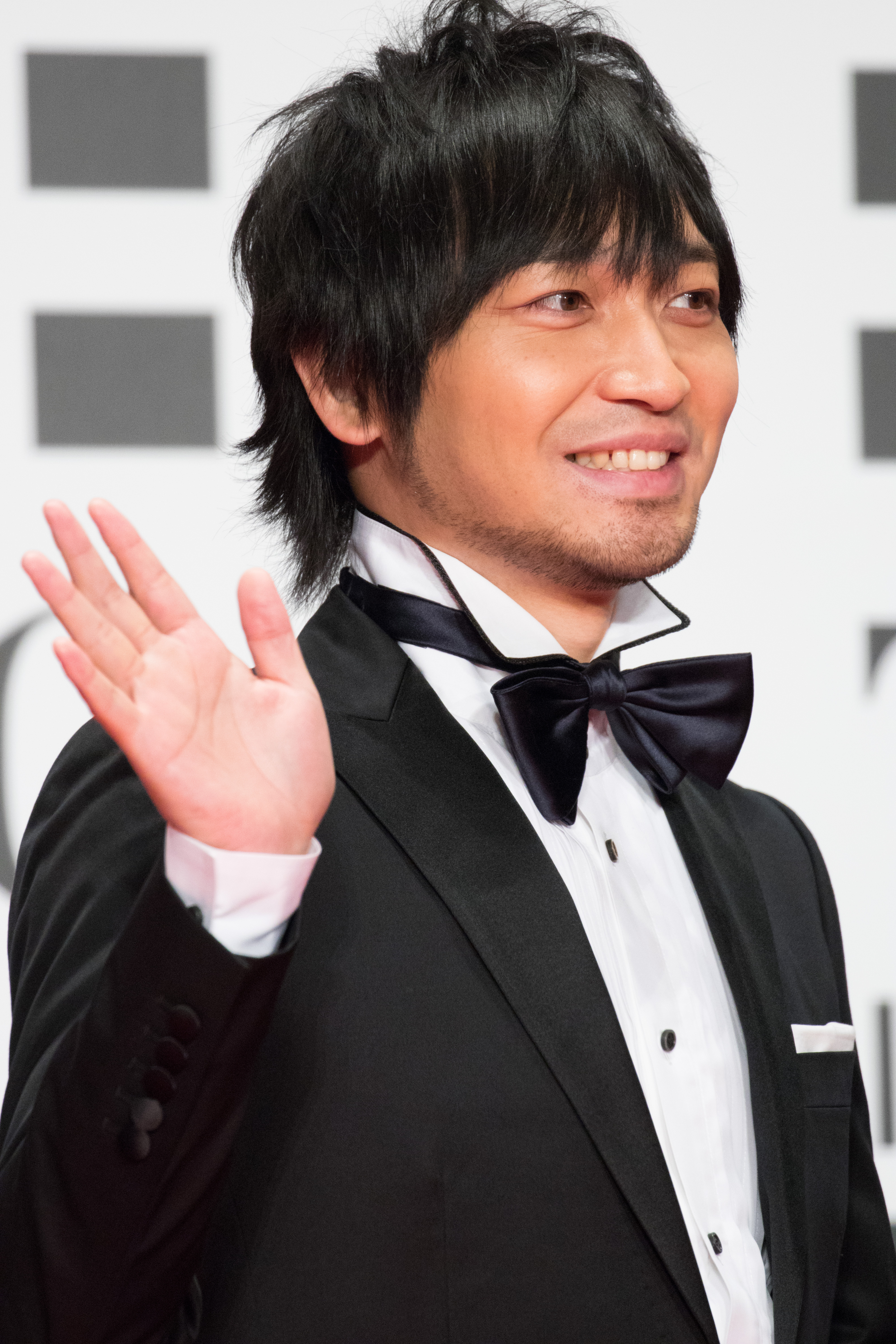
Yuichi Nakamura

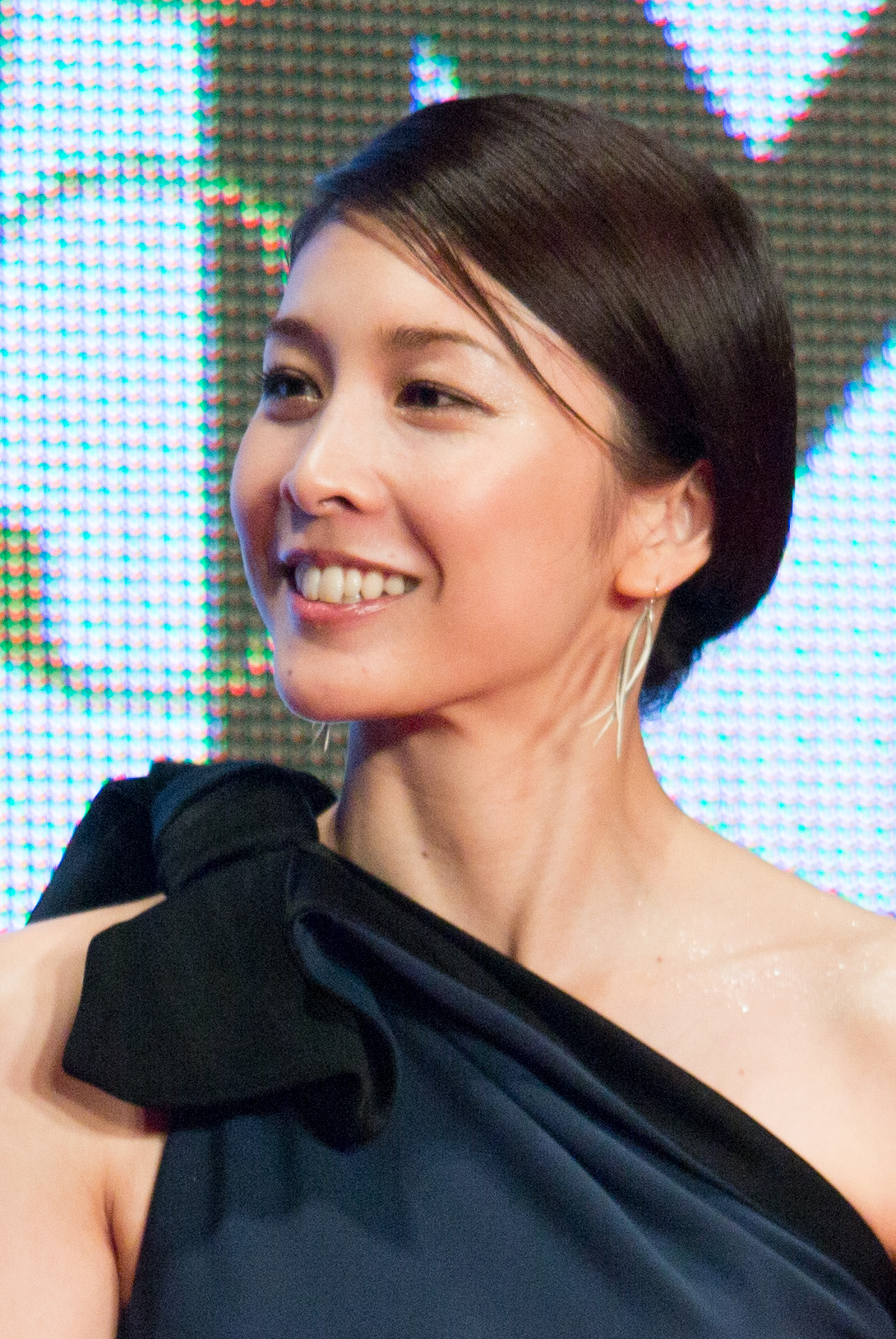
Yūko Takeuchi

- January 6: Hiromi Oshima, model
- January 13: Akira Kaji, football player
- January 14:
  - Hiroshi Tamaki, actor, model and singer
  - Sosuke Sumitani, announcer
  - Yūko Kaida, voice actress
- January 21: Nana Mizuki, voice actress and singer
- January 23: Nana Natsume, AV idol and celebrity
- January 26: Sanae Kobayashi, voice actress and singer
- February 4: Kenta Kiritani, actor and singer
- February 6: Mamiko Noto, voice actress and singer
- February 17: Aya Endō, voice actress
- February 20: Yuichi Nakamura, voice actor
- February 21: Kayoko Shibata, actress
- March 8: Kazuyuki Okitsu, voice actor
- March 31: Maaya Sakamoto, voice actress and singer
- April 1: Yūko Takeuchi, actress (d. 2020)
- April 2: Yuya Shirai, mixed martial artist
- April 3: Yūko Ishibashi, singer
- April 7: Mr. C.B., thoroughbred racehorse (d. 2002)
- April 14: Ayumi Ito, actress
- April 15: Futoshi Uehara, musician
- April 21: Hiro Shimono, voice actor
- April 25: Juri Miyazawa, actress and gravure idol
- May 9: Norihiro Nishi, footballer
- May 10: Mayumi Kawasaki, race walker
- May 20: Chinatsu Mori, shot putter (d. 2006)
- May 22: Rena Tanaka, actress
- May 31:
  - Mika Katsumura, actress
  - Akitoshi Tamura, mixed martial artist
- June 1: Mitsuru Chiyotanda, football player
- June 2: Shingo Suetsugu, sprinter
- June 3: Keiji Suzuki, judoka
- June 9: Kana Ueda, voice actress
- June 17: Kimeru, singer
- June 25: Nozomi Takeuchi, actress
- June 27: Takahiro Futagawa, football player

=== July –December ===
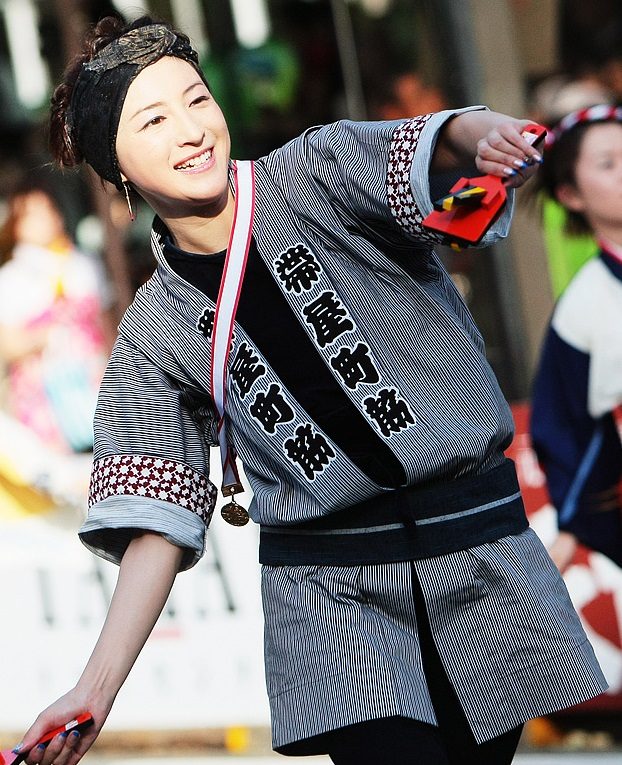
Ryōko Hirosue

- July 15
  - Masayuki Hirahara, pianist and composer
  - BxB Hulk, professional wrestler
- July 17: Masato Yoshino, professional wrestler
- July 18: Ryōko Hirosue, actress and pop star
- July 22: Hisashi Mizutori, gymnast
- July 28: Harumi Nemoto, gravure idol
- July 30: Ayako Uehara, classical pianist
- July 31: Rina Aiuchi, singer
- August 7: Seiichiro Maki, footballer
- August 14: Yusuke Kawaguchi, mixed martial artist
- August 29: Daisuke Saito, football player
- September 4: Hitomi Shimatani, pop singer
- September 8: Mai Kadowaki, voice actress
- September 13: Daisuke Matsuzaka, baseball player
- September 19: Jun Natsukawa, gravure idol
- September 27: Asashōryū Akinori, sumo wrestler.
- September 30: Arisa Ogasawara, voice actress
- October 11: Tomokazu Sugita, voice actor
- October 13: Salyu, singer
- October 16: Takehito Shigehara, football player
- October 30: Chihiro Onitsuka, singer-songwriter
- October 31: Kengo Nakamura, footballer
- November 4: Kanako Naito, volleyball player (d. 2019)
- November 18: Junichi Okada, singer, actor
- November 21: Hiroyuki Tomita, gymnast
- November 26: Satoshi Ohno, singer, actor
- December 5: Shizuka Itō, voice actress
- December 6: Kei Yasuda, singer, musician and actress
- December 13: Satoshi Tsumabuki, actor
- December 16: Daito Takahashi, Nordic combined skier
- December 23: Ayako Ito, announcer

== Deaths ==
- January 4: Shohachi Ishii, wrestler
- January 23: Shōjirō Iida, general
- February 14: Kitsuju Ayabe, general
- February 22: Sadaaki Akamatsu, officer and ace fighter pilot in the Imperial Japanese Navy
- February 27: Shin'ichi Hisamatsu, philosopher
- March 16: Susumu Kimura, admiral in the Imperial Japanese Navy
- May 8: Chieko Higashiyama, film actress (b. 1890)
- May 21: Hiroshi Inagaki, filmmaker
- June 12: Masayoshi Ōhira, Prime Minister (died in office) (b. 1910)
- October 10: Tameichi Hara, Imperial Japanese naval commander
- October 21: Kanjūrō Arashi, actor
- November 2: Yamakawa Kikue, activist, writer, socialist, and feminist (b. 1890)
- November 30: Mieko Fukui, basketball player (b. 1956)
- December 28: Nobuzo Tohmatsu, admiral in the Imperial Japanese Navy

== See also ==
- 1980 in Japanese television
- List of Japanese films of 1980
