= 1980 in Japanese television =

List of years in Japanese television
- … 1970; 1971; 1972; 1973; 1974; 1975; 1976; 1977; 1978; 1979; 1980; 1981; 1982; 1983; 1984; 1985; 1986; 1987; 1988; 1989; 1990 …
- Art; Archaeology; Architecture; Literature; Music; Philosophy; Science; +...

Events in 1980 in Japanese television.

== Channels ==
Launches:

- October 1 - TV Shinshu

== Debuts ==
- Denshi Sentai Denziman, tokusatsu (1980–1981)
- Fisherman Sanpei, anime (1980–1982)
- Kamen Rider Super-1, tokusatsu (1980–1981)
- The Littl' Bits, anime (1980)
- Invincible Robo Trider G7, anime (1980-1981)
- Miracle Girl (1980)
- Muteking, The Dashing Warrior, anime (1980–1981)
- Rescueman, anime (1980–1981)
- Shadow Warriors, drama (1980)
- Space Warrior Baldios (1980–1981)
- X-Bomber, tokusatsu (1980–1981)
- Ultraman 80, tokusatsu (1980–1981)

== Ongoing ==
- Music Fair, music (1964–present)
- Mito Kōmon, jidaigeki (1969–2011)
- Sazae-san, anime (1969–present)
- Ōedo Sōsamō, anime (1970–1984)
- Ōoka Echizen, jidaigeki (1970–1999)
- Star Tanjō!, talent (1971–1983)
- FNS Music Festival, music (1974–present)
- Ikkyū-san, anime (1975–1982)
- Panel Quiz Attack 25, game show (1975–present)
- Doraemon, anime (1979–2005)

== Endings ==
- Battle Fever J, tokusatsu (1979–1980)
- Kamen Rider (Skyrider), tokusatsu (1979–1980)
- Shadow Warriors, drama (1980)
- Supergirl, crime drama (1979–1980)
- The Ultraman, anime (1979–1980)
- Zenderman, anime (1979–1980)

== See also ==
- 1980 in anime
- 1980 in Japan
- List of Japanese films of 1980
