= 1986 in Japanese television =

List of years in Japanese television
- … 1976; 1977; 1978; 1979; 1980; 1981; 1982; 1983; 1984; 1985; 1986; 1987; 1988; 1989; 1990; 1991; 1992; 1993; 1994; 1995; 1996 …
- Art; Archaeology; Architecture; Literature; Music; Philosophy; Science; +...

Events in 1986 in Japanese television.

== Debuts ==
- Jikuu Senshi Spielban, tokusatsu (1986–1987)
- Choushinsei Flashman, tokusatsu (1986–1987)
- Hikari no Densetsu, anime (1986)
- Miyuki, drama (special) (1986)
- Saint Seiya, anime (1986–1989)
- Sukeban Deka 3: Shōjo Ninpōjō Denki, drama (1986–1987)
- Dragon Ball, anime (1986–1989)
- Maison Ikkoku, anime (1986-1988)
- Sekai Fushigi Hakken!, quiz show (1986–2024)

== Ongoing shows ==
- Music Fair, music (1964–present)
- Mito Kōmon, jidaigeki (1969-2011)
- Sazae-san, anime (1969–present)
- Ōoka Echizen, jidaigeki (1970-1999)
- FNS Music Festival, music (1974-present)
- Panel Quiz Attack 25, game show (1975–present)
- Doraemon, anime (1979-2005)
- High School! Kimengumi, anime (1985–1987)
- Ponytail wa Furimukanai, drama (1985–1986)
- Touch, anime (1985–1987)

== Endings ==
- Blue Comet SPT Layzner, anime (1985–1986)
- Dengeki Sentai Changeman, tokusatsu (1985–1986)
- Kyojuu Tokusou Juspion, tokusatsu (1985–1986)
- Musashi no Ken, anime (1985–1986)
- Sukeban Deka II: Shōjo Tekkamen Densetsu, drama (1985–1986)
- Urusei Yatsura, anime (1981–1986)
- Dr. Slump, anime (1981-1986)

== See also ==
- 1986 in anime
- List of Japanese television dramas
- 1986 in Japan
- List of Japanese films of 1986
