= 1981 in Japanese television =

| List of years in Japanese television |
- … 1971; 1972; 1973; 1974; 1975; 1976; 1977; 1978; 1979; 1980; 1981; 1982; 1983; 1984; 1985; 1986; 1987; 1988; 1989; 1990; 1991 …
- Art; Archaeology; Architecture; Literature; Music; Philosophy; Science; +...

Events in 1981 in Japanese television.

== Debuts ==
| Show | Station | Premiere Date | Genre | Original Run |
|---|---|---|---|---|
| Ai no Gakko Cuore Monogatari | | | anime | |
| Beast King GoLion | TV Tokyo | March 4 | anime | March 4, 1981 – February 24, 1982 |
| Braiger | | | anime | |
| Golden Warrior Gold Lightan | | | anime | |
| GoShogun | | | anime | |
| Hello! Sandybell | | | anime | |
| Onna Taikoki | | | Taiga drama | |
| Shadow Warriors II | | | drama | |
| Superbook | | | anime | |
| The Swiss Family Robinson: Flone of the Mysterious Island | | | anime | |
| Taiyo Sentai Sun Vulcan | TV Asahi | February 7 | tokusatsu | February 7, 1981 – January 30, 1982 |
| Urusei Yatsura | Fuji TV | October 14 | anime | October 14, 1981 – March 19, 1986 |
| Yattodetaman | | | anime | |
| Dr. Slump | Fuji TV | April 8 | anime | April 8, 1981 – February 19, 1986 |

== Ongoing ==
- Music Fair, music (1964–present)
- Mito Kōmon, jidaigeki (1969–2011)
- Sazae-san, anime (1969–present)
- Fisherman Sanpei, anime (1980–1982)
- Ōedo Sōsamō, anime (1970–1984)
- Ōoka Echizen, jidaigeki (1970–1999)
- Star Tanjō!, talent (1971–1983)
- FNS Music Festival, music (1974–present)
- Ikkyū-san, anime (1975–1982)
- Panel Quiz Attack 25, game show (1975–present)
- Doraemon, anime (1979–2005)

== Endings ==
| Show | Station | Ending Date | Genre | Original Run |
|---|---|---|---|---|
| Baldios | Tokyo Channel 12 | January 25 | anime | June 30, 1980 – January 25, 1981 |
| Denshi Sentai Denziman | TV Asahi | January 31 | tokusatsu | February 2, 1980 – January 31, 1981 |
| Kamen Rider Super-1 | | | tokusatsu | |
| Invincible Robo Trider G7 | Nagoya TV | January 24 | anime | February 2, 1980 – January 24, 1981 |
| Muteking, The Dashing Warrior | | | anime | |
| Rescueman | | | anime | |
| X-Bomber | | | tokusatsu | |
| Ultraman 80 | TBS | March 25 | tokusatsu | April 2, 1980 – March 25, 1981 |

== See also ==
- 1981 in anime
- 1981 in Japan
- List of Japanese films of 1981
