= 1983 in Japan =

- Decades: 1960s; 1970s; 1980s; 1990s; 2000s
- See also: Other events of 1983; History of Japan • Timeline • Years

Events in the year 1983 in Japan.

== Incumbents ==
- Emperor: Hirohito (Emperor Shōwa)
- Prime Minister: Yasuhiro Nakasone (L–Gunma, 1st term until 27 December 2nd term from 27 December)
- Chief Cabinet Secretary: Masaharu Gotōda (L–Tokushima) until December 27, Takao Fujinami (L–Mie)
- Chief Justice of the Supreme Court: Jirō Terata
- President of the House of Representatives: Hajime Fukuda (L–Fukui) until November 28 Kenji Fukunaga (L–Saitama) from December 26
- President of the House of Councillors: Masatoshi Tokunata (L–national) until July 9, Mutsuo Kimura (L–Okayama) from July 18
- Diet sessions: 98th (regular session opened in December 1982, to May 26), 99th (extraordinary, July 18 to July 23), 100th (extraordinary, September 8 to November 28; note that the next regular Diet session was already scheduled to start on December 15 when the House was dissolved in the wake of Kakuei Tanaka's conviction in the Lockheed scandal case), 101st (special, December 26 to 1984)

=== Governors ===
- Aichi Prefecture: Yoshiaki Nakaya (until 14 February); Reiji Suzuki (starting 15 February)
- Akita Prefecture: Kikuji Sasaki
- Aomori Prefecture: Masaya Kitamura
- Chiba Prefecture: Takeshi Numata
- Ehime Prefecture: Haruki Shiraishi
- Fukui Prefecture: Heidayū Nakagawa
- Fukuoka Prefecture: Hikaru Kamei (until 22 April); Hachiji Okuda (starting 23 April)
- Fukushima Prefecture: Isao Matsudaira
- Gifu Prefecture: Yosuke Uematsu
- Gunma Prefecture: Ichiro Shimizu
- Hiroshima Prefecture: Toranosuke Takeshita
- Hokkaido: Naohiro Dōgakinai (until 22 April); Takahiro Yokomichi (starting 23 April)
- Hyogo Prefecture: Tokitada Sakai
- Ibaraki Prefecture: Fujio Takeuchi
- Ishikawa Prefecture: Yōichi Nakanishi
- Iwate Prefecture: Tadashi Nakamura
- Kagawa Prefecture: Tadao Maekawa
- Kagoshima Prefecture: Kaname Kamada
- Kanagawa Prefecture: Kazuji Nagasu
- Kochi Prefecture: Chikara Nakauchi
- Kumamoto Prefecture: Issei Sawada (until 10 February); Morihiro Hosokawa (starting 10 February)
- Kyoto Prefecture: Yukio Hayashida
- Mie Prefecture: Ryōzō Tagawa
- Miyagi Prefecture: Sōichirō Yamamoto
- Miyazaki Prefecture: Suketaka Matsukata
- Nagano Prefecture: Gorō Yoshimura
- Nagasaki Prefecture: Isamu Takada
- Nara Prefecture: Shigekiyo Ueda
- Niigata Prefecture: Takeo Kimi
- Oita Prefecture: Morihiko Hiramatsu
- Okayama Prefecture: Shiro Nagano
- Okinawa Prefecture: Junji Nishime
- Osaka Prefecture: Sakae Kishi
- Saga Prefecture: Kumao Katsuki
- Saitama Prefecture: Yawara Hata
- Shiga Prefecture: Masayoshi Takemura
- Shiname Prefecture: Seiji Tsunematsu
- Shizuoka Prefecture: Keizaburō Yamamoto
- Tochigi Prefecture: Yuzuru Funada
- Tokushima Prefecture: Shinzo Miki
- Tokyo: Shun'ichi Suzuki
- Tottori Prefecture: Kōzō Hirabayashi (until 9 March); Yuji Nishio (starting 13 April)
- Toyama Prefecture: Yutaka Nakaoki
- Wakayama Prefecture: Shirō Kariya
- Yamagata Prefecture: Seiichirō Itagaki
- Yamaguchi Prefecture: Toru Hirai
- Yamanashi Prefecture: Kōmei Mochizuki

== Events ==
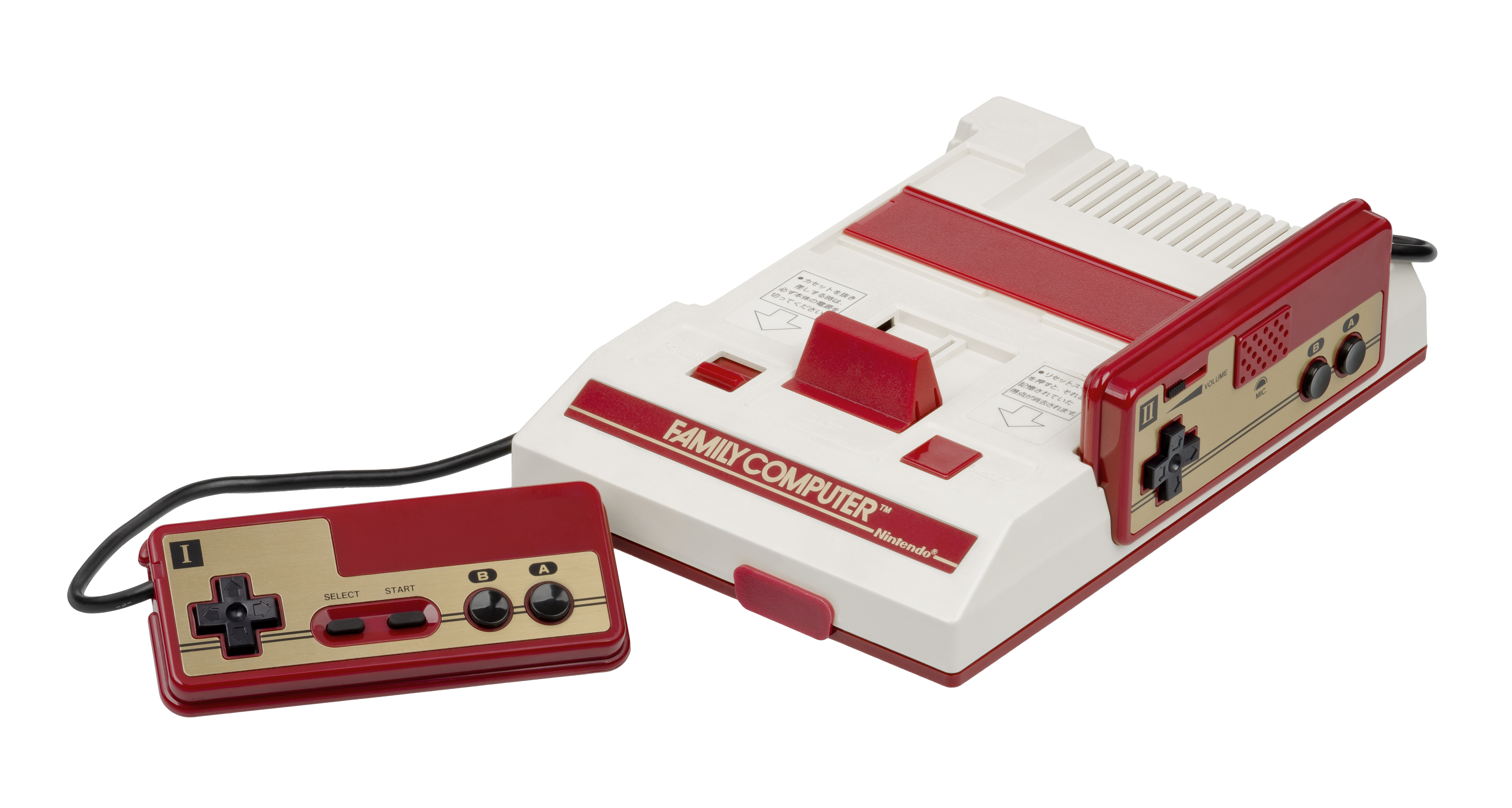
Nintendo's Family Computer home video game console

- Korean Air Lines Flight 007
- February 21 – A hotel fire in Zao Spa, Yamagata, according to Fire and Disaster Management Agency of Japan official confirmed report, 11 people died, 2 were wounded.
- April 15 – Tokyo Disneyland opens.
- April 19 – A C-1 transport plane crash off coast Toba, Mie Prefecture, according to official results, 14 people died.
- May 26 – The 7.8 M_{w} Sea of Japan earthquake shakes northern Honshu with a maximum Mercalli intensity of VIII (Severe). A destructive tsunami is generated that leaves about 100 people dead.
- May 28 – Golgo 13: The Professional is released in cinemas in Japan.
- June 26 – House of Councillors election
- July 15 – The Nintendo Family Computer is released in Japan.
- July 29 – According to Japanese government official confirmed report, heavy massive torrential rain and debris flow occur hit in Masuda, Hamada and Tsuwano, around western Honshu, according to Japan Fire and Disaster Management Agency official confirm report, 117 persons were human fatalities and 193 persons were wounded.
- October 12 – Ex-Prime Minister Kakuei Tanaka found guilty of accepting $2 million bribe from Lockheed Corporation, receives 4-year jail sentence.
- November 11 – Ronald Reagan first US President to address Diet.
- November 22- A gas explosion occurred on resort facility in Kakegawa, Shizuoka Prefecture, according to Fire and Disaster Management Agency official confirmed report, 14 people died, 27 people were wounded.
- November 28 – In the wake of former Liberal Democratic Party president Kakuei Tanaka's conviction in the Lockheed scandal case, the House of Representatives is dissolved and early elections are called for December.
- December 18 – In the 37th general election for the House of Representatives, Liberal Democrats lose their majority for the second time after the "Lockheed election" of 1976. Party president Yasuhiro Nakasone forms the first coalition government in party history with the New Liberal Club. Kakuei Tanaka defends his seat in Niigata 3rd district with a record result.

== Popular culture ==
=== Arts and entertainment ===
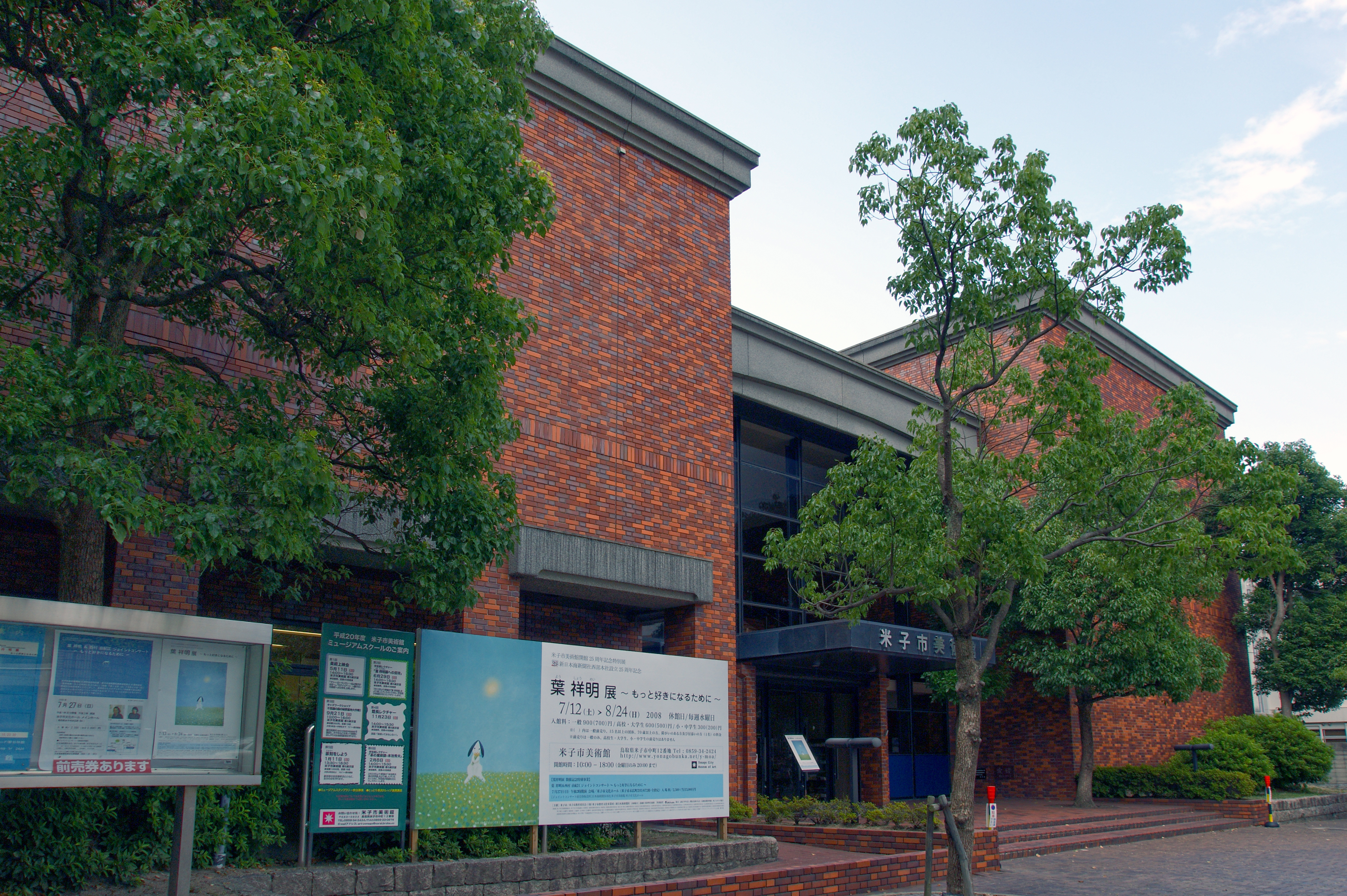
Yonago City Museum of Art, opened in 1983.

In anime, the winners of Animage's Anime Grand Prix were the film Crusher Joe for best work, episode 27 (Ai wa nagareru) of The Super Dimension Fortress Macross for best episode, Chirico Cuvie (voiced by Hozumi Gōda) from Armored Trooper Votoms for best male character, Misa Hayase (voiced by Mika Doi) from The Super Dimension Fortress Macross for best female character, Akira Kamiya for best voice actor, Mami Koyama for best voice actress and the opening of Ginga Hyōryū Vifam, Hello Vifam by TAO for best song. For a list of anime released in 1983 see Category:1983 anime.

In film, The Ballad of Narayama by Shōhei Imamura won the Best film award at the Japan Academy Prize, The Family Game by Yoshimitsu Morita won Best film at the Hochi Film Awards and at the Yokohama Film Festival and Tokyo Trial by Masaki Kobayashi won Best film at the Blue Ribbon Awards. For a list of Japanese films released in 1983 see Japanese films of 1983.

In manga, the winners of the Shogakukan Manga Award were Hidamari no Ki by Osamu Tezuka (general), Musashi no Ken by Motoka Murakami (shōnen), Kisshō Tennyo by Akimi Yoshida (shōjo) and Panku Ponk by Haruko Tachiiri (children). Domu: A Child's Dream by Katsuhiro Otomo won the Seiun Award for Best Comic of the Year. For a list of manga released in 1983 see Category:1983 manga.

In music, the 34th Kōhaku Uta Gassen was won by the White Team (men). Takashi Hosokawa won the 25th Japan Record Awards, held on December 31, and the FNS Music Festival. For other music, see 1983 in Japanese music.

In television, see: 1983 in Japanese television.

Japan hosted the Miss International 1983 beauty pageant, won by Costa Rican Gidget Sandoval.

=== Sports ===
In football (soccer), Japan hosted the 1983 Intercontinental Cup between Hamburger SV and Grêmio, won by Grêmio 2-1. Yomiuri won the Japan Soccer League. For the champions of the regional leagues see: 1983 Japanese Regional Leagues.

In volleyball, Japan hosted and won the Men's and Women's Asian Volleyball Championship.

== Births ==
- January 1 – Emi Kobayashi, model and actress
- January 14 – Takako Uehara, singer
- January 19 – Hikaru Utada, singer and songwriter
- January 20 – Mari Yaguchi, singer and actress
- January 25 – Yasuyuki Konno, footballer
- February 19
  - Nozomi Sasaki, voice actress
  - Mika Nakashima, singer and actress
- March 20 – Eiji Kawashima, footballer
- May 9 – Ryuhei Matsuda, actor
- May 12
  - Kan Otake, professional baseball player
  - Yujiro Kushida, wrestler and mixed martial artist
- May 17 – Nobuhiro Matsuda, professional baseball player
- June 8 – Mamoru Miyano, voice actor
- June 17 – Kazunari Ninomiya, actor, idol and singer
- July 5 – Kumiko Ogura, badminton player
- July 12 – Megumi Kawamura, model
- July 24 – Asami Mizukawa, actress
- August 30
  - Jun Matsumoto, singer and actor
  - Naoto Kataoka, singer and actor
- September 22 – Eriko Imai, singer
- September 30
  - Machiko Kawana, voice actress
  - Reiko Shiota, badminton player
- October 3 – Hiroki Suzuki, actor
- October 4 – Risa Kudō, gravure idol
- October 12 – Mariko Yamamoto
- October 25 – Princess Yōko of Mikasa
- November 11
  - Sora Aoi, model
  - Tatsuhisa Suzuki, voice actor
- November 25 – Atsushi Itō, actor
- November 26 – Emiri Katō, voice actress and singer
- December 28 – Aiko Nakamura, tennis player

== Deaths ==
- January 9: Ichiro Nakagawa, politician (b. 1925)
- January 15: Masatane Kanda, lieutenant general (b. 1890)
- January 21: Ton Satomi, author (b. 1888)
- March 1: Hideo Kobayashi, author (b. 1902)
- March 31: Chiezō Kataoka, actor (b. 1903)
- April 13: Nakamura Ganjirō II, film actor (b. 1902)
- May 4: Shūji Terayama, poet, dramatist, writer, film director, and photographer (b. 1935)
- July 26: Kimiyoshi Yasuda, film director (b. 1911)
- September 4: Katsutoshi Nekoda, volleyball player (b. 1944)
- October 23: Toru Takahashi, race car driver (b. 1960)
- November 2: Tamura Taijiro, novelist (b. 1911)

== See also ==
- 1983 in Japanese television
- List of Japanese films of 1983
