= 2nd Yokohama Film Festival =

1981 Japanese film festival edition

- Location: Tsurumi, Kanagawa, Japan
- Founded: 1980
- Festival date: 8 February 1981

The 2nd Yokohama Film Festival (第2回ヨコハマ映画祭) was held on 8 February 1981 in Keihin Film Theatre, Tsurumi, Kanagawa, Japan.

== Awards ==
- Best Film: Zigeunerweisen
- Best New Actor: Tatsuo Yamada – Crazy Thunder Road
- Best Actor: Masato Furuoya – Disciples of Hippocrates
- Best Actress: Hiroko Yakushimaru – Tonda Couple
- Best New Actress: Keiko Oginome – Kaichō-on
- Best Supporting Actor: Morio Kazama – Shiki Natsuko, Yūgure made
- Best Supporting Actress: Ran Itoh – Disciples of Hippocrates
- Best Director: Seijun Suzuki – Zigeunerweisen
- Best New Director: Shinji Sōmai – Tonda Couple
- Best Screenplay: Shoichi Maruyama – Tonda Couple, The Beast to Die
- Best Cinematography: Kazue Nagatsuka – Zigeunerweisen
- Best Independent Film: Crazy Thunder Road
- Special Prize:
  - Tai Kato (Career)
  - Yūsaku Matsuda (Career)

== Best 10 ==
1. Zigeunerweisen
2. Tonda Couple
3. Crazy Thunder Road
4. The Beast to Die
5. The Battle of Port Arthur
6. Disciples of Hippocrates
7. Onna no Hosomichi: Nureta Kaikyo
8. Heaven Sent
9. Tekkihei, Tonda
10. The Castle of Cagliostro
