= List of Japanese films of 1989 =

A list of films released in Japan in 1989 (see 1989 in film).

Title	Director	Cast	Genre	Notes
A Sign Days	Yoichi Sai	Anna Nakagawa, Ryo Ishibashi		
Black Rain	Shohei Imamura	Yoshiko Tanaka, Kazuo Kitamura, Etsuko Ichihara	—N/a	
Blood Reign: Curse of the Yoma	Takashi Anno		—N/a	Animated feature
Buddies	Yasuo Furuhata	Ken Takakura, Eiji Bando, Sumiko Fuji	Melodrama	
The Dancer	Masahiro Shinoda	Hiromi Go, Lisa Wolf, Brigitte Grothum	Drama	Japanese-West German-East German co-production
Death of a Tea Master	Kei Kumai	Eiji Okuda, Toshiro Mifune, Kinnosuke Nakamura	—N/a	
Dochini suruno	Shusuke Kaneko	Miho Nakayama, Toru Kazama, Rie Miyazawa	—N/a	
Doraemon: Nobita and the Birth of Japan	Tsutomu Shibayama		—N/a	Animated film
Dragon Ball Z: Dead Zone	Daisuke Nishio	Masako Nozawa	Anime; Martial Arts	The first Dragon Ball Z film
The Five Star Stories	Kazuo Yamazaki		—N/a	Animated feature
Fuyu monogatari	Hitoshi Kurauchi	Yoichi Yamada, Masumi Miyazaki, Maki Mizuno	—N/a	
Godzilla vs. Biollante	Kazuki Ōmori	Kunihiko Mitamura, Yoshiko Tanaka, Masanobu Takashima	—N/a	
Gunhed	Masato Harada	Masahiro Takashima, Brenda Bakke, Yujin Harada	Science fiction, action	
Haroo Kiti no Shinderera	Tameo Ohanawa		—N/a	Animated short
Kamen Rider: Stay in the World				
Kanojoga mizugini kigaetara	Yasuo Baba	Tomoyo Harada, Yūji Oda, Kazue Ito	—N/a	
Kiki's Delivery Service	Hayao Miyazaki		—N/a	
Kiki to Rara no Aoitori	Masami Hata		—N/a	Animated short
Mai Fenikkusu	Katsumi Nishikawa	Yasuko Tomita, Bunta Sugawara, Atsushi Watanabe	—N/a	
Mai Merodii no akazukin	Hidemi Kubo		—N/a	Animated short
Mangetsu no Kuchizuke	Ryū Kaneda	Eri Fukatsu, Yasufumi Terawaki, Akiko Matsumura	—N/a	
Mini-Dora SOS	Makoto Moriwaki		—N/a	Animated short
Saint Seiya: Warriors of the Final Holy Battle				
Shaso	Toshio Masuda	Hideko Yoshida		
Sweet Home	Kiyoshi Kurosawa	Nobuko Miyamoto, Shingo Yamashiro, Nokko	Horror	
Turboranger Movie			Action for Children	
Tetsuo: The Iron Man	Shinya Tsukamoto	Tomorowo Taguchi, Kei Fujiwara, Shinya Tsukamoto		
Tora-San Goes to Vienna	Yoji Yamada	Kiyoshi Atsumi, Chieko Baisho, Chieko Misaki	Comedy	
Tora-san, My Uncle	Yoji Yamada	Kiyoshi Atsumi, Chieko Baisho, Chieko Misaki	Comedy	
Ultraman: The Adventure Begins	Mitsuo Hikabe		—N/a	
Urutoraman–Kyofu no ruto 87	Yuzo Higuchi	Akiji Kobayashi	—N/a	
Urutoraman A–Owari choju tai Urutora kyodai	Tei Mafune	Keiji Takamine	—N/a	
Urutoraman Kizzu	Tei Mafune	Keiji Takamine	—N/a	
Utsunomiko	Kenji Yoshida		—N/a	Animated feature
Violent Cop	Takeshi Kitano	Takeshi Kitano, Maiko Kawakami	Thriller	
YAWARA!	Kazuo Yoshida	Yui Asaka, Keiju Kobayashi, Bunta Sugawara	—N/a	
Zatoichi	Shintaro Katsu	Shintaro Katsu, Ken Ogata, Yusaka Matsuda	—N/a	

== See also ==
- 1989 in Japan
- 1989 in Japanese television
