= Sadaaki =

- Gender: Male

Origin
- Origin: Japanese
- Meaning: Different meanings depending on the kanji used

Sadaaki (written: 貞明, 貞暁, 貞顕, 定敬 or 禎章) is a masculine Japanese given name. Notable people with the name include:

- Sadaaki Akamatsu (赤松 貞明; 1910–1980), Japanese World War II flying ace
- Hōjō Sadaaki (北条 貞顕; 1278–1333), Japanese regent
- Sadaaki Konishi (1916–1949), Imperial Japanese Army officer
- Matsudaira Sadaaki (松平 定敬; 1847–1908), Japanese daimyō
- Sadaaki Senda (千田 貞暁; 1836–1908), Japanese politician
- Sadaaki Yoshimura (吉村 禎章; born 1963), Japanese baseball player
