= Hirahara =

Hirahara (written: 平原) is a Japanese surname. Notable people with the surname include:

- Ayaka Hirahara (平原 綾香, born 1984), Japanese singer
- Masayuki Hirahara (平原 誠之, born 1980), Japanese classical pianist and composer
- Naomi Hirahara (born 1962), Japanese-American mystery author

== See also ==
- Hirahara Station (平原駅, Hirahara-eki), a train station in Komoro City, Nagano Prefecture, Japan
