= List of Japanese films of 1987 =

A list of films released in Japan in 1987 (see 1987 in film).

Title	Director	Cast	Genre	Notes
1987
Actress	Kon Ichikawa	Sayuri Yoshinaga, Mitsuko Mori, Bunta Sugawara	—N/a	
Deshima	Beat Kuert	Leon Askin, Marius Müller-Westernhagen, Kaho Minami, Miyoko Akaza	Drama	Swiss-West German-Japanese co-production
Dragon Ball: Sleeping Princess in Devil's Castle				
Eien no 1/2	Kichitaro Negishi	Saburō Tokitō		
The Emperor's Naked Army Marches On	Kazuo Hara			
Flashman: Big Rally! Titan Boy!				
Haikara-san ga Tōru	Masamichi Satō			Based on a manga
Maskman Movie				
Royal Space Force: The Wings of Honnêamise	Hiroyuki Yamaga			
Saint Seiya: Legend of the Golden Apple				First of the Saint Seiya films.
Shinran: Path to Purity	Rentarō Mikuni			Won the Jury Prize at the 1987 Cannes Film Festival
Take me out to the Snowland	Yasuo Baba	Tomoyo Harada	Romantic comedy	
A Taxing Woman	Juzo Itami	Nobuko Miyamoto; Tsutomu Yamazaki	comedy	Japan Academy Prize for Best Film
Time of the Apes			Science fiction	Filmed in 1974
Tora-san Plays Daddy	Yoji Yamada	Kiyoshi Atsumi	Comedy	39th in the Otoko wa Tsurai yo series
Tora-san Goes North	Yoji Yamada	Kiyoshi Atsumi	Comedy	38th in the Otoko wa Tsurai yo series
Zegen	Shōhei Imamura	Mitsuko Baisho		Entered into the 1987 Cannes Film Festival

== See also ==
- 1987 in Japan
- 1987 in Japanese television
