= 1989 in Japan =

- Decades: 1960s; 1970s; 1980s; 1990s; 2000s
- See also: Other events of 1989; History of Japan • Timeline • Years

Events in the year 1989 in Japan. In the history of Japan, it marks the final year of the Shōwa period, Shōwa 64, upon the death of Emperor Shōwa on January 7, and the beginning of the Heisei period, Heisei 1 (平成元年 Heisei gannen, gannen means "first year"), from January 8 under the reign of his eldest son, the current Emperor Emeritus. Thus, 1989 corresponds to the transition between Shōwa and Heisei periods in the Japanese calendar.

1989 was the first year of Heisei era in Japan as well as the all-time peak of the Nikkei 225 stock market average until being surpassed in 2024.

== Incumbents ==
- Emperor:
  - Shōwa (until January 7)
  - Akihito (starting January 7)
- Prime Minister:
  - Noboru Takeshita (Liberal Democratic–Shimane) (until June 3)
  - Sōsuke Uno (Liberal Democratic–Shiga) (June 3 – August 10)
  - Toshiki Kaifu (Liberal Democratic–Aichi) (starting August 10)
- Chief Cabinet Secretary: Keizo Obuchi (Liberal Democratic–Gunma) until June 3, Tokuo Yamashita (Liberal Democratic–Saga) until August 25, Mayumi Moriyama (Councillor, Liberal Democratic–Tochigi)
- Chief Justice of the Supreme Court: Kōichi Yaguchi
- Speaker of the House of Representatives: Kenzaburō Hara (Liberal Democratic–Hyōgo) until June 2, Hajime Tamura (Liberal Democratic–Mie)
- President of the House of Councillors: Yoshihiko Tsuchiya (Liberal Democratic–Saitama) until July 9 and again from August 7
- National Diet sessions: 114th (regular session opened in December 1988, to June 22), 115th (extraordinary, August 7 to August 12), 116th (extraordinary, September 28 to December 16), 117th (regular, December 25 to 1990, January 24)

=== Governors ===
- Aichi Prefecture: Reiji Suzuki
- Akita Prefecture: Kikuji Sasaki
- Aomori Prefecture: Masaya Kitamura
- Chiba Prefecture: Takeshi Numata
- Ehime Prefecture: Sadayuki Iga
- Fukui Prefecture: Yukio Kurita
- Fukuoka Prefecture: Hachiji Okuda
- Fukushima Prefecture: Eisaku Satō
- Gifu Prefecture: Yosuke Uematsu (until 5 February); Taku Kajiwara (starting 6 February)
- Gunma Prefecture: Ichiro Shimizu
- Hiroshima Prefecture: Toranosuke Takeshita
- Hokkaido: Takahiro Yokomichi
- Hyogo Prefecture: Toshitami Kaihara
- Ibaraki Prefecture: Fujio Takeuchi
- Ishikawa Prefecture: Yōichi Nakanishi
- Iwate Prefecture: Tadashi Nakamura
- Kagawa Prefecture: Jōichi Hirai
- Kagoshima Prefecture: Kaname Kamada (until 27 February); Yoshiteru Tsuchiya (starting 27 February)
- Kanagawa Prefecture: Kazuji Nagasu
- Kochi Prefecture: Chikara Nakauchi
- Kumamoto Prefecture: Morihiro Hosokawa
- Kyoto Prefecture: Teiichi Aramaki
- Mie Prefecture: Ryōzō Tagawa
- Miyagi Prefecture: Sōichirō Yamamoto (until 28 March); Shuntarō Honma (starting 28 March)
- Miyazaki Prefecture: Suketaka Matsukata
- Nagano Prefecture: Gorō Yoshimura
- Nagasaki Prefecture: Isamu Takada
- Nara Prefecture: Shigekiyo Ueda
- Niigata Prefecture: Takeo Kimi (until 13 April); Kiyoshi Kaneko (starting 4 June)
- Oita Prefecture: Morihiko Hiramatsu
- Okayama Prefecture: Shiro Nagano
- Okinawa Prefecture: Junji Nishime
- Osaka Prefecture: Sakae Kishi
- Saga Prefecture: Kumao Katsuki
- Saitama Prefecture: Yawara Hata
- Shiga Prefecture: Minoru Inaba
- Shiname Prefecture: Nobuyoshi Sumita
- Shizuoka Prefecture: Shigeyoshi Saitō
- Tochigi Prefecture: Fumio Watanabe
- Tokushima Prefecture: Shinzo Miki
- Tokyo: Shun'ichi Suzuki
- Tottori Prefecture: Yuji Nishio
- Toyama Prefecture: Yutaka Nakaoki
- Wakayama Prefecture: Shirō Kariya
- Yamagata Prefecture: Seiichirō Itagaki
- Yamaguchi Prefecture: Toru Hirai
- Yamanashi Prefecture: Kōmei Mochizuki

== Events ==
=== January ===
- January 4
  - Murder of Junko Furuta
- January 7
  - Death of Hirohito: At 7:55 am, Imperial Household Agency announces that Emperor Hirohito has died peacefully, aged 87.
  - Akihito becomes 125th Emperor of Japan upon the death of his father.
- January 8: Shōwa era ends and Heisei era officially begins.

=== February ===
- February 7: Last public performance by singer Misora Hibari held in Kitakyushu.
- February 13: The Recruit scandal breaks, and the company's former president is arrested.
- February 24: State funeral of Hirohito: A funeral is held at Shinjuku Gyo-en. Emperor Shōwa is buried at Musashi Imperial Graveyard alongside his parents, Emperor Taishō and Empress Teimei.

=== March ===
- March 25 – "YES'89", celebrating 100th anniversary of the foundations of Yokohama City and 130th anniversary of the opening of the Port of Yokohama, is held until October 1.

=== April ===
- April 1
  - Japan introduces its first national consumption tax of three percent.
  - Sendai becomes a city designated by government ordinance.
- April 25: Prime Minister Noboru Takeshita announces his resignation following a stock-trading scandal.
- April 26: The Dragon Ball Z anime series starts on Fuji TV.

=== June ===
- June 1: 100th anniversary of the foundation of Fukuoka City.
- June 2: Takeshita cabinet resigns, Sōsuke Uno becomes Prime Minister.

=== July ===
- July 1: 100th anniversary of the foundations of Kōfu and Gifu City.
- July 12: 100th anniversary of the foundation of Akita City.
- July 16: A large-scale landslides occurred, following to a microbus crushed by rockfall prevention in Echizen, Fukui Prefecture, according to official confirmed report, 15 people fatalities.
- July 23
  - In the 15th regular election for the House of Councillors, Liberal Democrats lose their majority for the first time in party history. In the ensuing "twisted Diet" (nejire kokkai), it must cooperate with the Socialist-led opposition as it does not hold a two-thirds majority in the House of Representatives. The Uno cabinet resigns.

=== August ===
- August 8: Reformist Toshiki Kaifu from the small Kōmoto faction is elected LDP president with 279 votes against Yoshirō Hayashi (Nikaidō group, a breakaway group from the Takeshita faction, 120 votes) and Shintarō Ishihara (formerly with his own faction that merged into the Abe faction in 1984, 48 votes)
- August 9: First Kaifu cabinet formed and formally appointed one day later.

=== September ===
- September 3: Bunkamura opens.
- September 27: Yokohama Bay Bridge opens.

=== October ===
- October 1: 100th anniversary of the foundations of Nagoya City, Tottori City and Tokushima City.
- October 8: Eight climbers died of hypothermia on Mount Tate, Toyama Prefecture.

=== November ===
- November 4: Sakamoto family murder - Aum Shinrikyo murders a lawyer, Tsutsumi Sakamoto, as well as his wife, Satoko, and infant son, Tatsuhiko, who had been working on a lawsuit against the religious group.
- November 22: The Japan Trade Union Confederation, or "RENGO", is founded with the merger of the Japan Confederation of Labor (Dōmei) and the Federation of Independent Labor Unions (Chūritsu Rōren).

=== December ===
- December 15: 100th anniversary of the foundation of Matsuyama City.
- December 29: The Nikkei 225 index of the Tokyo Stock Exchange reaches its all-time record high of 38,915.87.

== Births ==
- January 3 – Kōhei Uchimura, gymnast
- January 25 – Mikako Tabe, stage and film actress
- February 2 – Shuhei Fukuda, professional baseball player
- February 25: Kana Hanazawa, actress and singer
- March 17 – Shinji Kagawa, football player
- March 18 – Kana Nishino, singer-songwriter
- March 23 – Natsuna Watanabe, actress and model
- April 8 – Hitomi Takahashi, singer
- April 11 – Yoshihiro Maru, professional baseball player
- May 30
  - Yui Ishikawa, actress and voice actress
  - Akiyo Noguchi, professional rock climber
- June 5 – Megumi Nakajima, voice actress and singer
- June 7 – Seiji Kobayashi, professional baseball player
- June 23 – Ayana Taketatsu, voice actress and singer
- July 9 – Kiyono Yasuno, voice actress and singer
- July 13 – Sayumi Michishige, singer
- September 7 – Daiki Yamashita, voice actor
- September 17 – Yuhei Nakaushiro, baseball player
- September 26 – Chinami Suzuki, model, television host, and actress
- September 29 – Makoto Furukawa, voice actor
- October 11 – Tomoyuki Sugano, professional baseball pitcher
- October 21 – May'n, singer
- November 11
  - Reina Tanaka, singer
  - Chiaki Omigawa, voice actress and actress
- November 23 – Shinya Kayama, professional baseball player
- December 27 – Maaya Uchida, actress, voice actress and singer
- December 29 – Kei Nishikori, tennis player
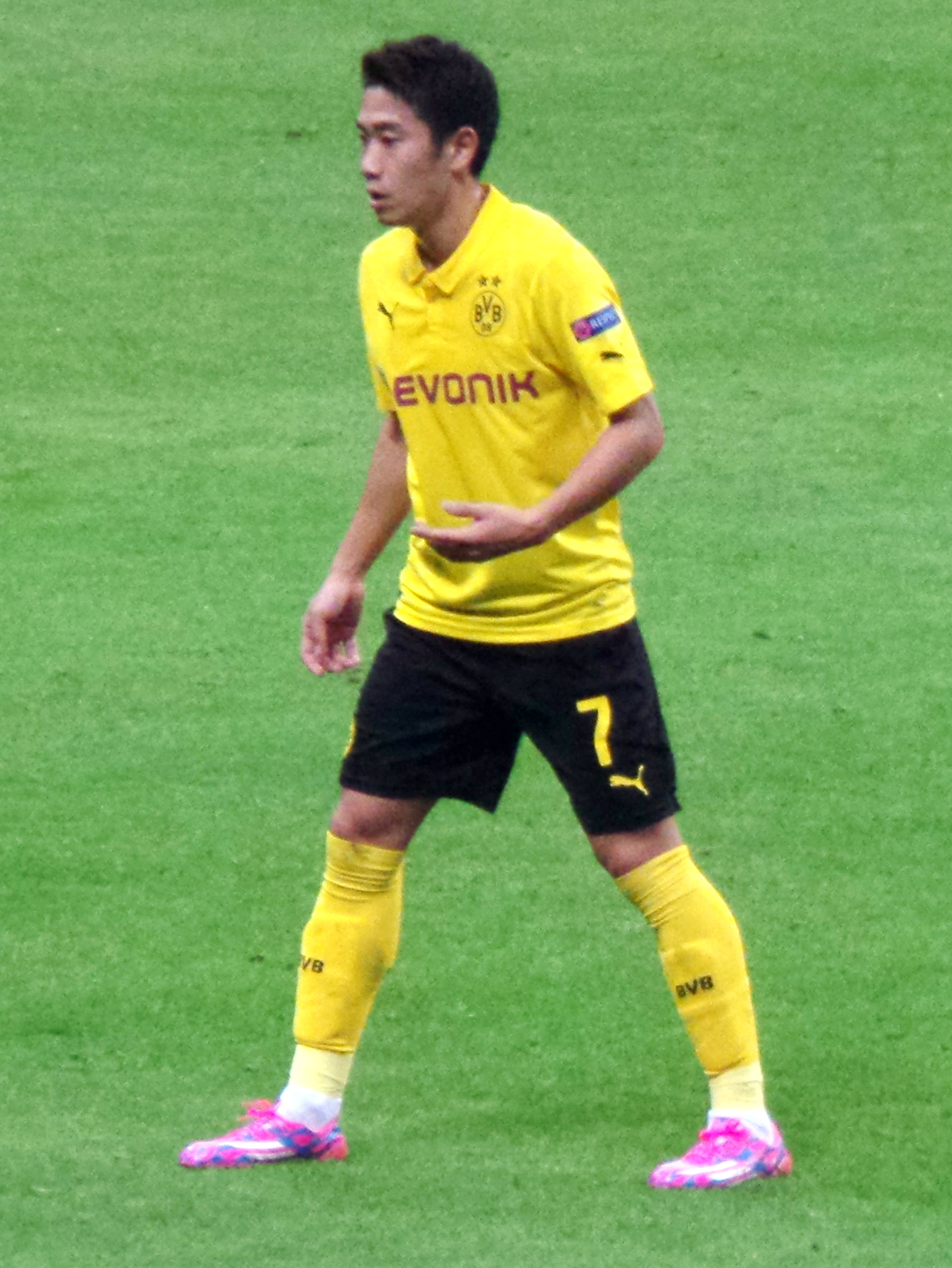
Shinji Kagawa

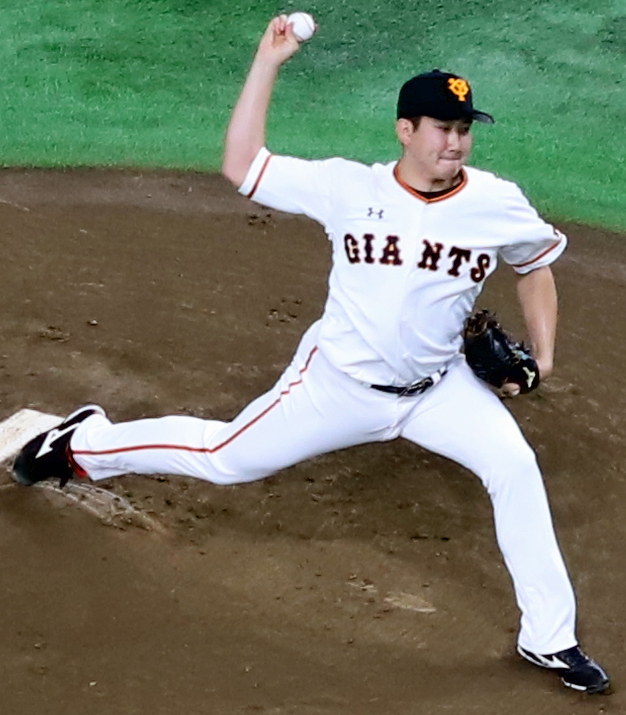
Tomoyuki Sugano

== Deaths ==
- January 4 – Junko Furuta, murder victim (b. 1971)
- January 7 – Emperor Shōwa (b. 1901)
- January 31 – Yasushi Akutagawa, composer and conductor (b. 1925)
- February 9 – Osamu Tezuka, manga artist (b. 1928)
- April 27 – Konosuke Matsushita, founder of Matsushita Electric (b. 1894)
- May 15
  - Noriko Tsukase, voice actress (b. 1945)
  - Yae Ibuka, nurse (b. 1897)
- June 2 – Takeo Watanabe, musician and composer (b. 1933)
- June 24 – Hibari Misora, singer and actress (b. 1937)
- August 15 – Minoru Genda, military aviator and politician (b. 1904)
- August 18 – Yuji Koseki, composer (b. 1909)
- October 26 – Kumeko Urabe, film actor (b. 1902).
- November 6 – Yūsaku Matsuda, actor (b. 1949)
- December 12 – Suiho Tagawa, manga artist (b. 1899)
- December 30 – Yasuji Miyazaki, Olympic swimmer (b. 1916)

== Statistics ==
- Yen value: US$1 = ¥127 (low) to ¥144 (high)

== See also ==
- 1989 in Japanese television
- List of Japanese films of 1989
- 1989 in Japanese music
