= Uchū no hōsoku =

- Theatrical release poster
- Directed by: Kazuyuki Izutsu
- Written by: Kazuyuki Izutsu; Yasushi Asai
- Produced by: Katsunori Arai; Takashi Matsuki
- Starring: Masato Furuoya; Mari Torigoe; Kyōzō Nagatsuka; Akira Emoto; Naoto Takenaka
- Cinematography: Noboru Shinoda
- Edited by: Satoshi Yoshioka
- Distributed by: Daiei
- Release date: January 27, 1990 (Japan)
- Running time: 119 minutes
- Country: Japan
- Language: Japanese

Uchū no hōsoku (Japanese: 宇宙の法則), also known as Universal Laws or Laws of the Universe, is a 1990 Japanese drama film co-written and directed by Kazuyuki Izutsu. The film stars Masato Furuoya, Mari Torigoe, Kyōzō Nagatsuka, Akira Emoto and Naoto Takenaka. Daiei theatrically released Uchū no hōsoku on January 27, 1990, in Japan. The film's theme song "1% Story" (1%の物語) was performed by Stardust Revue.

== Cast ==
- Masato Furuoya as Yoshiaki Masaki
- Mari Torigoe as Reiko
- Kyōzō Nagatsuka as Kazuya
- Akira Emoto as Nagayama
- Naoto Takenaka as Sakuma
- Saburō Taihei as Murayama
- Fumio Tokita as Shozo
- Norihei Miki as Yasui
- Yoshimi Ashikawa as Emiko
- Haruko Mabuchi as Kimiko
- Minori Terada as Nakamura
- Megumi Yokoyama as Miki
- Ken'ichi Nagira as Oda
- Kippei Shiina as Morita (credited as Masayoshi Iwaki)
- Haruki Uchida
- Sakae Umezu

== Awards ==
12th Yokohama Film Festival

- Best Actor - Masato Furuoya
- 7th Best Film
