= Tekkihei, Tonda =

- Theatrical release poster
- Directed by: Keiichi Ozawa
- Starring: Jun'ichi Ishida; Miyuki Matsuda; Kaori Takeda; Jun Tanaka
- Release date: 16 August 1980 (Japan)
- Running time: 92 minutes
- Country: Japan
- Language: Japanese

Tekkihei, Tonda (Japanese: 鉄騎兵、跳んだ) is a 1980 Japanese film directed by Keiichi Ozawa.

== Cast ==
- Jun'ichi Ishida
- Miyuki Matsuda
- Kaori Takeda
- Jun Tanaka

== Reception ==
It was chosen as the 9th best film at the 2nd Yokohama Film Festival.
