= Bubble Fiction: Boom or Bust =

- Japanese poster
- Directed by: Yasuo Baba
- Written by: Ryoichi Kimizuka
- Produced by: Chihiro Kameyama (Executive Producer)
- Starring: Hiroko Yakushimaru; Hiroshi Abe; Ryōko Hirosue
- Cinematography: Kosuke Matushima
- Edited by: Hiroshi Okuda
- Music by: Yusuke Honma
- Production companies: Fuji Television; Toho Company; Dentsu; Shogakukan
- Distributed by: Toho Company
- Release date: February 10, 2007
- Running time: 116 minutes
- Country: Japan
- Language: Japanese

Bubble Fiction: Boom or Bust (バブルへGO!!～タイムマシンはドラム式～, Baburu e go!! Taimu mashin wa doramu-shiki) is a 2007 Japanese science fiction comedy film directed by Yasuo Baba available with English sub-titles. The plot centers on traveling in time from 2006 to 1990 and in the process compares some everyday things between 1990 and 2007 (e.g. cell phones) in a humorous way.

== Plot ==
When inventor Mariko Tanaka (Hiroko Yakushimaru), who works for Hitachi appliances, accidentally re-engineers a washing machine for time travel, the Japanese government then convinces her to go back in time to prevent the passage of a fictitious law that would prevent the usage of real estate as collateral for loans, which was a major cause of the bursting of the Japanese asset price bubble. However, when contact is lost after she goes back in time, the government then sends Isao Shimokawaji (Hiroshi Abe), who works for the Finance Ministry's Emergency Response Bureau to convince Mariko's estranged daughter Mayumi (Ryōko Hirosue), to go back in time to investigate (other ministry officials tried to use the time machine but all they ended up with were faded socks).

Some knowledge of such things as the presence of electronic turnstiles in the Tokyo subway is helpful with some sight-gags.

The film is also notable for the cameo appearances of celebrities who rose to prominence in Japan in the early 90s, including actresses Ai Iijima and Naoko Iijima, announcer Akiko Yagi, and soccer star Ruy Ramos. Each actor portrays a younger version of themselves.
