= List of Japanese films of 1981 =

A list of films released in Japan in 1981 (see 1981 in film).

Japanese films released in 1981
Title	Director	Cast	Genre	Notes
21emon–Uchu e irashai	Tsutomu Shibayama		—N/a	Animated feature
Abandoned	Shiro Moritani	Kinya Kitaoji, Tsunehiko Watase, Yoshiko Mita	—N/a	
Amoore no kane	Kunihiko Watanabe	Maako Kido, Hideto Matsumoto, Akira Oda	—N/a	
Blue Jeans Memory	Yoshiyuki Kawasaki	Masahiko Kondo, Yoshio Nomura, Toshihiko Tahara	—N/a	
Buriki no kunsho	Setsuo Nakayama	Katsuo Nakamura	—N/a	
Choko	Masashi Sada	Masashi Sada, Seiji Miyaguchi	Semi-documentary	
Doraemon: The Records of Nobita, Spaceblazer	Hideo Nishimaki	Nobuyo Ōyama	—N/a	Animated feature
Doraemon–Boku Momotaro no nannanosa	Takeyuki Kanada		—N/a	
Eijanaika	Shohei Imamura			
Flames of Blood	Tai Kato	Bunta Sugawara, Mitsuko Baisho, Tomisaburo Wakayama	—N/a	
Furiten-kun	Taku Sugiyama		—N/a	Animated feature
The Gate of Youth	Kinji Fukasaku, Koreyoshi Kurahara	Bunta Sugawara, Keiko Matsuzaka	—N/a	
Guddo rakku Love	Yoshiyuki Kawasaki	Masahiko Tahara, Yoshio Nomura, Masahiko Kondo	—N/a	
Honō no Gotoku				
The Imperial Navy	Shue Matsubayashi	Keiju Kobayashi, Toshiyuki Nagashima, Kenichi Kaneda	—N/a	
Jarinko Chie	Isao Takahata		—N/a	Animated feature
Kaibutsu-kun	Hiroshi Fukutomi		—N/a	Animated feature
Kagero-za	Seijun Suzuki			
Kamen Rider Super-1				
The Leprechauns' Christmas Gold	Jules Bass, Arthur Rankin, Jr.	Art Carney, Peggy Cass, Bob McFadden	Animation comedy family	
Lonely Heart	Kon Ichikawa	Yutaka Mizutani, Toshiyuki Nagashima, Rie Nakahara	—N/a	
Mobile Suit Gundam the Movie	Yoshiyuki Tomino			
Mobile Suit Gundam II: Soldiers of Sorrow	Yoshiyuki Tomino			
Muddy River	Kōhei Oguri			
Nerawareta gakuen	Nobuhiko Obayashi	Hiroko Yakushimaru, Ryoichi Takayanagi, Masami Hasegawa	—N/a	
Nihon no atsui hibi bôsatsu: Shimoyama jiken	Kei Kumai			
Office Lady Rope Slave	Katsuhiko Fujii	Junko Mabuki	Roman porno	
Return of the Champ	Tsugunobu Kotani	Yūzō Kayama, Kunie Tanaka, Ryoko Sakaguchi	—N/a	
Sailor Suit and Machine Gun	Shinji Sōmai	Hiroko Yakushimaru	Comedy/Action	
Seishun gurafitii–Suniikaa buruusu	Yoshiyuki Kawasaki	Masahiko Kondo, Yoshio Nomura, Toshihiko Tahara	—N/a	
Shikake-nin Baian	Yasuo Furuhata	Katsuo Nakamura		
Station	Yasuo Furuhata	Ken Takakura, Chieko Baisho, Ayumi Ishida	Drama	
Sukkari...Sonokide!	Tsugunobu Kotani	Setsuko Karasumu, Takeshi Kitano, Hitoshi Ueki	—N/a	
Swan Lake	Kimio Yabuki		Anime	
Sun Vulcan Movie	Shohei Tōjō			
This is Noriko	Zenzo Matsuyama	Noriko Tsuji	—N/a	
Tora-san's Love in Osaka	Yoji Yamada	Kiyoshi Atsumi	—N/a	
Tora-san's Promise	Yoji Yamada	Kiyoshi Atsumi	—N/a	
Woman Who Exposes Herself	Masaru Konuma	Maiko Kazama	Roman Porno	

== See also ==
- 1981 in Japan
- 1981 in Japanese television
