= Kimio Yanagisawa =

Japanese manga artist

- Born: Kimio Yanagisawa (柳澤 公夫) Gosen-shi, Niigata, Japan
- Area: Manga artist
- Notable works: Tonda Couple, Tokumei Kakarichō Tadano Hitoshi
- Awards: Kodansha Manga Award for Shōnen (1978)

Kimio Yanagisawa (Japanese: 柳沢 きみお, Hepburn: Yanagisawa Kimio; born September 26, 1948) is a Japanese manga artist. His real name is pronounced the same way, but is written with the kanji 柳澤 公夫. He graduated from Niigata Prefectural Muramatsu High School two years prior to Yoshifumi Kondō. After graduation, he attended Wakō University where he studied fine arts.

In 1972, Yanagisawa won an honorable mention in the 4th Tezuka Shō Manga Story contest for his story Makeru na Kisaburō (submitted under his real name). His contemporary, Kazuhito Kurosaki, also won second place in the same contest. In 1978, he won the 3rd Kodansha Manga Award for shōnen for Tonda Couple.

== Bibliography ==
=== Manga ===
List of manga works (at least 5 volumes)
| Title | Year | Notes | Refs |
|---|---|---|---|
| Keishiki Kekkon ja:形式結婚 | 1992–1998 (vol.) | Published by Action Comics, 25 volumes | |
| Roppongi Black Cross; N/A | 2014–2014 (vol.) | Published by N/A authors are Yusuke Mori and Yanagisawa Kimio, 70 volumes | |
| Tsuki to Suppon ja:月とスッポン | 1977–1982 (vol.) | Published by Boys Champion Comics, 23 volumes | |
| Shin Tokumei Kakarichō Tadano Hitoshi | 2002–2007 (vol.) | Published by Bunkansha Comics, 20 volumes | |
| Tonda Couple | 1978–1981 (vol.) | Serialized in Weekly Shonen Magazine, published by Kodansha, 15 volumes | |
| Tsuma wo Metoraba ja:妻をめとらば | 1987–1990 (vol.) | Published by Big Comics / Big Spirits Comics, 15 volumes | |
| 100% | 1988–1992 (vol.) | Published by Action Comics, 14 volumes | |
| Scrambled Eggs | 1978–1981 (vol.) | Published by Hit Comics, 12 volumes | |
| Dino | 1992–1994 (vol.) | Published by Big Comics, 12 volumes | |
| Sewing | 1992–1994 (vol.) | Published by Boys Champion Comics, 11 volumes | |
| Tokumei Kakarichō Tadano Hitoshi | 2001 (vol.) | Published by Bunkansha Comics, 9 volumes | |
| Good Girl | 1981–1984 (vol.) | Published by Young Magazine Comics, 9 volumes | |
| Mistress 愛人 | 1984–1991 (vol.) | Published by Action Comics, 8 volumes | |
| Dai shimin 大市民 | 1992–1996 (vol.) | Published by Action Comics, 9 volumes | |
| Nemomonogatari 寝物語 | 1989–1991 (vol.) | Published by Action Comics, 7 volumes | |
| Zoku Tonde Couple 続・翔んだカップル | 1986–1987 (vol.) | Published by KC Special, 7 volumes | |
| Ruri Iro Generation 瑠璃色ゼネレーション | 1983–1986 (vol.) | Published by Big Comics / Big Spirits Comics, 7 volumes | |
| Ah! My Mikan あ!Myみかん | 1983–1985 (vol.) | Published by Boys Big Comics, 6 volumes | |
| Onna Darake 女だらけ | 1975–1976 (vol.) | Published by Jump Comics, 7 volumes | |
| Tokyo BJ 東京BJ | 1975–1976 (vol.) | Published by Mr. Magazine KC, 6 volumes | |
| Aoki Hono 青き炎 | 1989–1991 (vol.) | Published by Young Sunday Comics, 6 volumes | |
| Otoko no Jigazō 男の自画像 | 1987–1988 (vol.) | Published by Big Comics, 6 volumes | |
| Shop Jibun; SHOP自分 | 1999–2001 (vol.) | Published by Big Comics, 6 volumes | |
| Tokumei Kakarichō Tadano Hitoshi Rookie Edition 特命係長只野仁 ルーキー編 | 2013–2016 (vol.) | Published by KPC, 6 volumes | |
| Tokumei Kakarichō Tadano Hitoshi Final 特命係長只野仁ファイナル | 2015–2017 (vol.) | Published by Bunkasha, 6 volumes | |
| The Dai shimin THE大市民 | 2003–2004 (vol.) | Published by Upper's KC, 5 volumes | |
| Fushidara na Face ふしだらなフェイス | 1994–1995 (vol.) | Published by Young Champion Comics, 5 volumes | |
| Aku no Hana 悪の華 | 2004–2005 (vol.) | Published by Mannan Q Comics, 5 volumes | |
| Shuniaka 朱に赤 | 1981–1982 (vol.) | Published by Boy Magazine Comics, 5 volumes | |
| Harajuku Fashion Monogatari 原宿ファッション物語 | 1990 (vol.) | Published by KC Special, 5 volumes | |
