= Disciples of Hippocrates =

- DVD cover
- Directed by: Kazuki Ōmori
- Written by: Kazuki Ōmori
- Produced by: Shiro Sasaki
- Starring: Masato Furuoya; Ran Itō; Akira Emoto; Yoshio Harada
- Cinematography: Yasuhiro Hotta
- Music by: Shūichi Chino
- Production companies: Cinema House; Art Theatre Guild
- Distributed by: Art Theatre Guild
- Release date: November 21, 1980 (Japan)
- Running time: 126 minutes
- Country: Japan
- Language: Japanese

Disciples of Hippocrates (Japanese: ヒポクラテスたち, Hepburn: Hipokuratesu-tachi) is a 1980 Japanese drama film written and directed by Kazuki Ōmori. The film stars Masato Furuoya as a medical student struggling with his final year of med school. It also stars Ran Itō, Akira Emoto and Yoshio Harada in supporting roles. Disciples of Hippocrates was co-produced and distributed by Art Theatre Guild, which released it on November 21, 1980, in Japan.

== Premise ==
Aisaku Ogino (Masato Furuoya), a medical student in his final year of studies, struggles to balance his politics and his romantic life with high-stress clinical training in a hospital. He begins to wonder if he is really suited for the medical profession.

== Cast ==
- Masato Furuoya as Aisaku Ogino
- Ran Itō as Midori Kimura
- Masahiro Mitsuta as Ichirō Kawamoto
- Tsutomu Kariba as Osamu Oshima
- Akira Emoto as Kenji Katō
- Yoshio Harada as Assistant Professor Tokumatsu
- Kai Atō as Yasukuni Kanzaki
- Fumio Watanabe as Seizaburō Kawamoto
- Moeko Ezawa as Owner of Kamo
- Shogo Kano as Keizo Takagi
- Kōjirō Kusanagi as Professor of Internal Medicine
- Kisako Makishi as Junko Nakahara
- Leo Morimoto as Photographer
- Teizō Muta as Toraichi Nakahara
- Takashi Naitō as Shintaro Minamida
- Masaya Nihei as Reporter
- Ichirō Ogura as Eiji Nishumura
- Ryujirō Oki as Psychosis Patient
- Yōsuke Saitō as Shunpei Honda
- Hajime Nishizuka as Wang Longming
- Kazue Tsunogae as Naoko Yoshikawa
- Shoji Murakami as Katsumi Yoshikawa
- Takuma Ikeuchi as Tsuyoshi Nakahara
- Yugo Miyazaki as Hideo Noguchi
- Yoshinobu Kaneko as Daisuke Watanabe
- Tsutomu Hatai as Dean of Medicine
- Osamu Kitayama as Radiology Lecturer
- Kenjō Haku as Muraka Assistant
- Osamu Tezuka as Professor of Pediatrics (special appearance)
- Seijun Suzuki as Phantom Thief (special appearance)

== Production ==
Director Ōmori was a former medical student himself, and he put some of his own experiences into the film's story.

== Release ==
Disciples of Hippocrates was released by Art Theatre Guild on November 21, 1980, in Japan. The film was later released on Blu-ray and DVD on May 13, 2015.

== Awards and nominations ==
2nd Yokohama Film Festival

- Won: Best Actor - Masato Furuoya
- Won: Best Supporting Actress - Ran Itō
- Best Ten List: 6th place

5th Hochi Film Awards

- Won: Best Actor - Masato Furuoya

54th Kinema Junpo Best Ten Awards

- Best Ten List: 3rd place
