= List of Japanese films of 1983 =

A list of films released in Japan in 1983 (see 1983 in film).

Title	Director	Cast	Genre	Notes
1983
Aesop's Fables	Norio Hikone		—N/a	Animated film
The Ballad of Narayama	Shohei Imamura	Ken Ogata; Sumiko Sakamoto	Drama	Japan Academy Prize for Best Film and Palme d'Or winner at Cannes
Barefoot Gen	Masaru Mori	Issei Miyazaki	Anime; War; Drama	
Detective Story				
Doraemon: Nobita and the Castle of the Undersea Devil	Tsutomu Shibayama	Nobuyo Ōyama	Anime	
Dynaman Movie	Shōhei Tōjo	Jyunichi Haruta; Sayoko Hagiwara	Sci-fi for Children	
The Family Game	Yoshimitsu Morita	Yūsaku Matsuda, Juzo Itami	Drama	
Female Cats	Shingo Yamashiro	Ai Saotome	Roman porno	
Hometown	Seijirō Kōyama			Entered into the 13th Moscow International Film Festival
Izakaya Choji				
Kandagawa Pervert Wars	Kiyoshi Kurosawa	Usagi Asō	Pink film	
Legend of the Eight Samurai	Kinji Fukasaku	Hiroko Yakushimaru; Hiroyuki Sanada	Samurai; Drama	
The Makioka Sisters	Kon Ichikawa	Sayuri Yoshinaga; Keiko Kishi; Yūko Kotegawa	Drama	
Meiso chizu				
Merry Christmas, Mr. Lawrence	Nagisa Oshima	David Bowie; Takeshi Kitano; Ryuichi Sakamoto	War	Entered into the 1983 Cannes Film Festival
Miyuki	Kazuyuki Izutsu		Anime	
Nankyoku Monogatari	Koreyoshi Kurahara	Ken Takakura; Tsunehiko Watase	Docufiction; Drama	Entered into the 34th Berlin International Film Festival
Rope and Breasts	Masaru Konuma	Nami Matsukawa	Roman porno	Matsukawa's farewell appearance as SM Queen
Toki o Kakeru Shōjo	Nobuhiko Obayashi	Tomoyo Harada	Romance; Sci-fi	
Tora-san Goes Religious?	Yoji Yamada	Kiyoshi Atsumi	Comedy	32nd in the Otoko wa Tsurai yo series
Tora-san's Song of Love	Yoji Yamada	Kiyoshi Atsumi	Comedy	31st in the Otoko wa Tsurai yo series
Urusei Yatsura: Only You	Mamoru Oshii	Fumi Hirano; Toshio Furukawa	Anime; Romantic comedy Science fiction	Mamoru Oshii's first feature film The first Urusei Yatsura film

== See also ==
- 1983 in Japan
- 1983 in Japanese television
