= Tokumei Kakarichō Tadano Hitoshi =

Japanese manga and television series

- Volume 11 in the Shin Tokumei Kakarichō Tadano Hitoshi manga series

特命係長·只野仁
- Genre: Action
- Manga
- Written by: Kimio Yanagisawa
- Published by: Kadokawa Shoten; Bunkasha
- Magazine: Weekly Gendai
- Original run: December 14, 2000 – June 15, 2001
- Volumes: 9
- Manga

Shin Tokumei Kakarichō Tadano Hitoshi
- Written by: Kimio Yanagisawa
- Published by: Kadokawa Shoten; Bunkasha
- Magazine: Weekly Gendai
- Original run: May 27, 2002 – October 25, 2007
- Volumes: 20
- Television drama
- Original network: TV Asahi
- Original run: July 4, 2003 – February 2, 2008

Tokumei Kakarichō Tadano Hitoshi (Japanese: 特命係長·只野仁; lit. "Mission Section Chief Hitoshi Tadano") is a Japanese manga series written and illustrated by Kimio Yanagisawa. A television drama aired on TV Asahi in 2003, The official English name of the drama is Hitoshi Tadano, the Extraordinary Undercover Detective. A new drama series started airing in 2012 under the title Detective Anonymous.

== Plot ==
Jin Tadano is an assistant manager at the Denoudo Corporation. To his coworkers, he appears ordinary and somewhat inept, but in reality he is a covert operative working under the company chairman, assigned to investigate and resolve corruption and other criminal activity affecting the company and its clients.

Throughout the series, he maintains his ordinary office persona while carrying out undercover missions involving fraud, kidnapping, murder, and other crimes. In the television series, he has a partner, Moriwaki, whereas in the original manga, he works alone.

== Manga volumes ==
There are two series: Tokumei Kakarichō Tadano Hitoshi (9 volumes, or tankōbon, published from December 14, 2000 to June 15, 2001) and Shin Tokumei Kakarichō Tadano Hitoshi (20 volumes, published from May 27, 2002 to October 25, 2007). They were published by Kadokawa Shoten and Bunkasha and were serialized in Weekly Gendai, a weekly manga magazine targeting salarymen.

- Tokumei Kakarichō Tadano Hitoshi 1, ISBN 4-8211-9852-5
- Tokumei Kakarichō Tadano Hitoshi 2, ISBN 4-8211-9853-3
- Tokumei Kakarichō Tadano Hitoshi 3, ISBN 4-8211-9856-8
- Tokumei Kakarichō Tadano Hitoshi 4, ISBN 4-8211-9858-4
- Tokumei Kakarichō Tadano Hitoshi 5, ISBN 4-8211-9864-9
- Tokumei Kakarichō Tadano Hitoshi 6, ISBN 4-8211-9874-6
- Tokumei Kakarichō Tadano Hitoshi 7, ISBN 4-8211-9875-4
- Tokumei Kakarichō Tadano Hitoshi 8, ISBN 4-8211-9883-5
- Tokumei Kakarichō Tadano Hitoshi 9, ISBN 4-8211-9884-3
- Shin Tokumei Kakarichō Tadano Hitoshi 1, ISBN 4-8211-9952-1
- Shin Tokumei Kakarichō Tadano Hitoshi 2, ISBN 4-8211-9953-X
- Shin Tokumei Kakarichō Tadano Hitoshi 3, ISBN 4-8211-9974-2
- Shin Tokumei Kakarichō Tadano Hitoshi 4, ISBN 4-8211-8006-5
- Shin Tokumei Kakarichō Tadano Hitoshi 5, ISBN 4-8211-8075-8
- Shin Tokumei Kakarichō Tadano Hitoshi 6, ISBN 4-8211-8099-5
- Shin Tokumei Kakarichō Tadano Hitoshi 7, ISBN 4-8211-8112-6

== TV drama ==
The first TV series was broadcast on TV Asahi's "Friday Night Drama" slot from July 4, 2003, until September 19, 2003, and garnered an average rating of 12.0%, reaching a high point of 14.1% according to the Kantō Area Video Research group, the highest rating of any show in the "Friday Night Drama" slot. During the final episode of the first series, viewers were told that Tadano and Moriwaki would take a 15-month vacation traveling around various onsen across Japan. A special titled Tokumei Kakarichō Tadano Hitoshi Returns aired on December 22, 2004, just over 15 months since the final episode of the first series.

On January 14, 2005, the second series began airing, running through March 18, 2005. According to the Kantō Area Video Research group, the series achieved a 16.0% rating for the episodes airing on February 11 and 18. The final episode garnered a rating of over 20% in its timeslot, due largely to the main character, Tadano, collapsing during the episode from being overworked. On August 7, 2005, the second special aired, titled Nerawareta Serebu na Onna-tachi. The special garnered a 19.3% rating, the second highest rating ever for a drama, making it the most popular drama aired between August 1 and 7.

The third series began airing on January 12, 2007.

While in the original manga Tadano is a "lone wolf", in the TV series he works in combination with Moriwaki, a character created for the TV series. Moriwaki has since appeared in the original manga.

Based on a comic by Kimio Yanagisawa, Tokumei Kakarichō Tadano Hitoshi is a story about a salaried worker who leads a double life as inept manager at the company but moonlights as a heavy for the company chairman, investigating corruption within and outside of the company.

Jin Tadano (Katsunori Takahashi) is an assistant manager of operations department. Most people call him Hitoshi Tadano because Jin can be read as Hitoshi, which rhymes with Tadano Hito (meaning "an ordinary person"). He pretends to be a useless employee to conceal his true role within the company. He is like a ninja working for the chairman of the Denoudo Corporation, always on secret assignments to protect the people and the projects the company is involved with. He is looked down on by most of his fellow employees as useless oaf, but a few girls like him for who he is. This includes the chairman's secretary Noriko Tsubouchi (Atsuko Sakurai), TV broadcaster Mayuko Shinmizu (Rieko Miura), and his coworker Kazue Yamabuki (Yuri Ebihara).

In each episode, he becomes involved in solving corruption, murder, kidnapping, and other issues affecting the company and its clients. The program is made for an adult audience and was aired during a late-night time slot. The themes and characters that appear in the story reflect this.
