= 1981 in Japan =

- Decades: 1960s; 1970s; 1980s; 1990s; 2000s
- See also: Other events of 1981; History of Japan • Timeline • Years

Events in the year 1981 in Japan. It corresponds to Shōwa 56 (昭和56年) in the Japanese calendar.

Demographically, Japanese Millennial Generation is the fourth youngest Japanese demographic cohort, which approximately born between 1981 and 1993. Also known as Japanese Millennials, who offered to coming of age during a time of rapid technological advancement and the rise of internet and social media, this fourth youngest generation has a deep understanding of digital world. After three different youngest generations, Japanese Millennials are corresponding to global Millennials/Generation Y (roughly 1981–1996), and is also often referred to the commonly separation into two different subgroups, such as Pressure Generation (1981–1986) and Yutori Generation (1987–1993), which broadly align with proposed a birth year ranges, although the specific names and date ranges for these subgroups can be vary by source and are often tied to specific local economic or educational shifts. Japanese Millennials are "sober", "realistic", and "internally", which focused on this generation, whose values represent a significant departure from "work hard, spend big" mentality of their bubble-era parents.

== Incumbents ==
- Emperor: Hirohito (Emperor Shōwa)
- Prime Minister: Zenko Suzuki (L–Iwate)
- Chief Cabinet Secretary: Kiichi Miyazawa (L–Hiroshima)
- Chief Justice of the Supreme Court: Takaaki Hattori
- President of the House of Representatives: Hajime Fukuda (L–Fukui)
- President of the House of Councillors: Masatoshi Tokunaga (L–national)
- Diet sessions: 94th (regular session opened in December 1980, to June 6), 95th (extraordinary, September 24 to November 28), 96th (regular, December 21 to 1982, August 21)

=== Governors ===
- Aichi Prefecture: Yoshiaki Nakaya
- Akita Prefecture: Kikuji Sasaki
- Aomori Prefecture: Masaya Kitamura
- Chiba Prefecture: Kiichi Kawakami (until 27 February); Takeshi Numata (starting 4 April)
- Ehime Prefecture: Haruki Shiraishi
- Fukui Prefecture: Heidayū Nakagawa
- Fukuoka Prefecture: Hikaru Kamei
- Fukushima Prefecture: Isao Matsudaira
- Gifu Prefecture: Yosuke Uematsu
- Gunma Prefecture: Ichiro Shimizu
- Hiroshima Prefecture: Hiroshi Miyazawa (until 29 October); Toranosuke Takeshita (starting 29 October)
- Hokkaido: Naohiro Dōgakinai
- Hyogo Prefecture: Tokitada Sakai
- Ibaraki Prefecture: Fujio Takeuchi
- Ishikawa Prefecture: Yōichi Nakanishi
- Iwate Prefecture: Tadashi Nakamura
- Kagawa Prefecture: Tadao Maekawa
- Kagoshima Prefecture: Kaname Kamada
- Kanagawa Prefecture: Kazuji Nagasu
- Kochi Prefecture: Chikara Nakauchi
- Kumamoto Prefecture: Issei Sawada
- Kyoto Prefecture: Yukio Hayashida
- Mie Prefecture: Ryōzō Tagawa
- Miyagi Prefecture: Sōichirō Yamamoto
- Miyazaki Prefecture: Suketaka Matsukata
- Nagano Prefecture: Gorō Yoshimura
- Nagasaki Prefecture: Kan'ichi Kubo
- Nara Prefecture: Shigekiyo Ueda
- Niigata Prefecture: Takeo Kimi
- Oita Prefecture: Morihiko Hiramatsu
- Okayama Prefecture: Shiro Nagano
- Okinawa Prefecture: Junji Nishime
- Osaka Prefecture: Sakae Kishi
- Saga Prefecture: Kumao Katsuki
- Saitama Prefecture: Yawara Hata
- Shiga Prefecture: Masayoshi Takemura
- Shiname Prefecture: Seiji Tsunematsu
- Shizuoka Prefecture: Keizaburō Yamamoto
- Tochigi Prefecture: Yuzuru Funada
- Tokushima Prefecture: Yasunobu Takeichi (until 4 October); Shinzo Miki (starting 5 October)
- Tokyo: Shun'ichi Suzuki
- Tottori Prefecture: Kōzō Hirabayashi
- Toyama Prefecture: Yutaka Nakaoki
- Wakayama Prefecture: Shirō Kariya
- Yamagata Prefecture: Seiichirō Itagaki
- Yamaguchi Prefecture: Toru Hirai
- Yamanashi Prefecture: Kōmei Mochizuki

== Events ==
- January to March – A heavy massive snowfall with avalanche hit around Japan, according to Japan Fire and Disaster Management Agency confirmed report, 152 peoples lost their lives, 2,158 peoples were wounded.
- March 31 – Pink Lady performs their farewell concert in the same stadium where Candies performed their concert 3 years earlier.
- July 9 – Donkey Kong is released, marking the first Donkey Kong and Mario smash hit arcade game developed by Nintendo.
- October 10 – Ministry of Education issues jōyō kanji.
- October 16 – Gas explosions at a coal mine in Hokutan, Yūbari, Hokkaido kill 93.
- The first fully Automated guideway transit driverless people mover train technology in the world, introduced on Port Island Line, Kobe.

== Popular culture ==
=== Arts and entertainment ===
In film, Station by Yasuo Furuhata won the Best film award at the Japan Academy Prize, Enrai by Kichitaro Negishi won Best film at the Hochi Film Awards, Muddy River by Kōhei Oguri won Best film at the Blue Ribbon Awards and Something Like It by Yoshimitsu Morita won Best film at the Yokohama Film Festival. The coming of age yakuza thriller Sailor Suit and Machine Gun was the most successful movie of that year, turning the idol Hiroko Yakushimaru into the youngest and best paid actress of the moment. For a list of Japanese films released in 1981 see Japanese films of 1981.

In manga, the winners of the Shogakukan Manga Award were Sunset on Third Street by Ryōhei Saigan (general), Dr. Slump by Akira Toriyama (shōnen or shōjo) and Doraemon by Fujiko Fujio (children). Sanshirō of 1, 2 by Makoto Kobayashi (shōnen) and Ohayō! Spank by Shun'ichi Yukimuro and Shizue Takanashi (shōjo) won the Kodansha Manga Award. Kibun wa mou sensou by Katsuhiro Otomo won the Seiun Award for Best Comic of the Year. For a list of manga released in 1981 see Category:1981 manga.

In music, the 32nd Kōhaku Uta Gassen was won by the White Team (men). Akira Terao won the FNS Music Festival. For other music in 1981, see 1981 in Japanese music.

In television, see: 1981 in Japanese television.

In radio, Japan FM Network, Japan's biggest FM radio network, was established in May 1981.

=== Sports ===
In athletics, Japan hosted the 1981 Asian Athletics Championships where it ranked 1st with 18 gold medals.

In football (soccer), Japan hosted the 1981 Intercontinental Cup. Fujita Engineering won the Japan Soccer League. For the champions of the regional leagues see: 1981 Japanese Regional Leagues.

In tennis, Japan hosted the Federation Cup, won by the United States.

== Births ==
- January 4: Hitomi Sakamoto, wrestler (d. 2025)
- January 6: Rinko Kikuchi, actress
- January 10: Kumiko Ikeda, long jumper
- January 14: Chiharu Niiyama, actress and model
- January 18: Naoyuki Daigo, athlete
- February 10: Yasuyuki Muneta, judoka
- February 21: Jun Kaname, actor
- March 6
  - Masakazu Fujiwara, long-distance runner
  - Mizuki Watanabe, J-pop and rock singer
- March 18: Shohei Tateyama, former professional baseball pitcher
- March 23: Takeshi Honda, figure skater
- March 31: Ryōko Shintani, voice actress and singer
- April 7: Kazuki Watanabe, musician (d. 2000)
- April 14: Shinjiro Koizumi, politician
- April 18: Mai Hoshimura, musician
- April 19: Kazuhiro Maeda, long-distance runner
- April 23: Megu Hirose, softball player
- May 8: Yasuko Tajima, medley swimmer
- May 12: Naohiro Ishikawa, footballer
- May 13: Hidenori Kato, footballer
- May 22: Fumina Hara, actress and idol
- May 23: Ema Tōyama, manga artist
- May 24: Sayaka Ando, gravure idol
- June 6: Daisuke Miyazaki, handball player
- June 8: Ai Nonaka, voice actress
- June 16: Jun Mihara, football referee
- June 18: Yurin, actress, voice actress and singer
- July 27: Mari Hoshino, actress and singer
- August 4: Ayumi Tanimoto, judoka
- August 5: Kou Shibasaki, singer and actress
- August 10: Natsumi Abe, singer and actress
- August 15: Yoshiko Fujinaga, long-distance runner
- August 28: Aira Yuhki, J-pop singer
- September 19: Rika Fujiwara, tennis player
- September 22: Hiromitsu Miura, Boxer and former mixed martial artist
- September 23: Hiroka Yaginuma, wrestler
- September 26
  - Asuka, wrestler
  - Marica Hase, gravure model and pornographic actress
- October 6: Chiharu Icho, wrestler
- October 8: Ryuji Sainei, actor
- October 17: Tsubasa Imai, singer, actor, and dancer
- October 25: Hiroshi Aoyama, motorcycle road racer
- October 30
  - Ayaka Kimura, actress and J-pop singer
  - Eri Sendai, voice actress
- November 3: Ayako Shoda, wrestler
- November 7
  - Nana Katase, actress
  - Rina Uchiyama, actress and idol
- December 8: Naoyuki Kotani, mixed martial artist
- December 19: Eriko Sato, actress and model
- December 29: Shizuka Arakawa, figure skater

== Deaths ==
- January 8: Shigeru Egami, master of Shotokan karate
- February 11: Fusae Ichikawa, feminist, politician and women's suffrage leader
- February 25: Gunichi Mikawa, Vice-Admiral in the Imperial Japanese Navy
- April 9: Ichiro Nakayama, economist
- April 12: Prince Asaka Yasuhiko, founder of a collateral branch of the Japanese imperial family
- April 27: Koji Sone, judoka
- May 7: Hiromichi Yahara, senior staff officer
- July 4: Isao Kimura, actor
- July 19: Daisuke Itō, film director and screenwriter
- July 23: Kazuo Taoka, one of the yakuza Godfathers
- August 22: Kuniko Mukōda, screenwriter (b. 1929)
- September 8: Hideki Yukawa, physicist
- September 14: Yasuji Kiyose, composer
- September 16: Akira Iwasaki, film critic, historian, and producer
- December 28: Seishi Yokomizo, author

== See also ==
- 1981 in Japanese television
- List of Japanese films of 1981
