= Ayako Ito =

Japanese announcer

- 伊藤 綾子
- Born: 23 December 1980 (age 44); Hiroomote, Akita, Akita, Japan
- Education: Yamagata University Faculty of Education
- Years active: 2003–2018
- Agent: Cent Force
- Notable work: Toshio Suzuki no Ghibli Ase-mamire; Genki Mantan Akita win 2
- Style: Informal programmes
- Television: News Real Time akita
- Height: 1.62 m (5 ft 4 in)
- Website: Official profile

Ayako Ito (伊藤 綾子, Itō Ayako, born 23 December 1980, in Akita, Akita, Japan) is a former Japanese television and radio announcer who was represented with Cent Force.

== Current appearances ==
=== TV programmes ===
Year	Title	Network	Notes	Ref.
2010	news every.	NTV	"culture & sports", "Ki ni naru!", "Kyō Kore" main caster; Friday appearances	

=== Radio ===
Year	Title	Network	Notes
	Toshio Suzuki no Ghibli Ase-mamire	FM Tokyo	Narration
2016	Ayako Ito Madobe de Branch	FM Tokyo	

== Former appearances ==
As an Akita Broadcasting System announcer

Year	Title	Notes	Ref.
	Lunch Request		
	Yanmā no minna no Sora	Weather forecaster	
	Hokuto furusato Roman: Tsutaetai Mirai Isan	Narration	
	Ji Digi Information		
2004	Genki Mantan Akita win 2		
2006	News Real Time akita	Caster	

As a free announcer

Year	Title	Network	Notes	Ref.
2007	NNN News Real Time	NTV		
2010	Sunday Present–Geinō-kai! Kazoku Taikō: Kahō no Recipe	TV Asahi	Co-presented with Koji Imada	
2010	Sugoi Kaigi!	TV Tokyo	Assistant	
2010	Keirin Grand Prix 2010: Shōkin 1 Oku-en wa Dare no Te ni!?	NTV	Presenter	
2011	Bla Mayo no Jitensha-ō Kettei-sen	NTV	Presenter	
2013	WOWOW Haru no Muryō Hōsō: Mankai! Nippon no Katayaburi!	WOWOW	Co-presented with Maya Kobayashi	
2013	Kagayaki Yell!	NTV	Narration	

== Others ==
=== Stage ===
Year	Title	Notes
2008	Cent Force Presents: Seasons	Cent Force female caster reading drama

=== Books ===
Year	Title	Ref.
2007	News no Muse-tachi	
2010	Genshoku Bijin Caster Daizukan	
2012	Uchi no Tama Shirimasen ka?	
2015	Minna no Shitteru Ito-san, minna no Shiranai Ayako-san	

=== Magazines ===
Title	Issue	Notes
Shūkan Bunshun	17, 24 August 2006	Merger issue
Circus	February 2008 and April 2010	
Afro	4 September 2008	
Spirits	29 September 2008	Convenience store limited-appendix photos
An an	22 Jul 2009	

=== Serials ===
Year	Title
2010	Circus "Ayako Ito no Manner Renshūchō"

=== DVD ===
Title
Ayako Ito SOL: Jōnetsu no Flamenco

=== Advertisements ===
Title
Akita Ken Kokumin Kenkōhoken Dantai Rengō-kai
