= Sosuke Sumitani =

Japanese television announcer (born 1980)

Sōsuke Sumitani (炭谷 宗佑 Sumitani Sōsuke, January 14, 1980 in Tokyo) is a Japanese announcer for Nippon Television. He was known for his good looks and was the sports announcer on various shows, slowly becoming a household name. Sumitani graduated from the Department of Economics at Keio University.
