= Onna no Hosomichi: Nureta Kaikyo =

- DVD cover
- Directed by: Kazunari Takeda
- Starring: Miyako Yamaguchi; Megumi Ogawa; Kan Mikami; Kōjirō Kusanagi; Renji Ishibashi
- Release date: 12 April 1980 (Japan)
- Running time: 71 minutes
- Country: Japan
- Language: Japanese

Onna no Hosomichi: Nureta Kaikyo (Japanese: おんなの細道・濡れた海峡), also known as Woman's Trail: Wet Path, is a 1980 Japanese erotic drama film directed by Kazunari Takeda. It was released on 12 April 1980.

== Cast ==
- Miyako Yamaguchi
- Megumi Ogawa
- Kan Mikami
- Kōjirō Kusanagi
- Renji Ishibashi

== Reception ==
It was chosen as the 7th best film at the 2nd Yokohama Film Festival.
