= Haruko Tachiiri =

Japanese manga artist (born 1949)

Haruko Tachiiri (たちいり ハルコ, Tachīri Haruko) (born 7 May 1949 in Meguro, Tokyo, Japan) is a Japanese manga artist who writes mostly manga for children. In 1979, she received an Excellence Prize from the Japanese Cartoonists' Association for Picola-picola, and in 1984 she received the Shogakukan Manga Award for children's manga for Panku Ponk.
