= Nozomi Takeuchi =

Japanese actress (born 1980)

- Born: June 25, 1980 (age 44); Okazaki, Aichi, Japan
- Height: 1.58 m (5 ft 2 in)
- Website: www.yume-k.com/profile/takeuchi.html

Nozomi Takeuchi (竹内のぞみ/竹内希実, Takeuchi Nozomi, born June 25, 1980) is a Japanese gravure idol, and a female talent. She is from Okazaki, Aichi, belonged to the show-business production Yume Kikaku. Her nickname is 'Kojocho' (means a factory manager), derives from her handle name of the official blog. She graduated from 'Kunitachi College of Music' (in Japan), and plays the piano.

== Bibliography ==
=== Photobooks ===
1. affettuoso 愛情をこめて, Bunkasha 2003
2. N-102, Bauhaus 2004
3. Crescendo (クレッシェンド), Saibunkan 2004

== Filmography ==
=== Image Videos ===
1. Sweet Fairy, Bauhaus 2004
2. Exclamation [102cm爆乳], Com Alliance 2004
3. 102, Takeshobo 2004
4. Itoshi Karada (イトオシイカラダ / The Coquettish Body), Line Communications 2004
5. I wish..., Takeshobo 2005
6. Mangetsu (満月 / Full Moon), Line Communications 2005
7. Akatsuki no Megami (暁の女神 / The Goddess of Daybreak), 2005
8. SELENA 月の女神, 2005
9. Koibito Kibun (恋人気分 / Lover's Feeling), 2006
10. Special DVD-BOX, 2006
11. π, 2006
12. Anata Iro (あなた色 / Your Color), 2006
13. Venus Bi No Megami (Venus 美の女神), 2006
14. Mizukake Matsuri Songkran (水かけ祭り~ソンクラン~ / Water Soak Festival Songkran), 2006
15. Tomadoi (とまどい / Confusion), 2007
16. Mikkai (密会 / Secret Meeting), 2007
17. Itoshi No Catherine (愛しのカトリーヌ / Catherine of Lovely), 2007
18. OH! Pai Homare (OH! パイ誉れ), 2007
19. OH! Pai Odori (OH! パイ踊り), 2007
20. Natural posture, 2008
21. Killer Body, 2008

=== Stage dramas ===
- Ginza Roman (銀座ロマン / A Romance at Ginza), 2005
- Hoshi no Ohimesama (星のお姫さま / A Princess of the Star), 2005
- Tengoku Byoto (天国病棟 / The Heaven's Ward), 2006
- I my me, 2006
- no emotion, 2007

=== TV programs ===
- Boku no Ikiru Michi - episode 7 (僕の生きる道 第7話), Fuji TV 2003
- Waterboys - episode 2 (ウォーターボーイ 第2話), Fuji TV 2003
- Akiba Limousine (秋葉りむじん), TV Tokyo 2003
- Odaiba Akashi Jo -GOLDEN- (お台場明石城 -GOLDEN-), Fuji TV, 2004
- Tokoro & Osugi no Tohoho Jinbutsuden (所&おすぎのトホホ人物伝), TV Tokyo 2005
- Joyu Damashi (女優魂), NTV 2005
- Kitano Talent Meikan (北野タレント名鑑), Fuji TV 2006
- Nep Vegas (ネプベガス), TBS 2006
- Keiji Muto's Sports Daihyakka (武藤敬司のスポーツ大百科), Tokai TV 2006
- Communi-TV Netsujo Hoso (コミュニTV 熱情放送), CATV 2007

=== V-Cinema ===
- Shura no Michi (修羅の道 / The Long and Winding Road), 2003

== Discography ==
=== Songs ===
All of her songs were sung in the Japanese language.

==== Singles ====
1. Dolce (ドルチェ), Prism Note Inc. 2006
2. Fuyu ga Hajimaruyo (冬がはじまるよ), Avex Marketing 2007

=== Radio programs ===
- Hideaki Ota & Nozomi Takeuchi: Playful Spirits Club (太田英明・竹内のぞみ アソブココロ倶楽部), 17:15-17:30 on every Saturdays from October 2005 to March 2007
