= Panku Ponk =

Japanese manga series

パンク・ポンク
- Genre: Adventure, Comedy
- Manga
- Written by: Haruko Tachiiri
- Published by: Shogakukan
- English publisher: NA: Studio Ironcat
- Magazine: Shougaku Sannensei, Shougaku Yonnensei, Shougaku Gonensei
- Original run: 1976 – 1991
- Volumes: 12

Panku Ponk (パンク・ポンク, Panku Ponku) is a Japanese children's comedy manga series written and illustrated by Haruko Tachiiri. It began serialization in the December 1976 issue of the Shogakukan magazine Third Grade of Elementary School (小学三年生, Shougaku Sannensei); as the characters aged, it moved to Fourth Grade of Elementary School (小学四年生, Shougaku Yonnensei), Fifth Grade of Elementary School (小学五年生, Shougaku Gonensei), and the shōjo manga magazine Hop, before concluding in 1991.

Serial numbers were very short, usually no more than four pages, and were collected in a total of 12 bound volumes under Shogakukan's Ladybird Comics imprint. It was followed by two sequel series, Panku Ponkuserekushon (パンク・ポンクセレクション), collected in two volumes, and Panku Ponk: Color Version (カラー版パンク・ポンク, Karaa Ban Panku Ponku). Panku Ponk received the 1984 Shogakukan Manga Award for the children's category. It was licensed in English in North America by Studio Ironcat before they eventually went out of business.

== Characters ==
- Panku Ponk (パンク・ポンク, Panku Ponku) is the protagonist of the series. He is an oversized rabbit, big enough to be mistaken for a pig. He is Bonnie's mischievous pet who likes to eat carrots.
- Bonnie (ボニー, Bonii) is the leader of the punk girls at elementary school, with a fondness for fighting. She has a habit of eating snacks at lunch, even though this upsets her stomach.
- Mark (マーク, Māku) is Bonnie's boyfriend and a talented inventor. However, he is usually teased by Bonnie and her group, making his personality change erratically.
- Honey (ハニー, Hanii) is Bonnie's mother. She is a full-time housewife with a talent for housework. She frequently has to reprimand Bonnie when she gets a zero on tests.
- Tony (トニー, Tonii) is Bonnie's father. He is a senior post office worker and a heavy smoker.
- Chamo (チャーモ, Chāmo) is a giant hamster who escapes his alcoholic, bachelor owner to follow Panku around.
- Gokiburiinu-chan (ゴキブリーヌちゃん) is Chamo's girlfriend. She has a friendly personality and aims to be a hairdresser.
- Doctor Mambo (ドクトルマンボ, Dokutoru Manbo) is the owner of the town's pediatric hospital. He is nicknamed "Mambo" because of his fondness for the mambo dance.
