= Kōjirō Kusanagi =

Japanese actor (1929–2007)

- 草薙幸二郎; Kusanagi Kōjirō
- Born: September 19, 1929; Kita-ku, Tokyo, Japan
- Died: November 11, 2007 (aged 78)
- Occupation: Actor

Kōjirō Kusanagi (草薙幸二郎, Kusanagi Kōjirō; September 19, 1929 – November 11, 2007) was a Japanese actor.

== Biography ==
He began acting at the Yoshi Hijikatas theatre Company after dropping out of Nihon University. Kusanagi made his film debut in 1953 in Yoake Mae directed by Kōzaburō Yoshimura. In 1956, he starred in Darkness at Noon, which was based on the true story of an innocent man arrested, tried and executed for a crime he didn't commit. Kusanagi appeared in over 40 films, mostly in supporting roles, in films such as Alone on the Pacific, The Sun, Bee Bop High School, and The Man Who Stole the Sun.

Kusanagi died of pneumonia on November 11, 2007, aged 78.

== Selected filmography ==
=== Film ===
- Darkness at Noon (Mahiru no ankoku) (1956)
- Kurenai no Kenju (1961) – Chen
- Alone on the Pacific, also known as Alone Across the Pacific (1963)
- The Long Death (1964) – Morita
- Kaerazaru hibi (1978)
- Taiyō o Nusunda Otoko, also known as The Man Who Stole the Sun (1979)
- Onna no Hosomichi: Nureta Kaikyo (1980)
- The Last Hero (1982)
- Itazu Kuma (1987)
- Umi e, See You (1988)
- Tōki Rakujitsu (1992)
- Madadayo (1993)
- Utatama (2008)

=== Television ===
- Taiga dramas
  - Ryōma ga Yuku (1968), Kiyokawa Hachirō
  - Momi no Ki wa Nokotta (1970), Shirōemon
  - Haru no Sakamichi (1971), Konishi Yukinaga
  - Shin Heike Monogatari (1972)
  - Katsu Kaishū (1974)
  - Genroku Taiheiki (1975)
  - Kashin (1977)
  - Kusa Moeru (1979)
  - Oretachi wa Tenshi da! (1979),Jiro Murata Episode7
  - Tōge no Gunzō (1982)
  - Taiheiki (1991)
  - Homura Tatsu (1993)
  - Hana no Ran (1994)
  - Mōri Motonari (1997), Kikkawa Kunitsune
- Ultraman Taro (1973)
- Naruto Hichō (1977–78)
- Tokyo Megure Keishi (1978)
- Sanada Taiheiki (1985–86), Oda Nobukatsu
- Kumokiri Nizaemon (1995)
- Gokenin Zankurō (1997)

== Awards ==
Year	Award	Category	Work(s)	Result
1956	1st Elan d'or Awards	Newcomer of the Year	Himself	Won
