= Tonda Couple =

Japanese manga series by Kimio Yanagisawa

翔んだカップル (Tonda Kappuru)
- Manga
- Written by: Kimio Yanagisawa
- Published by: Kodansha
- Magazine: Weekly Shōnen Magazine
- Original run: March 19, 1978 – March 11, 1981
- Volumes: 15
- Live-action film
- Directed by: Shinji Sōmai
- Written by: Shōichi Maruyama
- Released: July 26, 1980

Tonda Couple (Japanese: 翔んだカップル, Hepburn: Tonda Kappuru; "Soaring Couple") is a Japanese manga series by Kimio Yanagisawa. It won the 1979 Kodansha Manga Award for shōnen. It was adapted into a 1980 film directed by Shinji Sōmai and starring Shingo Tsurumi and Hiroko Yakushimaru.

== Cast ==
- Shingo Tsurumi
- Hiroko Yakushimaru
- Toshinori Omi
- Mariko Ishihara
- Hiroshi Madoka
- Hiroyuki Sanada
- Mieko Harada

== Awards ==
3rd Kodansha Manga Award

- Won: Shōnen

2nd Yokohama Film Festival

- Won: Best Actress - Hiroko Yakushimaru
- Won: Best New Director - Shinji Sōmai
- Won: Best Screenplay - Shōichi Maruyama
- 2nd Best Film
