= Kazuki Ōmori =

Japanese film director (1952–2022)

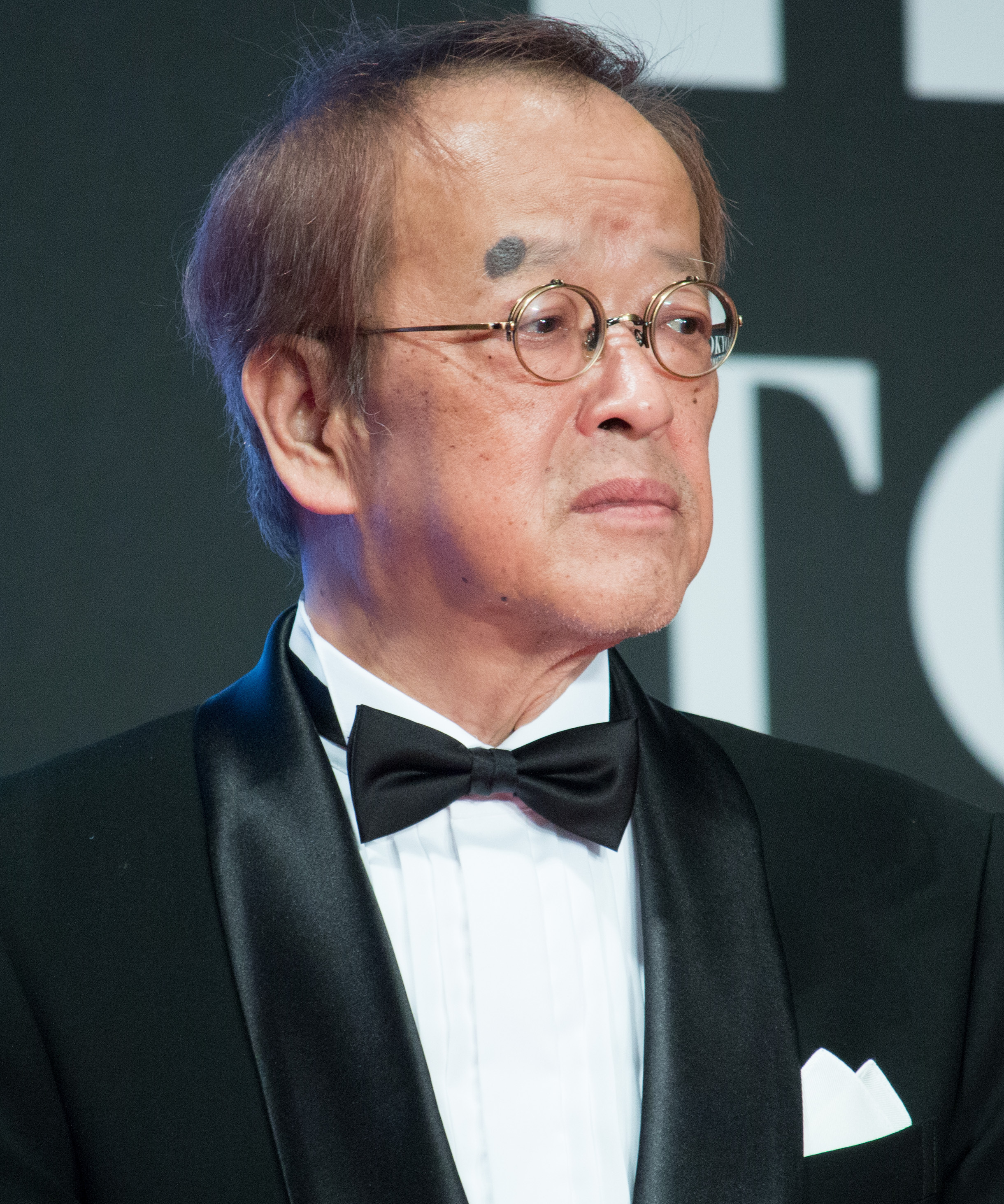
- Ōmori in 2015
- Born: 3 March 1952; Osaka, Japan
- Died: 12 November 2022 (aged 70)
- Occupations: Film director and screenwriter
- Website: (in Japanese) Firstwood Entertainment Inc.

Kazuki Ōmori (大森 一樹, Ōmori Kazuki; 3 March 1952 – 12 November 2022) was a Japanese film director and screenwriter.

== Career ==
Born in Osaka, Ōmori studied at Kyoto Prefectural University of Medicine and held a license to practice medicine. While in school, he began making films independently, with Kuraku naru made matenai! (1975), which featured Seijun Suzuki, receiving particularly high praise. His script "Orenji rōdo kyūkō" won the 3rd Kido Award for screenplays in 1977, and the next year he was able to film that in his professional debut. Several of his films, such as the 1980 Hipokuratesu-tachi, feature doctors or rely on his knowledge of medicine. He has worked in a variety of genres, including suspense films, musicals, and most famously abroad, several contributions to the Heisei Godzilla series.

Ōmori also participated in the formation of Director's Company in 1982, an independent production company founded by nine directors, including Kiyoshi Kurosawa, Sōgo Ishii, Shinji Sōmai, and Kazuhiko Hasegawa. In 2000, he became a professor at Osaka Electro-Communication University, and in 2005, a professor at Osaka University of Arts. He was also a special guest at G-Fest XIII in 2006.

== Personal life and death ==
Ōmori died from acute myeloid leukemia on 12 November 2022, at the age of 70.

== Filmography ==
=== Film and television ===
Year	Title	Director	Writer	Notes
1969	Kakumeikyou jidai	Yes	Yes	
1969	Shinuniwa mada hayai	Yes	Yes	
1972	Soratobu enban o mita otoko	Yes	Yes	
1972	Hiroshima kara tooku hanarete	Yes		Short film
1972	Asunimukattehashire nai!	Yes	Yes	
1974	Shinu ni wa ma ni awanai!	Yes	Yes	
1975	Kuraku naru-made matenai!	Yes	Yes	
1978	Orenji Rodo kyuko	Yes	Yes	
1978	A Long Goodbye to Natsuko	Yes	Yes	
1980	Disciples of Hippocrates	Yes	Yes	
1981	Zenritsusen no byoki to yobo	Yes	Yes	Documentary film
1981	Nyouro Kesseki to bishou happa	Yes	Yes	Documentary film
1982	Kaze no uta o kike	Yes	Yes	
1984	Sukanpin walk	Yes		
1985	You Gotta Chance	Yes		
1985	Houigaku kyoshitsu no gogo	Yes	Yes	TV film
1985	Sore ike! Zukkoke sanningumi	Yes		Anime TV series
1986	Koisuru Onnatachi	Yes	Yes	
1986	Take It Easy	Yes		
1986	Houigaku kyoshitsu no nagai ichinichi	Yes	Yes	TV film
1987	Totto Channel	Yes	Yes	
1987	Sayonara no onnatachi	Yes	Yes	
1988	Yojo no jidai		Yes	
1988	Joyuu jidai	Yes	Yes	Yomiuri TV 30th anniversary movie
1989	Hana no Furu Gogo	Yes	Yes	
1989	Godzilla vs. Biollante	Yes	Yes	
1990	Boku ga byoki ni natta wake	Yes	Yes	Episode 02
1990	Boku ga Isha o Yameta Riyu		Yes	TV series
1991	Mangetsu: Mr. Moonlight	Yes	Yes	
1991	Godzilla vs. King Ghidorah	Yes	Yes	
1992	Godzilla vs. Mothra		Yes	
1992	Keisho sakazuki	Yes		
1992	Mezase! Kinmedaru Yamaguchi Kaori Monogatari	Yes		TV film
1992	Mezase! Kinmedaru Shin Yamaguchi Kaori Monogatari	Yes		TV film
1994	Shoot!	Yes		
1995	Dai shitsuren	Yes		
1995	Emergency Call	Yes	Yes	
1995	Honō no ryōri hito shū tomitoku monogatari	Yes		TV film
1995	Godzilla vs. Destoroyah		Yes	
1996	Waga kokoro no ginga tetsudo: Miyazawa Kenji no monogatari	Yes		
1997	Dorimu sutajiamu	Yes		
1998	June Bride	Yes	Yes	
1999	Akarukunarumade kono koi o	Yes	Yes	Short film
2000	The Boy Who Saw the Wind	Yes	Yes	
2000	Hakata Movie: Chinchiromai	Yes	Yes	
2000	Natu: Odoru! Ninja densetsu	Yes	Yes	
2001	Saiaku	Yes		TV film
2001	Hashire! Ichiro	Yes	Yes	
2003	T.R.Y.	Yes		
2005	Chousei Kantai Sazer-X the Movie: Fight! Star Warriors	Yes		
2005	The Superdry Films	Yes		
2006	Kanasiki tenshi	Yes	Yes	
2007	Kuroi haru	Yes		TV film
2008	Za shôto fuirumuzu: Minna, hajime wa kodomo datta	Yes		Segment: Yesterday Once More
2008	Sora e: Sukui no tsubasa resukyû uingusu		Yes	
2011	Sekai no dokonidemo aru basho	Yes	Yes	
2011	Tsugaru hyakunen shokudou	Yes	Yes	
2014	Gunbot		Yes	4 episodes
2015	Betonamu no kaze ni fukarete	Yes	Yes	
