= Sadaaki Akamatsu =

Japanese flying ace (died 1980)

- 赤松 貞明
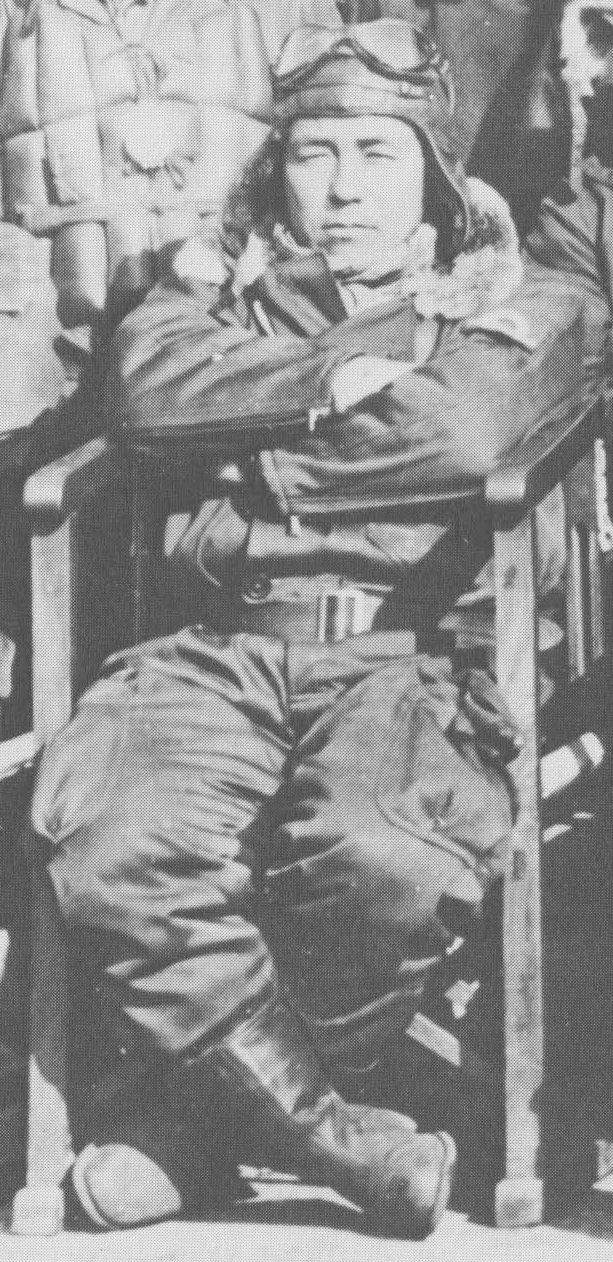
- Akamatsu photographed in 1944 or 1945 with the 302 Air Group at Atsugi, Japan
- Born: 30 July 1910; Kōchi Prefecture, Japan
- Died: 22 February 1980 (aged 69); Kōchi, Japan
- Military career
- Allegiance: Empire of Japan
- Branch: Imperial Japanese Navy Air Service (IJN)
- Service years: 1928–1945
- Rank: Lieutenant Junior Grade
- Nicknames: Matchan or Matsu-chan (meaning a little pine tree) and Temei
- Conflicts: Second Sino-Japanese War; World War II; Pacific War

Sadaaki Akamatsu (赤松 貞明, Akamatsu Sadaaki; 30 July 1910 – 22 February 1980) was an officer and ace fighter pilot in the Imperial Japanese Navy (IJN) during the Second Sino-Japanese War and the Pacific theater of World War II. In aerial combat over China and the Pacific, he was officially credited with destroying 27 enemy aircraft.

== Flying ace ==
Akamatsu was known as a troublemaker and trickster. Many of his air victories were obtained while drunk. Despite this, his supervisors stood behind him, as did his fellow pilots who frequently defended and covered for him. Henry Sakaida confirmed that Akamatsu flew for more than 8,000 flight hours. Saburo Sakai, a leading ace, claimed in his memoir "Samurai" Akamatsu had a phone line installed at a brothel near Atsugi to get enemy plane alerts. Sakai further wrote Akamatsu claimed 100 kills when he was drunk, but never claimed anything when he was sober. At the end of the war, Akamatsu flew the Mitsubishi J2M Raiden fighter.

Akamatsu was credited with shooting down 11 enemy aircraft over China in the Second Sino-Japanese War, including four in a single engagement near Nanchang on 25 February 1938. In the opening months of the Pacific War, he served in the Philippines and Dutch East Indies campaigns. From January 1944 until the end of the war, Akamatsu flew out of Atsugi Air Base, defending Tokyo from Allied air attacks.

== After the war ==
After the war, Akamatsu worked as a fish search pilot for the Kōchi Fishery Association and later ran a small cafe in Kōchi. After struggling for years with alcoholism, Akamatsu died of pneumonia on 22 February 1980.
