= Masato Furuoya =

Japanese actor (1957–2003)

- 古尾谷 雅人
- Born: May 14, 1957; Nakahara-ku, Kawasaki, Kanagawa, Japan
- Died: March 25, 2003 (aged 45); Tokyo, Japan
- Cause of death: Suicide by hanging
- Occupation: Actor
- Years active: 1977–2003
- Spouse: Eri Kanuma

Masato Furuoya (古尾谷 雅人, Furuoya Masato; May 14, 1957 – March 25, 2003) was a Japanese actor. He won the award for best actor at the 2nd Yokohama Film Festival and at the 5th Hochi Film Award for Disciples of Hippocrates and at the 12th Yokohama Film Festival for Uchū no hōsoku. He committed suicide on March 25, 2003, by hanging himself at his home in Tokyo.

== Filmography ==
=== Film ===
- Onna kyôshi (1977) – Hideo Egawa
- Hitozuma shudan boko chishi jiken (1978) – Shozo Utagawa
- Tenshi no harawata: Nami (1979) – Man who attacked Ryoko
- Sûpâ gun redei Wani Bunsho (1979) – Makoto Katô, Robber of bank
- Danchizuma nikuyoku no tousui (1979) – Shûichi Aono
- Shûdôjo: Kokui no naka no uzuki (1980) – Hirohi Mitamura
- Disciples of Hippocrates (1980) – Ogino, Aisaku
- Slow na boogie ni shitekure (1981) – Goro
- Akuryo-To (1981) – Goro Mitsuki
- Kaze no uta o kike (1982) – Punk
- Kugatsu no joudan kurabu bando (1982) – Moro
- Kyôdan (1982) – Akihiko Numata
- Ushimitsu no mura (1983) – Tsugio Inumaru
- Itsuka darekaga korosareru (1984) – Kazuo Takara
- Bakumatsu seishun graffiti: Ronin Sakamoto Ryoma (1986) – Shujiro Hirai
- Kyabarê (1986) – Sajima
- Lost in the Wilderness (1986) – Masao Ogawa
- Ôidippsu no katana (1986) – Shunsuke Osako
- Oedipus no yaiba (1986) – Shunsuke Osako
- Wakarenu riyû (1987) – Matsunaga
- Gokiburi-tachi no tasogare (1987) – Hans (voice)
- Wuthering Heights (1988) – Yoshimaru
- Hana no Furu Gogo (1989)
- Uchū no hōsoku (1990) – Yoshiaki Masaki
- Pachinko monogatari (1990)
- Yamada babaa ni hanataba o (1990) – Yuji Mizuzawa
- Best Guy (1990) – Major Nobuaki "Zombie/Demon" Yoshinaga
- Satsujin ga ippai (1991)
- Ryakudatsu ai (1991)
- All Under the Moon (1993) – Konno
- Shoot (1994) – Teacher Isogai
- Ie naki ko (1994)
- Mâkusu no yama (1995) – Higo
- Endoresu warutsu (1995) – Motoharu Yoshizawa
- Fuhô-taizai (1996)
- Kindaichi shonen no jikembo: Shanghai ningyo densetsu (1997)
- Mamotte agetai! (2000) – Shinji Tachibana
- Howaitoauto (2000) – Kensuke Fujimaki

=== Television ===
- The Kindaichi Case Files (1995) – Isamu Kenmochi
- Rokubanme no Sayoko (2000)
- Shounen wa Tori ni Natta (2001)
