= Masayuki Hirahara =

Japanese pianist and composer (born 1980)

- Born: July 15, 1980 (age 46); Kobe, Japan
- Occupations: Pianist, composer

Masayuki Hirahara (平原 誠之 Hirahara Masayuki July 15, 1980) is a Japanese pianist and composer.

== Early life ==
Masayuki Hirahara was born and raised in Kobe, Japan. He started taking piano lessons when he was eight years old. Through these lessons, he became interested in composition and he studied it by himself. In his first year of the high school, he studied under a pianist who had graduated from the Berlin University of the Arts for one year. After that, he taught himself how to play and compose. In 1999 he participated in the music competition of the Great Hanshin earthquake (Kobe earthquake) Reconstruction Memorial Classic Festival and he won Hyogo Arts & Culture Association’s Prize and a golden award in composition section. He worked for a publisher which publishes a monthly piano magazine from 2000 to 2003.

== Performing and composing career ==
With the encouragement of those who heard his performance in 1999, he started his career as a performer at a hall in Kobe in February 2003. His performances moved the audiences and his reputation spread by word of mouth; he held a concert at an 800-person capacity hall in Tokyo in October of the same year. In 2009, Princess Takamado heard his performance. In 2010, international Chopin year, he was invited to play at the Chopin 200th anniversary concert at Reid Concert Hall in the University of Edinburgh cosponsored by the Japanese Consulate General in Edinburgh, the University of Edinburgh and the Polish Consulate General in Edinburgh. In the following year, he was invited by the Japanese Consulate General in Edinburgh to perform at St Mary's Cathedral in Edinburgh, the University of Glasgow, and the Sage Gateshead. In 2012, he was invited to perform at charity concerts in Los Angeles for the 2011 Tōhoku earthquake and tsunami. He played the piano in a retirement home and at Lutheran Church of the Resurrection in Huntington Beach, California. He lectured about composition to the master class of Yamaha Music Center in Irvine, California. In the same year, he performed at the Ise Grand Shrine for the 62nd Sikinen Sengu Ceremony (fixed-interval transfer ceremony - wherein a shrine's sacred object is transferred to a newly constructed main hall) and he became the first person who played the piano in the Ise Grand Shrine. In 2014, he was designated to be the Japan-El Salvador goodwill ambassador of music. In March 2015, he played at the Japan - El Salvador Diplomatic establishment’s 80th anniversary concert. In November, he held the anniversary charity concert in Tokyo and it was honored with the presence of the Princess Mako of Akishino, and donated the part of the proceeds of that concert for the activities of dissemination of music in El Salvador.
