= Yasuo Baba =

Yasuo Baba is a Japanese film director.

He has produced programs for Japanese television and has directed six feature films, including Bubble Fiction: Boom or Bust (2007), which was selected for inclusion in the 31st annual Hong Kong International Film Festival, Messengers (1999), Embrace Me as Many Times as There Are Waves (1991), and Take Me Out to the Snowland (1987).

== See also ==
- Cinema of Japan
