= 1987 in Japanese television =

Events in 1987 in Japanese television.

== Debuts ==
Show	Station	Premiere Date	Genre	Original Run
Masked Ninja: Akakage	Nippon TV	October 13	anime	October 13, 1987 – March 22, 1988
Akai Kodan Zillion	Nippon TV	April 12	anime	April 12, 1987 – December 13, 1987
Choujinki Metalder	TV Asahi	March 16	tokusatsu	March 16, 1987 – January 17, 1988
City Hunter	Yomiuri TV	April 6	anime	April 6, 1987 – March 28, 1988
Fist of the North Star 2	Fuji TV	March 13	anime	March 13, 1987 – February 18, 1988
Hikari Sentai Maskman	TV Asahi	February 28	tokusatsu	February 28, 1987 – February 20, 1988
Kamen Rider Black	MBS	October 4	tokusatsu	October 4, 1987 – October 9, 1988
Kimagure Orange Road	Nippon TV	April 6	anime	April 6, 1987 – March 7, 1988
Oraa Guzura Dado 2	TV Tokyo	October 12	anime	October 12, 1987 – September 20, 1988
Transformers: The Headmasters	Nippon TV	July 3	anime	July 3, 1987 – March 25, 1988
Ai no Wakakusa Monogatari	Fuji TV	January 11	anime	January 11, 1987 – December 27, 1987

== Ongoing shows ==
- Music Fair, music (1964–present)
- Mito Kōmon, jidaigeki (1969-2011)
- Sazae-san, anime (1969–present)
- Ōoka Echizen, jidaigeki (1970-1999)
- FNS Music Festival, music (1974–present)
- Panel Quiz Attack 25, game show (1975–present)
- Doraemon, anime (1979-2005)
- Maison Ikkoku, anime (1986-1988)
- Dragon Ball, anime (1986–1989)
- Saint Seiya, anime (1986–1989)

== Endings ==
Show	Station	Ending Date	Genre	Original Run
Akai Kodan Zillion	Nippon TV	December 13	anime	April 12, 1987 – December 13, 1987
Ai no Wakakusa Monogatari	Fuji TV	December 27	anime	January 11, 1987 – December 27, 1987
Choushinsei Flashman			tokusatsu	
Fist of the North Star	Fuji TV	March 5	anime	October 11, 1984 – March 5, 1987
High School! Kimengumi			anime	
Jikuu Senshi Spielban			tokusatsu	
Sukeban Deka 3: Shojo Ninpojo Denki			drama	
Touch			anime	

== TV specials ==
Show	Station	Genre	Original Run
Minna Agechau	Fuji TV	drama	June 22, 1987

== See also ==
- 1987 in anime
- List of Japanese television dramas
- 1987 in Japan
- List of Japanese films of 1987
