= 1983 in Japanese television =

Events in 1983 in Japanese television.

== Events ==
- October 1 - Hachiji da yo! Zen'in shūgō airs its 700th episode.

== Channels ==
Launches:

- Unknown - Nippon Television Network System

== Debuts ==
Show	Station	Premiere Date	Genre	Original Run
Captain Tsubasa	MBS	October 10	anime	October 10, 1983 – March 27, 1986
Cat’s Eye	Nippon TV	July 11	anime	July 11, 1983 – July 8, 1985
Igano Kabamaru	Nippon TV	October 20	anime	October 20, 1983 – March 29, 1984
Kagaku Sentai Dynaman	TV Asahi	February 5	tokusatsu	February 5, 1983 – January 28, 1984
Miyuki			anime	
Oshin			drama	
Story of the Alps: My Annette			anime	
Tokugawa Ieyasu			Taiga drama	
Uchuu Keiji Sharivan			tokusatsu	

== Ongoing ==
- Music Fair, music (1964–present)
- Mito Kōmon, jidaigeki (1969–2011)
- Hachiji da yo! Zen'in shūgō, comedy (1969-1985)
- Sazae-san, anime (1969–present)
- Ōedo Sōsamō, anime (1970–1984)
- Ōoka Echizen, jidaigeki (1970–1999)
- FNS Music Festival, music (1974–present)
- Panel Quiz Attack 25, game show (1975–present)
- Doraemon, anime (1979–2005)
- Dr. Slump - Arale-chan, anime (1981–1986)
- Urusei Yatsura, anime (1981–1986)

== Endings ==
Show	Station	Ending Date	Genre	Original Run
Armored Fleet Dairugger XV	TV Tokyo	February 23	anime	March 3, 1982 – February 23, 1983
Dai Sentai Goggle-V	TV Asahi	January 29	tokusatsu	February 6, 1982 – January 29, 1983
Gyakuten! Ippatsuman			anime	
The New Adventures of Maya the Honey Bee	TV Osaka	September 27	anime	October 12, 1982 – September 27, 1983
Star Tanjō!	Nippon TV	September 25	talent	October 3, 1971 – September 25, 1983
Uchuu Keiji Gavan			tokusatsu	
Super Dimension Fortress Macross	MBS	June 26	anime	October 3, 1982 – January 29, 1983
Combat Mecha Xabungle	Nagoya TV	June 26	anime	October 3, 1982 – January 29, 1983

== See also ==
- 1983 in anime
- List of Japanese television dramas
- 1983 in Japan
- List of Japanese films of 1983
