= 1989 in Japanese television =

Events in 1989 in Japanese television.

== Channels ==
Launches:

- October 1 - TV-U Yamagata

== Debuts ==
Show	Station	Premiere Date	Genre	Original Run
Alfred J. Kwak	TV Tokyo	April 3	anime	April 3, 1989 - March 29, 1990
Blue Blink	NHK General TV	April 7	anime	April 7, 1989 - March 16, 1990
City Hunter 3	Yomiuri TV	October 15	anime	October 15, 1989 – January 21, 1990
Downtown no Gaki no Tsukai ya Arahende!!	Nippon TV	October 3	game show	October 3, 1989 – present
Dragon Ball Z	Fuji TV	April 26	anime	April 26, 1989 - January 31, 1996
Dragon Quest	Fuji TV	December 2	anime	December 2, 1989 – September 22, 1990
Fight! Super Robot Life-Form Transformers: Victory	Nippon TV	March 14	anime	March 14, 1989 – December 19, 1989
Jungle Emperor	TV Tokyo	October 12	anime	October 12, 1989 – October 11, 1990
Kousoku Sentai Turboranger	TV Asahi	February 25	tokusatsu	February 25, 1989 – February 23, 1990
Legend of Heavenly Sphere Shurato	TV Tokyo	April 6	anime	April 6, 1989 – January 18, 1990
Madö King Granzört	Nippon TV	April 7	anime	April 7, 1989 – March 2, 1990
Magical Hat	Fuji TV	October 18	anime	October 18, 1989 - July 6, 1990
Patlabor: The TV Series	Nippon TV	October 11	anime	October 11, 1989 – September 29, 1990
Ranma ½	Fuji TV	April 15	anime	April 15, 1989 – September 16, 1989
Ranma ½ Netto-hen	Fuji TV	October 20	anime	October 20, 1989 – September 25, 1992
The Adventures of Peter Pan	Fuji TV	January 15	anime	January 15, 1989 – December 24, 1989
The Mobile Cop Jiban	TV Asahi	January 29	tokusatsu	January 29, 1989 – January 28, 1990
Yawara! a fashionable judo girl	Yomiuri TV	October 16	anime	October 16, 1989 – September 21, 1992

== Ongoing ==
- Music Fair, music (1964–present)
- Mito Kōmon, jidaigeki (1969–2011)
- Sazae-san, anime (1969–present)
- Ōoka Echizen, jidaigeki (1970–1999)
- FNS Music Festival, music (1974–present)
- Panel Quiz Attack 25, game show (1975–present)
- Doraemon, anime (1979–2005)
- Kiteretsu Daihyakka, anime (1988–1996)
- Soreike! Anpanman, anime (1988–present)
- Bubblegum Crisis, anime (1987–1991)

== Endings ==
Show	Station	Ending Date	Genre	Original Run
Choujuu Sentai Liveman	TV Asahi	February 18	tokusatsu	February 27, 1988 – February 18, 1989
City Hunter 2	Yomiuri TV	July 14	anime	April 2, 1988 – July 14, 1989
Dennou Keisatsu Cybercop	Nippon TV	July 5	tokusatsu	October 2, 1988 - July 5, 1989
Don-Don Domel and Ron	TV Tokyo	March 27	anime	April 5, 1988 - March 27, 1989
Dragon Ball	Fuji TV	April 12	anime	February 26, 1986 - April 12, 1989
Fight! Super Robot Life-Form Transformers: Victory	Nippon TV	December 19	anime	March 14, 1989 – December 19, 1989
Kamen Rider Black RX	MBS	September 24	tokusatsu	October 23, 1988 – September 24, 1989
Legendary Armor Samurai Troopers	TV Asahi	March 4	anime	April 30, 1988 – March 4, 1989
Mashin Hero Wataru	Nippon TV	March 31	anime	April 15, 1988 – March 31, 1989
Ranma ½	Fuji TV	September 16	anime	April 15, 1989 – September 16, 1989
Saint Seiya	TV Asahi	April 1	anime	October 11, 1986 – April 1, 1989
Sekai Ninja Sen Jiraiya	TV Asahi	January 22	tokusatsu	January 24, 1988 – January 22, 1989
The Adventures of Peter Pan	Fuji TV	December 24	anime	January 15, 1989 – December 24, 1989
Transformers: Super-God Masterforce	Nippon TV	March 7	anime	April 12, 1988 – March 7, 1989

== See also ==
- 1989 in anime
- List of Japanese television dramas
- 1989 in Japan
- List of Japanese films of 1989
