= 1982 in Japan =

- Decades: 1960s; 1970s; 1980s; 1990s; 2000s
- See also: Other events of 1982; History of Japan; Timeline; Years

Events in the year 1982 in Japan.

== Incumbents ==
- Emperor: Hirohito (Emperor Shōwa)
- Prime Minister: Zenko Suzuki (L–Iwate) until 27 November 1982, Yasuhiro Nakasone (L–Gunma)
- Chief Cabinet Secretary: Kiichi Miyazawa (L–Hiroshima) until November 27, Masaharu Gotōda (L–Tokushima)
- Chief Justice of the Supreme Court: Takaaki Hattori until September 30, Jirō Terata from October 1
- President of the House of Representatives: Hajime Fukuda (L–Fukui)
- President of the House of Councillors: Masatoshi Tokunaga (L–national)
- Diet sessions: 96th (regular session opened in December 1981, to August 21), 97th (extraordinary, November 26 to December 25), 98th (regular, December 28 to 1983, May 26)

=== Governors ===
- Aichi Prefecture: Yoshiaki Nakaya
- Akita Prefecture: Kikuji Sasaki
- Aomori Prefecture: Masaya Kitamura
- Chiba Prefecture: Takeshi Numata
- Ehime Prefecture: Haruki Shiraishi
- Fukui Prefecture: Heidayū Nakagawa
- Fukuoka Prefecture: Hikaru Kamei
- Fukushima Prefecture: Isao Matsudaira
- Gifu Prefecture: Yosuke Uematsu
- Gunma Prefecture: Ichiro Shimizu
- Hiroshima Prefecture: Toranosuke Takeshita
- Hokkaido: Naohiro Dōgakinai
- Hyogo Prefecture: Tokitada Sakai
- Ibaraki Prefecture: Fujio Takeuchi
- Ishikawa Prefecture: Yōichi Nakanishi
- Iwate Prefecture: Tadashi Nakamura
- Kagawa Prefecture: Tadao Maekawa
- Kagoshima Prefecture: Kaname Kamada
- Kanagawa Prefecture: Kazuji Nagasu
- Kochi Prefecture: Chikara Nakauchi
- Kumamoto Prefecture: Issei Sawada
- Kyoto Prefecture: Yukio Hayashida
- Mie Prefecture: Ryōzō Tagawa
- Miyagi Prefecture: Sōichirō Yamamoto
- Miyazaki Prefecture: Suketaka Matsukata
- Nagano Prefecture: Gorō Yoshimura
- Nagasaki Prefecture: Kan'ichi Kubo (until 1 March); Isamu Takada (starting 1 March)
- Nara Prefecture: Shigekiyo Ueda
- Niigata Prefecture: Takeo Kimi
- Oita Prefecture: Morihiko Hiramatsu
- Okayama Prefecture: Shiro Nagano
- Okinawa Prefecture: Junji Nishime
- Osaka Prefecture: Sakae Kishi
- Saga Prefecture: Kumao Katsuki
- Saitama Prefecture: Yawara Hata
- Shiga Prefecture: Masayoshi Takemura
- Shiname Prefecture: Seiji Tsunematsu
- Shizuoka Prefecture: Keizaburō Yamamoto
- Tochigi Prefecture: Yuzuru Funada
- Tokushima Prefecture: Shinzo Miki
- Tokyo: Shun'ichi Suzuki
- Tottori Prefecture: Kōzō Hirabayashi
- Toyama Prefecture: Yutaka Nakaoki
- Wakayama Prefecture: Shirō Kariya
- Yamagata Prefecture: Seiichirō Itagaki
- Yamaguchi Prefecture: Toru Hirai
- Yamanashi Prefecture: Kōmei Mochizuki

== Events ==
- January 6 - According to Japan Coast Guard official confirmed report, a fishing boat, Akebono Maru No.28 sank with high waves caused by stormy weather in Bering Sea, 32 crew were perished.
- February 8 - A fire at the Hotel New Japan in Tokyo kills 33.
- February 9 - Japan Airlines Flight 350 crashes in Tokyo Bay, killing 24 on board.
- March 21 – According to Japanese government official report, twelve climbers were human fatalities, due suffer heavy fog and avalanche hit on Mount Yatsu, Nagano Prefecture.
- April 1 - The 500 yen coin is introduced.
- July 23 - A heavy torrential rain, landslide hit in central Kyushu Island, according to Fire and Disaster Management Agency confirmed report, total 326 person lives, including 299 in Nagasaki area.
- August 2 - Typhoon Bess, according to Fire and Disaster Management Agency confirmed report, 95 person fatalities.
- September 1 – A first edition of Dōshin Sports (道新スポーツ), a subsidiary of Hokkaidō Shinbun (北海道新聞) was published in Sapporo.
- September 24 - A Ministry of Education official is arrested on bribery charges.

Date unknown

- Yamaha bravo snowmobile is introduced and begins production.

== Popular culture ==
=== Arts and entertainment ===
In anime, the winners of the Anime Grand Prix were the TV series Six God Combination Godmars for best work, an episode of Urusei Yatsura for best episode, Takeru Myoujin from Six God Combination Godmars and voiced by Yū Mizushima for best character, Toshio Furukawa for best voice actor, Mami Koyama for best voice actress and Macross, the opening for the TV series Super Dimension Fortress Macross and sung by Makoto Fujiwara for best song. For a list of anime released in 1982 see Category:1982 anime.

In film, Fall Guy won the Best Film award at the Japan Academy Prize, the Blue Ribbon Awards and the Hochi Film Award. Exchange Students won the Best Film award at the Yokohama Film Festival. For a list of Japanese films released in 1982 see Japanese films of 1982.

In manga, Gakuto Retsuden by Motoka Murakami (shōnen), Yōkihi-den by Suzue Miuchi (shōjo) and Karyūdo no Seiza by Machiko Satonaka (general) were the winners of the Kodansha Manga Award. The winners of the Shogakukan Manga Award were Tsuribaka Nisshi by Jūzō Yamasaki and Ken'ichi Kitami (general), Miyuki and Touch by Mitsuru Adachi (shōnen or shōjo) and Game Center Arashi and Kon'nichiwa! Mi-com by Mitsuru Sugaya (children). Gin no Sankaku by Moto Hagio won the Seiun Award for Best Comic of the Year. For a list manga released in 1982 see Category:1982 Manga.

In music, the 33rd Kōhaku Uta Gassen was won by the Red Team (women). They were: Junko Mihara, Naoko Kawai, Aming, Mizue Takada, Seiko Matsuda, Kyoko Suizenji, Sugar, Naoko Ken, Los Indios and Sylvia, Mina Aoe, Chiyoko Shimakura, Mieko Makimura, Ikue Sakakibara, Rumiko Koyanagi, Junko Sakurada, Miyuki Kawanaka, Hiromi Iwasaki, Masako Mori, Sayuri Ishikawa, Sachiko Kobayashi, Aki Yashiro and Harumi Miyako. Hiromi Iwasaki won the Nippon Television Music Festival and the Japan Music Awards with her song Madonna tachi no lullaby. The Japan Record Award was won by Takashi Hosokawa with his song Kita Sakaba. The May edition of the Yamaha Popular Song Contest was won by Aming with their song Matsuwa. Seiko Matsuda won the FNS Music Festival with Nobara no Etude. For other music in 1982, see 1982 in Japanese music.

In television, for dramas initially broadcast in 1982 see: List of Japanese television dramas#1982. For more events see: 1982 in Japanese television.

=== Sports ===
At the 1982 Asian Games Japan ranked second in the number of gold medals with 57 and tied with China in the total medal count with 153.

In badminton, Hiroyuki Hasegawa won the Men's singles and Sumiko Kitada the Women's singles at the Japanese National Badminton Championships (for the other results see the article).

In baseball, the Seibu Lions won the Japan Series 4-3 against the Chunichi Dragons. The MVP in the Central League was Takayoshi Nakao and in the Pacific League Hiromitsu Ochiai. At the Japanese High School Baseball Championship Ikeda won 12-2 against Hiroshima.

In basketball, Japan hosted the ABC Championship for Women 1982 that was won by Korea, with the Japanese team winning the third place. The All Japan Intercollegiate Basketball Championship was won by Nippon Sport Science.

In chess, Hiroyuki Nishimura (men's) and Naoko Takemoto (women's) were the winners of the Japanese Chess Championship.

In figure skating, the winners of the 1981–1982 Japan Figure Skating Championships were Fumio Igarashi (men), Mariko Yoshida (women) and Noriko Sato and Tadayuki Takahashi in ice dancing.

In golf, Yoshitaka Yamamoto won the NST Niigata Open, Hideto Shigenobu won the Kansai Pro Championship, Takashi Kurihara won the Hiroshima Open, Masahiro Kuramoto won the Japan PGA Championship, Teruo Sugihara won the Kansai Open and Akira Yabe won the Japan Open Golf Championship.

In football (soccer) Japan hosted the 1982 Intercontinental Cup between C.A. Peñarol and Aston Villa F.C. Peñarol won 2-0. Mitsubishi Motors (currently the Urawa Red Diamonds) won the 1982 Japan Soccer League. Yamaha Motor Company (currently the Júbilo Iwata) won the Second Division of the Soccer League and was promoted to the First Division. It also won the Emperor's Cup. For the champions of the regional leagues see: Japanese Regional Leagues 1982.

== Births ==
=== January to June ===
- January 5
  - Norichika Aoki, baseball player
  - Maki Tsukada, judoka
- January 7 - Ryang Yong-Gi, Japanese-born football player
- January 12 - Ayumi Murata, singer, voice actor
- January 20 - Takatoshi Uchida, football player
- January 21 – Go Shiozaki, professional wrestler
- January 25 – Sho Sakurai, singer
- January 26 – Yasushi Tsujimoto, wrestler
- January 30 - Daiki Iwamasa, football player
- February 7 - Osamu Mukai, actor
- February 9 – Ami Suzuki, singer
- February 17 - Satoko Mabuchi, softball player
- February 18 - Akiko Chubachi, model
- February 20 - Ryosei Konishi, actor, voice actor
- March 7 – Erika Yamakawa, gravure idol, talent
- March 10 - Shin Koyamada, actor, martial artist, philanthropist
- March 12 - Hisato Satō, football player
- March 15 - Yōko Maki, actress
- March 15 - Tonikaku Akarui Yasumura, comedian
- March 19 – Yoshikaze Masatsugu, sumo wrestler
- March 24 – Kenichirou Ohashi, voice actor
- March 25 - Kayoko Fukushi, long-distance runner
- March 25 - Yoshikazu Kotani, actor, singer
- March 27 - Kurara Chibana, model
- April 3 – Kasumi Nakane, gravure idol
- April 3 - Hiraku Hori, kickboxer, martial artist
- April 20
  - Sayaka Kamiya, actress and model
  - Keiichiro Nagashima, speed skater
- May 4 - Norihito Kobayashi, Nordic combined skier
- May 13 – Yoko Kumada, gravure idol
- May 14 – Ai Shibata, swimmer
- May 15 - Tatsuya Fujiwara, actor
- May 21 - Kota Ibushi, professional wrestler
- May 24 - Hiroyasu Tanaka, baseball player
- May 30 - Asahi Uchida, actor
- June 4 - Soshi Tanaka, figure skater
- June 9 - Yoshito Ōkubo, football player
- June 27 – Takeru Shibaki, actor

=== July to December ===
- July 3 - Cyber Kong, professional wrestler
- July 5 - Junri Namigata, tennis player
- July 9 – Sakon Yamamoto, racing driver
- July 21 - Mao Kobayashi, newscaster and actress (d. 2017)
- July 28 - Yoshiyuki Kamei, baseball player
- August 4 - Seiichi Uchikawa, baseball player
- August 6 - Hiroki Hirako, speed skater
- August 15 - Tsuyoshi Hayashi, actor
- August 16 - Tomohiro Ito, sprinter
- August 24 - Daiki Hata, mixed martial artist
- August 24 - Tetsu Sawaki, actor
- August 27 - Tatsuyuki Tomiyama, football player
- September 3 – Kaori Natori, singer
- September 9 – Ai Otsuka, singer, songwriter, pianist and actress
- September 12 – Nana Ozaki, gravure idol
- September 19 - Shoji Sato, badminton player
- September 22 – Kosuke Kitajima, swimmer
- September 23 - Ryuichi Kiyonari, motorcycle road racer
- September 28 - Takeshi Aoki, football player
- October 4 - Takashi Kitano, football player
- October 28 - Mai Kuraki, singer-songwriter, producer
- November 2 – Kyoko Fukada, actress, singer
- November 5 - Saho Harada, synchronized swimmer
- November 5 - Akinori Nakagawa, singer, songwriter, actor
- November 6 - Daisuke Watanabe, actor
- November 8 - Aisa Senda, singer, actress, presenter
- November 13 – Kumi Koda, singer
- November 15 - Rio Hirai, Japanese actress
- November 18 - Masanori Kanehara, mixed martial artist
- November 21 - Shingo Takagi, professional wrestler
- November 27 - Tatsuya Tanaka, football player
- December 12 - Noriyuki Kanzaki, figure skater
- December 12 - Ai Kato, actress, model
- December 13 - Eita, actor
- December 18 - Aya Yasuda, luger
- December 24 – Masaki Aiba, singer
- December 25 - Yasuhiro Kido, kickboxer, martial artist
- December 29 - Noriaki Kinoshita, American football player

== Deaths ==
- February 13 - Chiemi Eri, singer, actress
- February 26 - Teinosuke Kinugasa, actor, film director
- March 12 - Genzō Kitazumi, photographer
- March 16 - Arihiro Fujimura, actor, voice actor
- May 1 - Torajiro Saito, film director
- September 22 - Shin Saburi, actor
- December 28 - Shin Kishida, actor

== See also ==
- 1982 in Japanese television
- List of Japanese films of 1982
