= Katsumoto Saotome =

Japanese writer (1932–2022)

- Born: March 26, 1932; Adaichi, Tokyo, Empire of Japan (Now Japan)
- Died: May 10, 2022 (aged 90); Saitama Prefecture, Japan
- Occupations: Writer; pacifist
- Years active: 1952–2022
- Known for: Downtown Home (1952); War and Youth (1991)
- Spouse: Naoe Kaneko (m. 1962)
- Children: 2, including Ai

Katsumoto Saotome (早乙女勝元, Saotome Katsumoto; March 26, 1932 – May 10, 2022) was a Japanese writer, children's book author, and pacifist. His work has been crucial in raising awareness of war dead, such as air raids.

As a member of "Burnt-out ruins generation" (Also known as Yakeato Generation (1930–1945)), Saotome dedicated his life to documenting and preserving the stories of Asia-Pacific War in World War II, such as civilian victims of firebombs in Kanto Region including Tokyo Prefecture between March and August 1945. He was one of a leading voice in ensuring Japanese civilian victims of air raids were not forgotten by Japanese history of Japanese government.

He published his numerous books and documentary films, with private funds, established a museum in eastern Tokyo to memorialized war victims and ensure their experiences were not forgotten.

== Early and personal life ==
Katsumoto Saotome was born on March 26, 1932 in Adaichi, Tokyo, Empire of Japan (Now Japan). His family were struggled financially. At age 12, he was consripted to work in a factory, collecting scrap metal for munitions.

On the night of March 10, 1945, B-29 bombers launched a massive incendiary attack on Kanto Region, such as Tokyo and 3 surrounding prefectures (Kanagawa, Saitama, and Chiba Prefectures), creating an inferno that killed an estimated 500,000 Japanese people including 100,000 Japanese people in Tokyo Prefecture and left a million homeless. Saotome was 13 and this experience shaped much of his life's work. Saotome and his family were forced to evacuate their wooden house, pushing a handcraft cart through the flame–engulfed streets and witnessing horrific scenes of charred bodies piled along riverbanks. Later, he described the night as his "first experience of death or fear".

In 1962, Saotome married Naoe Kaneko, who had just graduated from a music college. Naoe became as an elementary school teacher. The couple had two children together. His daughter, Ai Saotome, was a Japanese film director and producer.

== Literacy and active career ==
After Asia-Pacific War in World War II, his family's poverty prevented him from attending high school or college, but he pursued writing in his late teens, using a cheap 2B pencil that he called his "weapon".

=== Books and children's books ===
His first book, Downtown Home, published in 1952, was nominated for Naoki Prize. He wrote numerous novels and children's books on the subject of war, with the aim of promoting peace and ensuring future generations understood its horrors. A film based on his book War and Youth, released in 1991.

=== Documentation efforts ===
In 1970, after realizing Tokyo air raid was rarely mentioned in textbooks alongside double atomic bombs hit Hiroshima and Nagasaki, he decided to document survivors' accounts. He gathered eyewitness testimonies and published them in his non-fiction work included a six-volume series to create a historical record, covering the experiences of Japanese people, who survived from advancing firebombs in Tokyo in between March and August 1945.

=== Founding museum ===
As he was frustrated by Japanese government's refusal to fund a public museum, Saotome raised private donations and founded the modern post-Japanese war museum, Center of the Tokyo Raids and War Damage, opened in 2002 after then-Tokyo Prefectural Governor Shintaro Ishihara declined to fund a museum dedicated to the bombing of the city in World War II. However, he remained as a director until his retirement in 2019, just three years before his death.

=== Political stances ===
Saotome was an outspoken pacifist, who believed Japanese government should be take more responsibility for starting the war and compensate civilian victims. He was particularly angered by Japanese government's decision to awarded American Air Force General Curtis LeMay (1906–1990), the architect of Tokyo Air Raid, one of Japan's highest decorations in after the war.

== Death ==
Saotome died at the hospital in Saitama Prefecture, Kanto Region on May 10, 2022 at the age of 90 due to multiple organ failure related to old age. Although his death was unrelated to advancing firebombs, triple disaster, and COVID-19.
