= Genzō =

- Gender: Male
- Language: Japanese

Origin
- Origin: Japan
- Meaning: Different meanings depending on the kanji used

Genzō, also romanized as Genzo, is a masculine Japanese given name associated with:

- Maeda Genzō (前田 玄造; 1831–1906), Japanese photographer
- Genzō Murakami (村上 元三; 1910–2006), Japanese historical novelist
- Genzō Wakayama (若山 弦蔵; 1932–2021), Japanese voice actor and disc jockey
- Genzō Kitazumi (北角 玄三; 1898–1982), Japanese photographer
- Genzō Kurita (栗田 源蔵; 1926–1959), Japanese serial killer
