= Tatsuyuki =

- Gender: Male

Origin
- Origin: Japanese
- Meaning: Different meanings depending on the kanji used

Tatsuyuki (written: 達之, 達行, 龍雪 or 龍之) is a masculine Japanese given name. Notable people with the name include:

- Tatsuyuki Maeda (前田 龍之; born 1968), Japanese composer and sound designer
- Tatsuyuki Nagai (長井 龍雪; born 1976), Japanese anime director
- Tatsuyuki Okuyama (奥山 達之; born 1976), Japanese footballer
- Tatsuyuki Tomiyama (冨山 達行; born 1982), Japanese footballer
- Tatsuyuki Uemoto (上本 達之; born 1980), Japanese baseball player
