= Bombing of Tokyo =

Air raids by the US Army Air Forces in the Pacific War

- Part of the air raids on Japan during the Pacific War
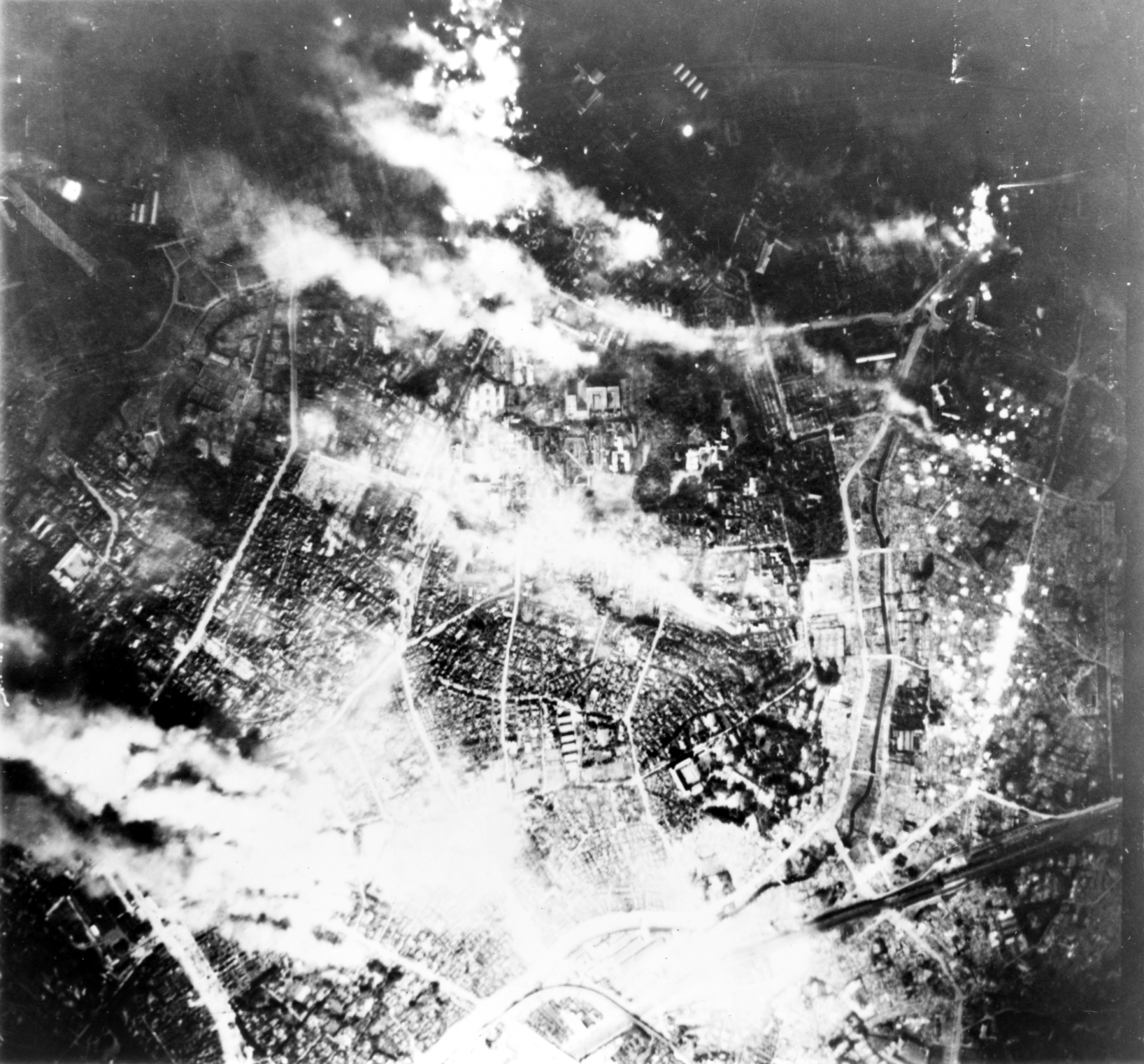
- Tokyo burns under B-29 firebomb assault on May 26, 1945
Date	1942, 1944–1945
Location	Tokyo, Japan 35°41′23″N 139°41′32″E
Result	American victory

Belligerents
United States	Empire of Japan

Casualties and losses
- 105,000+ dead

Tokyo was bombed by the United States Army Air Forces (USAAF) in a series of air raids on Japan, primarily launched during the closing campaigns of the Pacific Theatre of World War II in 1944–1945, prior to the atomic bombings of Hiroshima and Nagasaki.

The strikes conducted by the USAAF on the night of 9–10 March 1945, codenamed Operation Meetinghouse, constitute the single deadliest and most destructive aerial bombing raid in human history. Sixteen square miles (41 km^{2}; 10,000 acres) of central Tokyo was destroyed, leaving an estimated 100,000 civilians dead and over one million homeless.

The U.S. mounted the Doolittle Raid, a small-scale air raid on Tokyo by carrier-based long-range bombers, in April 1942. However, strategic bombing and urban area bombing of Japan only began at scale in 1944 after the long-range B-29 Superfortress bomber entered service. Superfortresses were first deployed from China and thereafter from the Mariana Islands, after they were seized from Japanese forces in mid-1944. B-29 raids from the Marianas began on 17 November 1944 and lasted until 15 August 1945, the day of the Japanese surrender.

With over half of Tokyo's industry spread out among residential and commercial neighborhoods, the firebombing cut the city's industrial output in half. Some modern post-war analysts have called the raids a war crime due to the mass targeting of civilian infrastructure and ensuing large-scale loss of civilian life.

== Doolittle Raid ==
The first American air attack on Tokyo was the Doolittle Raid on 18 April 1942. Sixteen North American B-25 Mitchells modified for carrier operations were launched from USS Hornet, after which they bombed Yokohama and Tokyo and flew on to airfields in China. The raid was largely symbolic, carried out in retaliation for the Japanese attack on Pearl Harbor four months prior. The raid caused minimal damage to Japan's warfighting capability, but was a significant propaganda victory for the United States. The bombers took off at longer range than planned when the Hornet's task force encountered a Japanese picket boat, resulting in all of the attacking aircraft either crashing or being ditched by their crews short of their designated landing sites. One bomber landed in the neutral Soviet Union and its crew was interned, but then smuggled over the border into Iran on 11 May 1943. Two crews were captured by the Japanese in occupied China. Three captured crewmen were later executed by Japanese troops.

== B-29 raids ==
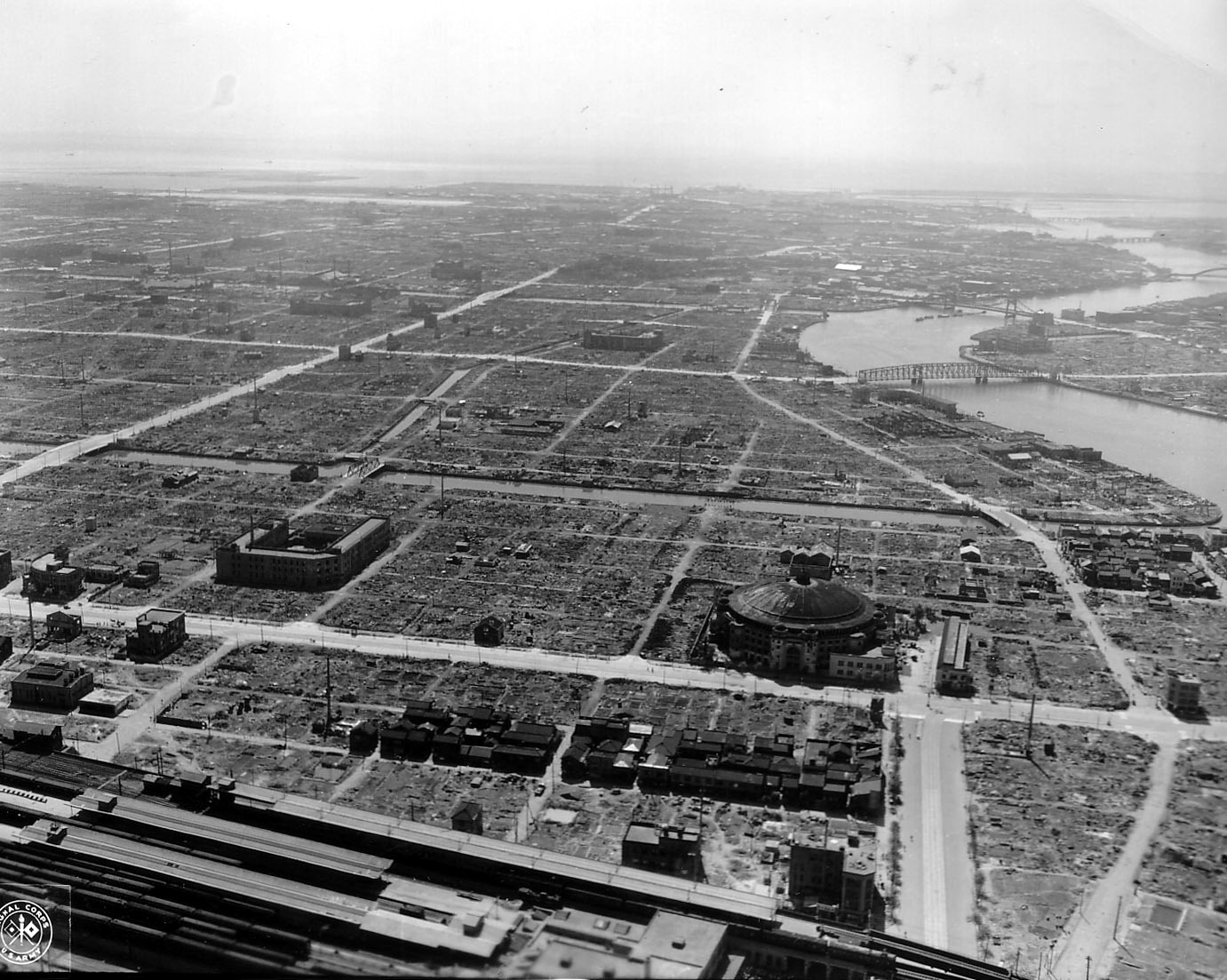
Aerial view of Tokyo following the war

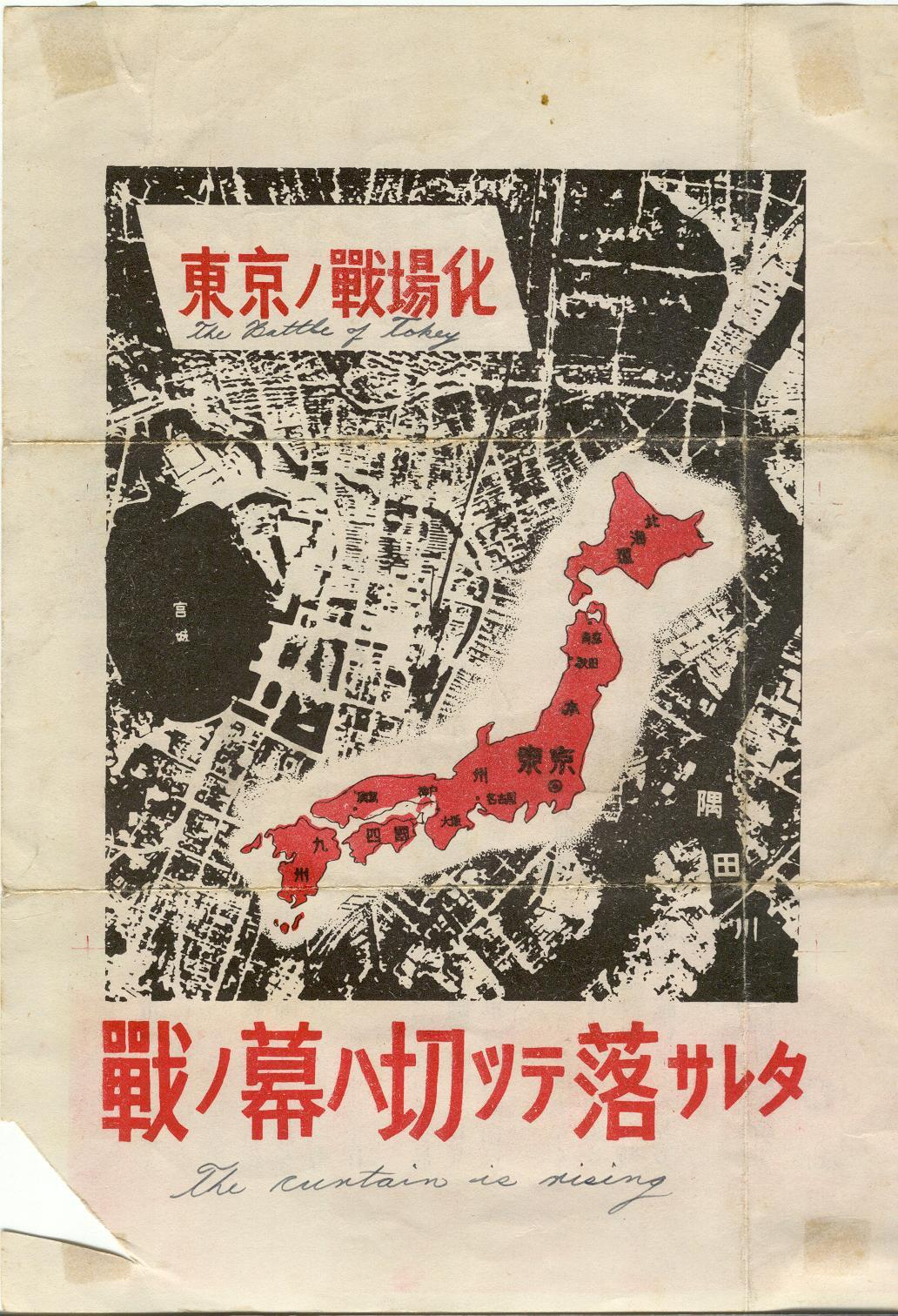
Leaflet dropped over Tokyo, warning civilians to leave the city

The key development that enabled the USAAF to bomb Japan at scale was the B-29 Superfortress strategic bomber, which had an operational range of 3,250 nautical miles (3,740 mi; 6,020 km) and was capable of attacking at high altitude above 30,000 feet (9,100 m), where Japanese air defenses struggled to reach them. Almost 90% of the bombs dropped on the Japanese home islands were delivered by the B-29. The capture of islands sufficiently close to Japan (particularly Saipan and Tinian, seized in June 1944) enabled B-29s based at airfields there to bomb the home islands with increasing regularity.

Prior to the capture of the Marianas, long-range bombing raids were carried out by the Twentieth Air Force operating out of mainland China in Operation Matterhorn under XX Bomber Command. However, while these raids were able to strike parts of southern Japan, they were out of range of Tokyo. It was also logistically difficult for the Allies to maintain a large bomber force in China via circuitous supply routes from India. The strategic situation improved when flight operations from the Northern Mariana Islands commenced in November 1944, but high-altitude bombing attacks using general-purpose bombs were observed to be ineffective by USAAF leaders due to high winds—later discovered to be the jet stream—which carried the bombs off target. Between May and September 1943, bombing trials were conducted on the Japanese Village set-piece target, located at the Dugway Proving Grounds in Utah. These trials demonstrated the effectiveness of incendiary bombs against wood-and-paper buildings common in Japan, and eventually resulted in Curtis LeMay ordering his bomber wings to change tactics and utilize these munitions against Japanese targets.

The first American raid utilizing incendiary munitions was carried out against Kobe on 4 February 1945. Tokyo was hit by incendiaries on 25 February 1945 when 174 B-29s flew a high altitude raid during daylight hours, destroying around 643 acres (260 ha) (2.6 km^{2}) of the snow-covered city, using 453.7 tons of both incendiary and fragmentation bombs. Subsequently, LeMay ordered further B-29 raids on the capital, but at a much lower altitude of 5,000 to 9,000 ft (1,500 to 2,700 m) and at night, judging that Japan's air defenses were weakest in this altitude range, and that Japanese fighter defenses were ineffective at night. LeMay ordered all defensive guns but the tail gun removed from the B-29s, allowing the aircraft to be lighter, use less fuel and carry more ordinance.

When selecting targets for incendiary raids, USAAF planners had consulted maps produced by the Office of Strategic Services (OSS) which ranked Tokyo's five wards by their potential susceptibility to fire. OSS analysts had considered factors such as the average density and structural composition of buildings, and had even utilized risk assessments produced by Japanese insurance companies prior to the war. While the military objective of incendiary raids was to target small, geographically dispersed "light industry" workshops supplying larger Japanese factories, the decision of which specific neighborhoods to bomb was made based on how well USAAF strategists believed they would burn.

=== Operation Meetinghouse ===
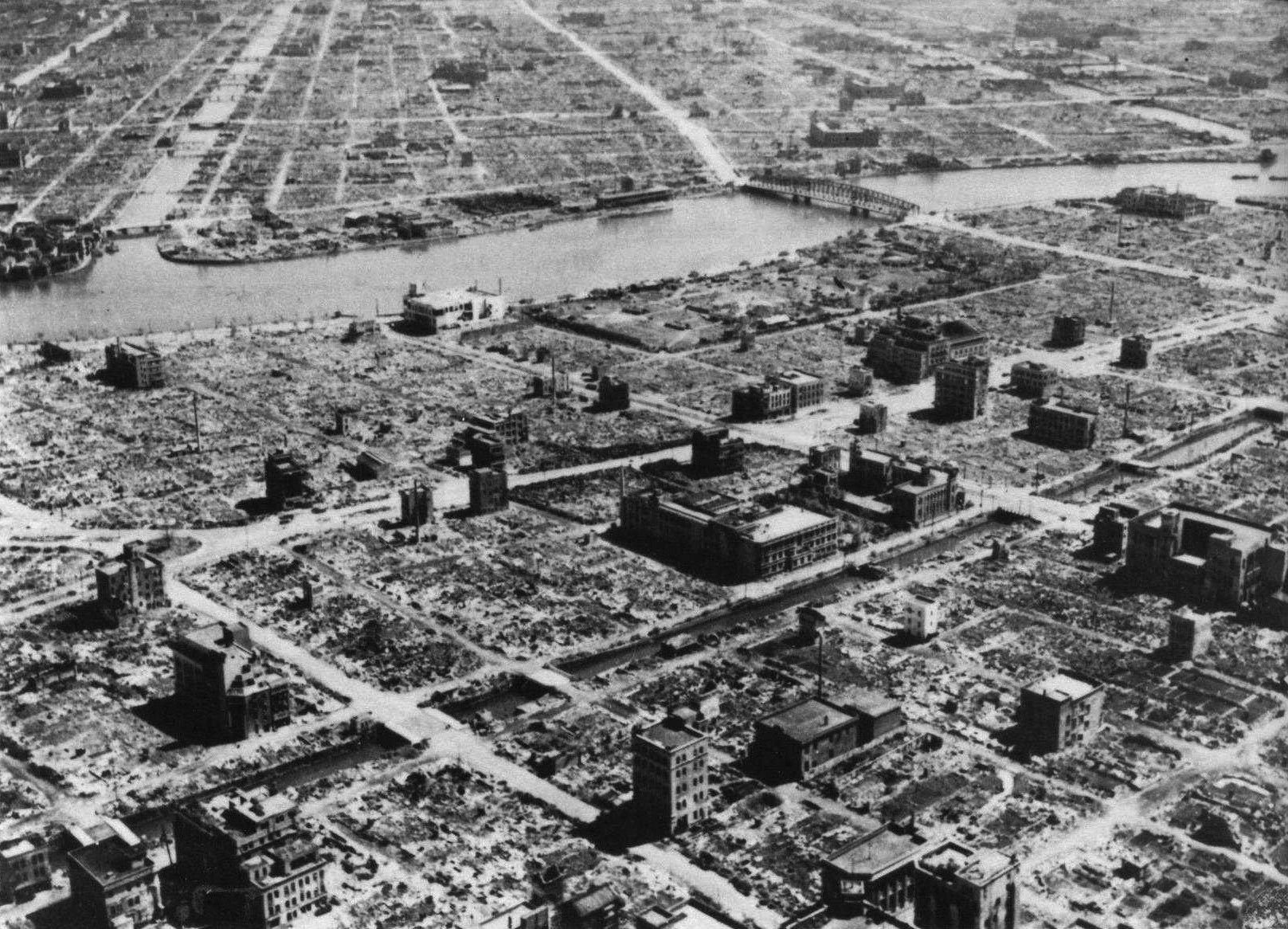
A birds-eye view over the Ningyōchō district of Nihonbashi following Operation Meetinghouse

On the night of 9–10 March 1945, 334 B-29s targeted the Shitamachi neighborhood of Tokyo in a low-altitude bombing raid. Ultimately, 279 bombers dropped 1,665 tons of bombs on the city. The ordnance consisted mostly of 500-pound (230 kg) E-46 cluster bombs, which released 38 napalm-carrying M69 incendiary bomblets at an altitude of 2,000–2,500 ft (610–760 m). The M69s punched through thin roofing material or landed on the ground; in either case they ignited 3–5 seconds later and regurgitated a jet of flaming napalm. A smaller number of M47 incendiary bombs were also dropped; the M47 was a 100-pound (45 kg) jelled-gasoline and white phosphorus bomb, designed to ignite upon impact. Within the first two hours of the raid, rapidly spreading fires had overwhelmed the Japanese authorities' firefighting capabilities. The first B-29s to arrive dropped bombs in a large X pattern centered in Tokyo's densely populated working class district near the docks in both Koto and Chūō city wards on the water; follow-on aircraft simply aimed near this flaming X. Individual fires caused by the bombs swiftly coalesced into a general conflagration, which would have been classified as a firestorm if not for prevailing natural winds gusting at 17 to 28 mph (27 to 45 km/h). Approximately 15.8 square miles (4,090 ha) of the city were destroyed and some 100,000 people are estimated to have been killed. A total of 282 out of 339 B-29s launched for "Meetinghouse" reached Tokyo, 27 of which were lost due to being shot down by Japanese air defenses, mechanical failure, or being caught in massive updrafts caused by the fires below.

The Operation Meetinghouse firebombing of Tokyo on the night of 9 March 1945 was the single deadliest air raid of World War II, causing more destruction than the bombings of Dresden and Hamburg, and even Hiroshima and Nagasaki as single events.

=== Results ===
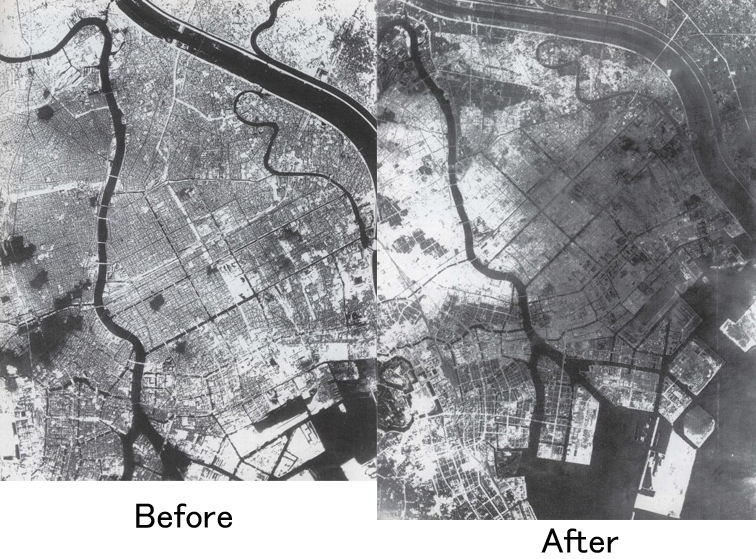
A bird's-eye view of Tokyo before and after the air raids

High-altitude daylight bombing had previously caused minimal damage to Tokyo's heavy industry, but the destruction caused by low-altitude night-time firebombing wiped out much of the dispersed light industry that provided a crucial source for small machine parts for Japanese war manufacturing. Firebombing also killed or made homeless many factory workers critical to the war effort. According to American intelligence in early 1945, over 50% of Tokyo's industry was spread out among residential and commercial neighborhoods; the destruction of these neighborhoods in firebombing raids cut the whole city's output in half. Damage was especially severe in the eastern areas of Tokyo. The districts bombed were home to 1.2 million people in total. The Tokyo police force recorded 267,171 buildings destroyed, which left more than one million people homeless.

Emperor Hirohito's tour of the destroyed areas of Tokyo in March 1945 ended his relative lack of involvement in the Japanese wartime decision-making process and contributed to his eventual decision to capitulate to the Allied powers, culminating in Japan's surrender six months later.

=== Casualty estimates ===
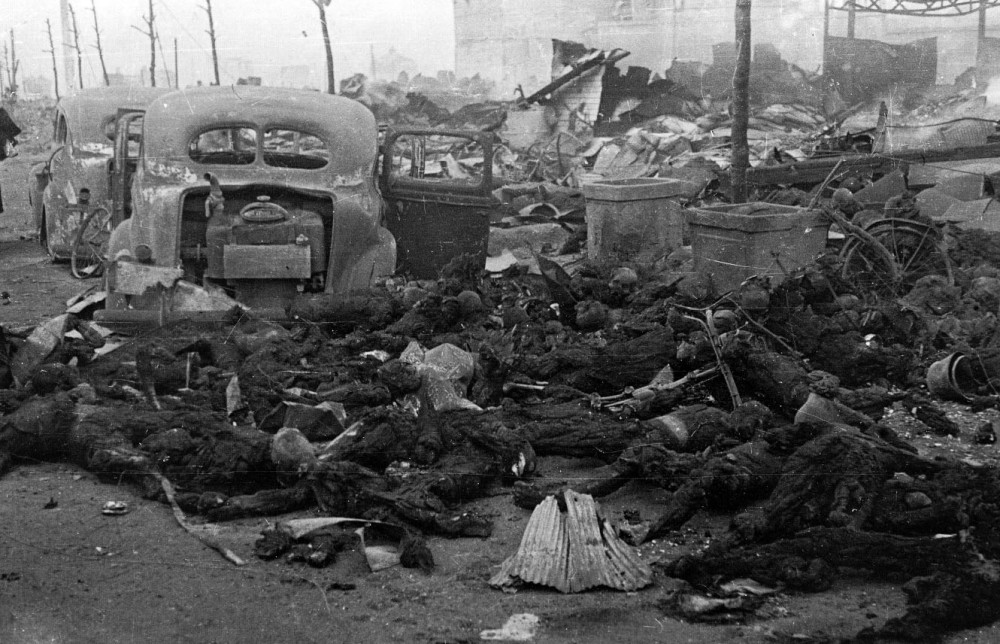
Charred remains of Japanese civilians after Operation Meetinghouse, photographed by Kōyō Ishikawa

The US Strategic Bombing Survey later estimated that nearly 88,000 people died, 41,000 were injured, and over a million residents lost their homes in the 9–10 March raid alone. The Tokyo Fire Department estimated a higher death toll of 97,000 killed and 125,000 wounded. The Tokyo Metropolitan Police Department established a figure of 83,793 dead, 40,918 wounded, and 286,358 buildings and homes destroyed. Historian Richard Rhodes placed the death toll at over 100,000, injuries at a million, and homeless residents at a million. These casualty and damage figures could be low, according to Mark Selden:

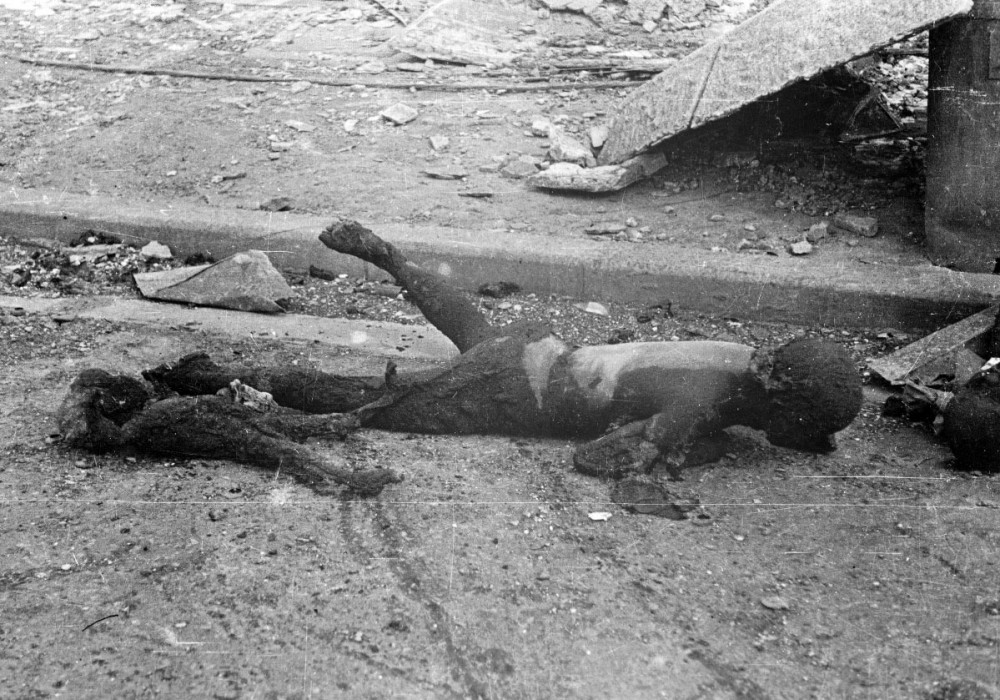
The charred body of a mother who was carrying a child on her back, photographed by Kōyō Ishikawa

The figure of roughly 100,000 deaths, provided by Japanese and American authorities, both of whom may have had reasons of their own for minimizing the death toll, seems to be arguably low in light of population density, wind conditions, and survivors' accounts. With an average of 103,000 inhabitants per square mile (400 inhabitants/ha) and peak levels as high as 135,000 inhabitants per square mile (520 inhabitants/ha), the highest density of any industrial city in the world, and with firefighting measures ludicrously inadequate to the task, 15.8 square miles (41 km^{2}) of Tokyo were destroyed on a night when fierce winds whipped the flames and walls of fire blocked tens of thousands fleeing for their lives. An estimated 1.5 million people lived in the burned out areas.

In his 1968 book, reprinted in 1990, historian Gabriel Kolko cited a figure of 125,000 deaths. Elise K. Tipton, a professor of Japan Studies, arrived at a rough range of 75,000 to 200,000 deaths. Donald L. Miller, citing Knox Burger, stated that there were "at least 100,000" Japanese deaths and "about one million" injured.

The wider strategic and area bombing campaign against Japan killed more than 300,000 people and injured an additional 400,000, mostly civilians.

== Postwar recovery ==
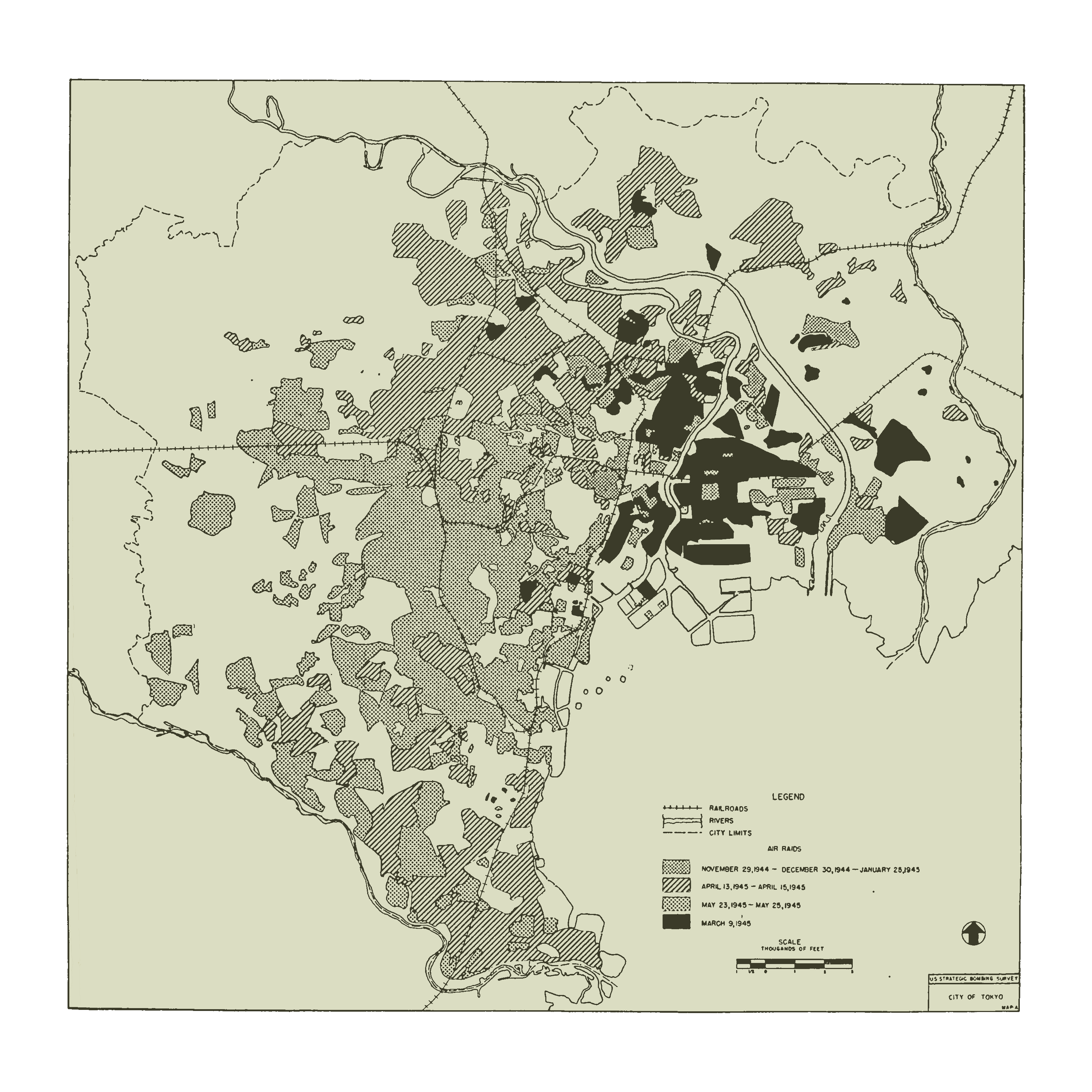
1947 U.S. military survey showing bomb-damaged areas of Tokyo

After the war, Tokyo struggled to rebuild. In 1945 and 1946, the city received a share of the national reconstruction budget roughly proportional to its amount of bombing damage (26.6%), but in successive years Tokyo saw this share dwindle. By 1949, Tokyo was given only 10.9% of the budget, at the same time that runaway inflation had significantly devalued the Japanese currency. Occupation authorities such as Joseph Dodge eventually stepped in and drastically cut back on Japanese government rebuilding programs, focusing instead on simply improving roads and transportation. Tokyo did not experience fast economic growth until the 1950s.

== Memorials ==
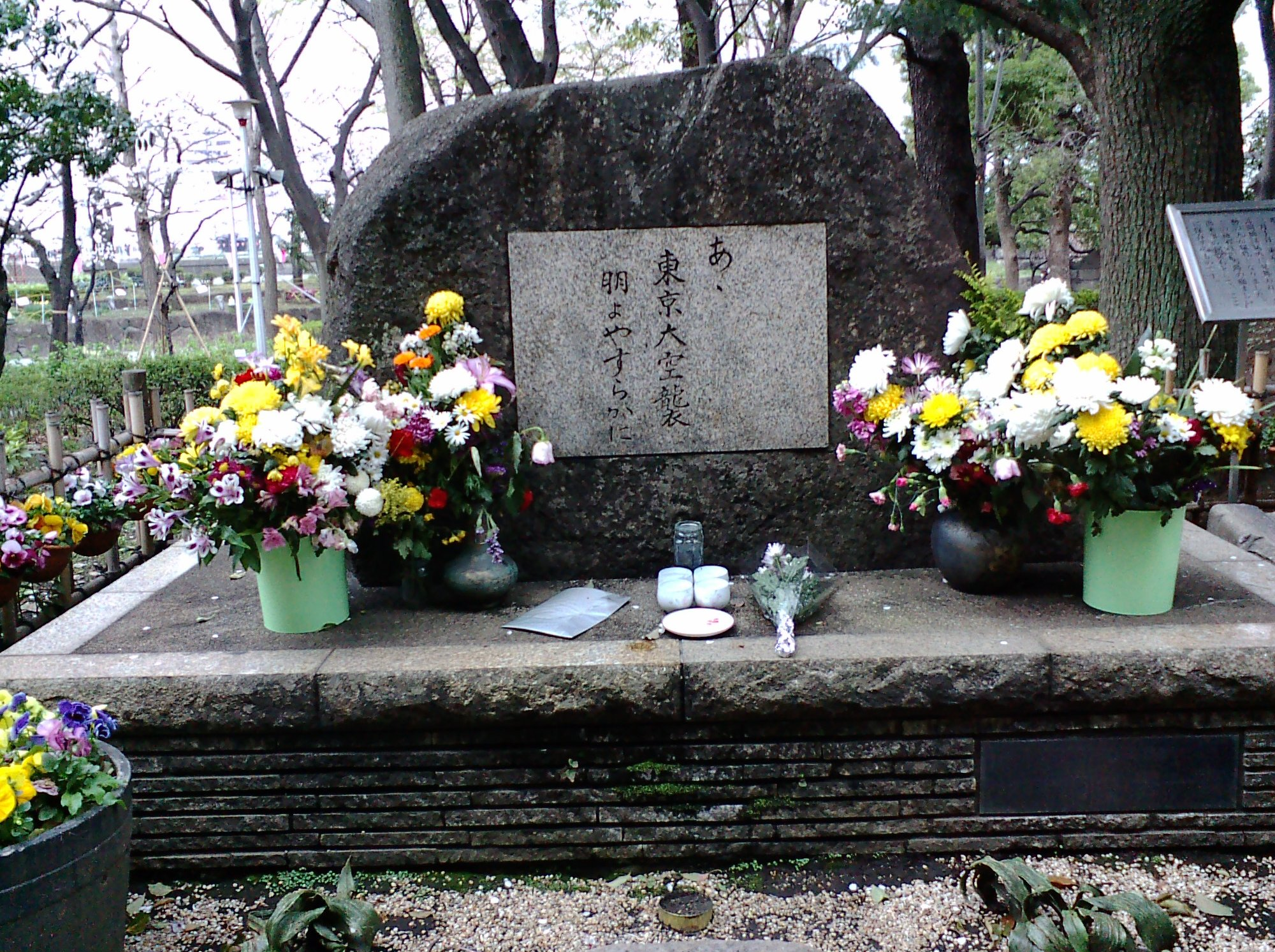
Cenotaph for 80,000 deceased citizens. Bombing of Tokyo during the Pacific War, Sumida Park, Taitō, Tokyo

Between 1948 and 1951 the ashes of 105,400 people killed in the attacks on Tokyo were interred at Sumida Ward in Yokoamicho Park. A memorial to the raids was opened in the park in March 2001. The park maintains a list people who died due to the bombings, made based on applications from the victims' families; this list had 81,273 names as of March 2020. Families who lost members in the bombings can submit applications to the government of Tokyo to have names of victims added to the list.

After the war, Japanese author Katsumoto Saotome, a survivor of the 10 March 1945 firebombing, helped start a library about the raid in Koto Ward called the Center of the Tokyo Raids and War Damage. The library contains documents and literature about the raid, along with survivor accounts collected by Saotome and the Association to Record the Tokyo Air Raid.

=== Memorials to American crewman ===
In addition to the memorials across Japan for Japanese civilians killed during the air raids, historian Archie Miyamoto has documented the existence of memorials in Japan dedicated to American bomber crews who were killed in action. One such memorial is in Higashimurayama, Tokyo, that commemorates the eleven American crewmen who were killed when their B-29 crashed on April 2, 1945. A local farmer, upon whose land the plane crashed, sought out the families of the fallen crewmen after the war and built a memorial in the form of a Heiwa Kannon Buddhist statue.

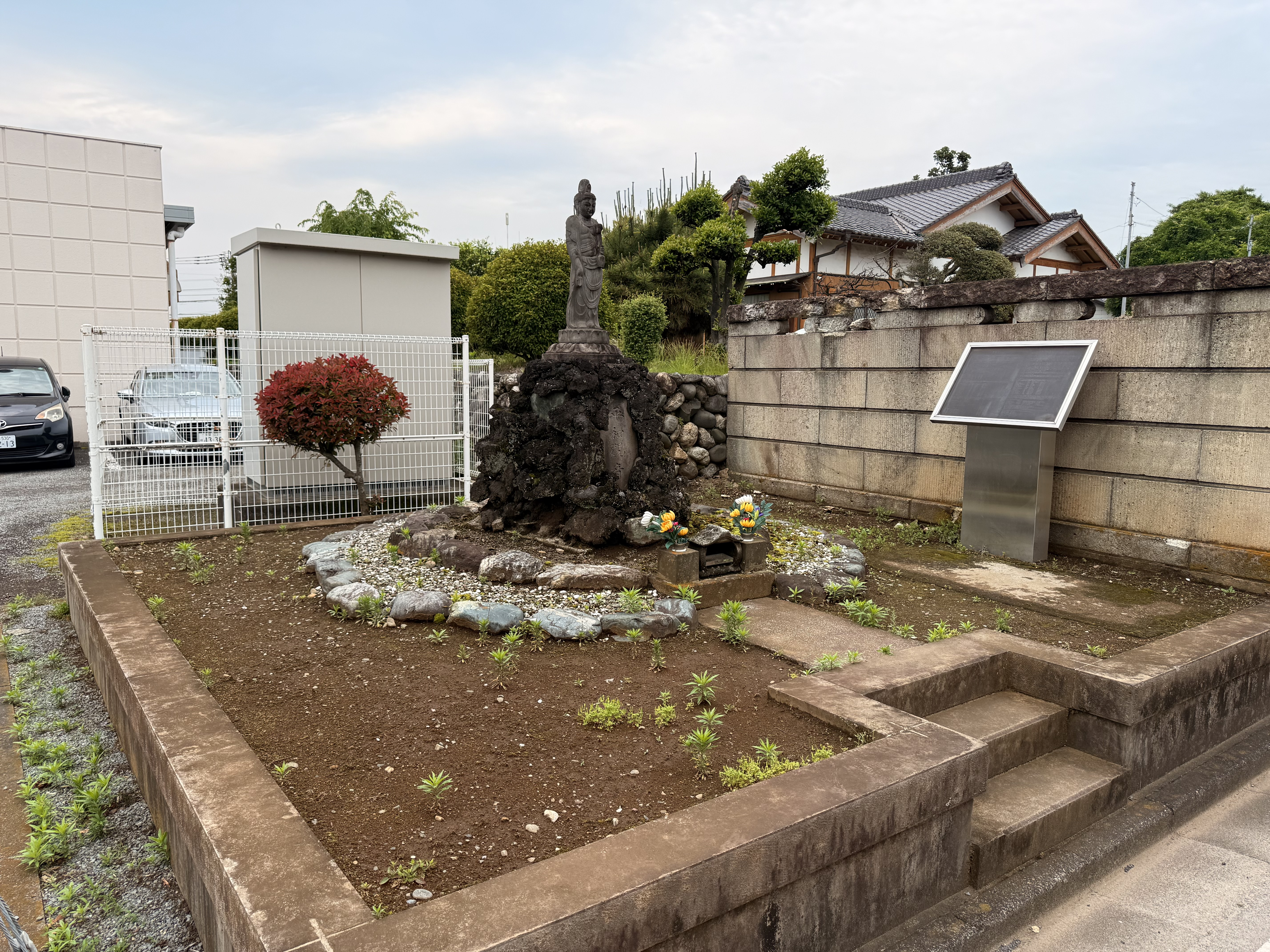
Heiwa Kannon B29 Crash Site Memorial

== Postwar Japanese politics ==
In 2007, 112 members of the Association for the Bereaved Families of the Victims of the Tokyo Air Raids brought a class action against the Japanese government, demanding an apology and 1.232 billion yen in compensation. Their suit charged that the Japanese government invited the raid by failing to end the war earlier, and then failed to help the civilian victims of the raids while providing considerable support to former military personnel and their families. The plaintiffs' case was dismissed at the first judgement in December 2009, and their appeal was rejected. The plaintiffs then appealed to the Supreme Court, which rejected their case in May 2013.

In 2013, during Japanese Prime Minister Shinzō Abe's second term, Abe's cabinet stated that the raids were "incompatible with humanitarianism, which is one of the foundations of international law", but also noted that it is difficult to argue whether the raids were illegal under the international laws of the time.

== Partial list of missions ==
=== B-29 ===
- 24 November 1944: 88 of 111 B-29s sent hit the Musashino aircraft factory on the rim of the city. Only 24 bomb the target while 64 bomb the dock and urban area due to cloud coverage.
- 27 November 1944: 62 B-29s hit the dock and urban area and 13 targets of opportunity.
- 29–30 November 1944: 29 B-29s launch an incendiary raid on urban-industrial areas, burning 2,773 structures.
- 3 December 1944: 73 B-29s bomb the Nakajima Aircraft Company factory in Musashino.
- 27 December 1944: 39 B-29s bomb the Musashino factory.
- 9 January 1945: 18 B-29s bomb the Musashino factory and 34 bomb the dock and urban area.
- 27 January 1945: 62 B-29s bomb the dock and urban area due to cloud cover.
- 10 February 1945: 84 B-29s bomb and badly damage a Japanese aircraft factory in Ota.
- 19 February 1945: 131 B-29s hit port and urban area.
- 25 February 1945: 172 B-29s dropping incendiaries destroy 28,000 buildings.
- 4 March 1945: 177 B-29s hit urban area since the main target was covered in clouds.
- 9 March 1945: 279 B-29s dropping incendiaries destroy 267,000 buildings; 25% of city (Operation Meetinghouse) killing some 100,000.
- 2 April 1945: 115 B-29s bomb the Nakajima aircraft factory before dawn.
- 3 April 1945: 68 B-29s bomb the Koizumi aircraft factory and urban areas in Tokyo.
- 7 April 1945: 101 B-29s bomb the Nakajima aircraft factory again, damaging it.
- 12 April 1945: 93 B-29s bomb the Nakajima factory and badly damage it.
- 13 April 1945: 327 B-29s bomb the arsenal area that night, killing 1,662.
- 15 April 1945: 109 B-29s bomb the urban area that night, killing 841 and destroying 50,000 buildings.
- 5 May 1945: A small force of B-29s drop aerial mines in Tokyo Bay as part of Operation Starvation
- 23 May 1945: 250 B-29s bomb the Yamanote area, killing 762.
- 25 May 1945: 464 B-29s bomb the Yamanote area, killing 3,352 and destroying 166,000 buildings according to the Metropolitan Police; Tokyo Station and the Meiji-built main building of the Imperial Palace among the casualties.
- 20 July 1945: 1 B-29 drops a Pumpkin bomb (bomb with same ballistics as the Fat Man nuclear bomb) through overcast. It was aimed at, but missed, the Imperial Palace.
- 8 August 1945: 60 B-29s bomb the aircraft factory and arsenal.
- 10 August 1945: 70 B-29s bomb the arsenal complex.

=== Other ===
16–17 February 1945: carrier-based aircraft, including dive bombers, escorted by Hellcat fighters attacked Tokyo. Over two days, over 1,500 American planes and hundreds of Japanese planes were in the air. "By the end of 17 February, more than five hundred Japanese planes, both on the ground and in the air, had been lost, and Japan's aircraft works had been badly hit. The Americans lost eighty planes."

18 August 1945: The last U.S. air combat casualty of the Pacific War occurred during mission 230 A-8, when two Consolidated B-32 Dominators of the 386th Bomb Squadron, 312th Bomb Group, launched from Yontan Airfield, Okinawa, for a photo reconnaissance run over Tokyo, Japan. Both bombers were attacked by several Japanese fighters of both the 302nd Naval Air Group at Atsugi and the Yokosuka Air Group that made 10 gunnery passes. Japanese IJNAS aces Sadamu Komachi and Saburō Sakai were part of this attack. The B-32 piloted by 1st Lt. John R. Anderson, was hit at 20,000 feet; cannon fire knocked out the number two (port inner) engine, and three crew were injured, including Sgt. Anthony J. Marchione, 19, of the 20th Reconnaissance Squadron, who took a 20 mm hit to the chest and died 30 minutes later. Tail gunner Sgt. John Houston destroyed one attacker. The lead bomber, 42-108532, "Hobo Queen II", piloted by 1st Lt. James Klein, was not seriously damaged but the second, 42-108578, lost an engine, had the upper turret knocked out of action, and partially lost rudder control. Both bombers landed at Yontan Airfield just past ~1800 hrs. having survived the last air combat of the Pacific war. The following day, propellers were removed from Japanese aircraft as part of the surrender agreement. Marchione was buried on Okinawa on 19 August, his body being returned to his Pottstown, Pennsylvania home on 18 March 1949. He was interred in St. Aloysius Old Cemetery with full military honors. "Hobo Queen II" was dismantled at Yonton Airfield following a 9 September nosegear collapse and damage during lifting and 42-108578, was scrapped at Kingman, Arizona after the war.

== See also ==
- Evacuations of civilians in Japan during World War II
