= List of Japanese films of 1982 =

A list of films released in Japan in 1982 (see 1982 in film).

== Box-office ranking ==
Rank	Title	Director	Cast	Box office
1	Sailor Suit and Machine Gun	Shinji Sōmai	Hiroko Yakushimaru	¥2.3 billion
2	High Teen Boogie	Toshio Masuda	Masahiko Kondō	¥1.8 billion
3	The Great Japanese Empire	Toshio Masuda (director)	Tetsurō Tamba	¥1.4 billion
4	Mobile Suit Gundam: Encounters in Space	Yoshiyuki Tomino	Tōru Furuya	¥1.29 billion
5	Doraemon: Nobita and the Haunts of Evil	Hideo Nishimaki	Nobuyo Ōyama	¥1.22 billion

== List of films ==
Title	Director	Cast	Genre	Notes
1982
A Ilha dos Amores	Paulo Rocha			Co-produced with Portugal and entered into the 1982 Cannes Film Festival
Asuka e soshite mada minu koe	Ryo Kinoshita	Keiko Takeshita, Tatsuro Nadaka, Shinya Owada	—N/a	
Bright Lake	Shinobu Hashimoto	Reiko Nanjo, Daisuke Ryu, Tomoko Hoshino	—N/a	
Doraemon: Nobita and the Haunts of Evil	Hideo Nishimaki	Nobuyo Ōyama	—N/a	Animated feature
Exchange Students	Nobuhiko Obayashi	Satomi Kobayashi		
Fall Guy	Kinji Fukasaku	Morio Kazama; Keiko Matsuzaka		Japan Academy Prize for Best Film
Farewell to the Land	Mitsuo Yanagimachi			Entered into the 32nd Berlin International Film Festival
The Flight of Dragons	Jules Bass, Katsuhisa Yamada		Animation	
The Gate of Youth (Part II)	Koreyoshi Kurahara	Kōichi Satō; Kaoru Sugita	Drama	
The Go Masters	Junya Sato, Duan Ji-Shun	Rentarō Mikuni, Sun Dao-Lin, Misako Konno	—N/a	Japanese-Chinese co-production
Goggle V Movie			Sci-fi for children	
Hai tiin bugi	Toshio Masuda	Masahiko Kondo, Yoshio Nomura, Toshihiko Tahara	—N/a	
Hearts and Flowers for Tora-san	Yoji Yamada	Kiyoshi Atsumi	Comedy	29th in the Otoko wa Tsurai yo series
Kaibutsu-kun–Demon no ken	Hiroshi Fukutomi		—N/a	Animated feature
The Last Unicorn	Arthur Rankin Jr., Jules Bass	Alan Arkin, Jeff Bridges, Mia Farrow, Tammy Grimes, Robert Klein, Angela Lansbury, Christopher Lee, Keenan Wynn, Paul Frees, René Auberjonois	Animated fantasy	
Long Run–Rongu ran	Ruiko Yoshida	Toshiyuki Nagashima, Kazuko Kato, Hiromitsu Suzuki	—N/a	
Karate Cop	Yusuke Watanabe	Tetsuya Takeda, Hisayo Ariga, Noboru Nakaya	—N/a	
Kidnap Blues	Shinpei Asai	Kazuyoshi Tamori, Yosuke Yamashita, Yumiko Fujita	—N/a	
The Longest Tunnel	Shiro Moritani	Ken Takakura, Sayuri Yoshinaga, Tomokazu Miura	—N/a	
Mobile Suit Gundam III: Encounter in Space			Anime for Children	
Ninja Hattori-kun–Ninnin ninpo eniki no maki	Hiroshi Sasagawa		—N/a	Animated feature
Nomugi Pass II	Satsuo Yamamoto	Keiko Takeshita, Tatsuro Nadaka, Shinya Owada	—N/a	
The Southern Cross	Seiji Maruyama	Atsuo Nakamura, John Howard, Stuart Wilson	—N/a	
Tekuno porisu 21 C	Masashi Matsumoto		—N/a	
Tora-san, the Expert	Yoji Yamada	Kiyoshi Atsumi	Comedy	30th in the Otoko wa Tsurai yo series
The Tower of Lillies	Tadashi Imai	Komaki Kurihara, Yuko Kotegawa, Yoshiko Tanaka	—N/a	
The Wizard of Oz			Anime	
The Woman with the Red Hat	Tatsumi Kumashiro	Toshiyuki Nagashima, Kristina van Eyck	Drama	Japanese-West German co-production
Yaju-deka	Eiichi Kudo			Entered into the 33rd Berlin International Film Festival

== See also ==
- 1982 in Japan
- 1982 in Japanese television
