= Kōyō Ishikawa =

Japanese photographer

Kōyō Ishikawa (石川 光陽, Ishikawa Kōyō; July 5, 1904 – December 26, 1989) was a Japanese photographer.

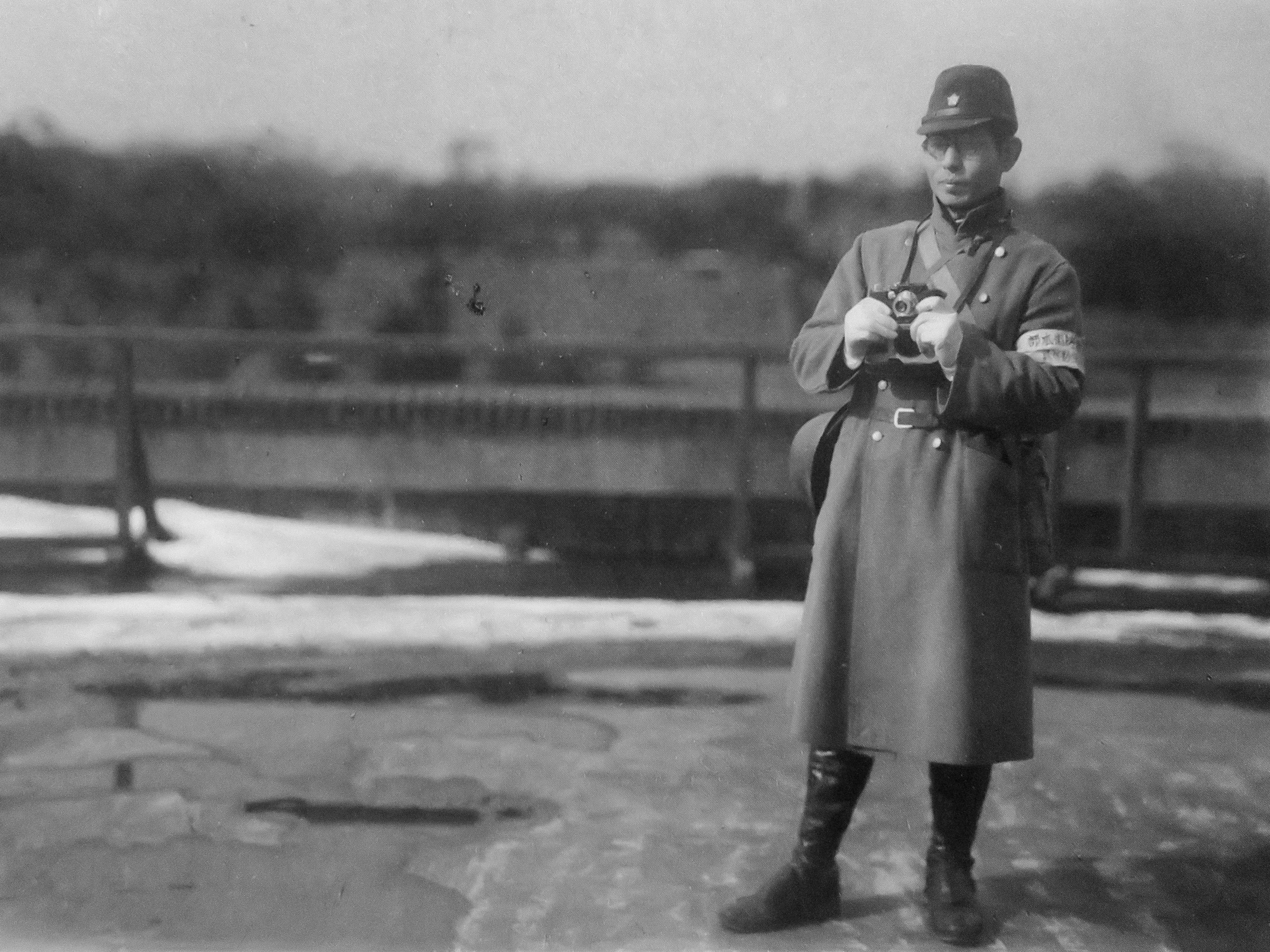
Ishikawa with his Leica camera

As an officer of the Tokyo Metropolitan Police Department, he was one of the few known photographers of the immediate aftermath of the U.S. bombings of Tokyo in World War II, since strict regulations prohibited civilians from taking pictures of war damage.

== Gallery ==
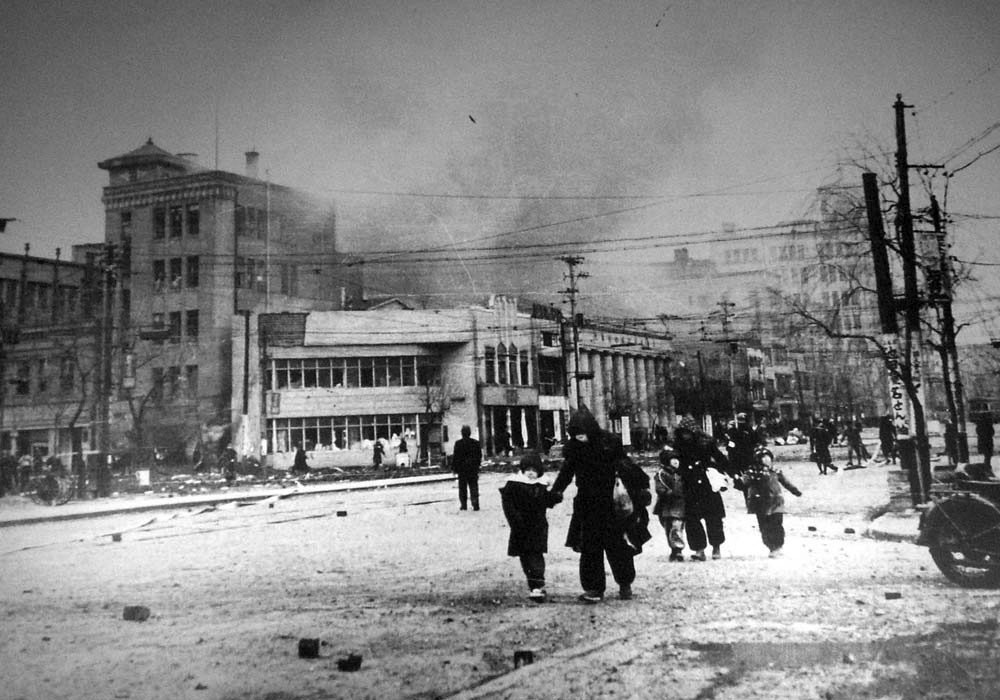
Evacuees in the bombing

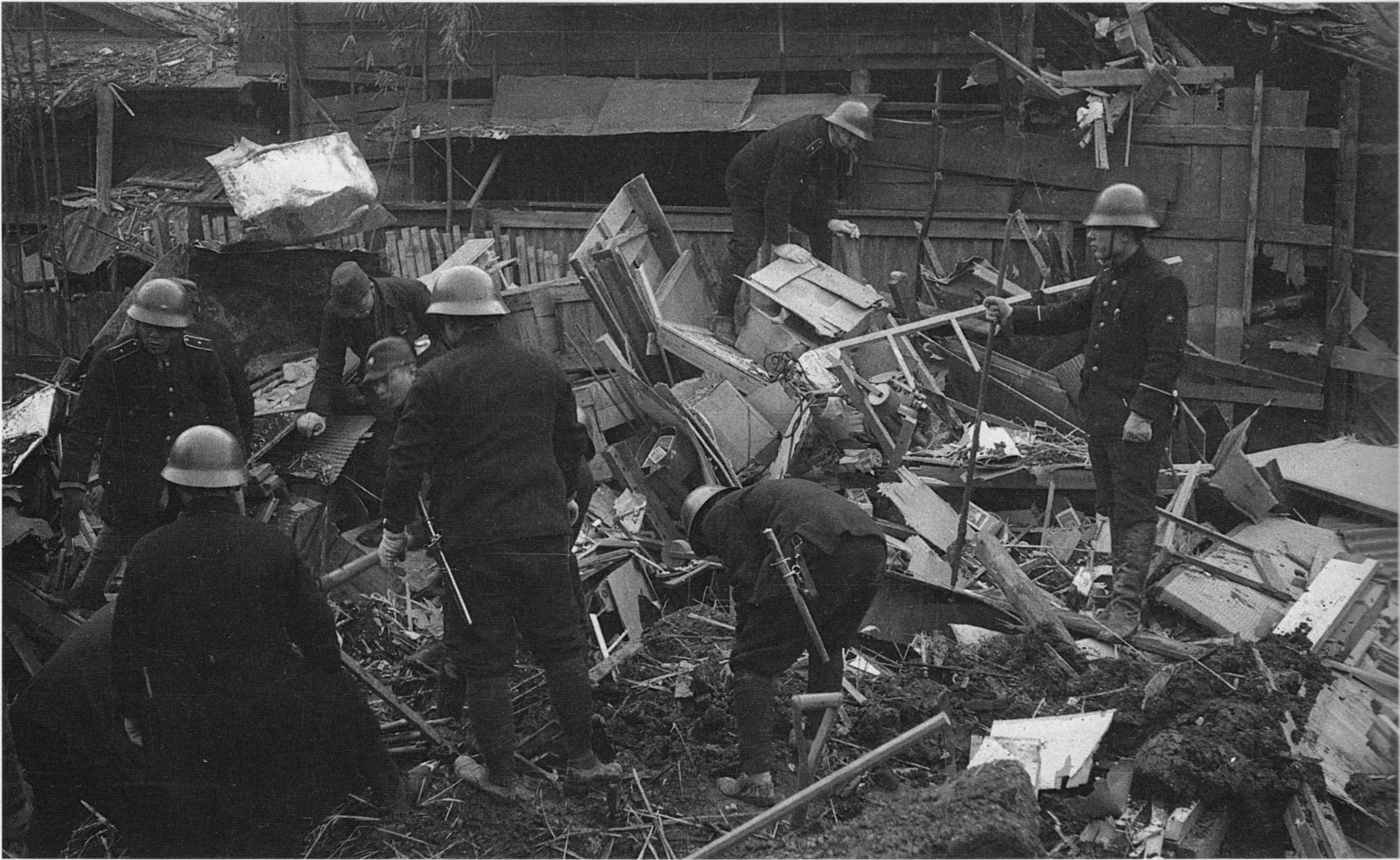
Rescue workers after the bombing

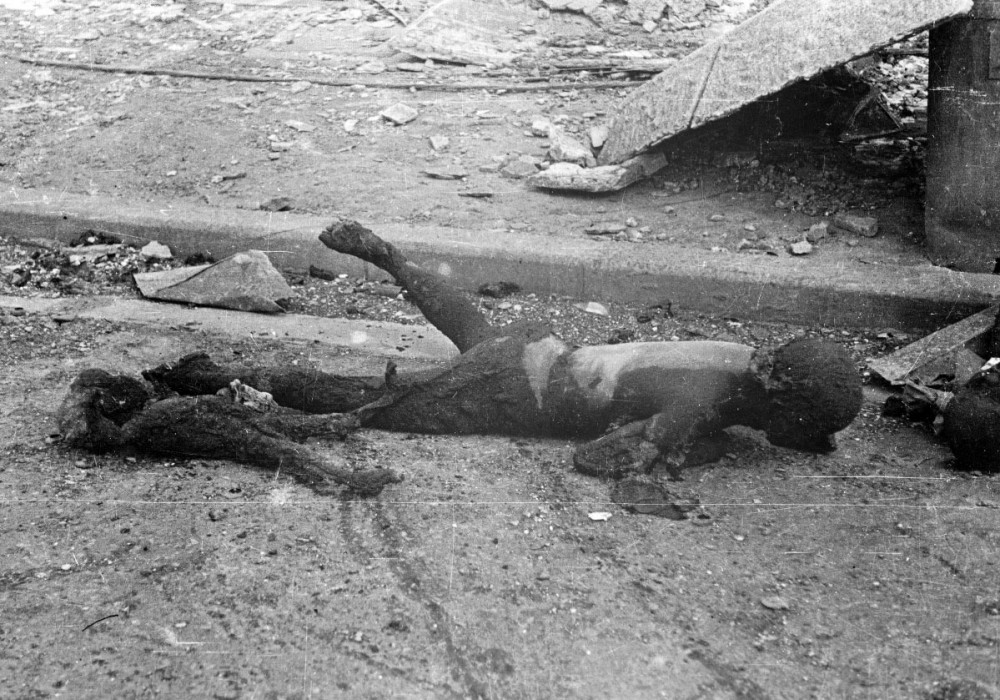
Victims of the bombing

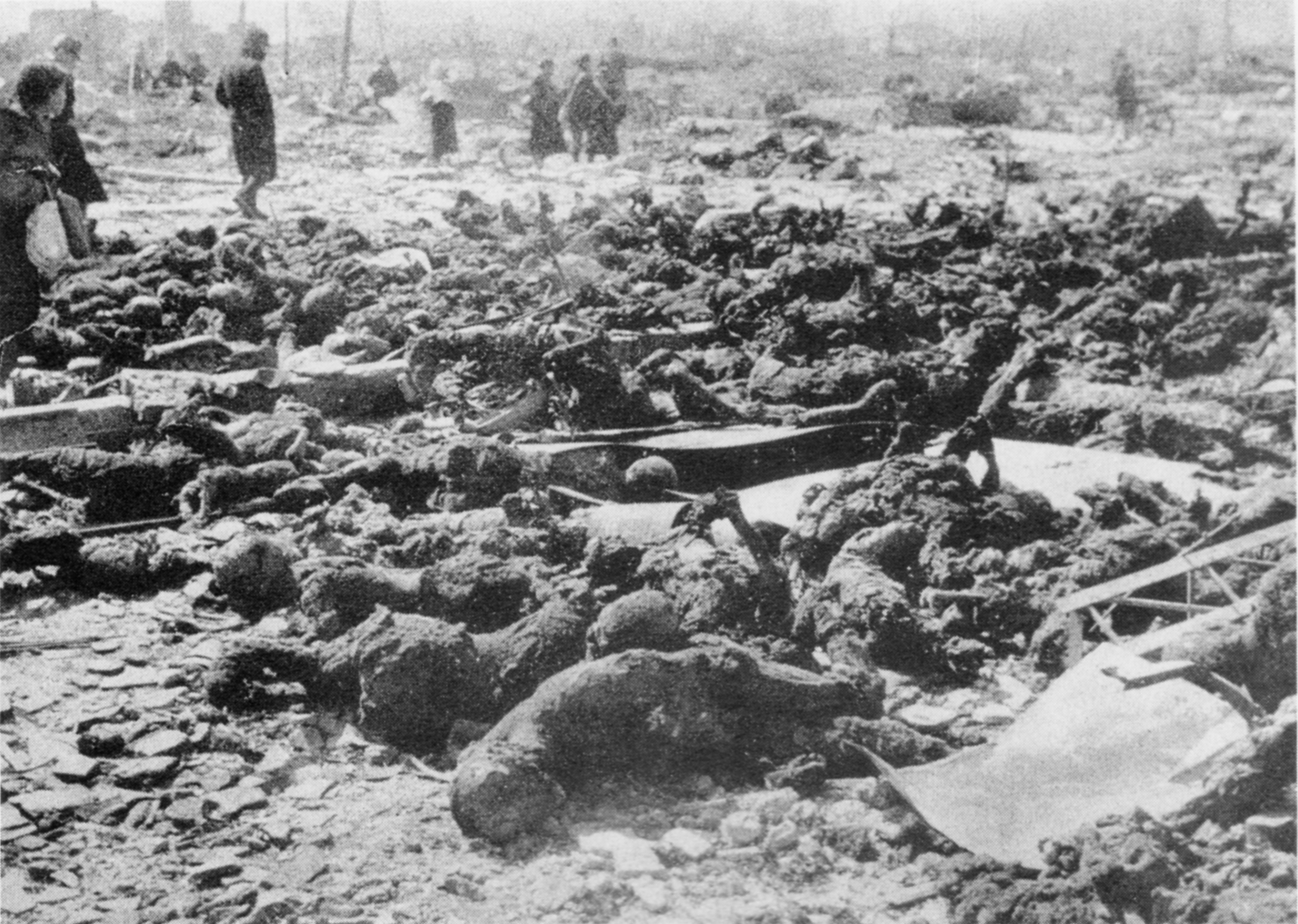

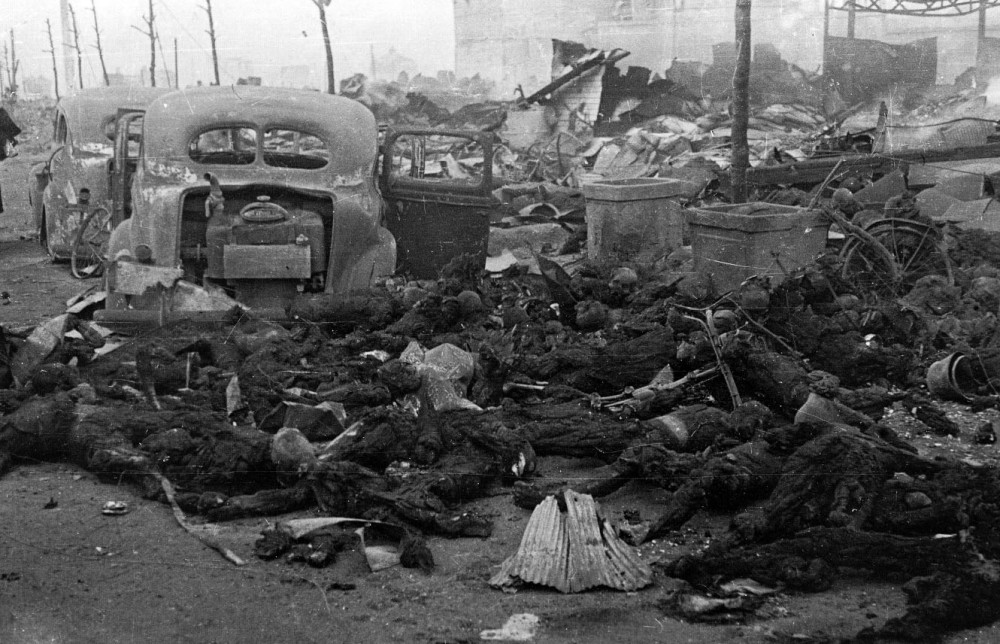

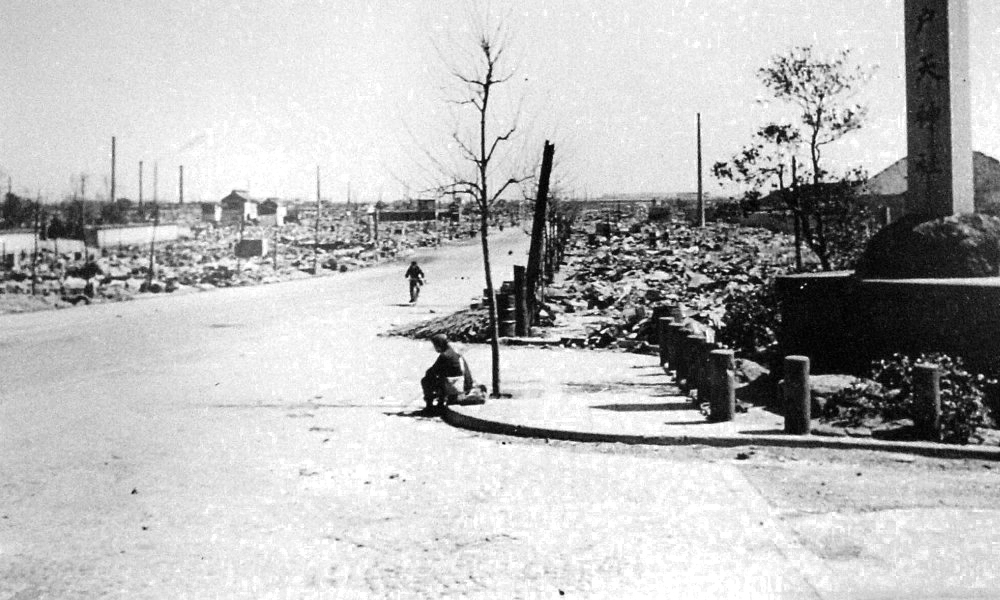
City in ruins after the bombing

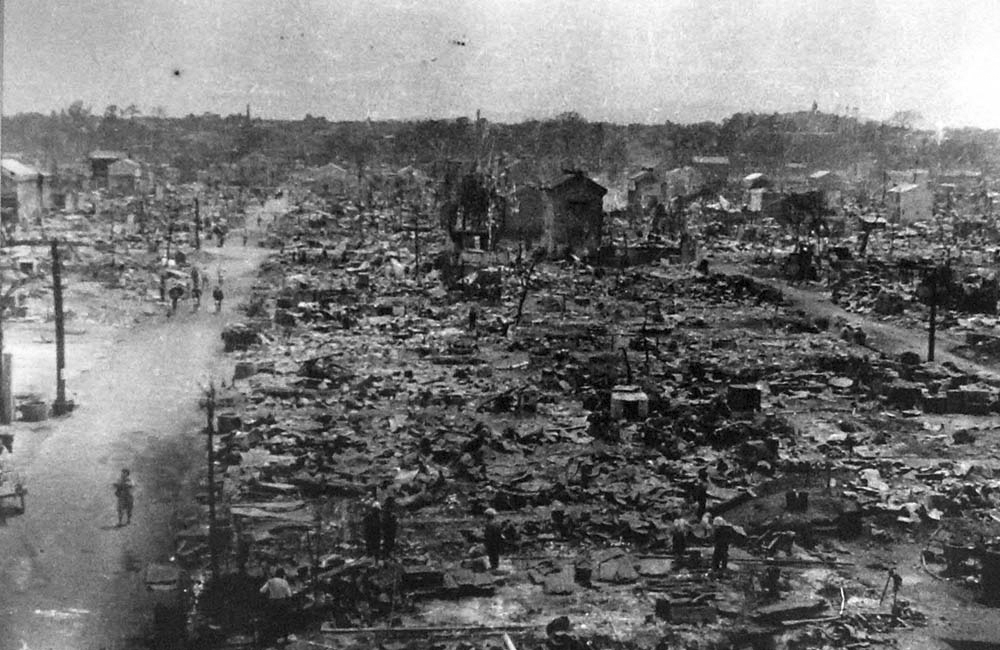

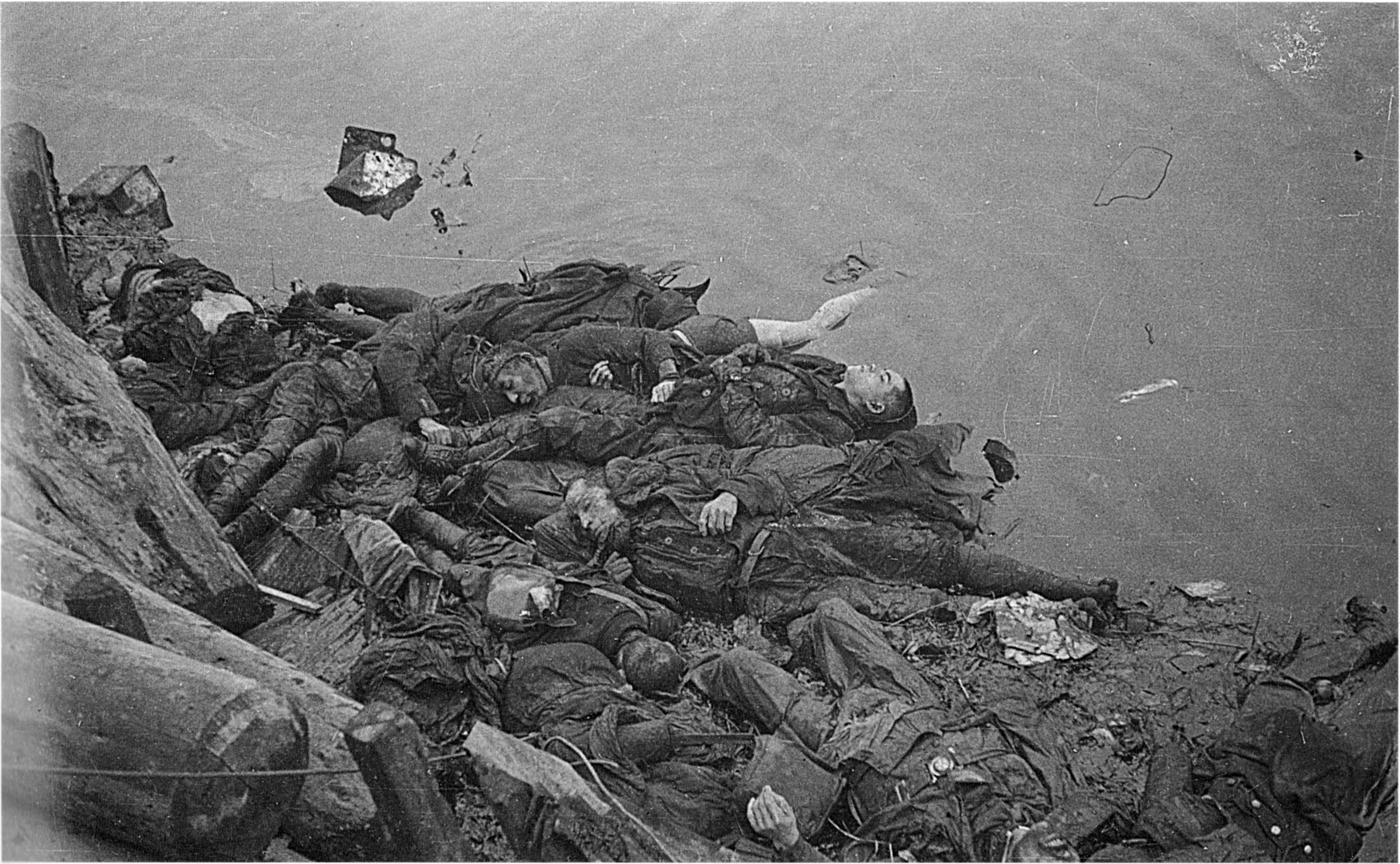
Bodies floating in the Sumida River

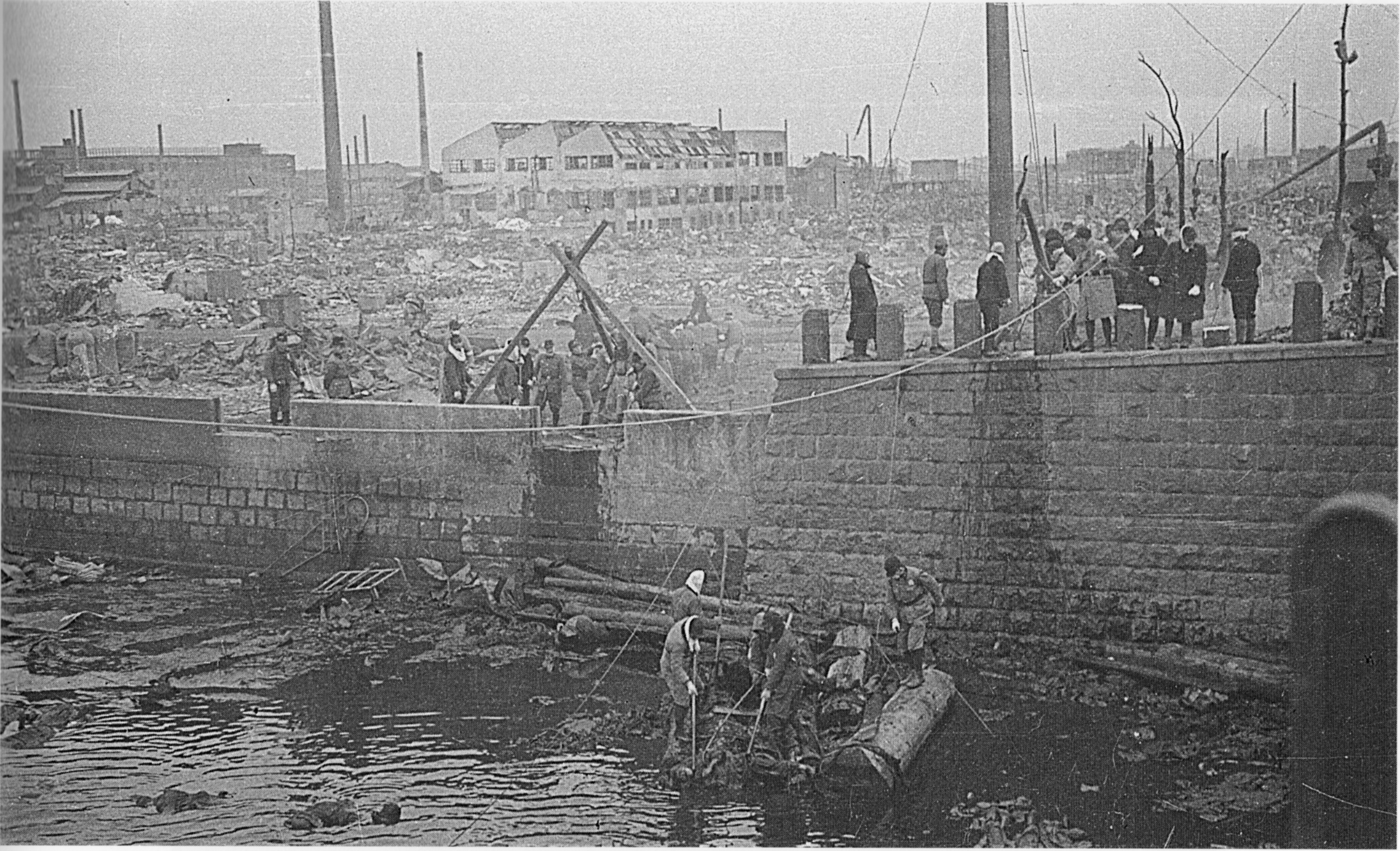
Salvage operation in Honjo

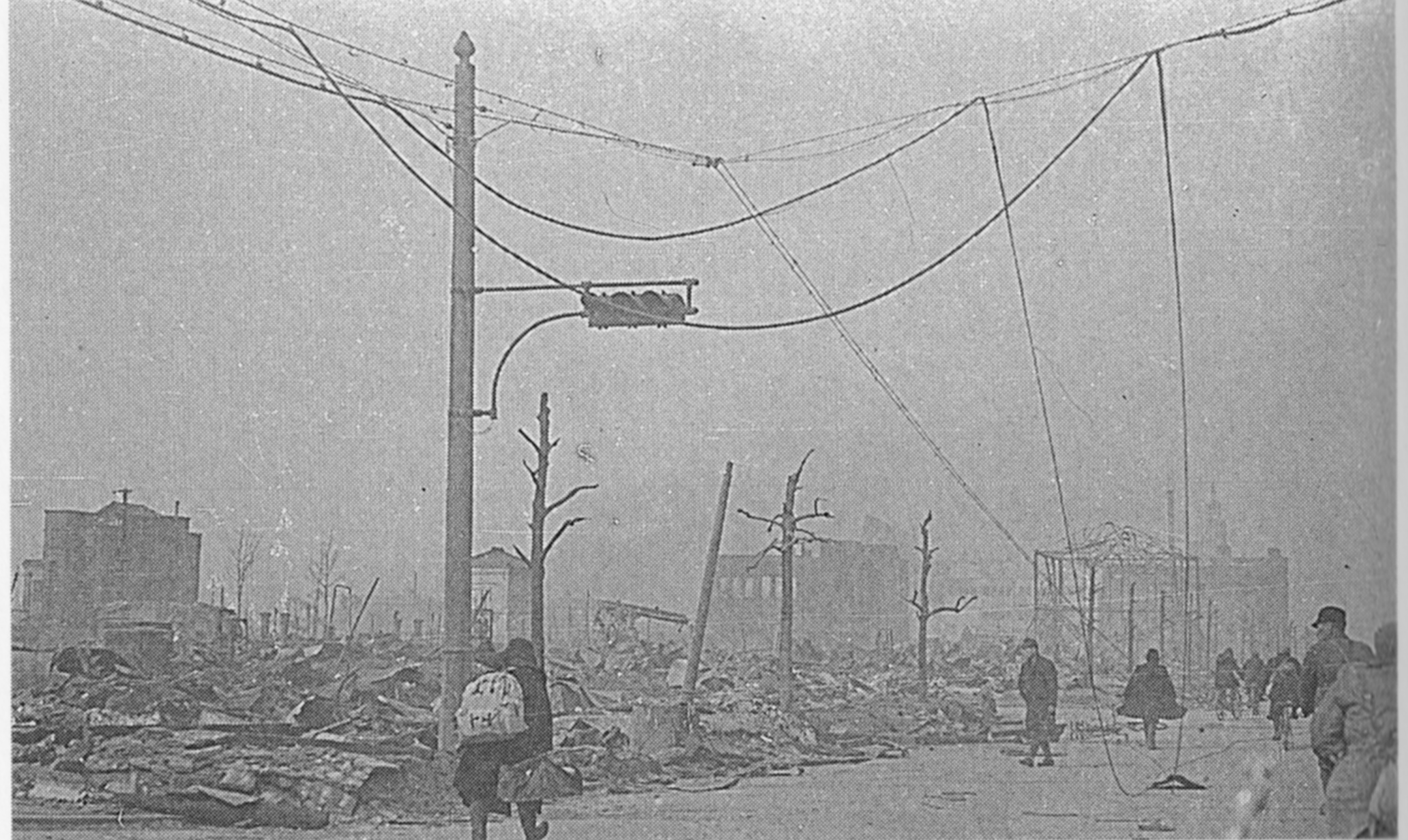
Street view of Asakusa

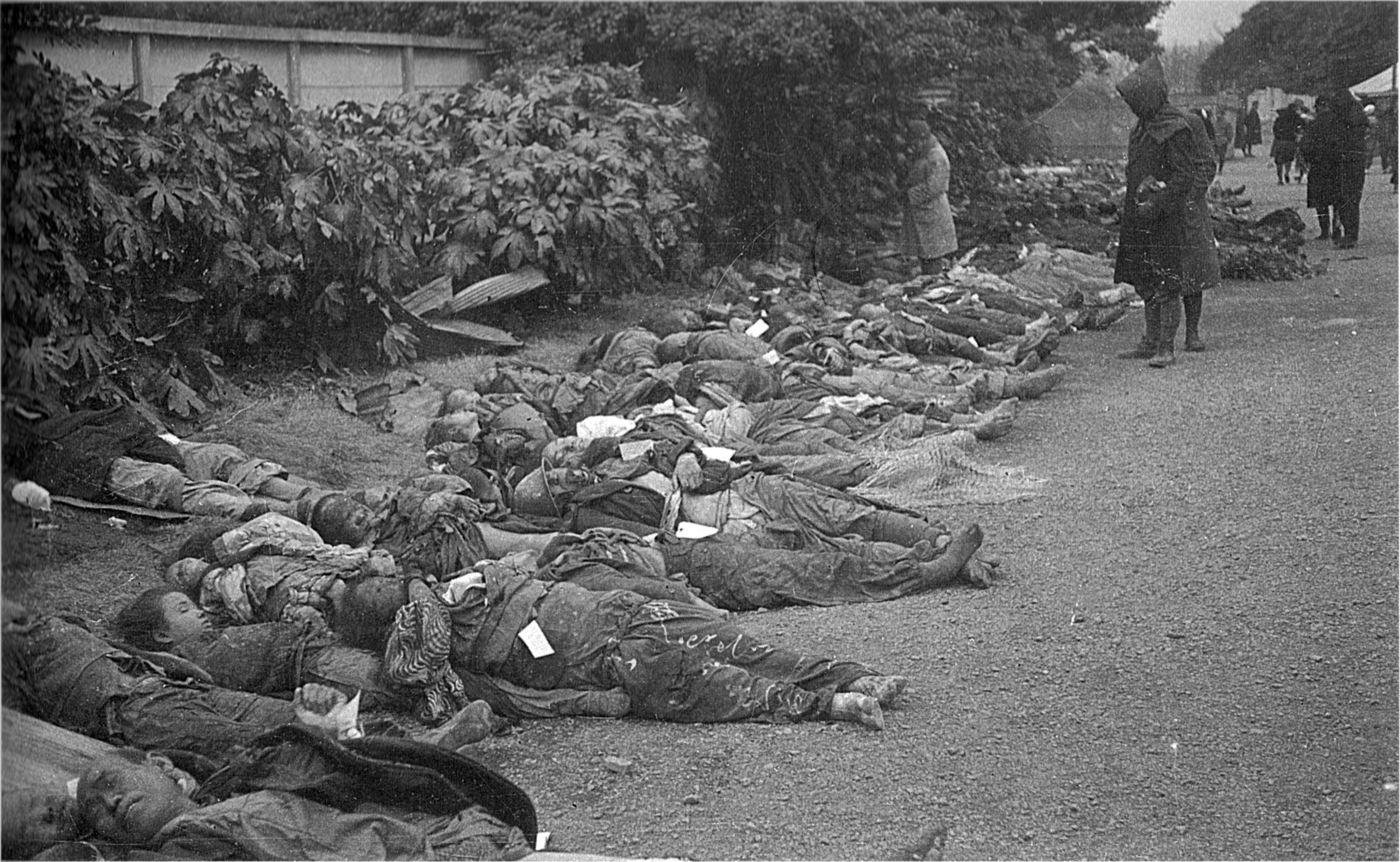
Bodies in Ueno Park

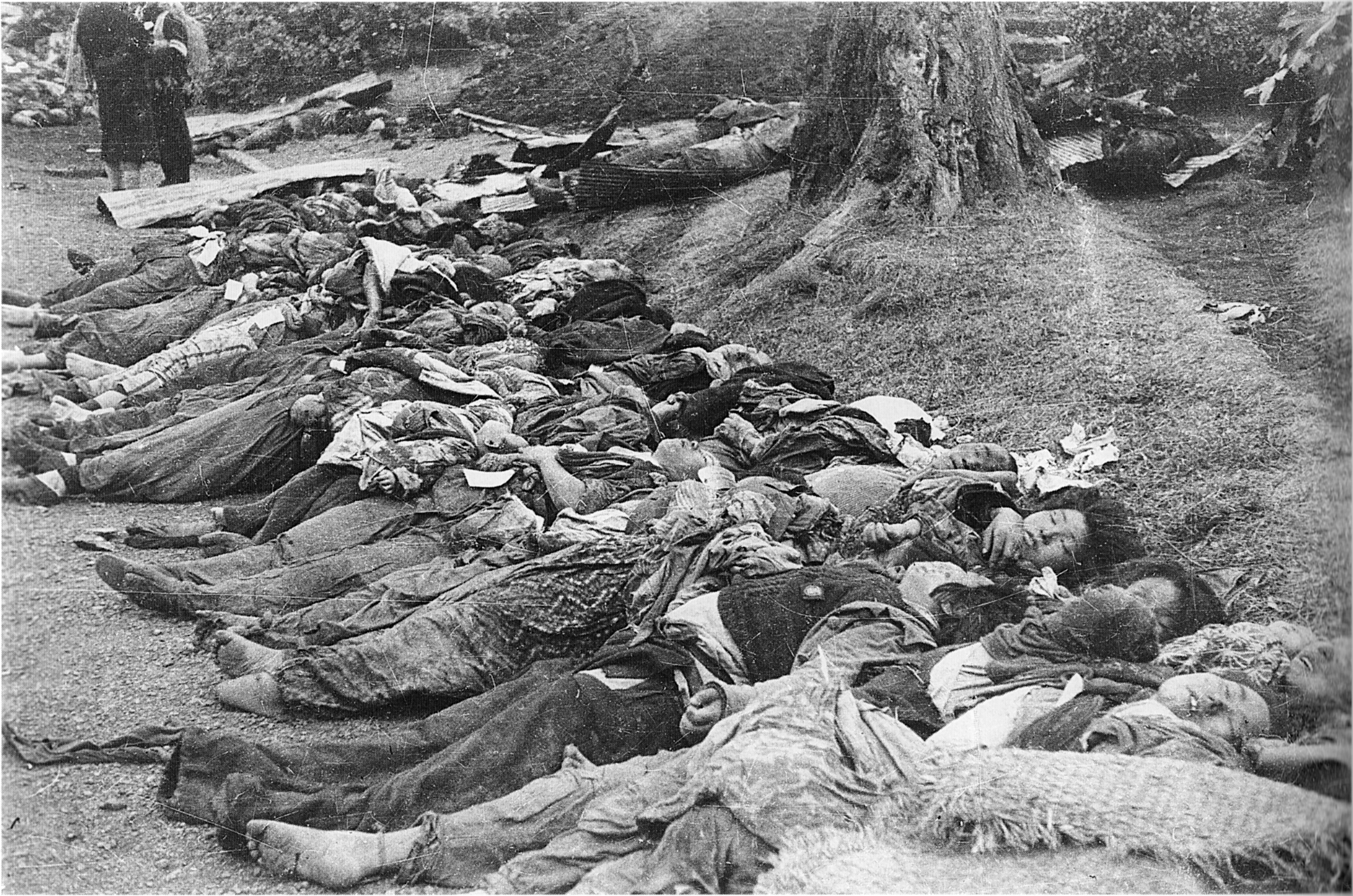

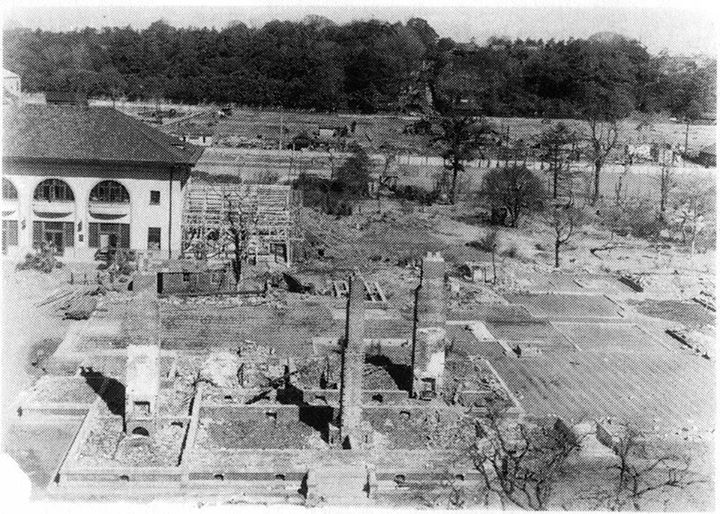
Waseda University after the bombing

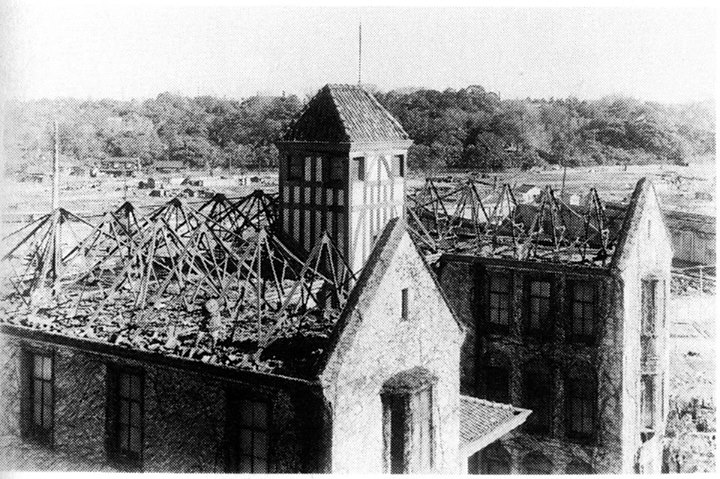

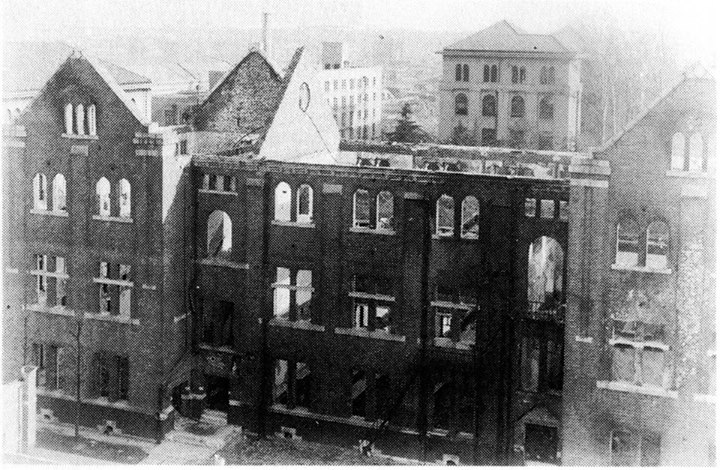
