= Mitsuru Sugaya =

Japanese manga artist

Mitsuru Sugaya すがやみつる
- Born: September 20, 1950 (age 76) Fuji, Shizuoka Prefecture
- Area: Manga artist
- Notable works: Kamen Rider; Game Center Arashi; Konnichiwa Maikon
- Awards: 1983 Shogakukan Manga Award - Children category

Mitsuru Sugaya (すがやみつる, Sugaya Mitsuru; originally 菅谷 充, born September 20, 1950) is a Japanese manga artist, novelist, an author of instructional comics, and a racing writer. Sugaya wrote and illustrated Game Center Arashi, a manga series based on video games. He also drew a manga tied to the Japanese Spider-Man television series from the 1970s and also drew the manga adaptations of all Kamen Rider series from Ichigo to Stronger.
