= Game Center Arashi =

Japanese manga and television series

- Cover of the 2000 reprint of first manga volume

ゲームセンターあらし (Gēmu Sentā Arashi)
- Genre: Action
- Manga
- Written by: Mitsuru Sugaya
- Published by: Shogakukan
- Magazine: CoroCoro Comic
- Original run: 1978 – 1984
- Volumes: 17
- Anime television series
- Directed by: Tameo Ogawa (chief)
- Produced by: Hidehiko Taihei (NTV); Seidamo Kotama (Shin-Ei Animation)
- Music by: Kōji Makaino
- Studio: Shin-Ei Animation
- Original network: NTV
- Original run: April 5, 1982 – September 27, 1982
- Episodes: 26

Game Center Arashi (ゲームセンターあらし, Gēmu Sentā Arashi) is a Japanese manga by Mitsuru Sugaya, which ran in CoroCoro Comic from 1978 to 1984. It focus on Arashi Ishino, a young gamer whose life revolves around video games. The manga, which is one of the earliest Japanese video game-themed comics, sold over 5 million copies. The series was adapted as a popular anime television show that aired in 1982 in Japan on Mondays from 7:00 pm to 7:30 pm.; and in Hong Kong.

In Japanese, the word "Arashi" means "storm". In Hong Kong, the show aired under the title 電子神童, which translates to "Electronic Prodigy". The series was considered iconic in Asia, since it came at a time when the public was being exposed to video games for the first time. The manga and TV series opened the imagination and possibilities of what gaming entertainment was about, while boosting its popularity as a new phenomenon.

== Story ==
The story is about a young boy named Arashi Ishino who is obsessed with video games. He would spend all his time trying to beat the games and conquer the local arcades. He would meet competitors like Satoru Daimonji and Ishii, who would try to out match him with higher scores. At a certain point in each episode, he would display his special skill of unleashing a top which will spin so fast that both the top and his hands would catch on fire. On release, the spin would land on or near the cabinet panels, turning the ordinary button into a turbo button thus giving him a major advantage. His appearance is known for being bucktoothed, and he always wears a hat labeled "Arashi" with a picture of a sprited alien.

Game Center Arashi was the first animation with a gamer as the lead character and have the plot revolve around life with competitive gaming. Some of the games featured in the show include Space Invaders, Breakout, Galaxian, though they were not explicitly named. Some of Arashi's gaming techniques even have special names like "Blazed Top", "Vacuum Hurricane Shot", "Fish Stance".

== Characters ==
Arashi Ishino (石野あらし, Ishino Arashi) Voiced by: Satomi Majima
Satoru Daimonji (大文字さとる, Daimonji Satoru) Voiced by: Eiko Yamada
Ippeita Tsukikage (月影一平太, Tsukikage Ippeita) Voiced by: Kenichi Ogata

== Anime ==
=== Staff ===
Function	Names
Director	Tameo Ogawa
Screenwriter	Soji Yoshikawa
Character Design	Mitsuru Sugiyama
Animator	Kazuyuki Okaseko
Song Writer	Koji Makaino
Opening Theme Song Performer	Ichirou Mizuki
Ending Theme Song Performer	Satomi Mashima

=== Original broadcast ===
Broadcast day	Episodes
1982/4/5	1. Defeat the big computer!!
1982/4/12	2. Super secret skill!! Scene of flame
1982/4/19	3. It came out!! Necessary shooting munsaruto
1982/4/26	4. The heart of love burns in the game
1982/5/3	5. Decisive battle!! Guarantee comb un
1982/5/10	6. Destruction!! Alien of fear
1982/5/17	7. Intense it is painful!! Carious tooth alien
1982/5/24	8. It is game of the man!! Eye Kawahara of rhinoceros
1982/5/31	9. Certain Victory! TV Game Heaven
1982/6/7	10. Dracula who reanimates
1982/6/14	11. To withstand the super intensive training of death and be able to pull out!!
1982/6/21	12. TV game spy large maneuvers
1982/6/28	13. Why super boin becomes matter of concern
1982/7/5	14. Unexpected!! Ton men Daio puzzle
1982/7/12	15. Sneak away from the black hole!!
1982/7/19	16. The coming out of Arashi's tooth!!
1982/7/26	17. The younger brother was born!
1982/8/2	18. High treason point!! Surfing game!!
1982/8/9	19. The hamburger already the large quantity
1982/8/16	20. Mystery! Slow residence
1982/8/23	21. It is Summer! It is the game! It is lodging together!
1982/8/30	22. Good-bye you take!?
1982/9/6	23. Fight!! Game soldier Arashi
1982/9/13	24. SOS from heaven Part-I
1982/9/20	25. SOS from heaven Part-II
1982/9/27	26. Arashi's enemy is Arashi?!

== Additional versions and appearances ==
In 1999, the series spawned a PlayStation novel called Game Center Arashi R. In 2004, Microsoft Tokyo used the character of Arashi as a mascot to boost Xbox sales and image.

In 2006, the Let's! TV Play Classic series of plug and plays used Arashi as a mascot.

== See also ==
- Arcade Gamer Fubuki - A 1998 manga which reused the concept of a powerful gamer in the arcades.
- Hi Score Girl - A 2010 manga which revolves around the life of a gamer and the arcade gaming scene.
