= Akiko Chubachi =

Japanese beauty pageant contestant

- 中鉢 明子
- Born: 18 February 1982 (age 44); Yokohama, Kanagawa Prefecture
- Children: 1

Akiko Chubachi (中鉢 明子, Chubachi Akiko) (born February 18, 1982) assumed the duties of Miss Universe Japan 2007, after originally being the second runner-up. She became Miss Universe Japan after the winner, Riyo Mori, claimed the Miss Universe crown and first runner-up, Rei Hamada, turned the title down. Akiko is a graduate of Tamagawa University and has an elementary school teacher's certificate. She has travelled to 30 countries on her own doing volunteer work. She is a model and stands 5 ft 8 in (173 cm).
