= Yamaha Bravo =

Snowmobile manufactured in Japan

Bravo
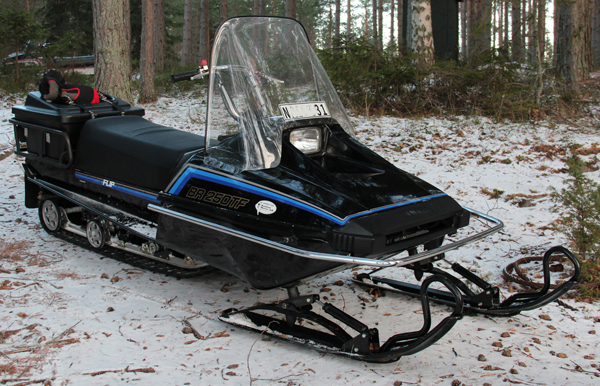
- 1989 Yamaha BR 250 TF
- Product type: Snowmobile
- Produced by: Yamaha Motors
- Country: Japan
- Introduced: 1982
- Discontinued: 2011

The Yamaha Bravo was a snowmobile manufactured by Yamaha Motor Company for 30 years, from 1982 to 2011. a movement to cleaner machines persuaded Yamaha to stop producing the snowmobile after the 2011 model.

== History ==
It was first launched in 1982 with a 249cc single cylinder two-stroke engine powering a 98 inch(length)x 15 inch(width)x .75 inch (paddle) track. In 1987 there came an option to replace the 98 inch long track with a 136 inch long track or with a 102-inch track. This track allowed the Bravo to float on the snow extremely well and appealed much to trappers and beginners on the sled. The Short track versions of the Bravo would do around 70 km/h and the long track would do around 55 km/h. Later Yamaha swapped the 249cc engine for a 246cc engine but little else changed and almost all parts were interchangeable.

In the late 1990s Yamaha removed both short track models from the market and only the 136 inch track was available. The short tracked model of the Bravo weighed about 330 lbs and the long track version weighed just over 370 lbs.

The Yamaha Bravo was particularly popular in remote villages in the Arctic, particularly Nunavut, as they are known to be tough and reliable, and require little maintenance.
