= Rio Hirai =

Japanese TV announcer (born 1982)

- 平井 理央
- Born: November 15, 1982 (age 43); Nishitokyo, Tokyo, Japan
- Occupations: TV actress and announcer
- Spouse: Hiroya Mitsutani (m. 2012; div. 2022)
- Children: 1
- Website: dejaneiro.jp

Rio Hirai (平井 理央, Hirai Rio; born November 15, 1982) is a Japanese TV actress and announcer who is represented by the talent agency DeJaneiro.

== Filmography ==
=== Television and radio ===
Year	Title	Role	Network	Notes
1998	Oha Suta		TV Tokyo	
1998	Iwao Junko no Ko Komi Night		Nippon Cultural Broadcasting	
1999	Chō V.I.P.		Fuji TV	
2000	Uwasa no CM Girl		TBS	
2000	Idol Soken Efe		Fuji TV Two	
2000	Sugao no Idol		Sky PerfectTV!	
2000	J Document 750		Sky PerfectTV!	
2001	Shōnan Hatsukoi Monogatari: Tea Cups	Kotono Murase	TV Tokyo	
2002	Natsu Furusato Zekkōchō!		TV Asahi	
2003	Dōbutsu no Oisha-san	Moe Awaya	TV Asahi	
2014	Roosevelt Game	Shiho Hanabusa (president secretary)	TBS	
