= Genzō Kitazumi =

Japanese photographer

Genzō Kitazumi (北角 玄三, Kitazumi Genzō; 18 December 1898 – 12 March 1982) was an influential Japanese photographer. Kitazumi's work is characterized by manipulation of photographic process for aesthetic rather than representational or documentary effect. His pre-war work features the use of lith print process and solarization. Photograms feature frequently in his post-war work. Kitazumi is also noted for his pioneering work in the commercial use of color photographic processing and printing in Japan.

== Pre-war career ==
Kitazumi was born on 1898 in Shizuoka. He went to Keio school of commerce (慶応商業学校) but dropped out.

In 1920, Kitazumi was given a job as a temporary photographic assistant for Toshimo Mitsumura at the newly established Mitsumura Printing Company in Shibuya Kamihara-chō, Tokyo. In his memoirs, he wrote that his ambition during this period was to become a painter and that he was not interested in long-term employment at Mitsumura. Toshimo Mitsumura was one of the early pioneers of photography in Japan and had a relationship with the Army and Naval Ministries dating back to the Russo-Japanese War. Kitazumi was to continue working for Mitsumura until 1945.

Kitazumi's early photographic assignments included the trips to Karafuto (Sakhalin) and Mount Kumgang (now in North Korea). No photographs from these assignments have been identified, however.

In 1927, he was given an assignment to cover the Emperor's visit to the Ogasawara islands. Twenty-eight frames from this assignment were featured in the magazine Kaigun (Navy), published by Mitsumura Printing in September 1927. Two of the frames featured were hand-colored. Although the magazine frequently featured hand-colored prints, this is the first known instance in which color was used in Kitazumi's photographs.

In 1932, Kitazumi took a series of portraits depicting the "Noh" actor, Kanze Sakon 24th (二十四世 -観世左近) in his various stage costumes. Each portrait was composed from up to eight frames to create hand-colored plates for a four-color separation process with additional masking templates prepared to apply gold and silver details. This was published in 20 volumes containing 60 portraits over a period of two years as Noh Sugata (能寿賀多).

In 1939, Mitsumura imported a Bermpohl Naturfarbenkamera (tricolor camera) from Germany and Kitazumi was given the task of exploring its use as a part of the color printing process. In the years leading up to Japan's attack on Pearl Harbor, Mitsumura imported two additional tricolor cameras, National Photocolor Lerochrome and Devin Tricolor, from the US. These cameras were used by Mitsumura to develop a photographic printing process which they named the Mitsumura-Bermpohl Process (MBP).

== Kokugakai ==
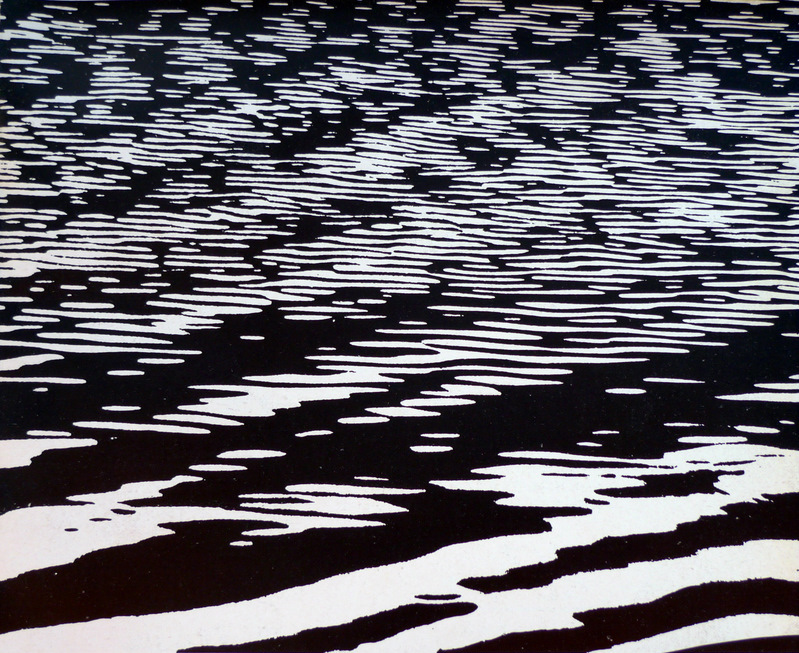
Sazanami ("Wavelets") by Genzō Kitazumi (1940).

In 1940, Kitazumi was awarded the prestigious Kokugakai Arts Association, Photography Award for his submissions "Sazanami", "Kusamura" and "Nagare". (In the same year, Kokugakai Arts Association members' commendations were given to Ihei Kimura and Iwata Nakayama.)

Despite the use of hand-colored photographs and his pioneering work in color for his professional work, Kitazumi's submissions to Kokugakai Arts Association were all monochrome. Furthermore, in contrast to most of his contemporaries, his prints are characteristically devoid of tonal gradation. In his memoirs, he wrote that this was in response to Shinzō Fukuhara's "Hikari to Sono Kaichō" (translated as "Light and its Harmony"), which promoted the beauty of tonal gradations (kaichō) and was a major influence on pre-war Japanese photographers.

== South-East Asia assignment ==
In July 1942, Genzo Kitazumi embarked on an assignment that took him around South East Asia. The aim was to capture in color the scenes from the occupied territories as well as Thailand. With his connections in the Army and Naval Ministries, Toshimo Mitsumura, his employer, ensured that the assignment had the backing of the authorities. For the purpose of the assignment, the team members were designated as employees of Tokyo Nichi Nichi Shinbun attached to the military (gun-zoku). During this assignment he visited French Indochina, Thailand, Malaya, Dutch East Indies and the Philippines.

After returning to Japan in late December 1942, 150 photographs from the assignment were printed in B2 and B4 sizes and exhibited one frame at a time in the shop windows of Tokyo's Ginza district in early 1943. The exhibition subsequently toured the country and was also shown in Karafuto (Sakhalin), Korea, Taiwan and Manchuria.

As the assignment was authorised by and had the backing of the authorities, the photographs from South East Asia are notable for the lack of subject matter with obvious propaganda value. Instead, the focus is on the people and culture of the places that he visited. This is in contrast to the works of other photographers working for the military establishment, such as that of Ihei Kimura in Front magazine.

== Post-war achievements ==
On 25 May 1945, Kitazumi's house, including his photographic archive, was destroyed in the B-29 bombing of Tokyo. The destruction of the archive resulted in the scarcity of photographic record of Kitazumi's work from before 1945.

Immediately after the war, Kitazumi took a leading role in the re-establishment of the Photographic Division of Kokugakai Arts Association. In 1944, the activities of the Photographic Division had been curtailed due to the war effort. By 1945 no exhibition space could be found for the main Kokugakai exhibition due to air raid damage. It was not until 1947 that the Photography Division resumed its annual exhibition. The members of the selection panel were Kitazumi, Ihei Kimura, Iwata Nakayama and Keizō Nagahama.

In 1960, Kitazumi established Sōsaku Inga Kai (創作印画会), an association of artists promoting the process of photograms. In 1969, the association held a group exhibition at Aichi Prefectural Museum of Art.

In his own words, Genzo Kitazumi was "a failed painter who ended up as a deconstructed photographer". Indeed, his yearly submissions to the Arts Association between 1939 and the late seventies could not easily be classified. He rarely published works of straight photography, preferring instead to manipulate the images in the darkroom, and, in his latter years, dispensing with the use of the camera altogether. In the hard outlines of monochromatic images without tonal gradations, it is possible to see a link between his pre-war photographs and post-war photograms.

Kitazumi died in Tokyo on 1982.

== List of known works ==
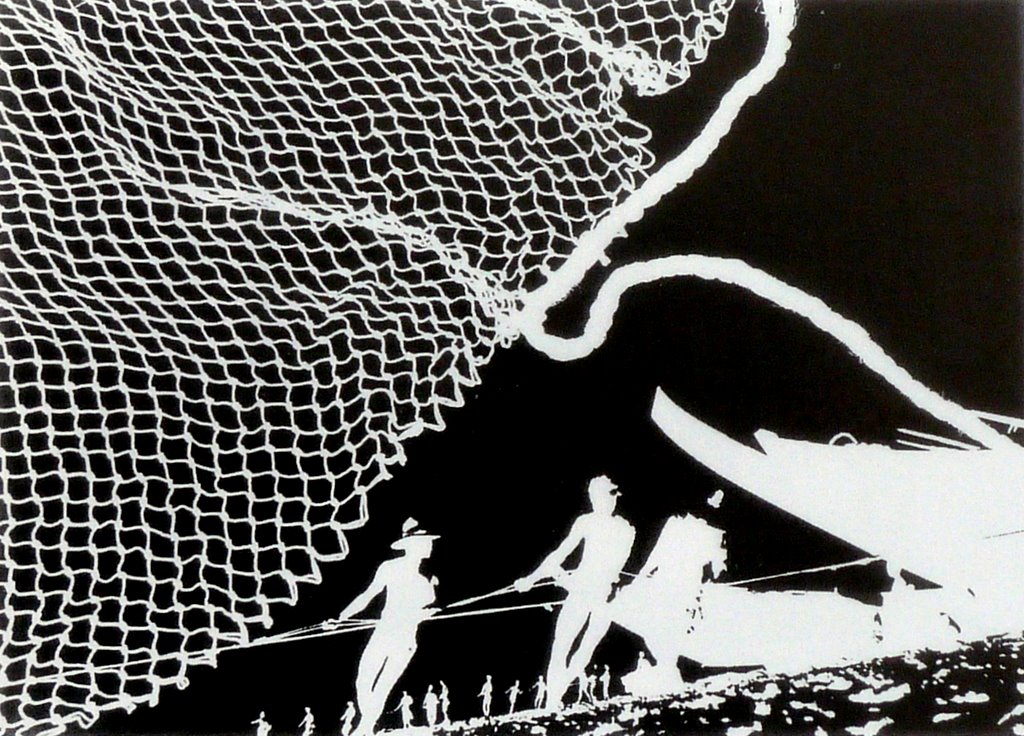
Ami 1 (Fishing Net 1) by Genzō Kitazumi, 1940–45

Year	Title	Format	Location
1940	さざなみ (Wavelets)	Photograph	Unknown
1940–1945	網1 (Fishing Net 1)	Photograph, 40.0 × 54.4 cm	Unknown
1940–1945	網2 (Fishing Net 2)	Photograph, 40.0 × 54.4 cm	Unknown
1965	化石 (Fossil)	Photogram, 44.6 × 37.0 cm	Yokohama Museum of Art
1965	小魚 (Little Fish)	Photogram, 44.6 × 37.0 cm	Yokohama Museum of Art
1965	百舌自身 (Shrike)	Photogram, 44.5 × 37.0 cm	Yokohama Museum of Art
1965	棘 (Thorns)	Photogram, 53.8 × 43.7 cm	Yokohama Museum of Art
1970	きゃべつのうた (Cabbage Song)	Photogram, 28.6 × 23.0 cm	Yokohama Museum of Art
1971	やぶれがさうた (Tattered Umbrella Song)	Photogram, 51.8 × 35.0 cm	Yokohama Museum of Art
1974	鉄仙居士	Photogram, 51.8 × 35.0 cm	Yokohama Museum of Art
n/a	卓上 (Desktop)	Photogram, 44.3 × 35.6 cm	Yokohama Museum of Art
n/a	マルボ詩	Photogram, 44.6 × 37.0 cm	Yokohama Museum of Art
n/a	肖像 (Portrait)	Photogram, 44.6 × 37.9 cm	Yokohama Museum of Art
n/a	舟と少年 (Portrait)	Photogram, 44.6 × 37.9 cm	Tokyo Photographic Art Museum
n/a	花束 (Portrait)	Photogram, 44.6 × 37.9 cm	Private Collection H.ITO
n/a	父子 (Portrait)	Photogram, 44.6 × 37.9 cm	Private Collection H.ITO
