= Center of the Tokyo Raids and War Damage =

- 東京大空襲・戦災資料センター
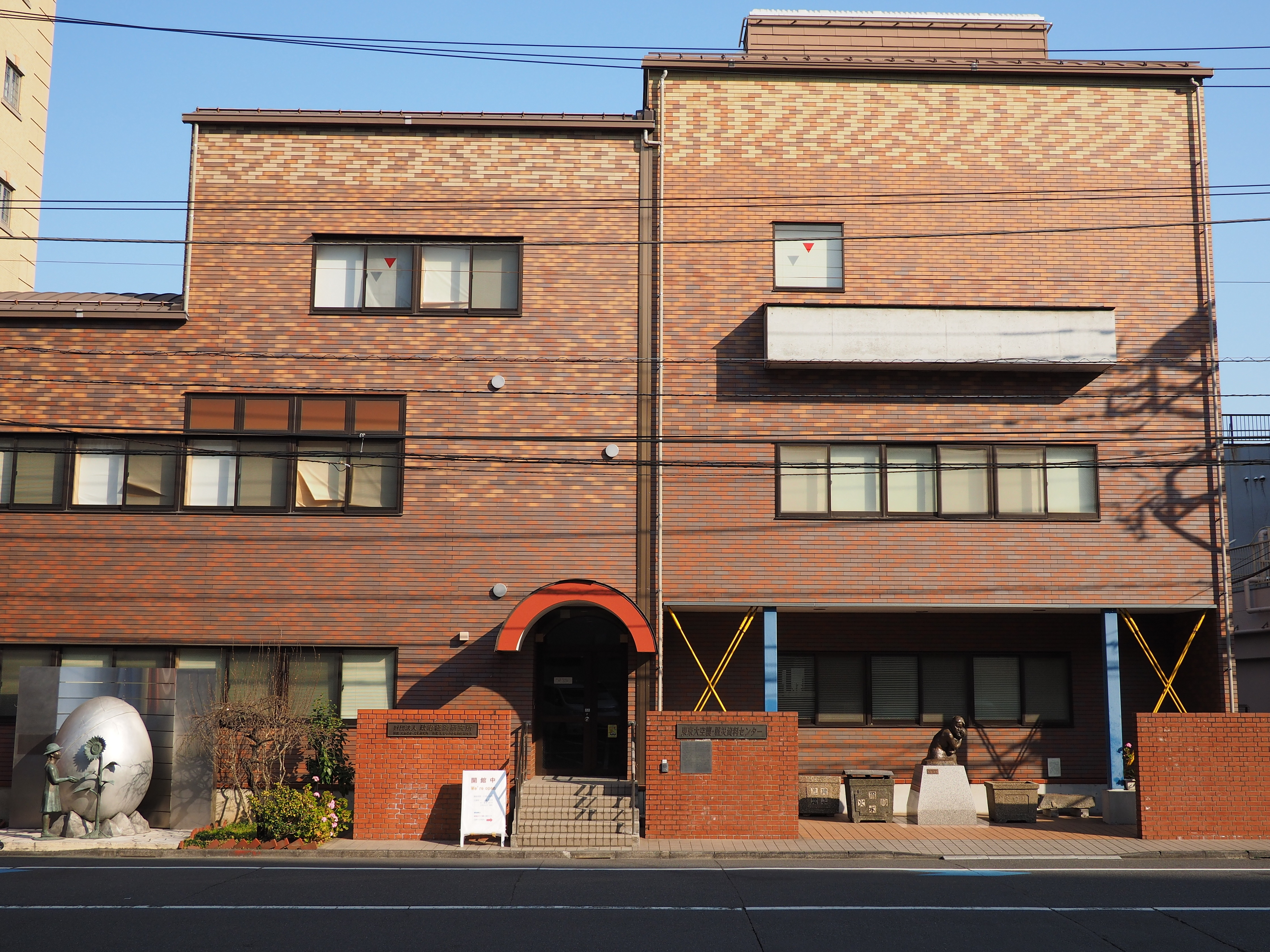
- The exterior of the Center of the Tokyo Raids and War Damage in January 2019

- Location in Tokyo
- Established: 2002
- Location: Kitasuna 1-5-4, Koto, Tokyo, Japan
- Coordinates: 35.6817°N 139.8223°E
- Type: History museum
- Director: Katsumoto Saotome
- Public transit access: Sumiyoshi Station
- Website: tokyo-sensai.net/english_page

The Center of the Tokyo Raids and War Damage (東京大空襲・戦災資料センター, Tōkyō Daikūshū Sensai Shiryō Sentā) is a museum in Tokyo, Japan that presents information and artifacts related to the bombing of Tokyo during World War II. The museum opened in 2002 and was renovated in 2005, the 60th anniversary of the bombings. In 2012, the Center presented an exhibition of 700 previously unseen photos from the bombing. As of 2022, the center received fewer than 10,000 visitors annually.
