= Nitto Maru (1935) =

Japanese fishing boat and a special surveillance boat

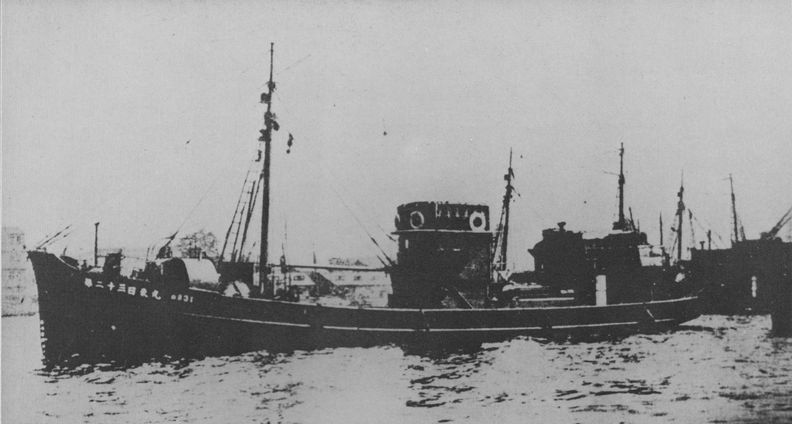
- Nittō Maru

History

Empire of Japan
- Name: No. 23 Nittō Maru (第二十三日東丸)
- Builder: Fuji shipyards
- Launched: 1935
- Commissioned: December 1941
- Out of service: 18 April 1942
- Fate: Sunk 18 April 1942

No. 23 Nittō Maru (Japanese: 第二十三日東丸) was a Japanese fishing vessel that in 1941 was requisitioned and assigned to the Rengo Kantai, the Combined Fleet of the Imperial Japanese Navy, to serve as an early warning coastguard off the coast of Japan during the Second World War.

== History ==
The Nittō Maru was built as a fishing vessel by Fuji shipyards and launched in 1935, had an iron hull, a gross register tonnage of 90 tons and a length of 30 metres (98 ft 5 in). In its capacity as an early warning ship it was armed with a 13.2-millimetre (0.52 in) anti-aircraft machine gun, equipped with a powerful radio transmitter and had eight crew members.

In December 1941, Nittō Maru was requisitioned and assigned to the No. 7 Patrol Division of the 5th Fleet as picket boat No. 23 Nittō Maru, based in Ominato. These coastal patrols with a total of 116 smaller vessels were established by Admiral Isoroku Yamamoto as a defensive surveillance system since Japan did not have radar as a means of early warning in case the enemy approached the national coasts. No. 23 Nittō Maru reported to a base ship, the light cruiser Kiso.

== Sinking ==
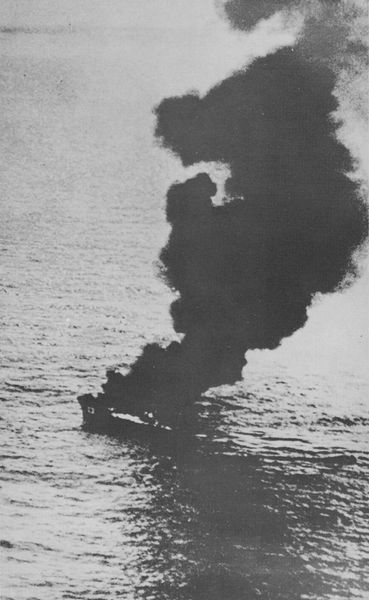
Nittō Maru sinking by USS Nashville

On 18 April 1942, Nitto Maru was on patrol 668 nautical miles (1,237 km; 769 mi) from the Japanese coast, a few miles from the Nagato Maru, another ship with similar characteristics. A little further and off the horizon sailed the Awata Maru, an armed merchant cruiser.

At about 07:38, lookouts aboard Nittō Maru detected an enemy force heading at speed towards Japan and transmitted a warning message to Kiso. The Nittō Maru had detected the US task force conducting the Doolittle Raid at about 650 nautical miles (1,200 km; 750 mi) from Japan (around 35°N 154°E). The Nittō Maru was likewise spotted by the Americans. Realizing that they had been detected, American Vice Admiral William Halsey Jr. ordered aircraft from the aircraft carrier USS Enterprise to take off, immediately attack and destroy the Japanese ships surrounding the naval force and en route to Japan. He also ordered the light cruiser USS Nashville to gun down and sink the Nittō Maru. The cruiser had to use more than 900 shells to sink Nittō Maru mainly due to rough sea conditions. The vessel was finally sunk at about 08:23.

Halsey and Lieutenant Colonel James H. Doolittle made the decision to launch the 16 B-25 bombers 150 miles (240 km) ahead of schedule. At the same time, Admiral Yamamoto received the message broadcast by the Nittō Maru and ordered the immediate departure of the forces of the Admiral Kondō Nobutake in command of the 2nd Mobile Fleet to intercept the US force.

The Nittō Maru received a fatal impact at approximately 8:20 a.m. The Enterprise's aircraft damaged eight nearby vessels, sinking the smaller surveillance vessels Nagato Maru and Iwata Maru before returning to the carrier. As a result of launching early due to the detection of the Nittō Maru, the bombers of the Doolittle Raid were affected by the lack of fuel when they reached the coast of South China. Following the launch of the bombers, the US Navy task force left Japanese waters at maximum speed which made it impossible for Admiral Kondo's forces to catch them.
