= Tatsuyuki Tomiyama =

Japanese footballer

Personal information
- Full name: Tatsuyuki Tomiyama
- Date of birth: August 27, 1982 (age 44)
- Place of birth: Chiba, Japan
- Height: 1.74 m (5 ft 8 1/2 in)
- Position: Defender

Youth career
- 2001–2004: Ryutsu Keizai University

Senior career*
Years	Team	Apps	(Gls)
2005–2007	Shonan Bellmare	45	(0)
2008–2011	Gainare Tottori	76	(3)
Total		121	(3)
- * Club domestic league appearances and goals

Tatsuyuki Tomiyama (冨山 達行, Tomiyama Tatsuyuki; born August 27, 1982) is a former Japanese football player.

Tomiyama previously played for Shonan Bellmare in the J2 League.

== Career statistics ==
Appearances and goals by club, season and competition
Club	Season	League			Emperor's Cup		Total	
Club	Season	Division	Apps	Goals	Apps	Goals	Apps	Goals
Shonan Bellmare	2005	J2 League	19	0	1	0	20	0
Shonan Bellmare	2006	J2 League	23	0	0	0	23	0
Shonan Bellmare	2007	J2 League	3	0	0	0	3	0
Gainare Tottori	2008	Football League	28	2	1	0	29	2
Gainare Tottori	2009	Football League	22	1	1	1	23	2
Gainare Tottori	2010	Football League						
Career total			95	3	3	1	98	4
