= List of justices of the Supreme Court of Japan =

The Supreme Court of Japan is the highest court in Japan, composed of fifteen justices. The Chief Justice is nominated by the Cabinet and appointed to office by the Emperor, while associate justices are appointed by the Cabinet in attestation of the Emperor. The Judiciary Act fixes the total number of justices at 15, but allows the court itself to specify how many justices sit on a petty bench. By law, at least ten out of the fifteen justices must have either ten years of combined experience as judges, or twenty years of combined experience as judges, lawyers, or professors.

Japan's bar associations are careful to select lawyers whose terms will be shorter than those of nominated former judges. (Potential justices are often 64 years old or above.) This causes quick turnover of justices, which has resulted in a perception of the court as a "nameless, faceless judiciary."

After appointment, Supreme Court justices are subject to a "people's review": an automatic retention referendum in which the voters may remove the judge from office. A people's review occurs at the first election to the House of Representatives after a justice assumes office, when the question of whether his tenure should continue is put to voters on the ballot. The Supreme Court justice is then subject to a further people's review at the first lower house election after every ten years. As of April 2019, no Supreme Court justice has ever been dismissed by a people's review.

== Justices ==
This is a list of all 196 current and former justices of the modern Supreme Court of Japan.

Title	Name	Term start	Term end	Term length	University	Notes
Justice	Hiroshi Yamamoto	October 27, 2026		13 days	Hitotsubashi	Former Deputy Prosecutor-General, Supreme Public Prosecutors Office
Justice	Hirofumi Ata	February 2, 2026		280 days	Doshisha	Former attorney; former chairman of the Japan Federation of Bar Associations' Judicial System Research Committee
Justice	Masami Okino	July 24, 2025		1 year, 108 days	Tokyo	Dean, Graduate Schools for Law and Politics and Faculty of Law, University of Tokyo
Justice	Junichi Takasu	March 27, 2025		1 year, 227 days	Hosei	Dean, Graduate School of Law, Hosei University
Chief Justice	Yukihiko Imasaki	August 16, 2024		2 years, 85 days	Kyoto	Associate Justice, Supreme Court
Justice	Makoto Nakamura	September 11, 2024		2 years, 59 days	Kyoto	President, Tokyo High Court
Justice	Masahiro Hiraki	August 16, 2024		2 years, 85 days	Tokyo	President, Osaka High Court
Justice	Kimihiro Ishikane	April 17, 2024		2 years, 206 days	Tokyo	Diplomat, Ambassador to the United Nations
Justice	Mitsuko Miyagawa	November 6, 2023		3 years, 3 days	Tokyo	Former attorney; member, Dai-ichi Tokyo Bar Association
Justice	Akira Ojima	July 5, 2022		4 years, 127 days	Tokyo	President, Osaka High Court
Justice	Katsuya Uga	March 20, 2019	July 20, 2025	6 years, 122 days	Tokyo	Professor of Law
Justice	Michiharu Hayashi	September 2, 2019		7 years, 68 days	Tokyo	President, Tokyo High Court
Justice	Kazumi Okamura	October 2, 2019		7 years, 38 days	Waseda	Public Prosecutor, Supreme Public Prosecutors Office
Justice	Yasumasa Nagamine	February 8, 2021	April 15, 2024	3 years, 67 days	Tokyo	Ambassador of Japan to the United Kingdom
Justice	Eriko Watanabe	July 16, 2021		5 years, 116 days	Tohoku	Bar Examiner of the National Bar Examination Commission
Justice	Masaki Oka	September 3, 2021	February 1, 2026	5 years, 67 days	Tokyo	Outside Director, Sumitomo Mitsui Banking Corporation
Justice	Ryōsuke Yasunami	July 16, 2021		5 years, 116 days	Tokyo	President, Osaka High Court
Justice	Toru Sakai	September 3, 2021		5 years, 67 days	Tokyo	Superintending Prosecutor, Tokyo High Public Prosecutors Office
Justice	Atsushi Yamaguchi	February 6, 2017	November 5, 2023	6 years, 272 days	Tokyo	Former attorney; member, Dai-ichi Tokyo Bar Association
Justice	Kiyoko Okabe	April 12, 2010	March 19, 2019	8 years, 341 days	Keio	Former judge; professor, Keio University School of Law
Justice	Tsuneyuki Yamamoto	August 20, 2013	September 25, 2019	6 years, 36 days	Kyoto	Civil servant. Director-General, the Cabinet Legislation Bureau
Justice	Toshimitsu Yamasaki	April 1, 2014	August 30, 2019	5 years, 151 days	Tokyo	Former assistant judge; President, Tokyo High Court.
Justice	Masayuki Ikegami	October 2, 2014	August 28, 2021	12 years, 38 days	Tohoku	Former prosecutor, Osaka High Public Prosecutors Office.
Justice	Hiroshi Koike	April 2, 2015	July 2, 2021	11 years, 221 days	Tokyo	Former assistant judge; President, Tokyo High Court
Justice	Katsuyuki Kizawa	July 19, 2016	August 26, 2021	10 years, 113 days	Rikkyo	Former attorney; Inspector of Kake Educational Institution
Justice	Hiroyuki Kanno	September 5, 2016	July 2, 2021	10 years, 65 days	Tohoku	Former judge; President, Osaka High Court
Chief Justice	Saburo Tokura	March 14, 2017	August 10, 2024	7 years, 149 days	Hitotsubashi	Judge; President, Tokyo High Court
Justice	Keiichi Hayashi	April 10, 2017	February 7, 2021	9 years, 213 days	Kyoto	Diplomat, Ambassador to the United Kingdom
Justice	Yuko Miyazaki	January 9, 2018	July 8, 2021	8 years, 304 days	Tokyo	Professor, University of Tokyo
Justice	Takuya Miyama	January 9, 2018	September 1, 2024	6 years, 236 days	Tokyo	Judge; President, Tokyo High Court
Justice	Mamoru Miura	February 26, 2018	October 22, 2026	8 years, 238 days	Tokyo	Prosecutor, Osaka High Public Prosecutors Office
Justice	Koichi Kusano	February 13, 2019	March 21, 2025	6 years, 36 days	Keio	
Justice	Takehiko Otani	June 17, 2010	March 9, 2017	6 years, 265 days	Tokyo	Former judge. President, Osaka High Court.
Justice	Masaharu Ōhashi	February 13, 2012	March 30, 2017	5 years, 45 days	Tokyo	Attorney; official in the Japanese Federation of Bar Associations (JFBA)
Justice	Yoshinobu Onuki	April 11, 2012	January 16, 2018	5 years, 280 days	Chuo	Prosecutor; professor, Asia University
Justice	Kaoru Onimaru	February 6, 2013	February 6, 2019	6 years, 0 days	Tokyo	Attorney; Chairperson of the Special Committee on the Rights of the Aged and Disabled
Justice	Michiyoshi Kiuchi	April 25, 2013	January 1, 2018	4 years, 251 days	Tokyo	Attorney; Chairperson of the Project Team on the Hague Convention
Justice	Katsumi Chiba	December 28, 2009	August 24, 2016	6 years, 240 days	Tokyo	Judge; President, Sendai High Court
Justice	Koji Miyakawa	September 3, 2008	February 27, 2012	3 years, 177 days	Nagoya	Instructor at the Legal Training and Research Institute; attorney
Justice	Tokuji Izumi	November 6, 2002	January 24, 2009	6 years, 79 days	Kyoto	Judge; President, Tokyo High Court
Chief Justice	Niro Shimada	November 7, 2002	November 21, 2008	6 years, 14 days	Tokyo	Judge; President, Osaka High Court
Justice	Kazuko Yokoo	December 19, 2001	September 11, 2008	6 years, 267 days	ICU	Diplomat; Ambassador of Japan to Ireland
Justice	Chiharu Saiguchi	January 6, 2004	September 2, 2008	4 years, 240 days	Chūō	Attorney; Member, Advisory Committee on Civil Rules of the Supreme Court
Justice	Osamu Tsuno	February 26, 2004	October 19, 2008	4 years, 236 days	Kyoto	Bureaucrat; attorney; Director-General, Cabinet Legislation Bureau
Justice	Shigeo Takii	June 11, 2002	October 30, 2006	4 years, 141 days	Kyoto	Attorney
Justice	Kohei Nasu	May 25, 2006	February 10, 2012	5 years, 261 days	Tokyo	Attorney; Chairperson of the Sub-Committee on Research of Japan Law Foundation
Justice	Yoshiki Yamaura	March 1, 2012	July 3, 2016	4 years, 124 days	Hitotsubashi	
Chief Justice	Itsuro Terada	December 27, 2012	January 8, 2018	5 years, 12 days	Tokyo	Judge; son of 10th Chief Justice Jiro Terada.
Justice	Yuu Shiraki	January 15, 2010	February 14, 2015	5 years, 30 days		
Justice	Tomoyuki Yokota	January 6, 2010	October 1, 2014	4 years, 268 days	Chuo	
Justice	Masahiko Sudo	December 28, 2009	December 26, 2012	2 years, 364 days	Chuo	
Justice	Seishi Kanetsuki	January 26, 2009	March 31, 2015	6 years, 64 days	Tokyo	Judge; former President, Osaka High Court.
Chief Justice	Hironobu Takesaki	November 25, 2008	March 31, 2014	5 years, 126 days		
Justice	Yukio Takeuchi	October 21, 2008	July 19, 2013	4 years, 271 days	Kyoto	
Justice	Ryuko Sakurai	September 11, 2008	January 15, 2017	8 years, 126 days	Kyushu	
Justice	Takaharu Kondo	May 23, 2007	November 21, 2010	3 years, 182 days		
Justice	Mutsuo Tahara	November 1, 2006	April 22, 2013	6 years, 172 days	Kyoto	
Justice	Norio Wakui	October 16, 2006	December 17, 2009	3 years, 62 days	Kyoto	
Justice	Yuki Furuta	August 2, 2005	April 7, 2012	6 years, 249 days		
Justice	Yukio Horigome	May 17, 2005	June 15, 2010	5 years, 29 days		
Justice	Ryoji Nakagawa	January 19, 2005	December 22, 2009	4 years, 337 days	Kanazawa	
Justice	Isao Imai	December 27, 2004	December 25, 2009	4 years, 363 days	Kyoto	
Justice	Tatsuo Kainaka	October 7, 2002	January 1, 2010	7 years, 86 days	Chuo	
Justice	Tokiyasu Fujita	September 30, 2002	April 5, 2010	7 years, 187 days		
Justice	Toyozo Ueda	February 21, 2002	May 22, 2007	5 years, 90 days		
Justice	Kunio Hamada	May 1, 2001	May 23, 2006	5 years, 22 days		
Justice	Takehisa Fukuzawa	September 14, 2000	January 4, 2004	3 years, 112 days		
Chief Justice	Akira Machida	March 22, 2000	October 15, 2006	6 years, 207 days		
Justice	Gen Kajitani	April 21, 1999	January 14, 2005	5 years, 268 days		
Justice	Masamichi Okuda	April 1, 1999	September 27, 2002	3 years, 179 days		
Justice	Tsugio Kameyama	December 4, 1998	February 25, 2004	5 years, 83 days		
Justice	Hiroharu Kitagawa	September 10, 1998	December 26, 2004	6 years, 107 days		
Justice	Toshihiro Kanatani	October 31, 1997	May 16, 2005	7 years, 197 days		
Justice	Takao Ode	September 24, 1997	December 19, 2001	4 years, 86 days		
Justice	Toshifumi Motohara	September 8, 1997	April 21, 2001	3 years, 225 days		
Chief Justice	Shigeru Yamaguchi	March 10, 1997	November 3, 2002	5 years, 238 days		
Justice	Masao Fujii	November 7, 1995	November 6, 2002	6 years, 364 days		
Justice	Hiroshi Fukuda	September 4, 1995	August 1, 2005	9 years, 331 days		
Justice	Kazutomo Ijima	August 11, 1995	October 6, 2002	7 years, 56 days		
Justice	Mitsuo Endo	February 13, 1995	September 12, 2000	5 years, 212 days		
Justice	Shinichi Kawai	July 25, 1994	June 10, 2002	7 years, 320 days		
Justice	Yukinobu Ozaki	February 16, 1994	April 18, 1999	5 years, 61 days		
Justice	Hisako Takahashi	February 9, 1994	September 20, 1997	3 years, 223 days		
Justice	Shigeharu Negishi	January 11, 1994	December 3, 1998	4 years, 326 days		
Justice	Hideo Chikusa	September 13, 1993	February 20, 2002	8 years, 160 days		
Justice	Masaru Oshiro	April 13, 1993	February 13, 1995	1 year, 306 days		
Justice	Masao Ono	April 1, 1993	September 2, 1997	4 years, 154 days		
Chief Justice	Toru Miyoshi	March 25, 1992	October 30, 1997	5 years, 219 days		
Justice	Motoo Ono	February 13, 1992	March 15, 2000	8 years, 31 days		
Justice	Katsuya Onishi	May 13, 1991	September 9, 1998	7 years, 119 days		
Justice	Osamu Mimura	December 10, 1990	February 6, 1994	3 years, 58 days		
Justice	Ryohei Kizaki	September 3, 1990	July 24, 1994	3 years, 324 days		
Justice	Tsuneo Kabe	May 10, 1990	March 8, 1997	6 years, 302 days		
Justice	Shoichiro Sato	February 20, 1990	February 15, 1994	3 years, 360 days		
Justice	Toshijiro Nakajima	January 24, 1990	September 1, 1995	5 years, 220 days		
Justice	Shirohei Hashimoto	January 11, 1990	April 12, 1993	3 years, 91 days		
Chief Justice	Ryohachi Kusaba	November 27, 1989	November 7, 1995	5 years, 345 days		
Justice	Itsuo Sonobe	September 21, 1989	March 31, 1999	9 years, 191 days		
Justice	Seiichi Ohori	June 17, 1988	August 10, 1995	7 years, 54 days		
Justice	Katsumi Teika	March 17, 1988	September 12, 1993	5 years, 179 days		
Justice	Hisayuki Okuno	September 5, 1987	August 26, 1990	2 years, 355 days		
Justice	Iwao Yotsuya	January 28, 1987	February 8, 1992	5 years, 11 days		
Justice	Tonosuke Hayashi	June 13, 1986	August 6, 1987	1 year, 54 days		
Justice	Tetsuro Sato	May 21, 1986	January 4, 1990	3 years, 228 days		
Justice	Toshio Sakaue	January 17, 1986	March 31, 1993	7 years, 73 days		
Justice	Yasukazu Kagawa	January 17, 1986	May 4, 1991	5 years, 107 days		
Justice	Tsuneo Ouchi	November 5, 1985	March 23, 1992	6 years, 139 days		
Justice	Akira Fujishima	May 23, 1985	January 1, 1994	8 years, 223 days		
Justice	Masuo Takashima	December 17, 1984	May 2, 1988	3 years, 137 days		
Justice	Atsushi Nagashima	June 12, 1984	March 16, 1988	3 years, 278 days		
Justice	Rokuro Shimatani	May 8, 1984	January 23, 1990	5 years, 260 days		
Chief Justice	Koichi Yaguchi	February 20, 1984	February 19, 1990	5 years, 364 days		
Justice	Reijiro Tsunoda	November 8, 1983	December 3, 1990	7 years, 25 days		
Justice	Mitsuhiko Yasuoka	October 1, 1982	May 4, 1990	7 years, 215 days		
Justice	Seiichi Wada	August 16, 1982	April 23, 1986	3 years, 250 days		
Justice	Keiji Maki	May 28, 1982	November 24, 1989	7 years, 180 days		
Justice	Hisaharu Kidoguchi	April 12, 1982	January 8, 1986	3 years, 271 days		
Justice	Susumu Ohashi	November 2, 1981	June 12, 1986	4 years, 222 days		
Justice	Masataka Taniguchi	April 16, 1980	January 27, 1987	6 years, 286 days		
Chief Justice	Jiro Terada	March 22, 1980	November 3, 1985	5 years, 226 days		Father of 18th Chief Justice Itsuro Terada.
Justice	Goichi Miyazaki	February 6, 1980	May 4, 1984	4 years, 88 days		
Justice	Masami Ito	January 19, 1980	September 20, 1989	9 years, 244 days		
Justice	Yasuyoshi Shiono	April 2, 1979	May 22, 1985	6 years, 50 days		
Justice	Shigeyori Tsukamoto	April 2, 1979	October 17, 1981	2 years, 198 days		
Justice	Tadayoshi Kinoshita	March 1, 1979	January 14, 1986	6 years, 319 days		
Justice	Daizo Yokoi	September 22, 1978	June 10, 1984	5 years, 262 days		
Justice	Jiro Nakamura	September 22, 1978	February 19, 1984	5 years, 150 days		
Justice	Hiromu Toda	July 14, 1978	March 25, 1980	1 year, 255 days		
Justice	Toru Motoyama	August 26, 1977	August 10, 1982	4 years, 349 days		
Justice	Masato Fujisaki	April 5, 1977	December 15, 1984	7 years, 254 days		
Justice	Kazuo Kurimoto	May 25, 1976	May 26, 1982	6 years, 1 day		
Justice	Shoichi Tamaki	March 27, 1976	April 11, 1982	6 years, 15 days		
Chief Justice	Takaaki Hattori	December 3, 1975	September 30, 1982	6 years, 301 days		
Justice	Yuzuru Motobayashi	August 8, 1975	March 30, 1979	3 years, 234 days		
Justice	Shigemitsu Dando	October 4, 1974	November 7, 1983	9 years, 34 days		
Justice	Yutaka Yoshida	May 21, 1973	February 28, 1979	5 years, 283 days		
Justice	Masami Takatsuji	April 4, 1973	January 18, 1980	6 years, 289 days		
Justice	Kiichiro Otsuka	February 2, 1973	February 4, 1980	7 years, 2 days		
Justice	Kiyoo Erikuchi	January 9, 1973	March 19, 1980	7 years, 70 days		
Justice	Yasuo Kishigami	November 28, 1972	September 21, 1978	5 years, 297 days		
Justice	Yoshikatsu Sakamoto	December 7, 1971	March 26, 1976	4 years, 110 days		
Justice	Buichi Amano	May 21, 1971	September 20, 1978	7 years, 122 days		
Justice	Seiichi Kishi	April 2, 1971	July 13, 1978	7 years, 102 days		
Justice	Takeso Shimoda	January 12, 1971	April 2, 1977	6 years, 80 days		
Justice	Nobuo Ogawa	December 22, 1970	August 6, 1975	4 years, 227 days		
Chief Justice	Masao Okahara	October 28, 1970	March 31, 1979	8 years, 154 days		
Chief Justice	Ekizo Fujibayashi	July 31, 1970	August 25, 1977	7 years, 25 days		
Justice	Kosato Sekine	January 17, 1969	December 2, 1975	6 years, 319 days		
Chief Justice	Tomokazu Murakami	November 19, 1968	May 24, 1976	7 years, 187 days		
Justice	Yoshimi Iimura	September 20, 1967	April 26, 1971	3 years, 218 days		
Justice	Masao Matsumoto	January 17, 1967	December 5, 1971	4 years, 322 days		
Justice	Kenichiro Osumi	September 9, 1966	October 1, 1974	8 years, 22 days		
Justice	Kotaro Irokawa	May 10, 1966	January 29, 1973	6 years, 264 days		
Justice	Kazuo Shimomura	September 14, 1965	January 1, 1973	7 years, 109 days		
Justice	Makoto Iwata	August 31, 1964	November 25, 1972	8 years, 86 days		
Justice	Jiro Matsuda	January 31, 1964	July 29, 1970	6 years, 179 days		
Justice	Jiro Tanaka	January 16, 1964	March 31, 1973	9 years, 74 days		
Justice	Goroku Kashihara	December 13, 1963	September 19, 1967	3 years, 280 days		
Justice	Yoshihiko Kido	June 6, 1963	December 19, 1970	7 years, 196 days		
Chief Justice	Kazuto Ishida	June 6, 1963	May 19, 1973	9 years, 347 days		
Justice	Kingo Osabe	April 5, 1963	March 31, 1971	7 years, 360 days		
Justice	Asanosuke Kusaka	August 12, 1962	October 24, 1970	8 years, 73 days		
Justice	Kitaro Saito	May 29, 1962	August 9, 1964	2 years, 72 days		
Chief Justice	Masatoshi Yokota	February 28, 1962	January 10, 1969	6 years, 317 days		
Justice	Kakiwa Gokijo	August 26, 1961	December 31, 1966	5 years, 127 days		
Justice	Sakunosuke Yamada	December 27, 1960	April 21, 1966	5 years, 115 days		
Chief Justice	Kisaburo Yokota	October 25, 1960	August 5, 1966	5 years, 284 days		
Justice	Shuichi Ishisaka	June 28, 1958	September 13, 1965	7 years, 77 days		
Justice	Tsuneshichi Takagi	June 28, 1958	March 14, 1963	4 years, 259 days		
Justice	Kiyoshi Takahashi	January 30, 1957	December 29, 1961	4 years, 333 days		
Justice	Kenichi Okuno	November 22, 1956	November 17, 1968	11 years, 361 days		
Justice	Masuo Shimoiizaka	November 22, 1956	January 28, 1964	7 years, 67 days		
Justice	Daisuke Kawamura	November 22, 1956	June 1, 1963	6 years, 191 days		
Justice	Katsumi Tarumi	May 26, 1955	November 14, 1963	8 years, 172 days		
Justice	Katsu Ikeda	November 2, 1954	May 22, 1963	8 years, 201 days		
Justice	Toshio Irie	August 30, 1952	January 9, 1971	18 years, 132 days		
Justice	Zentaro Motomura	January 21, 1952	January 14, 1957	4 years, 359 days		
Justice	Shunzo Kobayashi	October 5, 1951	June 2, 1958	6 years, 240 days		
Justice	Tadaichiro Tanimura	April 12, 1951	November 10, 1956	5 years, 212 days		
Chief Justice	Kotaro Tanaka	March 3, 1950	October 24, 1960	10 years, 235 days		
Justice	Shigeto Hozumi	February 26, 1949	July 29, 1951	2 years, 153 days		
Justice	Matasuke Kawamura	August 4, 1947	December 31, 1963	16 years, 149 days		
Justice	Saburo Iwamatsu	August 4, 1947	November 10, 1956	9 years, 98 days		
Justice	Hachiro Fujita	August 4, 1947	August 4, 1962	15 years, 0 days		
Justice	Yusuke Saito	August 4, 1947	May 20, 1962	14 years, 289 days		
Justice	Tamotsu Shima	August 4, 1947	August 24, 1961	14 years, 20 days		
Justice	Katsushige Kotani	August 4, 1947	December 23, 1960	13 years, 141 days		
Justice	Riichi Shono	August 4, 1947	June 28, 1948	329 days		
Justice	Tsuyoshi Mano	August 4, 1947	June 8, 1958	10 years, 308 days		
Justice	Shigeru Kuriyama	August 4, 1947	October 5, 1956	9 years, 62 days		
Justice	Nobori Inoue	August 4, 1947	April 9, 1955	7 years, 248 days		
Justice	Seiichi Shimoyama	August 4, 1947	October 14, 1954	7 years, 71 days		
Justice	Takejiro Sawada	August 4, 1947	August 1, 1952	4 years, 363 days		
Justice	Taichiro Hasegawa	August 4, 1947	November 30, 1951	4 years, 118 days		
Justice	Naoyoshi Tsukasaki	August 4, 1947	February 14, 1951	3 years, 194 days		
Chief Justice	Tadahiko Mibuchi	August 4, 1947	March 2, 1950	2 years, 210 days	Kyoto	
