= Imperial Household Council =

Government agency

The Imperial Household Council (皇室会議, Kōshitsu Kaigi) is a ten-member body to approve the statutory matters on the Imperial House of Japan. The Council was established in 1947, when the current Imperial Household Law took effect.

== Functions ==
The Imperial Household Law provides that the Council shall be summoned by the prime minister to approve of:

- Marriage of any male member of the Imperial Family (Article X)
- Forfeiture of the Imperial status of a member of the Imperial Family (Articles XI, XIII and XIV)
- Changing of the order of succession of an heir who suffers from incurable disease (Article III)
- Regency (Articles XVI, XVIII and XX)

The Imperial Household Council has been convoked eight times hitherto. At each time, the Council meeting was headed by the Prime Minister and gave a unanimous consent and approval to the agenda.

=== Forfeiture of the Imperial status ===
Fifty-one members lost their Imperial status in 1947 with an approval of the Council.

=== Approval of marriage ===
The Council has discussed and approved of six marriages since its establishment.

Date of approval	Marriage between
27 November 1958	Prince Akihito and Michiko Shōda
28 February 1964	Prince Masahito and Hanako Tsugaru
18 April 1980	Prince Tomohito and Nobuko Asō
1 August 1984	Prince Norihito and Hisako Tottori
12 September 1989	Prince Fumihito and Kiko Kawashima
19 January 1993	Prince Naruhito and Masako Owada

No princess of the blood needs a marriage approval unless she marries a member of the Imperial House, because she will automatically become a commoner upon marriage and her husband will never be a member of the Imperial House under the rule of patrilineal succession. Seven princesses have married without the Council's approval since it was established.

=== Imperial abdication ===
In the summer of 2016, the aged Emperor Akihito indicated his desire to retire, leading to special legislation permitting the first abdication in over two centuries. The council met in December 2017 to formalize how and when the event would take place.

== Members of the Imperial Household Council ==
Article XXVIII of the Imperial Household Law provides that the Imperial Household Council shall consist of:

- Two members of the imperial family
- Prime minister
- The speaker and vice-speaker of the House of Representatives
- The president and vice-president of the House of Councillors
- Grand steward of the Imperial Household Agency
- Chief justice and one other justice of the Supreme Court

Article XXX of the Imperial Household Law provides that other ten members shall be appointed as reserve members of the Council:

- Minister of state - in most cases, chief cabinet secretary
- Two members of the Imperial Family
- Two members of the House of Representatives
- Two members of the House of Councillors
- An official of the Imperial Household Agency - in most cases, Vice-Grand Steward
- Two justices of the Supreme Court

=== Incumbent members of the Council ===
The regular members as of 23 March 2026:

- Fumihito, Crown Prince Akishino
- Hanako, Princess Hitachi
- Eisuke Mori, Speaker of the House of Representatives
- Keiichi Ishii, Vice Speaker of the House of Representatives
- Masakazu Sekiguchi, President of the House of Councillors
- Tetsuro Fukuyama, Vice President of the House of Councillors
- Sanae Takaichi, Prime Minister
- Buichirō Kuroda, Grand Steward
- Yukihiko Imasaki, Chief Justice of the Supreme Court
- Mamoru Miura, Justice of the Supreme Court

The reserve members are as follows:

- Kiko, Princess Akishino
- Hisako, Princess Takamado
- Fukushiro Nukaga, member of the House of Representatives
- Yoshihiko Noda, member of the House of Representatives
- Masaji Matsuyama, member of the House of Councillors
- Masayo Tanabu, member of the House of Councillors
- Minoru Kihara, Chief Cabinet Secretary
- Yoshimi Ogata, Vice Grand Steward
- Kazumi Okamura, Justice of the Supreme Court
- Michiharu Hayashi, Justice of the Supreme Court

=== Kōzoku Giin (Imperial Representative) ===
Kōzoku Giin (皇族議員), literally Imperial Representative, refers to the Imperial Family members elected as members of the Imperial Household Council by mutual election among the adult members of the Imperial Family excluding the emperor. They vote to elect two reserve members from the imperial family in the same way.

Term of office starts on	Members		Reserve members	
16 September 1947	Nobuhito, Prince Takamatsu	Setsuko, Princess Chichibu	Takahito, Prince Mikasa	Kikuko, Princess Takamatsu
16 September 1951	Nobuhito, Prince Takamatsu	Takahito, Prince Mikasa	Setsuko, Princess Chichibu	Atsuko, Princess Yori (until 10 October 1952)
(12 October 1952)	Nobuhito, Prince Takamatsu	Takahito, Prince Mikasa	Setsuko, Princess Chichibu	Kikuko, Princess Takamatsu
16 September 1955	Setsuko, Princess Chichibu	Nobuhito, Prince Takamatsu	Kikuko, Princess Takamatsu	Takahito, Prince Mikasa
16 September 1959	Nobuhito, Prince Takamatsu (died on 3 February 1987)	Setsuko, Princess Chichibu	Takahito, Prince Mikasa	Kikuko, Princess Takamatsu
16 September 1963	Nobuhito, Prince Takamatsu (died on 3 February 1987)	Takahito, Prince Mikasa	Yuriko, Princess Mikasa	Akihito, Crown Prince
16 September 1967	Nobuhito, Prince Takamatsu (died on 3 February 1987)	Takahito, Prince Mikasa	Setsuko, Princess Chichibu	Akihito, Crown Prince
16 September 1971	Nobuhito, Prince Takamatsu (died on 3 February 1987)	Takahito, Prince Mikasa	Setsuko, Princess Chichibu	Akihito, Crown Prince
16 September 1975	Nobuhito, Prince Takamatsu (died on 3 February 1987)	Takahito, Prince Mikasa	Setsuko, Princess Chichibu	Akihito, Crown Prince
16 September 1979	Nobuhito, Prince Takamatsu (died on 3 February 1987)	Takahito, Prince Mikasa	Setsuko, Princess Chichibu	Akihito, Crown Prince
16 September 1983	Nobuhito, Prince Takamatsu (died on 3 February 1987)	Takahito, Prince Mikasa	Setsuko, Princess Chichibu	Akihito, Crown Prince
16 September 1987	Takahito, Prince Mikasa	Akihito, Crown Prince (enthroned on 7 January 1989)	Masahito, Prince Hitachi	Setsuko, Princess Chichibu
(5 September 1989)	Takahito, Prince Mikasa	Masahito, Prince Hitachi	(vacant)	Setsuko, Princess Chichibu
16 September 1991	Takahito, Prince Mikasa	Yuriko, Princess Mikasa	Masahito, Prince Hitachi	Naruhito, Crown Prince
16 September 1995	Takahito, Prince Mikasa	Yuriko, Princess Mikasa	Masahito, Prince Hitachi	Naruhito, Crown Prince
16 September 1999	Takahito, Prince Mikasa	Yuriko, Princess Mikasa	Naruhito, Crown Prince	Masahito, Prince Hitachi
16 September 2003	Takahito, Prince Mikasa	Yuriko, Princess Mikasa	Masahito, Prince Hitachi	Hanako, Princess Hitachi
16 September 2007	Masahito, Prince Hitachi	Hanako, Princess Hitachi	Yuriko, Princess Mikasa	Fumihito, Prince Akishino
16 September 2011	Masahito, Prince Hitachi	Hanako, Princess Hitachi	Yuriko, Princess Mikasa	Fumihito, Prince Akishino
16 September 2015	Fumihito, Prince Akishino	Hanako, Princess Hitachi	Masahito, Prince Hitachi	Kiko, Princess Akishino
16 September 2019	Fumihito, Crown Prince Akishino	Hanako, Princess Hitachi	Yuriko, Princess Mikasa	Kiko, Crown Princess Akishino
7 September 2023	Fumihito, Crown Prince Akishino	Hanako, Princess Hitachi	Kiko, Crown Princess Akishino	Hisako, Princess Takamado

Princess Yori ceased to be a reserve member of the Council because she married on 10 October 1952 and thus became a commoner. Princess Takamatsu became a reserve member in replacement for her.

==== Recent elections ====
On 3 September 2003, Prince Mikasa was reelected to his fifteenth consecutive term of office since the Council's establishment. Crown Prince Naruhito was voted out. It was for the first time since 1963 that the crown prince was not elected as a member or reserve member of the Council.

On 5 September 2007, Empress Michiko, six princes and nine princesses voted to elect Prince and Princess Hitachi as members of the Council, and Princess Mikasa and Prince Akishino as reserve members. Prince Mikasa was reported to have excused himself for his old age in advance. Crown Prince Naruhito was not elected again while his brother, Prince Akishino was voted in for the first time. The next election was in September 2011.

On 7 September 2011, the regular election was held by the 18 adult members of the imperial family. This time the elections were not held at the Imperial Palace, but in an Agency conference room to reduce energy consumption. Both the members and reserve members were re-elected.

== See also ==
- Government of Japan
- Imperial Household Agency
