= Naoto Ōtani =

19th Chief Justice of Japan

The Honourable Naoto Ōtani
- 大谷 直人
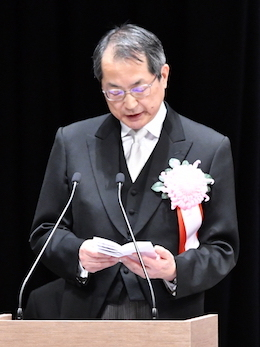
- Ōtani in 2019

19th Chief Justice of Japan
- In office January 9, 2018 – June 23, 2022
- Appointed by: Emperor Akihito
- Preceded by: Itsurō Terada
- Succeeded by: Saburo Tokura

Personal details
- Born: 大谷直人 (Ōtani Naoto); June 23, 1952 (age 74) Akabira, Hokkaido, Japan
- Education: University of Tokyo, Faculty of Law (1975)

Naoto Ōtani (大谷 直人, Ōtani Naoto; born June 23, 1952) is a Japanese lawyer who served as the 19th Chief Justice of the Supreme Court of Japan from 2018 to 2022.

== Early life and education ==
Ōtani was born in Akabira, Hokkaido, Japan. He graduated from the University of Tokyo, Faculty of Law in 1975, and became an Assistant Judge of the Tokyo District Court in 1977.

He became a Judge of the Tokyo District Court in 1994, a Professor at the Legal Training and Research Institute in 1995, and later served as a Judge of the Tokyo High Court in 2010. He became the Chief Judge of the Shizuoka District Court in 2011.

Before becoming Chief Justice, Ōtani was the President of the Osaka High Court and was also one of the Justices of the Supreme Court. He previously served as the Director-General of the Criminal Affairs Bureau and the Personnel Affairs Bureau, and as the Secretary-General of the Supreme Court, and is known for his role in designing the lay judge system of Japan.

== Chief Justice ==
At age 65, Ōtani replaced Itsurō Terada as Chief Justice on January 9, 2018, when Terada reached the date of his retirement.

Ōtani as Chief Justice, was formally appointed by the Emperor after being nominated by the Cabinet; which in practice, is known to be under the recommendation of the former Chief Justice.

He stepped down as Chief Justice in 2022 as he reached the mandatory retirement age of 70, and was succeeded by associate justice Saburo Tokura in June 2022.
