= Mibuchi Shinzaburō =

Japanese businessman in the insurance industry

- 三淵 震三郎
- Born: April 11, 1911; Fukushima Prefecture, Empire of Japan
- Died: March 20, 1989 (aged 77); Kanagawa Prefecture, Empire of Japan
- Occupation: Businessman
- Known for: Managing director of the General Insurance Rating Organization of Japan
- Relatives: Mibuchi Tadahiko, the Chief Justice of the Supreme Court

Mibuchi Shinzaburō (三淵 震三郎; 11 April 1911 – 20 March 1989) was a Japanese businessman who worked in the insurance industry.

== Early life ==
Shinzaburō was born in Fukushima in 1911, as the third son of Mibuchi Tadahiko, who was a Catholic Christian, a former court judge and worked for the Sumitomo Trust. His elder brother Mibuchi Kentaro became a court judge like his father. Shinzaburō graduated the Department of German law at the Waseda University in 1935.

His younger sister Tama married Ishiwatari Shingorō, the son of Ishiwatari Bin'ichi, the prominent jurist and a public prosecutor of the Supreme Court of Judicature of Japan, and who worked for Tokyo Kasai Hoken (Tokyo Fire Insurance) before becoming the senior official of the Manchukuo Government.

== Career ==
Shinzaburō joined the Dai Tokyo Kasai Kaijo Hoken (Dai-Tokyo Fire and Marine Insurance) in 1941, and was soon promoted to the head of the collection department. He married Tai Sorimachi, the daughter of its president, Sorimachi Mosaku, who was former president of te Nippon Yusen, the largest shipping company then in Japan.

After the war, in 1947, Shinzaburō's father Tadahiko was appointed as the first Chief Justice of Japan's newly established Supreme Court of Japan.

Shinzaburō later served as the managing director of the General Insurance Rating Organization of Japan.

== Death ==
He died of a heart attack at his home in Kanagawa Prefecture, on 20 March 1989. The funeral was held at Yukinoshita Catholic Church.
