= Jiro Terada =

Jiro Terada (寺田 治郎, Terada Jirō, 1915 – 2002) was a Japanese jurist who served as the 10th Chief Justice of Japan from 1982 to 1985. He is the father of Itsuro Terada, who served as Chief Justice from 2012 to 2018. He was a graduate of the University of Tokyo. He was a recipient of the Order of the Rising Sun.

Preceded by Takaaki Hattori	Chief Justice of Japan; 1982–1985	Succeeded by Koichi Yaguchi
