= Ryuko =

Ryuko, Ryūkō or Ryūko is a unisex Japanese name and may refer to:

== People ==
- Hayashi Ryūkō (林 榴岡, 1681–1758), Japanese Neo-Confucian scholar in the Edo period
- Ryuko Hira (born 1948), Indian-born businessman
- Ryuko Kawaji (川路 柳虹, 1888–1959), Japanese Shōwa period author
- Ryūkō Gō (剛 隆濤, born 1968), Brazilian sumo wrestler
- Ryūko Seihō (龍虎 勢朋, 1941–2014), Japanese sumo wrestler
- Ryuko Sakurai (桜井 龍子, born 1947), Japanese member of the Supreme Court of Japan
- Ryuko Tokimatsu (時松 隆光, born 1993), Japanese professional golfer

== Fictional characters ==
- Ryūko Kamikura (神倉 龍子), a character from Minami Kamakura High School Girls Cycling Club
- Ryūko Matoi (纏 流子), the main protagonist from the anime series Kill la Kill
- Ryūko Mifune (御船 流子), a character from Ground Control to Psychoelectric Girl
- Ryuko Mimori (三森 竜子), a detective from Doberman Deka
- Ryuko Okegawa (桶川 竜子), a character from Crayon Shin-chan
- Ryūko Tatsuma (竜間 龍子), a character from My Hero Academia
- Ryuko Tsuchikawa (土川 流子), a character from My Hero Academia
- Ryuko, the superheroine identity of the Kagami Tsurugi in Miraculous: Tales of Ladybug & Cat Noir

== Other uses ==
- "Ryūkō" (song), a 2009 song by musician Ringo Sheena
