= Toyozō =

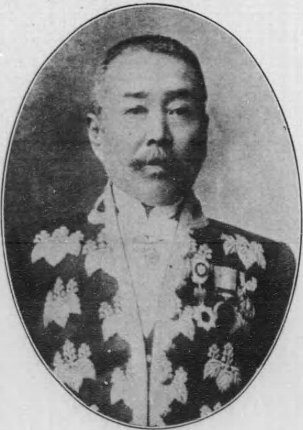
- Toyozo Takagi (1852–1918), Japanese judicial bureaucrat, judge, lawyer.
- Pronunciation: tojodzoɯ (IPA)
- Gender: Male

Origin
- Origin: Japanese
- Meaning: Different meanings depending on the kanji used

Other names
- Alternative spelling: Toyozou (Kunrei-shiki) Toyozou (Nihon-shiki) Toyozō, Toyozou, Toyozo, Toyozoh (Hepburn)

Toyozō is a masculine Japanese given name.

== Written forms ==
Toyozō can be written using different combinations of kanji characters. Here are some examples:

- 豊三, "bountiful, three"
- 豊蔵, "bountiful, store up"
- 豊造, "bountiful, create"
- 登代三, "climb up, generation, three"

The name can also be written in hiragana とよぞう or katakana トヨゾウ.

== Notable people with the name ==
- Toyozo Arakawa (荒川 豊蔵) (1894–1985), Japanese potter.
- Toyozo Takagi (高木 豊三, 1852–1918), Japanese judicial bureaucrat, judge, lawyer.
- Toyozo Ueda (上田 豊三) (born 1937), Japanese judge.
