= Imperial Household Administration =

The Imperial Household administration or office, may refer to:

- Imperial Household Department of Qing Dynasty China
- Ministry of the Imperial Household of Japan prior to 1889
- Imperial Household Agency of Japan after 1889
- Imperial Household Council of Japan after World War II

== See also ==
- imperial household
