= Takuya Miyama =

Japanese jurist

Takuya Miyama (深山 卓也, Miyama Takuya; born September 2, 1954) is a Japanese jurist who previously served as an associate justice of the Supreme Court of Japan from 2018 to 2024.

== Education and career ==
Miyama was born on September 2, 1954, in Japan. He attended the University of Tokyo and graduated with a degree in Law in 1979. He served as a judge in lower courts and as an officer in the Ministry of Justice for nearly 40 years before his appointment to the Supreme Court.

== Supreme Court ==
On January 9, 2018, Miyama was appointed to the Supreme Court of Japan. In Japan, justices are formally nominated by the Emperor (at that time, Akihito) but in reality the Cabinet chooses the nominees and the Emperor's role is a formality.

Miyama's term ended on September 1, 2024 (one day before he turns 70). This is because all members of the court have a mandatory retirement age of 70.
