= Hiroyuki Kanno =

Hiroyuki Kanno may refer to:

- Hiroyuki Kanno (game designer), Japanese game designer
- Hiroyuki Kanno (martial artist), Japanese martial artist
- Hiroyuki Kanno (jurist), associate Justice of the Supreme Court of Japan
