= Kizawa =

Kizawa (written: 木沢, 木澤 or 鬼沢) is a Japanese surname. Notable people with the surname include:

- Katsuyuki Kizawa (木澤 克之; born 1951), Japanese jurist
- Masanori Kizawa (木澤 正徳; born 1969), Japanese footballer
- Minoru Kizawa (鬼沢 稔), Japanese astronomer
- Kizawa Nagamasa (木沢 長政), Japanese daimyō
- Naofumi Kizawa (木澤 尚文; born 1998), Japanese baseball player
