= Yuko Miyazaki =

Yuko Miyazaki is a lawyer and former justice of the Supreme Court of Japan, serving from 2018 to 2021.

She was born on 9 July 1951. Miyazaki earned her legal education respectively from the University of Tokyo (Faculty of Law; 1976) and Harvard Law School (1984). In 1979, after having worked as a legal apprentice, Miyazaki registered with the Daiichi Tokyo Bar Association and began practicing as a taxation attorney. In 1979, she was hired as a permanent attorney at the law firm Nagashima & Ohno. She became legal counsel for the World Bank in 1984. Miyazaki also taught as a visiting professor at Tokyo University and Kyoto University. In January 2018, she became the sixth female appointed as a Justice of the Supreme Court of Japan. Miyazaki is noted as forgoing tradition and becoming the first justice to issue rulings under her maiden name. Members of the Supreme Court have a mandatory retirement age of 70, so Miyazaki retired in 2021.

She is appointed as International Judge of the Singapore International Commercial Court for the period of 5 January 2022 to 4 January 2024.

== Notable rulings ==
=== Separate last names case ===
On June 23, 2021, Miyazaki dissented in 11-4 decision involving a married couple that wished to have their marriage registration accepted under separate last names. The majority found that the provisions of the Civil Code of Japan and the Family Register Act that require married couples to have the same last name do not violate Article 24 of the Japanese Constitution, but in a dissenting option with Katsuya Uga, they would have ordered the city to accept their marriage registration.

== See also ==
- List of justices of the Supreme Court of Japan
- Supreme Court of Japan
- Singapore International Commercial Court
