= Itsurō =

- Gender: Male

Origin
- Origin: Japanese
- Meaning: Different meanings depending on the kanji used

Itsurō, Itsuro, Itsurou or Itsuroh (written: 逸郎 or 逸朗) is a masculine Japanese given name. Notable people with the name include:

- Itsuro Kawasaki (川崎 逸朗), Japanese anime director
- Itsurō Sakisaka (向坂 逸郎; 1897–1985), Japanese Marxian economist
- Itsurō Terada (寺田 逸郎; born 1948), Japanese lawyer
