= Masaharu Ōhashi =

Justice of the Supreme Court of Japan
- In office 13 February 2012 – 30 March 2017
- Preceded by: Kohei Nasu
- Succeeded by: Saburo Tokura

Personal details
- Born: March 31, 1947 (age 79) Tokyo, Allied-Occupied Japan
- Education: University of Tokyo; Harvard Law School
- Occupation: Judge

Masaharu Ōhashi (大橋正春, Masaharu Ōhashi; born March 31, 1947) is a former justice of the Supreme Court of Japan, serving from 2012 to 2017. He was appointed on 13 February 2012, succeeding Kohei Nasu on the Third Petty Bench. He passed the bar exam in 1968, received his LLB (in both Private Law and Public Law programs) from the University of Tokyo in 1969, and his LLM degree from Harvard Law School in 1976. Before joining the Supreme Court, he held a number of high-profile positions in the Japanese Federation of Bar Associations (JFBA) and was a co-founder/partner of Tokei Partners. He reportedly enjoys pottery, rakugo, and legal dramas.

== Honours ==
- Grand Cordon of the Order of the Rising Sun (2018)

Government offices
| Preceded by Kohei Nasu | Justice; Supreme Court of Japan; 2012-Present | Succeeded by Incumbent |
