= Tokiyasu Fujita =

Japanese jurist (born 1940)

Tokiyasu Fujita (Japanese 藤⽥宙靖; born April 6, 1940, in Tokyo) is a Japanese jurist, former judge of the Supreme Court of Japan (September 30, 2002-April 5, 2010), Professor Emeritus of Tohoku University, member of the Japan Academy, and member of the Imperial Household Council. His specialty is administrative law (PhD from the University of Tokyo in 1981). He was actively involved in the public debate surrounding the legal transformation of Japanese National Universities into corporations in 2004.

== Professional background ==
=== Education ===
- 1959: Graduation from High School of Tokyo University of Education (present: Junior and Senior High School at Otsuka, University of Tsukuba)
- 1963: Graduation from the Faculty of Law, University of Tokyo

=== Career ===
- 1963: Research Associate, Faculty of Law, University of Tokyo
- 1966: Assistant Professor, Faculty of Law, Tohoku University
- 1977: Professorship, Faculty of Law, Tohoku University
- 1994: Dean, Faculty of Law, Tohoku University (until 1996)
- 2001: Professorship, Graduate School of Law, Tohoku University
- 2002: Professor Emeritus, Tohoku University
- 2002: Appointment as Judge of the Supreme Court of Japan
- April 5th, 2010: Retirement as Judge of the Supreme Court of Japan

=== Appointments ===
- 1996: Member of the Administrative Reform Council [on Japan's ministerial bureaucracy] (until 1998)
- 2000: Member of the Committee for Settling National-Local Disputes
- 2001: Member of the National Land Development Council
- 2001: Member of the Investigation Committee for the Disclosure of Information
- 2001: Expert member of the Central Council for Education

== Rulings and legal opinions ==
- Legal opinion on the Constitutionality of the Lower House Election of September 11, 2005 (44th Election): Does the division system of single-member districts violate Article 14, Paragraph 1 et seq. of the Japanese Constitution? (Opinion: constitutional)
- Legal opinion: Is there a constitutional violation (Article 14, paragraph 1 et seq.) if regulative distinctions are made between party candidates and independent candidates in primary constituencies in the Lower House Election? (Opinion: constitutional)
- Legal opinion: does legitimation (of a child born out of wedlock) as necessary condition (Article 3, Paragraph 1 of the Japanese Nationality Act) violate Article 14, Paragraph 1 of the Japanese Constitution? (Opinion: unconstitutional because of a gap in the law; minority opinion).
- Legal opinion: does obligating a music teacher at Hino Municipal Elementary School by the principal to accompany the collective singing of the national anthem (Kimigayo) on the piano at the school entrance ceremony violate Article 19 of the Japanese Constitution? (View: unconstitutional)
- Dismissal of the appeal (2008) of the trial of the Nishiyama Incident (news reporters had disclosed confidential information obtained in the course of their reporting surrounding the return of Okinawa to Japan in 1971 to members of Parliament and were therefore found guilty by the Supreme Court of violating the Public Service Law).
- In the "Kôka Student Dormitory" case, in which the ownership of the dormitory acquired by the Republic of China (Taiwan) before the country's diplomatic separation from Japan was in dispute, the presiding judge of the Third Small Senate suddenly resumed the proceedings 20 years after the appeal. The court ruled that the proceedings had been suspended due to the severance of diplomatic relations 35 years earlier, and that the decisions of the four lower courts were therefore moot. The court ordered that the case be reopened from the first trial and remanded the case to the Kyoto District Court. This ruling was criticized by Taiwan's legal team, led by Shigeru Oda, a former Judge of 27 years at the International Court of Justice, due to a "lack of knowledge of international law and understanding of historical facts".
- Ruling in two appeals on the payment of a life insurance policy upon the simultaneous passing of a childless married couple, in which the wife was the beneficiary. The Court of Appeals ruled that only the wife's relatives could receive the premium and rejected appeals by the insurance company and agricultural cooperative, who claimed that "the husband's relatives [were] also entitled to the premium."
- The court ruled that original film works published in 1953 under the name of a collective were not covered by the extended term of copyright protection under the revised Copyright Act, and that this copyright therefore had expired on December 31, 2003. This overturned the view of the Agency for Cultural Affairs that film copyright would last until December 31st, 2023, and legally settled the so-called "1953 issue."
- As the chief judge of the Third Main Court in the case of the series of kidnappings and murders of teenagers in Tokyo and Saitama from 1988 to 1989, on, he rejected the defense appeal against defendant Tsutomu Miyazaki on January 17, 2006, upholding the latter's death sentence.

== Personal life ==
=== Family ===
His father Ichirō Fujita (Japanese 藤⽥⼀郎), was vice chairman of Fujita Gumi (construction company) as well as a member of the Japanese Lower House for the Japan Socialist Party.

=== Philosophy of life ===
Know thyself and trust thyself!

=== Formative literature ===
- Toshio Takashima: Kanji to Nihonjin [Kanji and the Japanese]
- Takehiro Kanaya: Nihongo no shugo ha iranai [Japanese Language needs no Subject]
- Helen Mears: Amerika no Kagami: Nihon [America's mirror: Japan]
- Robert McNamara: In Retrospect: The Tragedy and Lessons of Vietnam
- John W. Dower: Embracing Defeat: Japan in the Wake of World War II

=== Interests ===
- Piano (elementary school through high school)
- Japanese Archery in Honda Style (university)
- Noh song and dance in "Kanze" Style (time as assistant professor to professor)
- Skiing (since high school)
- Swimming

=== Awards ===
- Authorship Award by the Japan Real Estate Association ("Land Law in West Germany and Japan")
- Grand Cordon of the Order of the Rising Sun (Autumn 2011)

== Publications ==
=== As author ===
- Kôkenryoku no kôshi to shiteki Kenri shucchô: Otto Beeru "Hôchikoku" no Tachiba to Doitsu Gyôsei Hôgaku [Exercising Governmental Power and Asserting Private Rights: Otto Baer's Concept of the "Rule of Law" and German Administrative Law Scholarship] (Yûhikaku, 1978)
- Nishi Doitsu no Tochihô to Nihon no Tochihô [Land Law in West Germany and Japan] (Sôbunsha, 1988)
- Gyôsei Hôgaku no Shikô Keishiki (Zôhoban) [Thought patterns in administrative law (extended edition)] (Dotakusha 2002)
- Gyôseihô no Kiso Riron (Jô, Gekan) [Basic Theories of Administrative Law (Volume 1&2)] (Yûhikaku, 2005)
- Gyôsei Soshikihô [Administrative Organization Law] [Yûhikaku, 2005]
- Gendai Hôritsugaku Kôza Gyôseihô 1 Sôron (Dai 4 Han Kaitei) [Course Contemporary Law : General Introduction to Administrative Law 1 (4th Revised Edition).] (Seirin Shoin, 2005)
- Saikôsai Kaisôroku Gakusha Hanji no Nana Nen Han [Memories of the Supreme Court: Seven and a Half Years of a Scientific Judge] (Yûhikaku, 2012)
- Gyôseihô Nyûmon (Dai 6 Han) [Introduction to Administrative Law (6th Edition)] (Yûhikaku, 2013)
- Shinban Gyôseihô Sôron [New Edition: General Introduction to Administrative Law] (Seirin Shoin, 2020)

=== As editor ===
- Kenpô to Gyôseihô: Kojima Kazushi Hakushi Tôhoku Daigaku Taishoku Kinen [Constitution and Administrative Law: Festschrift for Dr. Kazushi Kojima on his retirement from Tohoku University] (Ryosho Fukyûkai, 1987)
- Kenpô Ronshû Higuchi Yôichi Sensei Koki Kinenkan [Essay Collection on the Constitution: Celebratory Writing Collection for Yôichi Higuchi on his 70th Birthday.] (Sôbunsha, 2004)
