= Katsuya Uga =

Japanese judge

Katsuya Uga (born July 21, 1955) is a Japanese jurist who served as an associate justice of the Supreme Court of Japan from 2019 to 2025.

== Education and career ==
Uga was born on July 21, 1955, in Japan. He attended the University of Tokyo and graduated with a degree in law in 1978. In 1981 he began teaching law at that university. He was promoted to full professor on 2004 and taught until his appointment to the Supreme Court in 2019. He was a visiting researcher/professor at several universities, including Harvard University (in 1983 and in 1990), UC Berkeley (in 1984), and Georgetown University (in 1998).

== Supreme Court ==
On March 20, 2019, Uga was appointed to the Supreme Court of Japan. In Japan, justices are formally nominated by the Emperor (at that time, Akihito) but in reality the Cabinet chooses the nominees and the Emperor's role is a formality.

Uga's term ended on July 20, 2025 (one day before he turned 70). This is because all members of the court have a mandatory retirement age of 70.
