= Akira Machida =

- Born: October 16, 1936; Shimonoseki, Japan
- Died: April 5, 2015 (aged 78)

Akira Machida (町田 顯 Machida Akira, October 16, 1936 – April 5, 2015) was Chief Justice of the Supreme Court of Japan from 2002 to 2006.

He was born in Shimonoseki, Japan.

He first began his career in 1959, when he was appointed as a legal apprentice. In 1961 he was appointed as an assistant judge to the Tokyo District and its Family Court, the judge of the Muroran branch of the Sapporo District and its Family Court, and the judge of the Civil Affairs Bureau of the General Secretariat of the Supreme Court. In 1971 he was promoted to judge of the Sapporo District and its Family Court.

In 1973 he became Chief of the Budget Division, Financial Affairs Bureau, and General Secretariat of the Supreme Court. He began serving as the Chief of the General Affairs Division in 1975, and although he quit being Chief of the Budget Division, he continued to perform in his other two positions until 1977, when he became Counsellor of the Cabinet Legislative Bureau. In 1983 he was appointed as a judge of the Tokyo District, and a presiding judge of the Division.

From 1984 until 1991 he regained his position as General Secretariat of the Supreme Court; however, he also attained the status of Director of the Secretary and Public Information Division in 1984, which he kept until 1986 when he became Director of the Financial Affairs Bureau. In 1991 he became Chief Judge of the Kofu District Court and its Family Court. In 1993 he became Chief Judge of the Chiba District Court. In 1994 he was appointed judge of the Tokyo High Court, and a presiding judge of the Division. In 1998 he began serving as president of the Fukuoka High Court. In 1999 he became president of the Tokyo High Court.

In 2000 he was appointed as a justice of the Supreme Court of Japan. He was appointed Chief Justice on November 6, 2002. One notable case his court has presided over, but he himself did not participate in, was over whether Japanese nationals living in foreign countries had the constitutional right to vote for a specific candidate in parliamentary elections. In addition, Chief Justice Machida voted with the majority to overturn a ruling from the Tokyo High Court that said the Tokyo Metropolitan Government could not bar a civil servant from her managerial exam due to her South Korean nationality. On October 15, 2006, Akira Machida retired upon reaching the age of 70. He was succeeded by Niro Shimada.

== See also ==
- Judicial system of Japan
