= Onimaru =

Onimaru may refer to:

- Onimaru, a character in the 1988 film Wuthering Heights
- Kaoru Onimaru (鬼丸 かおる, born 1949), Japanese lawyer and judge
