= Ikegami =

Ikegami may refer to:

== Companies ==
- Ikegami Tsushinki, manufacturer of broadcast television equipment

== People ==
- Akira Ikegami (池上 彰; born 1950), Japanese journalist and author
- Eiko Ikegami (池上 英子; born 1950), Japanese academic, author and professor
- Haruki Ikegami, victim of the bombing of Philippine Airlines Flight 434
- Hidetsugu Ikegami, Japanese physicist
- Joji Ikegami (池上 丈二; born 1994), Japanese football player
- Kimiko Ikegami (池上 季実子; born 1959), American-born Japanese actress
- Masayuki Ikegami (池上 政幸; born 1951), Japanese jurist
- Reiichi Ikegami (池上 礼一; born 1983), Japanese former football player
- Ryoichi Ikegami (池上 遼一; born 1944), Japanese manga artist
- Sarii Ikegami (池上 紗理依; born 1995), Japanese actress, model, and gravure idol
- Takashi Ikegami (池上 高志; born 1961), Japanese professor at the University of Tokyo

== Places ==
- Ikegami Honmon-ji
- Ikegami Station

== Train lines ==
- Tōkyū Ikegami Line
