= French National School for the Judiciary =

French judicial school

Coordinates: 44°50′12″N 0°34′45″W

ENM
- École nationale de la Magistrature
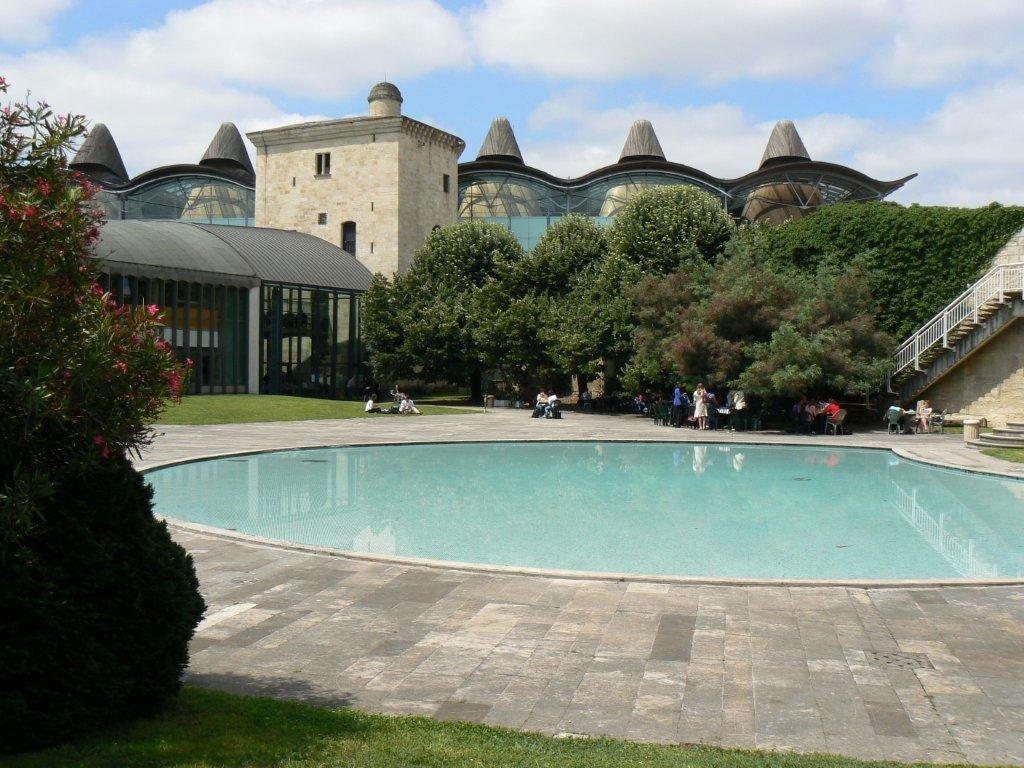
- Type: Public
- Established: 1959
- Director: Nathalie Roret
- Academic staff: 100
- Students: 550
- Location: Bordeaux, France

The French National School for the Judiciary (French: École nationale de la magistrature or ENM) is a French grande école, founded in 1958 by French President Charles de Gaulle and the father of the current French Constitution, Michel Debré, in order to encourage law students to embrace a judicial career. Originally referred to as the National Centre for Judicial Studies (French: Centre national d'études judiciaires), it was renamed the French National School for the Judiciary in 1972.

The ENM selects and undertakes initial training of the French Judiciary, which encompasses two different categories of professionals : judges and public prosecutors. It is considered to be of the most academically exceptional French schools, partly due to its low acceptance rates. In 2021, 4612 people were candidates for 150 admissions.

It is located in Bordeaux and has premises in Paris.

== Initial training ==
The aim of the training provided by the ENM is to form a corps of judges and public prosecutors who are suitable for all posts on the bench as well as in the public prosecution service in first instance courts. The judicial functions are :

- Tribunal Judiciaire judge
- Contentieux de la protection (small claims) judge
- Investigating judge
- Juvenile Court judge
- Probation judge
- Deputy Public Prosecutor

A prospective judge or deputy public prosecutor must complete a Bachelor in Law (which requires three years of study) and a Master in Law (which requires one year of study) before entering the National School for the Judiciary. Admission is made through an entrance examination or application through recruitment procedures. Judges and public prosecutors follow identical training at the ENM and may be called upon to change jobs during the course of their career, from judge to prosecutor or vice versa.

In 2021, 4612 people were candidates for 150 admissions. French citizenship is required for admission to the French National School for the Judiciary.

== See also ==
- Federal Judicial Center, an education and research agency of the US federal courts
- Judicial College, an organisation responsible for training judges in the UK
- Legal Research and Training Institute, an institute operated by the Supreme Court of Japan for research and training of new attorneys, prosecutors and judges
