= Wakui =

Wakui (written: 涌井 or 和久井) is a Japanese surname. Notable people with the surname include:

- Emi Wakui (和久井 映見, born 1970), Japanese actress
- Hideaki Wakui (涌井 秀章, born 1986), Japanese baseball player
- Hidetoshi Wakui (和久井 秀俊, born 1983), Japanese footballer
- Norio Wakui (涌井 紀夫, 1942–2009), Japanese judge
- Yū Wakui (和久井 優, born 1995), Japanese voice actor
