= Koichi Kusano =

Japanese jurist

Kōichi Kusano (Kusano Koichi; born March 22, 1955) is a Japanese jurist who served as an associate justice of the Supreme Court of Japan from 2019 to 2025.

== Education and career ==
Kusano was born on March 22, 1955, in Japan. He attended the University of Tokyo and graduated with a degree in Law in 1978. He was appointed as a legal apprentice that same year. In 1980 he registered as an attorney, and in 1986 he received his Master of Laws degree from Harvard Law School. He continued as an attorney until 1994, when he became an auditor for Koito Manufacturing. In 1999 he became the director of Rakuten, a post which he held until 2004, when he entered into academia. From 2004 until 2018 he served as professor or visiting professor at several universities, including:

- 2004-2005, 2007-2013: University of Tokyo Graduate School for Law and Politics
- 2005-2007: Kyoto University Law School
- 2013-2014: Keio University Law School
- 2014-2018: Harvard Law School

He then received his Ph.D in Law in 2018, before his appointment to the Supreme Court in 2019.

== Supreme Court ==
On February 13, 2019, Kusano was appointed to the Supreme Court of Japan. In Japan, justices are formally nominated by the Emperor (at that time, Akihito) but in reality the Cabinet chooses the nominees and the Emperor's role is a formality.

Kusano's term ended on March 21, 2025 (one day before he turned 70). This is because all members of the court have a mandatory retirement age of 70.
