= Ryōsuke Yasunami =

Japanese judge (born 1957)

Ryosuke Yasunami (born April 19, 1957) is a Japanese jurist who has served as an associate Justice of the Supreme Court of Japan since 2021.

== Education and career ==
Yasunami was born on April 19, 1957, in Japan. He attended the University of Tokyo and graduated with a degree in law in 1981. Yasunami served as a judge in various lower courts for nearly 40 years before his appointment to the Supreme Court. Yasunami served in the following positions:

- 1983-93: Judge, Hiroshima District Court
- 1993-95: Judge, Kobe District Court
- 1995-98: Judge, Tokyo District Court
- 1998-99: Director, Second Division of the Administrative Affairs Bureau, Supreme Court
- 1999-2001: Director, First and Third Divisions of the Administrative Affairs Bureau, Supreme Court
- 2001-05: Director, Re-numeration Division of the Personnel Affairs Bureau, Supreme Court
- 2005-07: Presiding Judge, Tokyo District Court
- 2007-10: Director of Secretariat, Tokyo High Court
- 2010-11: Presiding Judge, Tokyo District Court
- 2011-14: Director General, Personnel Affairs Bureau, Supreme Court
- 2014-16: President, Shizuoka District Court
- 2016-18: Presiding Judge, Tokyo High Court
- 2018: President, Tokyo District Court
- 2018-21: President, Osaka High Court

== Supreme Court ==
On July 16, 2021, Yasunami was appointed to the Supreme Court of Japan. In Japan, justices are formally nominated by the Emperor (at that time, Naruhito) but in reality the Cabinet chooses the nominees and the Emperor's role is a formality.

Yasunami's term is scheduled to end on April 18, 2027 (one day before he turns 70). This is because all members of the court have a mandatory retirement age of 70.
