= Itsuo Sonobe =

Japanese lawyer and judge (1929–2024)

- 園部逸夫

Justice of the Supreme Court of Japan
- In office 21 September 1989 – 31 March 1999
- Preceded by: Masami Itō
- Succeeded by: Masamichi Okuda

Personal details
- Born: 1 April 1929 Korea, Empire of Japan
- Died: 13 September 2024 (aged 95)
- Education: Graduate School of Law and Faculty of Law, Kyoto University
- Occupation: Lawyer; Judge

Itsuo Sonobe (Japanese: 園部逸夫 Sonobe Itsuo; 1 April 1929 – 13 September 2024) was a Japanese lawyer and politician. He served as a Justice of the Supreme Court from 1989 to 1999.

Sonobe died on 13 September 2024, at the age of 95.
