= Mamoru Miura =

Japanese jurist

Mamoru Miura (三浦 守, Miura Mamoru; born October 23, 1956) is a Japanese jurist who served as an associate Justice of the Supreme Court of Japan from 2018 to 2026.

== Education and career ==
Miura was born on October 23, 1956, in Japan. He attended the University of Tokyo and graduated with a degree in Law in 1980. He served first as a public prosecutor in several district courts, then as an official in the Ministry of Justice, then finally as a Superintending Prosecutor in several regional courts before being appointed to the Supreme Court.

== Supreme Court ==
On February 26, 2018, Miura was appointed to the Supreme Court of Japan. In Japan, justices are formally nominated by the Emperor (at that time, Akihito) but in reality the Cabinet chooses the nominees and the Emperor's role is a formality.

Miura's term ended on October 22, 2026 (one day before he turns 70). All members of the court have a mandatory retirement age of 70.
