= Osamu Tsuno =

Japanese judge

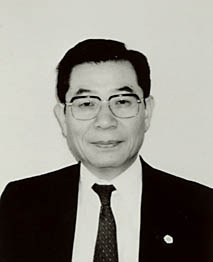
Osamu Tsuno

Osamu Tsuno (津野 修, Tsuno Osamu; born 20 October 1938) is a Japanese official and jurist who served as justice of the Supreme Court from 2004 to 2008 and as Director General of the Cabinet Legislation Bureau from 1999 to 2002.

Tsuno studied law at Kyoto University, graduated in 1962 and joined the Ministry of Finance. He held several positions in the Ministry before being transferred to the Cabinet Legislation Bureau in 1986, becoming director of the Third Department. He successively became director of the First Department in 1992, Deputy Director General in 1996 and Director General in 1999. He retired in 2002. He was appointed to the Supreme Court in 2004 and served until 2008, when he reached the obligatory retirement age.
