= Chief Justice of the Supreme Court of Japan =

Chief judicial officer of Japan

Chief Justice of the Supreme Court of Japan 最高裁判所長官
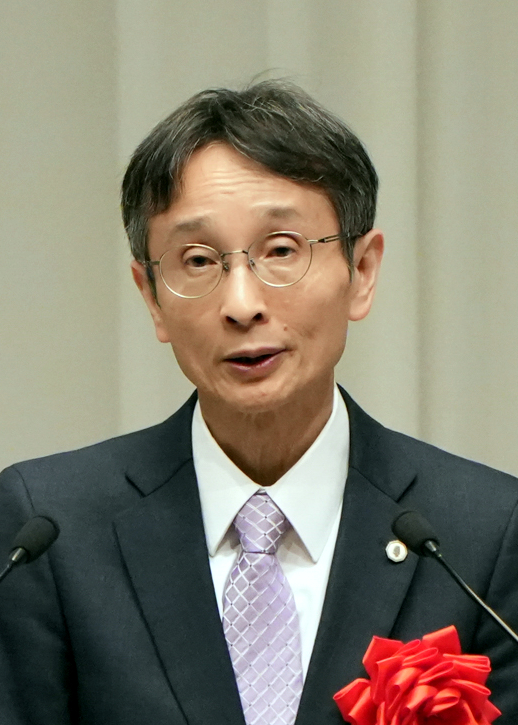
- Incumbent; Yukihiko Imasaki since 16 August 2024
- Supreme Court of Japan
- Style: His Excellency; Your Honor; The Honourable
- Member of: Supreme Court of Japan
- Appointer: The Emperor; Nominated by the Cabinet
- Term length: Mandatory retirement age of 70
- Formation: August 4, 1947; 79 years ago
- First holder: Tadahiko Mibuchi
- Salary: ¥24,120,000
- Website: www.courts.go.jp

The chief justice of the Supreme Court of Japan (最高裁判所長官, Saikōsaibansho-chōkan) is the chief judge of the Supreme Court of Japan and is the head of the judicial branch of the Japanese government.

The chief justice is ceremonially appointed by the emperor of Japan after being nominated by the Cabinet; in practice, this is following the recommendation of the retiring chief justice.

== List of chief justices of the Supreme Court of Japan ==
Name	Kanji	Appointment date
Tadahiko Mibuchi	三淵忠彦	August 4, 1947
Kōtarō Tanaka	田中耕太郎	March 3, 1950
Kisaburo Yokota	横田喜三郎	October 25, 1960
Masatoshi Yokota	横田正俊	August 6, 1966
Kazuto Ishida	石田和外	January 11, 1969
Tomokazu Murakami	村上朝一	May 21, 1973
Ekizo Fujibayashi	藤林益三	May 25, 1976
Masao Okahara	岡原昌男	August 26, 1977
Takaaki Hattori	服部高顯	April 2, 1979
Jiro Terada	寺田治郎	October 1, 1982
Koichi Yaguchi	矢口洪一	November 5, 1985
Ryohachi Kusaba	草場良八	February 20, 1990
Toru Miyoshi	三好達	November 7, 1995
Shigeru Yamaguchi	山口繁	October 31, 1997
Akira Machida	町田顯	November 6, 2002
Niro Shimada	島田仁郎	October 16, 2006
Hironobu Takesaki	竹崎博允	November 21, 2008
Itsurō Terada	寺田逸郎	April 1, 2014
Naoto Ōtani	大谷直人	January 9, 2018
Saburo Tokura	戸倉三郎	June 24, 2022
Yukihiko Imasaki	今崎幸彦	August 16, 2024

== See also ==
- List of justices of the Supreme Court of Japan
