= Seishi Kanetsuki =

Seishi Kanetsuki (金築 誠志, Kanetsuki Seishi; born April 1, 1945) served as a member of the Supreme Court of Japan from 2009 to 2015.
