= Hiroyuki Kanno (jurist) =

Japanese judge

Hiroyuki Kanno (born July 3, 1952) is a Japanese jurist who served as an associate Justice of the Supreme Court of Japan from 2016 to 2022.

== Education and career ==
Kanno was born on July 3, 1952, in Japan. He attended Tohoku University and graduated with a degree in law in 1978. That year, he was appointed as a legal apprentice. In 1980, Kanno joined the Family Court of the Tokyo District Court as a judge. Starting in 1990, Kanno served as a justice in many different Japanese courts. These include:

- 1990-1991: Judge, Tokyo District Court.
- 1991-1995: Judge, Sapporo Family Court.
- 1995-2000: Research official for the Supreme Court of Japan.
- 2000-2002: Judge, Tokyo High Court
- 2002-2012: Presiding Judge, Tokyo District Court
- 2012-2014: Chief Judge, Mito District Court
- 2014-2015: Presiding Judge, Tokyo High Court
- 2015-2016: Presiding Judge, Osaka High Court

== Supreme Court ==
On September 5, 2016, Kanno was appointed to the Supreme Court of Japan. In Japan, justices are formally nominated by the Emperor (at that time, Akihito) but in reality the Cabinet chooses the nominees and the Emperor's role is a formality.

Kanno's term ended on July 2, 2022 (one day before he turned 70). This is because all members of the court have a mandatory retirement age of 70.
