= Itsurō Terada =

- 寺田 逸郎

Chief Justice of the Supreme Court of Japan
- In office 1 April 2014 – 8 January 2018
- Appointed by: Emperor Akihito
- Preceded by: Hironobu Takesaki
- Succeeded by: Naoto Ōtani

Personal details
- Born: 9 January 1948 (age 78) Kyoto, Kyoto Prefecture, Japan
- Education: University of Tokyo

Itsurō Terada (寺田 逸郎, Terada Itsurō; born 9 January 1948) is a Japanese lawyer who served as Chief Justice of the Supreme Court of Japan from 2014 to 2018.

== Early life and education ==
Terada was born in Kyoto, Kyoto Prefecture, Japan. He was born into a family of great judicial significance. His father, Jirō Terada, was the Supreme Court's 10th Chief Justice. In 1972, he graduated from the University of Tokyo, Faculty of Law.

By 1980, Terada had held various positions as Assistant Judge in several District Courts, the Tokyo District Court in 1974, the Sapporo District Court in 1977 and the Osaka District Court in 1980. Terada was also the Ambassador of Japan to the Netherlands in 1981. He then moved to the Ministry of Justice in 1988, where he served as the Director-General of the Judicial System Department and the Civil Affairs Bureau.

Before becoming Chief Justice, Terada was the President of the Hiroshima High Court and was also one of the Justices of the Supreme Court.

== Chief Justice ==
At age 66, Terada replaced Hironobu Takesaki as Chief Justice on 1 April 2014, when Takesaki reached the date of his retirement.

Terada as Chief Justice, was formally appointed by the Emperor after being nominated by the Cabinet; which in practice, is known to be under the recommendation of the former Chief Justice. It was the first time since the ratification of the Japanese Constitution in 1947, that a father and son have both held the top judiciary position. He retired on 8 January 2018, when he reached the mandatory retirement age of 70.

In June 2020, Terada was appointed adviser to the Imperial Household Agency.

== Honours ==
- Japan:
  - Grand Cordon of the Order of the Paulownia Flowers (2019)
- Netherlands:
  - Knight Grand Cross of the Order of Orange-Nassau (29 October 2014)
