= Masaki Oka =

Japanese lawyer

Masaki Ota (born February 2, 1956) is a Japanese jurist who has served as an associate Justice of the Supreme Court of Japan from 2021 until 2026.

== Education and career ==
Ota was born on February 2, 1956, in Japan. He graduated from high school in Takamatsu, Kagawa Prefecture in 1974.

He attended the University of Tokyo and graduated with a degree in law in 1980. Before his appointment to the Supreme Court, he worked as an attorney, auditor, and university lecturer.

== Supreme Court ==
On September 3, 2021, Ota was appointed to the Supreme Court of Japan. In Japan, justices are formally nominated by the Emperor (at that time, Naruhito) but in reality the Cabinet chooses the nominees and the Emperor's role is a formality.

Ota's term ended on February 1, 2026 (one day before his seventieth birthday). This is because all members of the court have a mandatory retirement age of 70.
