= Katsuyuki Kizawa =

Katsuyuki Kizawa (Kizawa Katsuyuki; born August 27, 1951) is a Japanese jurist who served as an associate Justice of the Supreme Court of Japan from 2016 to 2021.

== Education and career ==
Kizawa was born on August 27, 1951, in Japan (then under United States occupation). He attended Rikkyo University and graduated with a degree in Law in 1974. Kizawa spent over 40 years as a professor and lawyer before joining the Supreme Court.

He was admitted to the bar in 1977 under the Tokyo Bar Association, and became a permanent Councilor in 1983. He obtained several leadership positions in the Bar Association, including:

- Vice Chairperson of the Human Rights Committee, 1981–88
- Vice Chairperson of the Training of Lawyers Committee, 1988–94
- Vice Chairperson of the Legal Trainees Training Committee, 1994-1995 and 2004–08
- Vice Chairperson of the Human Resources Committee, 1995-2000 and 2008–09

He began teaching at Rikkyo University (his alma mater) in 2004 and continued until his appointment to the Supreme Court.

== Supreme Court ==
On July 19, 2016, Kizawa was appointed to the Supreme Court of Japan. In Japan, justices are formally nominated by the Emperor (at that time, Akihito) but in reality the Cabinet chooses the nominees and the Emperor's role is a formality.

Kizawa's term ended on August 26, 2021 (one day before he turns 70). This is because all members of the court have a mandatory retirement age of 70.
