= Singapore International Commercial Court =

The Singapore International Commercial Court (SICC) was established on 5 January 2015.

The idea to create the SICC was mooted by Chief Justice Sundaresh Menon at the Opening of Legal Year 2013, with a key feature being the internationalisation of the court.

Soon thereafter on 13 May 2013, a committee was formed and co-chaired by Senior Minister of State for Law, and Education Indranee Rajah and Judge of Appeal V. K. Rajah comprising eminent international and local lawyers and legal experts was officially constituted to study the viability of the developing a framework for the establishment of the SICC.

The Report of the Singapore International Commercial Court Committee was released on 29 November 2013. A public consultation was soon conducted between 3 December 2013 and 31 January 2014.

The framework for the establishment of the SICC was finalised in the fourth quarter of 2014, and on 5 January 2015, saw the birth of the Singapore International Commercial Court. A key feature of the court is the inclusion of international judges.

The court served as an inspiration for the creation of the China International Commercial Court.

== Judges of the SICC ==
The SICC is a division of the General Division of the Singapore High Court and part of the Supreme Court of Singapore. All appeals from the SICC will be heard by the Court of Appeal of Singapore. Singapore High Court Judges and International Judges of the Supreme Court may be designated by the Chief Justice to hear cases in the SICC. The Chief Justice and Judges of Appeal may also hear cases in the SICC. The Chief Justice and Judges of Appeal, including Judges, Senior Judges and International Judges designated by the Chief Justice, may hear appeals from the SICC. There are 17 International Judges from both civil and common law countries around the world.

Panel of International Judges of the SICC
1	Justice Carolyn Berger	11	Justice Lord Neuberger of Abbotsbury
2	Justice Patricia Bergin	12	Justice Sir Vivian Ramsey
3	Justice Sir Jeremy Cooke	13	Justice Anselmo Reyes
4	Justice Sir Bernard Eder	14	Justice Sir Bernard Rix
5	Justice Robert French	15	Justice Arjan Kumar Sikri
6	Justice Roger Giles	16	Justice Simon Thorley QC
7	Justice Dominique T Hascher	17	Justice Yuko Miyazaki
8	Justice Douglas Jones AO		
9	Justice Lord Mance		
10	Justice Beverley McLachlin PC		
