= Saburo Tokura =

20th Chief Justice of Japan

The Honourable Saburo Tokura
- 戸倉 三郎
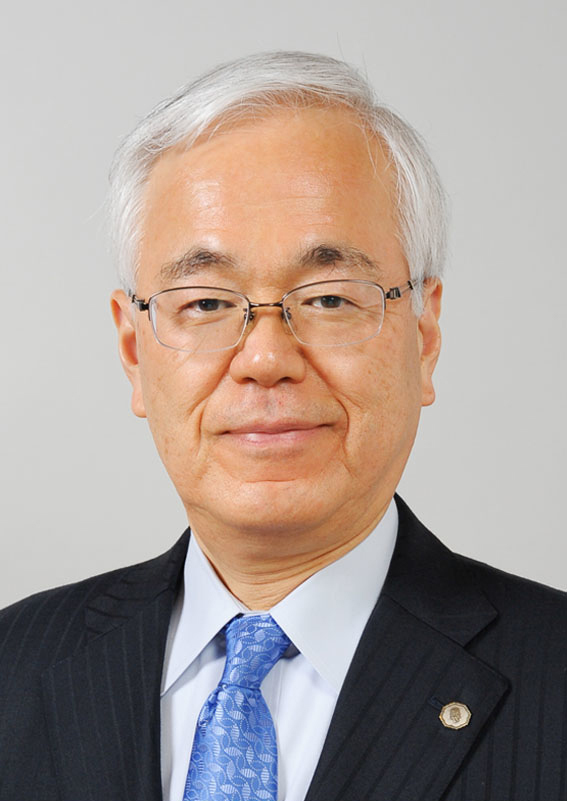
- Tokura in c. 2022.

20th Chief Justice of Japan
- In office June 23, 2022 – August 10, 2024
- Appointed by: Emperor Naruhito
- Preceded by: Naoto Ōtani
- Succeeded by: Yukihiko Imasaki

Personal details
- Born: 戸倉 三郎 (Tokura Saburo); August 11, 1954 (age 72) Tokuyama, Yamaguchi, Japan
- Education: Hitotsubashi University, Faculty of Law

Saburo Tokura (戸倉 三郎, Tokura Saburo; born August 11, 1954) is a Japanese jurist who served as the 20th Chief Justice of Japan from 2022 to 2024, having previously served as an Associate Justice on the Supreme Court of Japan from 2017 to 2022.

== Education and career ==
Tokura was born on August 11, 1954, in Japan. He attended Hitotsubashi University and graduated with a degree in Law in 1980. Tokura spent over 35 years serving on lower courts before his appointment to the Supreme Court in 2017.

From 1982 to 1992, Tokura served on the district courts of Osaka, Sapporo, and Tokyo, as part of the departments of Civil Affairs and Personal Affairs.

In 1992, he was appointed as a judge in the Tokyo District Court. He kept this job until 1998, despite also serving as a professor since 1994. In 1998 he was moved to the Hiroshima district court, and was appointed the Presiding judge in 1999.

From 2000 to 2008 he served as Counselor of various bureaus in the Supreme Court. In 2008, he became presiding Judge of the Tokyo District Court. In 2013, he was moved to the Tokyo High Court (a court of appeals). He later became the president of this Court in 2016.

On June 23, 2022, Tokura was attested by Emperor Naruhito and took office as the 20th Chief Justice of Japan.

== Supreme Court ==
On March 14, 2017, Tokura was appointed to the Supreme Court of Japan. The Chief Justice was formally appointed by the Emperor (at that time, Akihito) but as the Emperor may not reject the Cabinet's nominee, in practice Tokura was appointed by Prime Minister Shinzo Abe.

Tokura's term ended on August 10, 2024 (one day before he turns 70). This is because all members of the court have a mandatory retirement age of 70.
