= Masayuki Ikegami =

Japanese judge

Masayuki Ikegami (Ikegami Masayuki; born August 29, 1951) is a Japanese jurist who served as an associate Justice of the Supreme Court of Japan from 2014 to 2021.

== Education and career ==
Ikegami was born on August 29, 1951, in Japan. He attended Tohoku University and graduated with a degree in Law in 1975. Ikegami spent over 35 years serving as a public prosecutor in various offices in the Japanese government before his appointment to the Supreme Court in 2014. In 1977 (two years after his graduation from law school), Ikegami was appointed as a public prosecutor. He served in several district prosecutor offices including in the districts of Tokyo, Mito, Sendai, and Kushiro from 1977 to 1998. From 1998 to 2005 he served as director of several offices in the Criminal Affairs Bureau of the Japanese Ministry of Justice, including: Criminal Affairs Division (1998-2000), General Affairs Division (2000–01), and the Personnel Division (2001–05).

In 2005 he was promoted to Deputy Vice-Minister of Justice, a post he held until 2008. From 2008 to 2012 he served in various roles in the Supreme Public Prosecutor's Office, including: Director of the Trial Department (2008–10), Director of the Criminals Affairs Department (2010-2011), and as Deputy Prosecutor-General (2011–12). In 2012, he became the Superintending Prosecutor of the Nagoya High Public Prosecutors Office.

== Supreme Court ==
On October 2, 2014, Ikegami was appointed to the Supreme Court of Japan. In Japan, justices are formally nominated by the Emperor (at that time, Akihito) but in reality the Cabinet chooses the nominees and the Emperor's role is a formality.

Ikegami's term ended on August 28, 2021 (one day before he turns 70). This is because all members of the court have a mandatory retirement age of 70.
