= Kazuko Yokoo =

- 横尾 和子
- Born: April 14, 1941 (age 85)
- Education: International Christian University
- Occupation: Former justice of the Supreme Court of Japan
- Years active: 2001–2008

Kazuko Yokoo (横尾 和子, Yokoo Kazuko; born April 14, 1941) is a former justice of the Supreme Court of Japan. She was the second woman in history to serve in that role.

== Career ==
She attended International Christian University and became a bureaucrat in the Ministry of Health and Welfare after graduation. She was appointed as head of Japan's social insurance system in 1994, and as ambassador to the Republic of Ireland in 1998. In 2001, she was appointed to the Supreme Court.

In September 2008, Yokoo resigned two years and seven months prior to the mandatory retirement age of 70. Ryuko Sakurai replaced Yokoo.
