= Kohei Nasu =

Kohei Nasu (那須 弘平, Nasu Kōhei; born February 11, 1942) is a former member of the Supreme Court of Japan. He was appointed to the court on May 25, 2006, and reached mandatory retirement age in 2012. He was succeeded by Masaharu Ōhashi.
