= Kaoru Onimaru =

Japanese lawyer (born 1949)

Justice of the Supreme Court of Japan

Personal details
- Born: February 7, 1949 (age 77) Tokyo, Allied-Occupied Japan
- Education: University of Tokyo
- Occupation: Judge

Kaoru Onimaru (鬼丸 かおる, Onimaru Kaoru) is a lawyer and former Justice of the Supreme Court of Japan. She was born on February 7, 1949. In 1973, she earned her law degree from the University of Tokyo. On February 16, 2013, Onimaru was appointed as a Justice of the Supreme Court of Japan. Prior to her judgeship, Onimaru practiced for decades as a family law attorney. She had also served as a member of the National Life Council of the Cabinet Office and the Ministry of Health, Labor and Welfare Labor Insurance Review Board. She retired from the bench on February 6, 2019, and currently serves as a LIXIL Group Board of Director.

== See also ==
- List of justices of the Supreme Court of Japan
- Supreme Court of Japan
