= Hironobu Takesaki =

Japanese lawyer

The Honourable Hironobu Takesaki
- 竹崎 博允

17th Chief Justice of Japan
- In office November 25, 2008 – March 31, 2014
- Appointed by: Emperor Akihito
- Preceded by: Niro Shimada
- Succeeded by: Itsurō Terada

Personal details
- Born: 竹崎博允 (Takesaki Hironobu); July 8, 1944 (age 82) Okayama Prefecture, Japan
- Education: University of Tokyo; Columbia University

Hironobu Takesaki (竹崎 博允, Takesaki Hironobu; born July 8, 1944) is a Japanese lawyer and a former Chief Justice of the Supreme Court of Japan. He is a graduate of the University of Tokyo Faculty of Law and of Columbia Law School.

At age 64, Takesaki replaced Niro Shimada as the Chief Justice when November 21, 2008, the date of Shimada's mandatory retirement, came. He retired in March 2014.

Takesaki has been harshly criticized by former judge Hiroshi Segi in his book Zetubo no Saibansho, where he is alleged to have "ensured judges who issued rulings or published academic papers running counter to his leadership policies were denied promotion and banished to rural areas. As a result, terrified judges learned to kowtow to their superiors and shy away from handing down nonconforming rulings."

Takesaki was replaced by Itsurō Terada as the new Chief Justice on April 1, 2014, the date of Takesaki's retirement.
