= Akira Ojima =

Japanese judge

Akira Ojima (born September 1, 1958) is a Japanese jurist who has served as an associate Justice of the Supreme Court of Japan since 2022.

== Education and career ==
Ojima was born on September 1, 1958, in Japan. He was raised in Fujisawa, Kanagawa Prefecture, and went to Eiko Gakuen in Kamakura. He attended the University of Tokyo and graduated with a degree in law in 1983. He earned a Master of Laws (LL.M.) degree from the Cornell University Law School in 1990. After this, he served as a judge in various lower courts in Japan until his appointment to the Supreme Court in 2022.

== Supreme Court ==
On July 5, 2022, Ojima was appointed to the Supreme Court of Japan. In Japan, justices are formally nominated by the Emperor (at that time, Naruhito) but in reality the Cabinet selects the nominees and the Emperor's role is a formality.

Ojima's term is scheduled to end on August 31, 2028 (one day before he turns 70). This is because all members of the court have a mandatory retirement age of 70.
