= General Insurance Rating Organization of Japan =

GIROJ
- General Insurance Rating Organization of Japan
- Songai Hoken Ryōritsu Sanshutu Kikō 損害保険料率算出機構
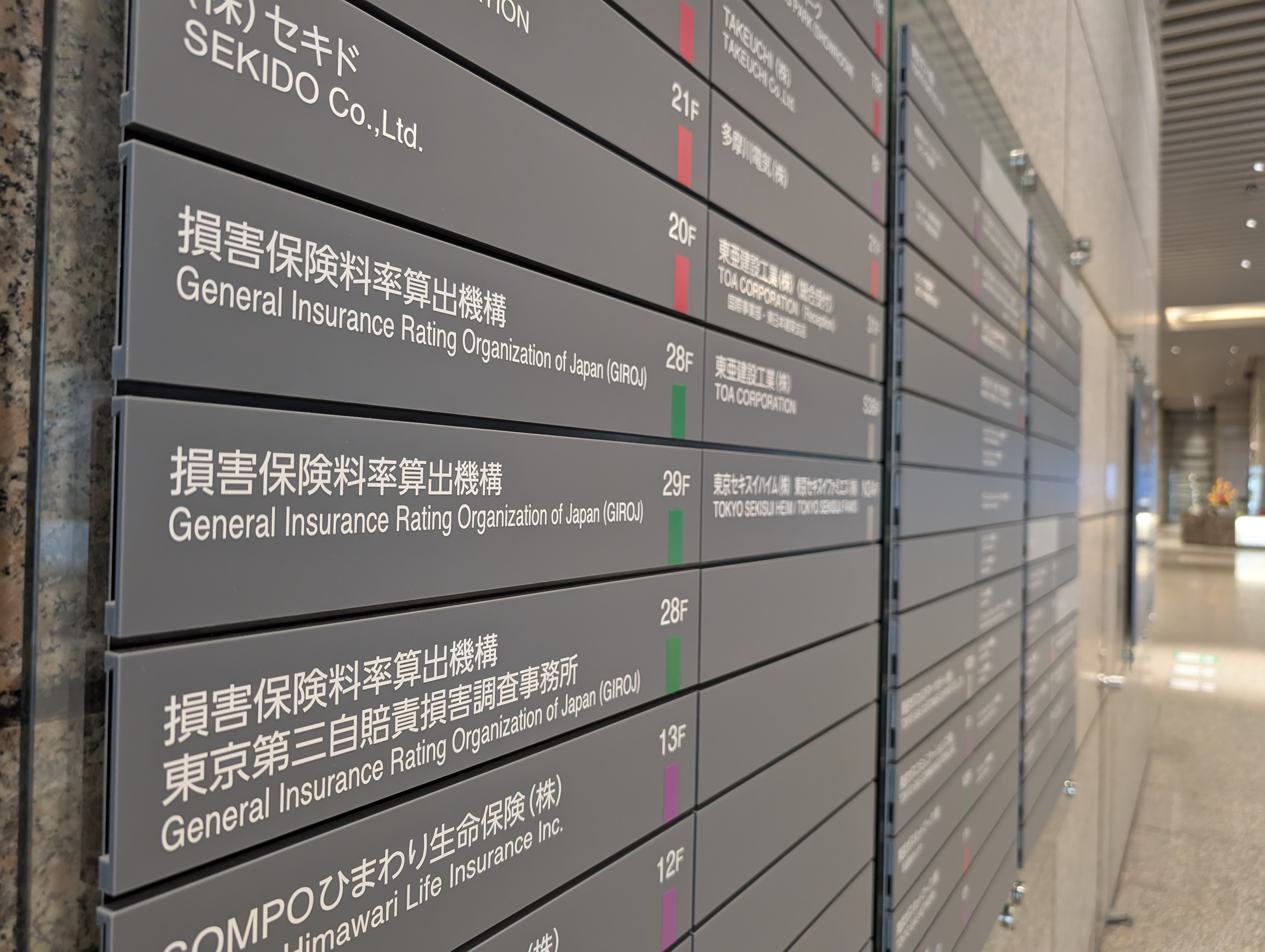
- Founder: Japan
- Founded at: Tokyo
- Tax ID no.: 9011105004991
- Headquarters: Shinjuku Park Tower, 3-7-1 Nishi-Shinjuku, Shinjuku-ku, Tokyo
- Location: 54 cities, Japan
- Coordinates: 35.68564°N 139.69095°E
- Revenue: $165,700 (2021)
- Expenses: $160,000 (2021)
- Staff: 1,975 (2023)
- Website: www.giroj.or.jp/english/

General Insurance Rating Organization of Japan (Japanese: Songai Hoken Ryōritsu Sanshutsu Kikō) is the only vehicle insurance premium rating organization in Japan.

== History ==
GIROJ is the private company established in 2002 on the basis of the Act on Non-Life Insurance Rating Organizations with the "aim of facilitating the development of the general insurance business and protecting the interests of policyholders, etc."

As of 2024, it includes 36 insurers or insurance-related organizations as its members.

== Services ==
GIROJ's business is to issue GTC of insurance contracts, to calculate and provide reference loss cost rates and standard full rates, and to conduct loss surveys for the compulsory automobile liability insurance (Jibaiseki songai baisho sekinin Hoken, 自動車損害賠償責任保険) as part of insurance rate calculation operations.

=== Premium rate calculation ===
GIROJ collects large amounts of insurance data from our member insurance companies, etc. and calculates appropriate reference loss cost rates and standard full rates based on highly accurate statistics for general insurance such as automobile, fire and personal accident insurance.

It acts as a database for member insurance companies by providing data and survey results. It also engages in international activities, deepening exchanges with foreign countries and conducting information exchange.

On the other hand, major Japanese insurance companies have rather large solvency ratios, such as Sony Assurance Inc.'s 730.8% in 2017 or Sompo Japan's 652.1% in 2022. As a result, the Financial Services Agency has cut the compulsory motor liability insurance premium in 2023.

GIROJ also calculates with the earthquake insurance premium rate.

=== Claim surveys ===
Member companies of GIROJ can ask the claim survey to 54 GIROJ local offices all over the nation and opponent can file opposition anytime within the statute of limitations. GIROJ conducts claim surveys with "fairness, promptness and kindness" as its motto and "strives to improve our operations based on users' opinions."

In 2007, the FSA found inappropriate non-payments of insurance claims in 21 companies. Within 10 of them, common serious problems were found in their insurance payment control systems, and the number of cases of inappropriate non-payment was as much as 3,585 cases ($7.2 million in amount)

== Organization ==
=== List of Chairperson ===
- Morishima Akio (森嶌昭夫, Jul. 2002 - Jun. 2014）
- Urakawa Michitarō (浦川道太郎, Jun. 2014 - 2022）
- Hayakawa Shinichirō (早川眞一郎, 2022–present）

== Investment ==
In 2021, GIROJ headoffice earned a profit of $5,626,000 from investment activities of $12 million.

== Publishing ==
- Automobile Insurance System In Japan. 2020.
- Overview of Standard Full Rates for Compulsory Automobile Liability Insurance. 2023.
- Automobile Insurance in Japan. 2023

== See also ==
- Fair Trade Commission (Japan)
- Actuary
- Foreign Non-Life Insurance Association of Japan
