= Tadahiko Mibuchi =

Japanese judge

Tadahiko Mibuchi (三淵 忠彦, Mibuchi Tadahiko; March 3, 1880 – July 14, 1950) was the first Chief Justice of Japan (1947–1950) and the father of Mibuchi Shinzaburō, a businessman who was in the insurance industry.

== Bibliography ==
- 山本祐司『最高裁物語（上・下）』（日本評論社、1994年）（講談社+α文庫、1997年）
- 佐野比呂己「教材「ろくをさばく」をめぐって」、『国語論集』第7巻、北海道教育大学 (:en:Hokkaido University of Education）釧路校国語科教育研究室、2010年3月、 NAID 110009444025。
- 佐野比呂己「教材「ろくをさばく」考(2)」、『北海道教育大学紀要. 教育科学編』第60巻第1号、北海道教育大学、2009年8月、 NAID 110007224817。
- 佐野比呂己「教材「ろくをさばく」考(3)」、『釧路論集 : 北海道教育大学釧路分校研究報告』第41号、北海道教育大学、2009年12月、 ISSN 0287-8216、 NAID 110008767341。
- 佐野比呂己「教材「ろくをさばく」考(4)」、『釧路論集 : 北海道教育大学釧路分校研究報告』第41巻、北海道教育大学、2010年2月、 ISSN 0287-8216、 NAID 110008428846。
- 佐野比呂己「教材「ろくをさばく」考(5)」、『北海道教育大学紀要. 教育科学編』第61巻第1号、北海道教育大学、2010年10月、 NAID 110008428896。

Preceded by New office	Chief Justice of Japan; 1947–1950	Succeeded by Kōtarō Tanaka
