= Ryuko Sakurai =

Japanese judge

Ryuko Sakurai (桜井 龍子, Sakurai Ryūko; born January 16, 1947) was a member of the Supreme Court of Japan. She joined on September 11, 2008.

Sakurai, a former bureaucrat of the Ministry of Labor, replaced Kazuko Yokoo, who resigned. She was the third woman to take a post in the Supreme Court of Japan.
