= Kazumi Okamura =

Japanese jurist

The Honourable Kazumi Okamura

Associate Justice of the Supreme Court of Japan
- Incumbent
- Assumed office October 2, 2019
- Appointed by: Emperor Naruhito

Personal details
- Born: December 23, 1957 (age 68) Japan
- Education: Waseda University; Harvard Law School

Kazumi Okamura (born December 23, 1957) is a Japanese jurist who has served as an associate justice of the Supreme Court of Japan since 2019.

== Education and career ==
Okamura was born in Tokyo. She attended Waseda University and graduated with a degree in law in 1980. She was appointed as a legal apprentice in 1981, and admitted to the bar in 1983, starting her career at the law firm of Nagashima Ohno.

She earned a LL.M (Master of Laws) in 1988 from Harvard Law School, and joined Morgan Stanley in 1990, serving as the head of its legal department in Japan from 1997 to 2000.

She served as a public prosecutor from 2000 to 2016, when she was appointed to head the Consumer Affairs Agency.

== Supreme Court ==
On October 2, 2019, Okamura was appointed to the Supreme Court of Japan. In Japan, justices are formally nominated by the Emperor (at that time, Naruhito) but in reality the Cabinet chooses the nominees and the Emperor's role is a formality.

Okamura's term is scheduled to end on December 22, 2027, one day before she reaches the mandatory retirement age of 70.
