= Eriko Watanabe =

Japanese jurist

Eriko Watanabe (born December 27, 1958) is a Japanese jurist who has served as an associate Justice of the Supreme Court of Japan since 2021.

== Education and career ==
Watanabe was born on December 27, 1958, in Japan. She attended Tohoku University and graduated with a degree in law in 1983. She began working as an attorney but continued her studies, earning a Master of Laws degree (LL.M.) from the University of Washington in 1994. Before her appointment to the Supreme Court, she worked as a law professor and Auditor of the NHK.

== Supreme Court ==
On July 16, 2021, Watanabe was appointed to the Supreme Court of Japan. In Japan, justices are formally nominated by the Emperor (at that time, Naruhito) but in reality the Cabinet selects the nominees and the Emperor's role is a formality.

Watanabe's term is scheduled to end on December 26, 2028 (one day before her 70th birthday). This is because all members of the court have a mandatory retirement age of 70.
