= Niro Shimada =

Niro Shimada (島田 仁郎, Shimada Nirō, born November 22, 1938) was the Chief Justice of the Supreme Court of Japan.

Born in Tokyo, he attended the University of Tokyo, graduating with an LL.B. and passing the bar examination in 1962. He was appointed as an assistant judge in 1964 and rotated through the criminal divisions of the Tokyo and Nagoya District Courts and of the Supreme Court. He obtained an MPhil from the University of London in 1968.

He served on the Osaka District Court (1974–77), as a lecturer at the Legal Research and Training Institute (1977–81), on the Tokyo District Court (1981–82; 1986–89), in the criminal division of the Supreme Court (1983–86; 1989–94), as chief judge of the Utsunomiya District Court (1994–96), as chief judge of the Urawa District Court (1996–98), as head of the Legal Research and Training Institute (1999–2001), as chief judge of the Sendai High Court (2001–02) and as chief judge of the Osaka High Court (2002). He was appointed to the Supreme Court on November 7, 2002, and became Chief Justice on October 16, 2006.

Hironobu Takesaki replaced Niro Shimada when November 21, 2008, the date of Shimada's mandatory retirement, came.
