= Michiharu Hayashi =

Japanese jurist (born 1957)

Michiharu Hayashi (Hayashi Michiharu; born August 31, 1957) is a Japanese jurist who has served as an associate Justice of the Supreme Court of Japan since 2019.

== Education and career ==
Hayashi was born on August 31, 1957, in Japan. He attended the University of Tokyo and graduated with a degree in law in 1980. Hayashi served on lower courts and as a professor for over 35 years, from 1982 to his appointment to the highest court in 2019.

Hayashi served as a law apprentice from his graduation in 1980 until 1982. From 1982 to 1992, he served in several offices, including the Civil affairs Bureau, the Private Pension Division, and the Pension Bureau of the Ministry of Health and Welfare (reorganized into the Ministry of Health, Labour and Welfare in 2001). In 1992, Hayashi joined the Tokyo District Court, and kept that position until 2002. He served concurrently in the Civil Affairs Bureau of the Supreme Court from 1993 to 2002. In 2002, he was appointed to the Tokyo High Court, but in 2003 he returned to the District Court as the presiding judge. In 2013 he was moved to the Shizuoka District Court where he also served as the Presiding Justice. In 2014 he was moved back to the Tokyo High Court where he was the Presiding Justice, and kept this post until 2019.

== Supreme Court ==
On September 2, 2019, Hayashi was appointed to the Supreme Court of Japan. In Japan, justices are formally nominated by the Emperor (at that time, Naruhito) but in reality the Cabinet chooses the nominees and the Emperor's role is a formality.

Hayashi's term is scheduled to end on August 30, 2027 (one day before he turns 70). This is because all members of the court have a mandatory retirement age of 70.
