= Toru Sakai =

Japanese jurist

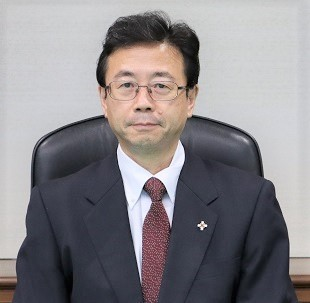
Sakai in 2020

Toru Sakai (born July 17, 1958) is a Japanese jurist who has served as an associate Justice of the Supreme Court of Japan since 2021.

== Education and career ==
Sakai was born on July 17, 1958, in Japan. He attended the University of Tokyo and graduated with a degree in law in 1982. Before his appointment to the Supreme Court, he served as a prosecutor in Tokyo and Osaka, among other places.

== Supreme Court ==
On September 3, 2021, Sakai was appointed to the Supreme Court of Japan. In Japan, justices are formally nominated by the Emperor (at that time, Naruhito) but in reality the Cabinet selects the nominees and the Emperor's role is a formality.

Sakai's term is scheduled to end on July 16, 2028 (one day before his seventieth birthday). This is because all members of the court have a mandatory retirement age of 70.
