= Toyozo Ueda =

Toyozo Ueda (上田 豊三, Ueda Toyozō; born May 23, 1937) was a former justice on the Supreme Court of Japan. In spring 2009, Ueda was awarded the highest decoration of Japan, the Grand Cordon of the Order of the Rising Sun. Before being appointed to the Supreme Court in 2002, he headed the courts in Osaka and in Hiroshima and served as a judge in Tokyo and Maebashi.
