= Norio Wakui =

Japanese judge

Norio Wakui (涌井 紀夫, Wakui Norio) (February 11, 1942-December 17, 2009
