= Koichi Yaguchi =

Koichi Yaguchi (矢口 洪一, Yaguchi Kōichi, February 20, 1920 – July 25, 2006) was the 11th Chief Justice of Japan (1985–1990). He was graduate of Kyoto University. He was a recipient of the Order of the Rising Sun with Paulownia flowers.

Preceded by Osamu Terada	Chief Justice of Japan; 1985–1990	Succeeded by Ryohachi Kusaba

== Honours ==
- Junior Second Rank (July 25, 2006; posthumous)

== Bibliography ==
- 朝日新聞「孤高の王国」取材班『孤高の王国裁判所』（朝日文庫、1994年）ISBN 4-02-261058-1 、単行本（朝日新聞社、1991年）
- 山本祐司『最高裁物語（上・下）』（日本評論社、1994年）（講談社+α文庫、1997年） ISBN 4-06-256192-1 ISBN 4-06-256193-X
