= Yukihiko Imasaki =

Japanese jurist (born 1957)

The Honourable Yukihiko Imasaki
- 今崎 幸彦
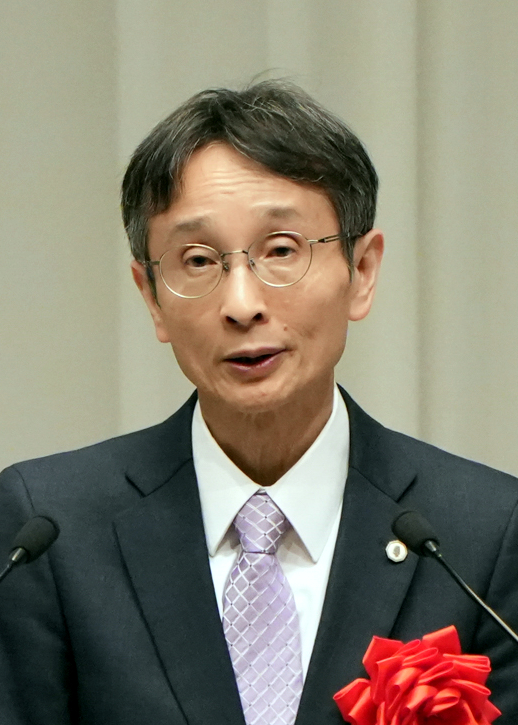
- Image of Yukihiko Imasaki

21st Chief Justice of Japan
- Incumbent
- Assumed office August 16, 2024
- Appointed by: Emperor Naruhito
- Preceded by: Saburo Tokura

Supreme Court Justice
- Incumbent
- Assumed office June 24, 2022
- Appointed by: Second Kishida cabinet

Personal details
- Born: November 10, 1957 (age 68) Kobe, Hyogo Prefecture, Japan
- Education: Kyoto University

Yukihiko Imasaki (今崎 幸彦, Imasaki Yukihiko; born November 10, 1957) is a Japanese jurist. He has served as the Chief Justice of the Supreme Court of Japan since August 16, 2024.

Previously, Imasaki served as Chief Justice of both the Mito and Tokyo District Courts. He was appointed to the Supreme Court on June 24, 2022.

== Education and career ==
Yukihiko Imasaki was born in 1957 in Kobe, Hyogo Prefecture. He attended Kyoto University and graduated with a degree in law in 1981.

== Supreme Court ==
On June 24, 2022, Imasaki was appointed to the Supreme Court of Japan.

In 2023, Imasaki presided over a Supreme Court ruling declaring illegal the toilet use restrictions imposed on a transgender official at the Ministry of Economy, Trade and Industry.

After Chief Justice Saburo Tokura reached the mandatory retirement age of 70, Imasaki was appointed Chief Justice.
