= Takaaki Hattori =

9th Chief Justice of Japan

Takaaki Hattori (Japanese: 服部高顯; October 1, 1912 – March 24, 1993) was the 9th Chief Justice of Japan (1979–1982). He was a graduate of the University of Tokyo. He was a recipient of the Order of the Rising Sun.

Preceded by Masao Okahara	Chief Justice of Japan; 1979–1982	Succeeded by Osamu Terada

== Bibliography ==
- 山本祐司『最高裁物語（上）』（日本評論社、1994年）（講談社+α文庫、1997年）ISBN 4-06-256192-1
- 山本祐司『最高裁物語（下）』（日本評論社、1994年）（講談社+α文庫、1997年）ISBN 4-06-256193-X
