= Imperial Investiture =

Japanese inauguration ceremony

The Imperial Investiture (親任式, Shinninshiki) is an official inauguration ceremony whereby the Emperor of Japan formally appoints the Prime Minister of Japan or the Chief Justice of Japan to office. In practice, the Prime Minister is nominated by the Diet, while the Chief Justice is nominated by the Cabinet. The Emperor is constitutionally required to appoint the nominated person, without the right to decline appointment.

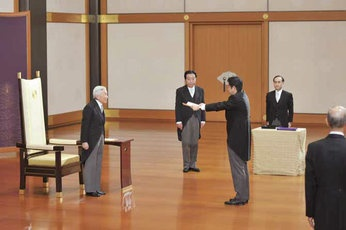
Emperor Akihito appoints Shinzō Abe as the Prime Minister at the Imperial Palace in Chiyoda Ward, Tōkyō Metropolis on 26 December 2012. Yoshihiko Noda, outgoing Prime Minister, watches on.

During the time period of the Empire of Japan, as the Emperor was the source of executive authority, there were also investitures held for military officials, the governors-general of the Japanese colonies (Chōsen and Taiwan), and (since 1943) the governor of Tokyo Metropolis. Such appointees were called the Shinninkan (親任官).

== Ceremony ==
The investiture ceremony is held in the Matsu-no-Ma room (松の間) of the Tokyo Imperial Palace. Several officials are present to witness the entire ceremony.

The ceremony first starts with the Prime Minister nominee formally greeting the Emperor upon entering the room. The Emperor greets back upon their approach and addresses that he or she is about to be appointed to office. The Prime Minister nominee acknowledges the Emperor by bowing and then turning to their side to receive their letter of appointment from the outgoing Prime Minister (or the current Prime Minister in the case of the appointment of the Chief Justice) containing the Emperor's Privy Seal and signature. The Prime Minister nominee turns back to face the Emperor, bowing and receding, before making their way to the entrance and then bowing again before leaving the room. The Emperor then leaves the room followed by the other officials.

For the appointment of the Prime Minister, both the Speaker of the House of Representatives and the President of the House of Councillors are present. If the current Prime Minister is re-appointed, then a Minister of State (usually the Deputy Prime Minister) will take over the role as the former Prime Minister in the investiture ceremony.

A similar ceremony called the Imperial Attestation (認証官任命式, Ninshōkan-ninmei-shiki) is held for the appointment of the Ministers of State, court judges and other officials. Although they are formally appointed by the Prime Minister, the Constitution stipulates that the ceremony must be attested by the Emperor.
