= Legal Training and Research Institute =

Japanese research organization

- 司法研修所
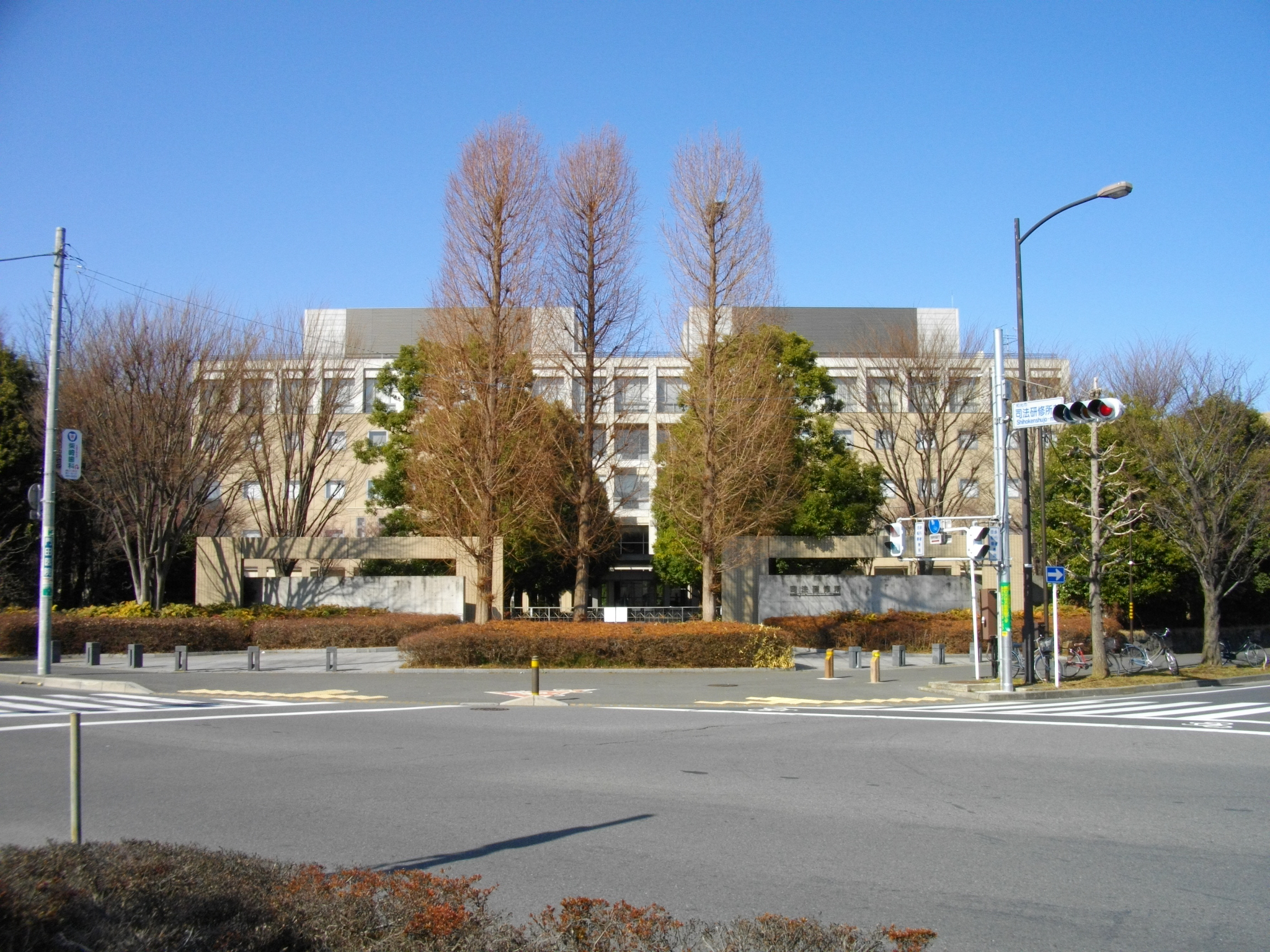
- Type: Governmental organization
- Headquarters: Wako, Saitama, Japan
- Coordinates: 35°46′24.6″N 139°36′2.2″E
- Key people: Hirotsugu Koizumi (Director)

The Legal Training and Research Institute (司法研修所 Shihō-kenshū-jo) is operated by the Supreme Court of Japan for the purposes of judicial research and training of new attorneys, prosecutors and judges. It is located in the city of Wako, Saitama, northwest of Tokyo.

== Overview ==
LTRI is an ancillary organization of the Supreme Court and consists of two divisions: a First Division that conducts research, and a Second Division that conducts training of new attorneys, prosecutors and judges. LRTI's facility in Wako includes three main buildings and two dormitory buildings for judges and trainees respectively.

All prospective attorneys, prosecutors and judges in Japan are required to undergo paid full-time training at LTRI (司法修習 shihō-shūshū) after passing the bar examination. The training period was two years prior to 1998, and is currently either 12 months (for law school graduates who have passed the "new" bar examination), or 16 months (for those who have passed the "old" bar examination which does not require a law school degree).

LTRI training was limited to Japanese nationals until 1977, and thereafter foreign nationals were only allowed to enroll with special permission from the Supreme Court; however, these nationality restrictions were lifted in 2009.
