= Cabinet of Japan =

Executive branch of the Government of Japan

- 日本の内閣; Nihon no Naikaku
- The Government crest of Japan

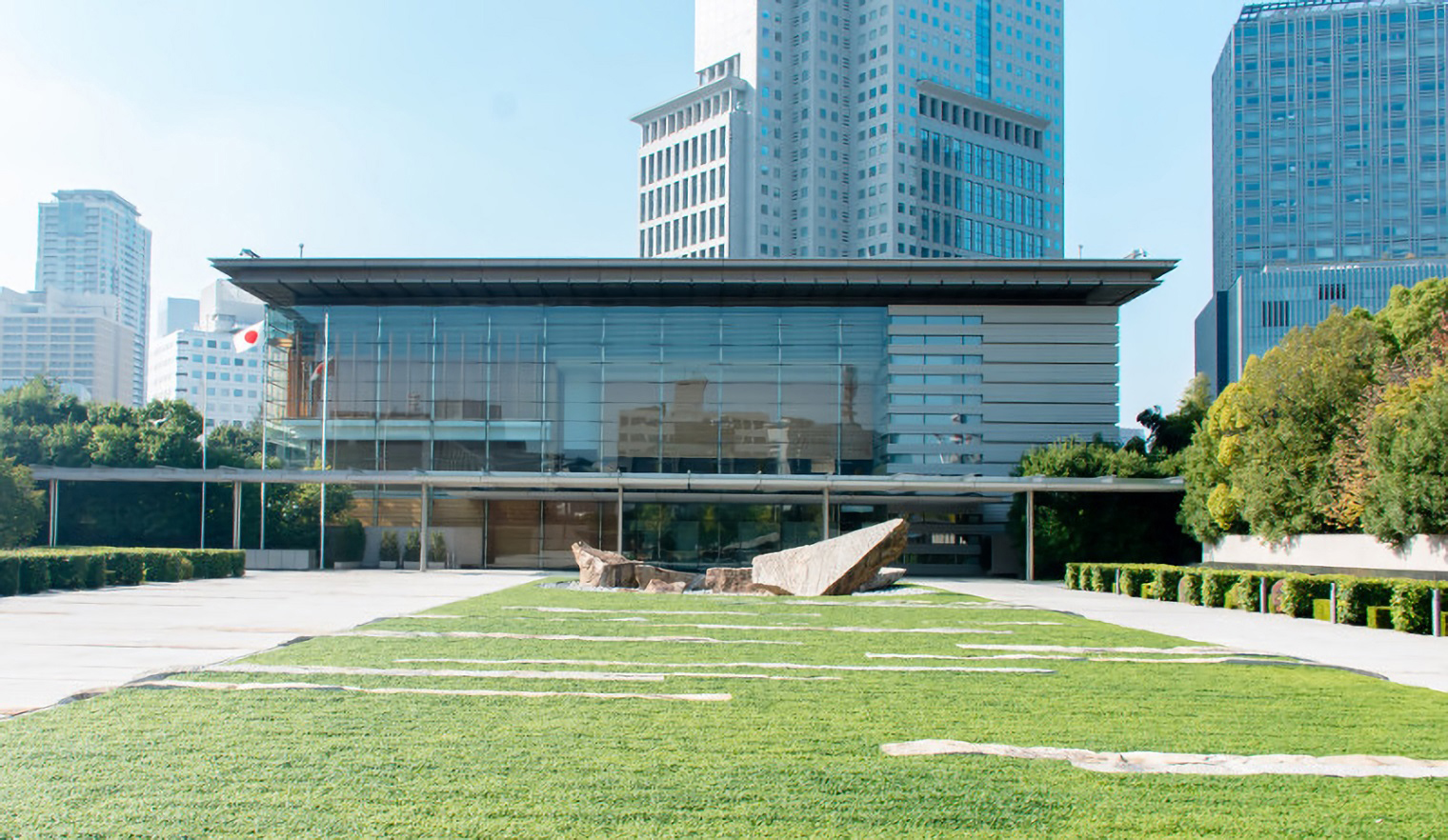
- Naikaku Sōri Daijin Kantei (Prime Minister's Office of Japan)

Agency overview
- Formed: 22 December 1885; 140 years ago
- Preceding agency: Daijō-kan
- Jurisdiction: Government of Japan
- Headquarters: Chiyoda, Tokyo, Japan
- Agency executive: Sanae Takaichi, Prime Minister of Japan
- Child agencies: Naikaku Sōri Daijin Kantei (Prime Minister's Office); Cabinet Office; Ministries of Japan
- Website: japan.kantei.go.jp

The Cabinet of Japan (内閣, Naikaku; [naꜜi.ka.kɯ]) is the chief executive body of the government of Japan. It consists of the prime minister, who is appointed by the Emperor after being nominated by the National Diet, in addition to up to seventeen other members, called ministers of state. The current cabinet, the Second Takaichi cabinet, was formed on 18 February 2026 and is led by Prime Minister Sanae Takaichi. The country has had a Liberal Democratic Party-led majority government since 2026.

The prime minister is nominated by the National Diet, while the remaining ministers are appointed and dismissed by the prime minister. The Cabinet is collectively responsible to the National Diet and must resign if a motion of no confidence is adopted by the National Diet.

== Appointment ==
Under the Constitution of Japan, Cabinet ministers are appointed after the selection of the prime minister. A majority of the Cabinet, including the prime minister, must be members of the National Diet, and all members must be civilians. Under the Cabinet Law, the number of Cabinet ministers (excluding the prime minister) must be fourteen or less, but this may be increased to seventeen if a special need arises. If the Cabinet collectively resigns, it continues to exercise its functions until the appointment of a new prime minister. While they are in office, legal action may not be taken against Cabinet ministers without the consent of the prime minister. The Cabinet must resign en masse in the following circumstances:

- When a motion of no confidence is adopted, or a vote of confidence defeated, by the House of Representatives, unless there is a dissolution of the house within ten days.
- Upon the first convocation of the National Diet after a general election to the House of Representatives (even if the same prime minister is to be re-elected and appointed, and every other minister is to be reappointed).
- When the position of prime minister becomes vacant, or the prime minister declares his intention to resign.

== Powers ==
The Cabinet exercises two kinds of power. Some of its powers are nominally exercised by the Emperor with the binding "advice and approval" of the Cabinet. Other powers are explicitly vested in the Cabinet. Contrary to the practice in many constitutional monarchies, the Emperor is not even the nominal chief executive. Instead, the Constitution explicitly vests executive authority in the Cabinet. Hence, nearly all of the day-to-day work of governing is done by the Cabinet.

In practice, much of the Cabinet's authority is exercised by the prime minister. Under the Constitution, the prime minister exercises "control and supervision" over the executive branch, and no law or Cabinet order can take effect without the prime minister's countersignature (and the emperor's promulgation). While Cabinet Ministers in most other parliamentary democracies theoretically have some freedom of action (within the limits of cabinet collective responsibility), the Japanese Cabinet is effectively an extension of the prime minister's authority.

According to Article 75 of the Constitution, Ministers of State are not subject to legal action without the consent of the prime minister during their tenure of office.

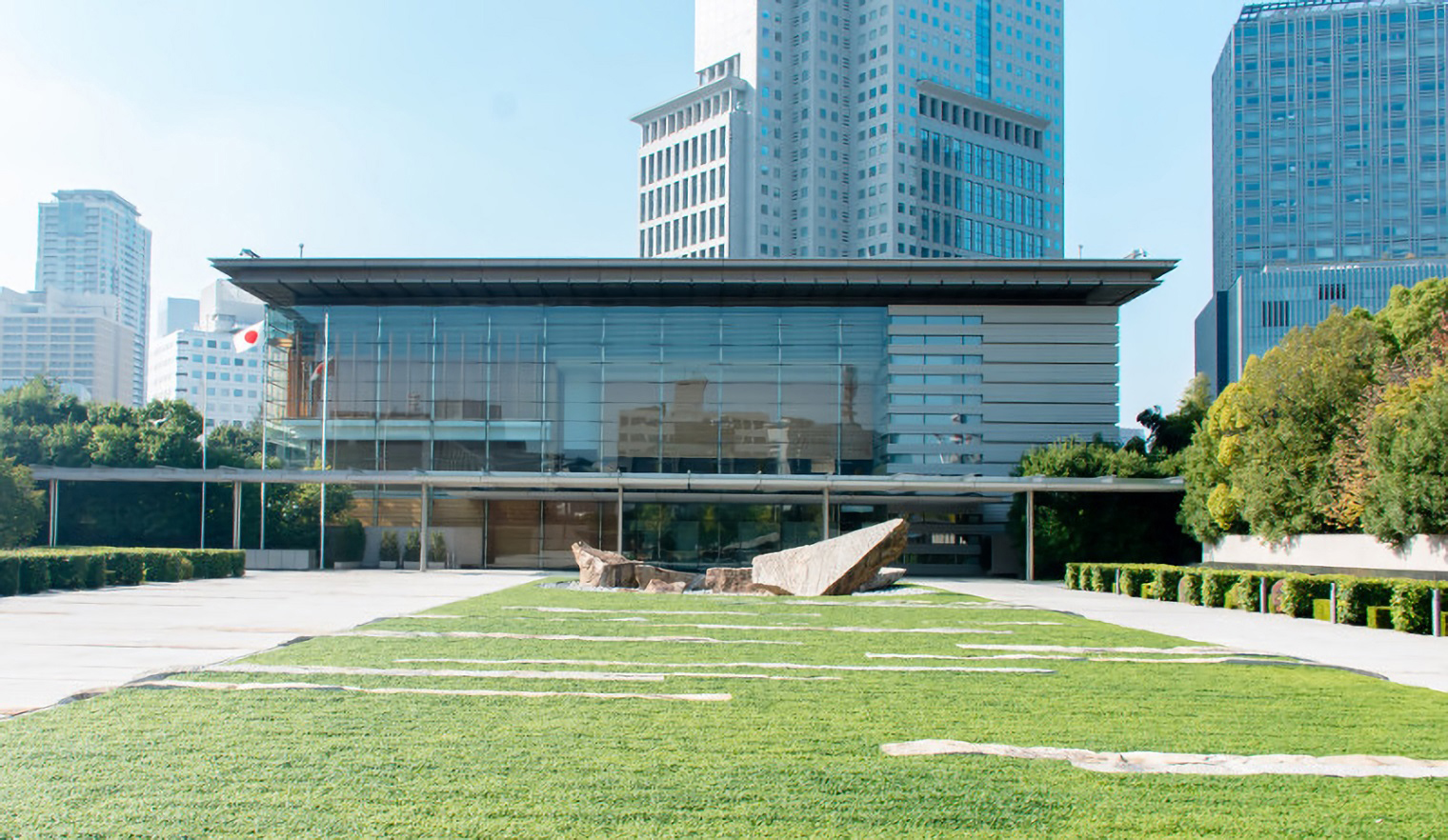
The Naikaku Sōri Daijin Kantei (Prime Minister's Office) is where the Cabinet is located.

The 5–7 paulownia commonly used as the symbol of the prime minister, cabinet, as well as the government at large.

The seal of the Cabinet

=== Powers exercised via the Emperor ===
- Promulgation of amendment of the constitution, laws, cabinet orders, and treaties
- Convocation of the National Diet
- Dissolution of the House of Representatives
- Proclamation of general elections to the National Diet
- Receiving of foreign ambassadors and ministers
- Conferring of honours

=== Explicit powers ===
- Execution of the law
- Conduct of foreign affairs
- Conclusion of treaties (with the consent of the National Diet).
- Administration of the civil service
- Drafting of the budget (which must be adopted by the National Diet)
- Adoption of cabinet orders
- Granting of general amnesty, special amnesty, commutation of punishment, reprieve, and restoration of rights
- Signing of laws or cabinet orders by the relevant Minister of State and countersigned by the Prime Minister
- Appointment of the associate justices of the Supreme Court of Japan (except for the Chief Justice, who is nominated by the Prime Minister and formally appointed by the Emperor)
- Appointment of vice-ministers (who are nominated by their respective minister to whom they will report)

== Current Cabinet ==
The current cabinet is led by Prime Minister Sanae Takaichi and succeeded the Second Takaichi cabinet. This is Takaichi's first reshuffled cabinet during her premiership.

As of 19 November 2026, the makeup of the Cabinet is as follows:

Parties
Liberal Democratic
Japan Innovation

Minister	Office(s)	Department	Start
Sanae Takaichi; MR for Nara 2nd	Prime Minister	Cabinet Office	21 October 2025
Hisayuki Fujii; MR for Hyōgo 4th	Minister for Internal Affairs and Communications; Minister of State for Regional Revitalization; Minister in charge of Strategy for the Future of Regions	Ministry of Internal Affairs and Communications	17 September 2026
Takashi Yamashita; MR for Okayama 2nd	Minister of Justice; Minister of State for Gender Equality; Minister in charge of Women's Empowerment; Minister in Charge of Verification and Reform of the Legal System	Ministry of Justice	17 September 2026
Toshimitsu Motegi; MR for Tochigi 5th	Minister for Foreign Affairs	Ministry of Foreign Affairs	21 October 2025
Satsuki Katayama; MC for National PR	Minister of Finance; Minister of State for Financial Services; Minister in charge of Reviewing Special Measures Concerning Taxation and Subsidies	Ministry of Finance; Financial Services Agency	21 October 2025
Yoshihiro Seki; MR for Hyōgo 3rd	Minister of Education, Culture, Sports, Science and Technology	Ministry of Education, Culture, Sports, Science and Technology	17 September 2026
Kenichiro Ueno; MR for Shiga 2nd	Minister of Health, Labour and Welfare	Ministry of Health, Labour and Welfare	21 October 2025
Arata Takebe; MR for Hokkaido 12th	Minister of Agriculture, Forestry and Fisheries	Ministry of Agriculture, Forestry and Fisheries	15 October 2026
Ryosei Akazawa; MR for Tottori 2nd	Minister of Economy, Trade and Industry; Minister in charge of the Response to the Economic Impact Caused by the Nuclear Accident; Minister in charge of Green Transformation; Minister in charge of Industrial Competitiveness; Minister in charge of Securing the Stability of Critical Goods in Response to the Situation in the Middle East; Minister of State for the Nuclear Damage Compensation and Decommissioning Facilitation Corporation	Ministry of Economy, Trade and Industry; Cabinet Office	21 October 2025
Tatsunori Ibayashi; MR for Shizuoka 2nd	Minister of Land, Infrastructure, Transport and Tourism; Minister in charge of Water Cycle Policy; Minister in charge of the World Horticultural Exhibition Yokohama 2027	Ministry of Land, Infrastructure, Transport and Tourism	17 September 2026
Hiroyoshi Sasagawa; MR for Gunma 3rd	Minister of the Environment; Minister of State for Nuclear Emergency Preparedness; Minister in Charge of Measures Against Bear-Related Damage	Ministry of the Environment; Cabinet Office	17 September 2026
Shinjirō Koizumi; MR for Kanagawa 11th	Minister of Defense	Ministry of Defense	21 October 2025
Minoru Kihara; MR for Kumamoto 1st	Chief Cabinet Secretary; Minister in charge of Mitigating the Impact of U.S. Forces in Okinawa; Minister in charge of the Abduction Issue	Cabinet Office	21 October 2025
Toshiharu Furukawa; MC for Saitama at-large	Minister for Digital Transformation; Minister in charge of Cybersecurity; Minister of State for Intellectual Property Strategy; Minister of State for Science and Technology Policy; Minister of State for Space Policy; Minister of State for Artificial Intelligence Strategy; Minister of State for Ocean Policy	Digital Agency; Cabinet Office	17 September 2026
Goshi Hosono; MR for Shizuoka 5th	Minister for Reconstruction; Minister for Disaster Management; Minister in charge of Comprehensive Policy Coordination for Revival from the Nuclear Accident at Fukushima; Minister in charge of Building National Resilience; Minister for International Disaster Risk Reduction Cooperation	Reconstruction Agency; National Disaster Management Agency	17 September 2026
Yasuhiro Hanashi; MR for Ibaraki 3rd	Chairperson of the National Public Safety Commission; Minister in charge of Territorial Issues; Minister of State for Okinawa and Northern Territories Affairs; Minister of State for Consumer Affairs and Food Safety; Minister of State for Ainu-Related Policies	National Public Safety Commission; Cabinet Office	17 September 2026
Hiroshi Nakatsuka; MR for Osaka 11th	Minister of State for Consumer Affairs and Food Safety; Minister of State for Policies Related to Children, Declining Birthrate, and Youth Empowerment; Minister of State for Promoting Cohesive and Mutual Assistance Society; Minister in charge of Administrative Reform; Minister in charge of the National Civil Service System Reform; Minister for Regulatory Reform	Cabinet Office	17 September 2026
Minoru Kiuchi; MR for Shizuoka 7th	Minister in Charge of Japan's Growth Strategy; Minister in charge of Developing an Environment for Wage Increases; Minister in charge of Startups; Minister in charge of Social Security Reform Oriented to All Generations; Minister of State for Economic and Fiscal Policy	Cabinet Office	21 October 2025
Kimi Onoda; MC for Okayama at-large	Minister in charge of Economic Security; Minister in charge of Infectious Disease Crisis Management; Minister in charge of a Society of Well-Ordered and Harmonious Coexistence with Foreign Nationals; Minister of State for Economic Security	Cabinet Office	21 October 2025

== See also ==
- Cabinet Office
- List of female cabinet ministers of Japan
- Naikaku Sōri Daijin Kantei (Prime Minister's Office of Japan)
- Politics of Japan

== General and cited references ==
- "Cabinet Profiles" [since 2008]. The Japan Times. Accessed 13 October 2012.
- Cabinet Secretariat, Office of Cabinet Public Relations, Japan (2003) prime minister of Japan and His Cabinet. Retrieved 28 Oct. 2003
- Hunter, Janet (1984). Concise Dictionary of Modern Japanese History. Berkeley and Los Angeles: University of California Press, pp. 266–324, Appendix 5: Japanese Cabinets Since the Introduction of the Cabinet System in 1885 [to 1980].
