= Supreme Court of Japan =

Highest court of Japan

Supreme Court
- 最高裁判所
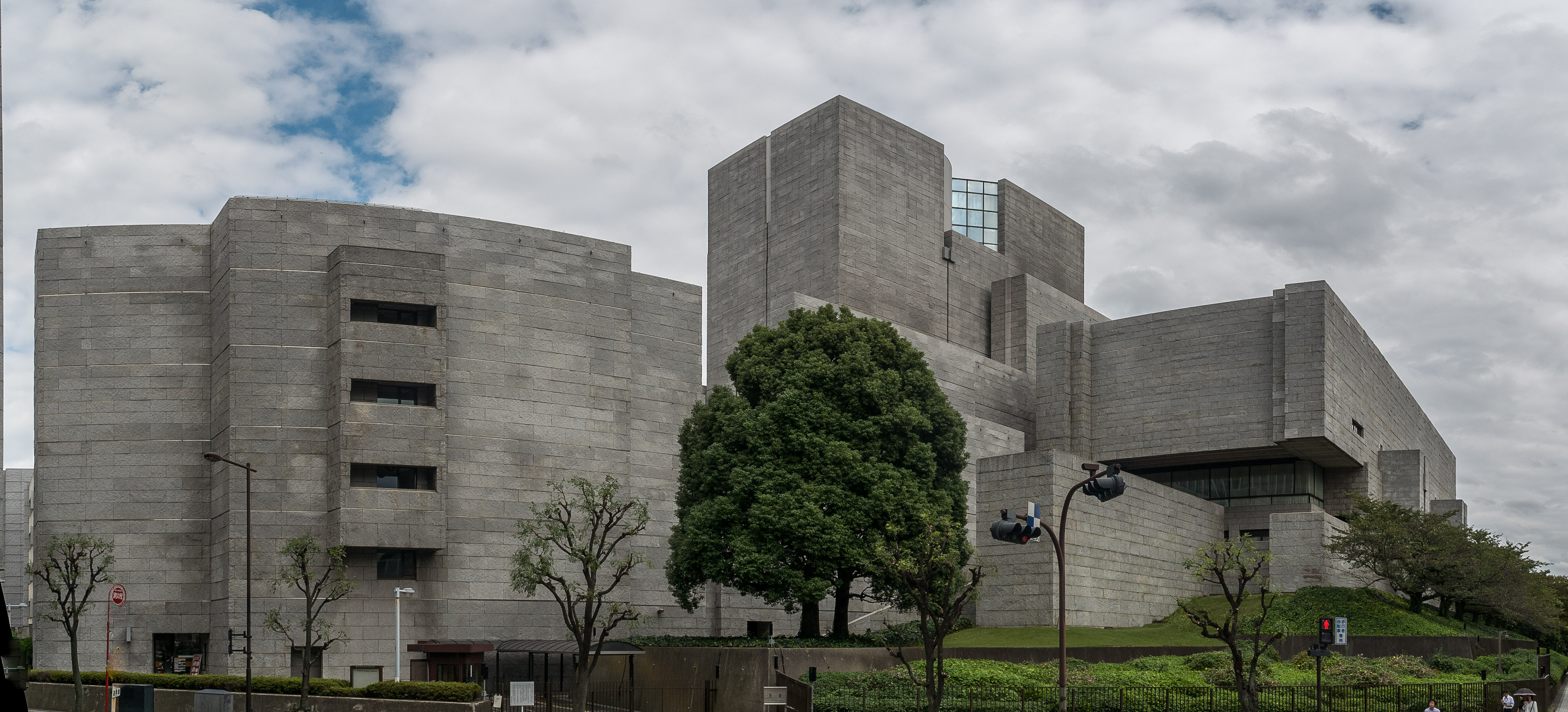
- Supreme Court building
- Interactive map of Supreme Court
- 35°40′49″N 139°44′37″E
- Established: May 3, 1947
- Location: Chiyoda-ku, Tokyo
- Coordinates: 35°40′49″N 139°44′37″E
- Composition method: Selected by the Cabinet of Japan
- Authorised by: Constitution of Japan
- Judge term length: Mandatory retirement at age 70
- Website: Supreme Court

Chief Justice
- Currently: Yukihiko Imasaki
- Since: August 16, 2024

The Supreme Court of Japan (最高裁判所, Saikō-Saibansho; called 最高裁, Saikō-Sai for short), located in Hayabusachō, Chiyoda, Tokyo, is the highest court in Japan. It has ultimate judicial authority to interpret the Japanese constitution and decide questions of national law. It has the power of judicial review, which allows it to determine the constitutionality of any law or official act.

== History ==
The modern Supreme Court was established in Article 81 of the Constitution of Japan in 1947. There was some debate among the members of the SCAP legal officers who drafted the constitution and in the Imperial Diet meeting of 1946 over the extent of the power of the judiciary, but it was overshadowed by other major questions about popular sovereignty, the role of the emperor, and the renunciation of war. Although the ratified wording in Article 81 states that the court possesses the power of judicial review, a part of the court's early history involved clarifying the extent of this power. In 1948, the court declared that the constitution meant to establish the type of judicial review that was practiced in the United States. In 1952, the power, as the Court held, was clarified to apply only in cases with a concrete case.

In the 1960s and 1970s, the Supreme Court experienced a "judicial crisis" between older judges and generally younger, more liberal judges. For example, there was controversy when some judges in lower courts were seen as frustrating the implementation of ordinances that would limit anti-government demonstrations. In 1971, the Supreme Court deliberately did not reappoint assistant judge Yasauaki Miyamoto, who participated in a legal organization associated with left-wing ideological leanings. This "Miyamoto Affair" resulted in significant media coverage and protest by other judges. Since then, no judge has failed to be reappointed. Ultimately, the court was reshaped during the 1960s and 1970s to become more conservative, with more representation among the justices from lifetime government employees, which resulted in decisions that tended to limit free expression and public demonstration.

== Powers and responsibilities ==
Article 81 of the Constitution of Japan defines the Supreme Court as a court of last resort and allows it to conduct judicial review through "the power to determine the constitutionality of any law, order, regulation or official act". In its first role as a court of last resort, the Supreme Court hears civil, administrative, and criminal cases appealed from lower courts. This responsibility and the inability to apply discretion in the appeals it hears results in civil and criminal appeals being a significant majority of its caseload. In its second role, the Supreme Court can exercise its power of judicial review when a concrete legal dispute involving a violation or misinterpretation of the constitution is appealed.

The Supreme Court also manages the operation, budget, and personnel of all of Japan's courts. Decisions are made by a regular Conference of the Justices in the Supreme Court and implemented by the Administration Bureau of the Supreme Court. The Chief Justice of the Supreme Court, through the office of the General Secretariat, also has extensive control over judicial personnel, including judges. This includes the ability to determine posts of judges, which has a significant impact on their careers and advancement opportunities. The Supreme Court also oversees the Legal Research and Training Institute, which prospective legal professionals who have passed the National Bar Examination are required to attend to receive practical training.

== Use of judicial review ==
Although the Supreme Court has established the power to strike down legislation that is unconstitutional, it has used this power extremely infrequently. By a simple numerical count, the Supreme Court struck down only eight laws on constitutional grounds over a period of six decades, during which the German Federal Constitutional Court struck down over 600, the United States Supreme Court over 900, and the Indian Supreme Court over 2,600. Furthermore, in at least one case where a constitutional violation was found, regarding election district apportionment, the court has been unable to achieve compliance with its ruling.

Observers have proposed several possible reasons for this. One critical view is that the membership of the Supreme Court is influenced by the political dominance of the LDP, and therefore is less likely to challenge legislation produced by aligned politicians in the National Diet. There could also be the desire to maintain good relationships with judges in the Ministry of Justice or other departments. Another critical view is that the court functions like a bureaucracy, with a conservative leadership promoting like-minded judges that are less likely to make significant decisions. A historical perspective argues that the early judges were influenced by a Meiji Constitution and German jurisprudence tradition that did not allow striking down unconstitutional legislation, and that over time this expectation resulted in a reluctance to act in politically sensitive cases to maintain judicial independence.

One more favorable explanation is the role of the Cabinet Legislation Bureau in the legal ecosystem. The bureau is composed of senior bureaucrats and a minority of judges, some of whom go on to join the Supreme Court. It has the responsibility of thoroughly investigating government legislation to avoid constitutional flaws. Proponents of this view argue that this process prevents the need for the Supreme Court to frequently strike down legislation, as violations of the constitution are removed during the legislative phase.

== Composition ==
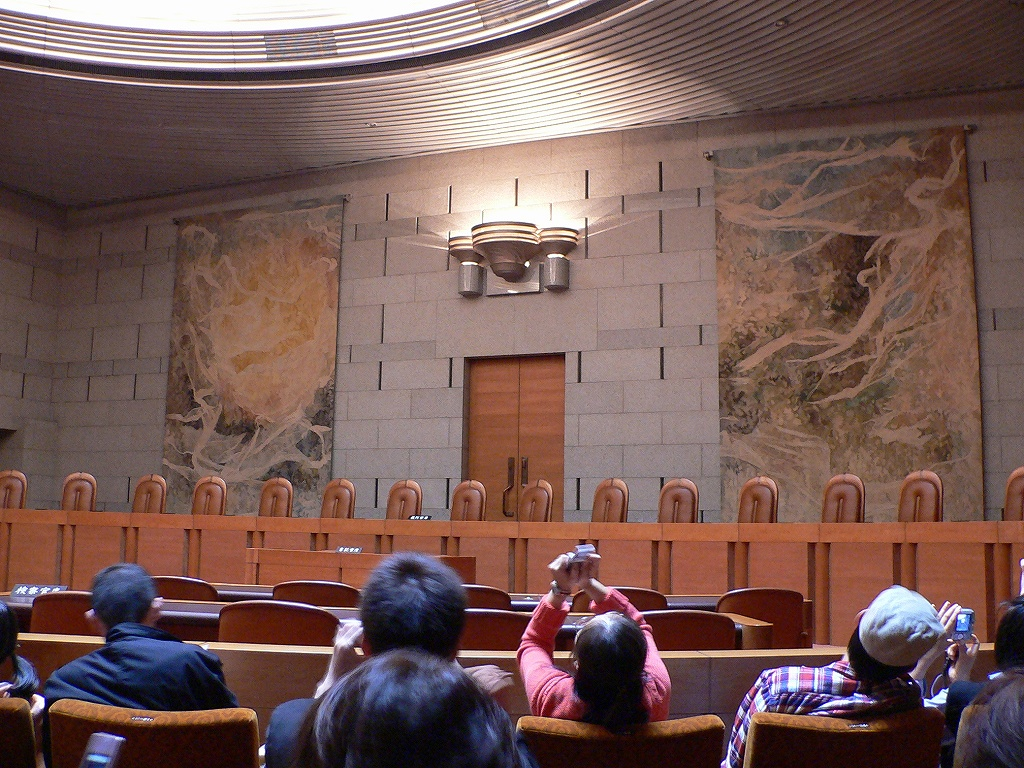
The Grand Bench

The composition of the Supreme Court is defined by the 1947 Judiciary Act. The Supreme Court is composed of a Chief Justice and 14 other Justices. These Justices are divided into three Petty Benches of five, which adjudicate most appeals. Questions of constitutional interpretation are adjudicated by the Grand Bench of all 15 Justices, of which nine are needed for a quorum.

Associate Justices of the Supreme Court are both selected and appointed by the Cabinet of Japan, but the Chief Justice differs in being appointed by the Emperor of Japan. Justices are required to be over the age of 40 and possess an extensive knowledge of the law. Unlike in other countries, Supreme Court judges in Japan are subject to retention elections, held concurrently with the first general election after their appointment. A judge is removed from office if a majority votes against them, but this has never happened. A public review is stipulated to occur every ten years after appointment, but since Justices are generally appointed at age 60 or older and must retire at age 70, there are effectively no second reviews.

Particular to the Supreme Court of Japan is the uncodified custom of having seats of the court be allocated to different legal professions: career judges, private attorneys, prosecutors, academics and bureaucrats. The numbers for each group have been subject to some variation, but overall have been remarkably stable since the court's inception.

== Building ==
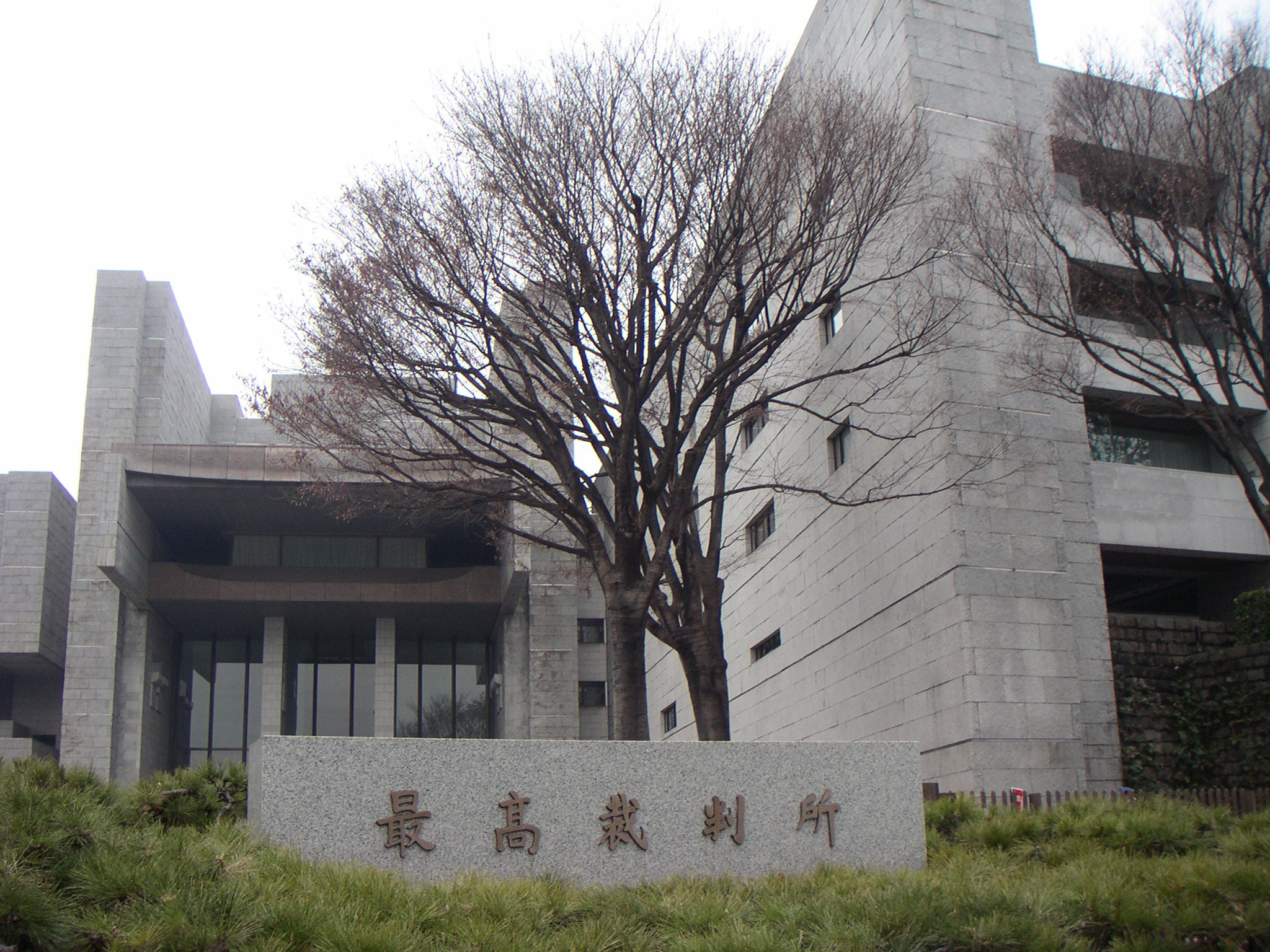
Façade of the Supreme Court building

The modern Supreme Court was first convened in May 1947 in the former Privy Council quarters of the Tokyo Imperial Palace. It moved to the Tokyo District Court building in September of that year. It was intended to occupy the building of the Supreme Court of Judicature, the previous highest court during the Imperial Japan era, but the building was largely destroyed in the war and had to be rebuilt. In October 1949, this reconstruction was completed and the Supreme Court of Japan would use the building for twenty-five years.

In 1964, a plan for a new Supreme Court building was created. It was decided that the building should be created in a modern style, and that the design be selected through a public contest. Of 217 submissions, one submitted through a joint effort of 17 people at Kajima led by architect Shinichi Okada was chosen. Construction began in 1971 and concluded in 1974. The new and now current Supreme Court building is located at 4-2 Hayabusa-cho, Chiyoda, Tokyo. It is of steel-reinforced concrete construction, and makes ample use of Japanese white granite, just as the previous Supreme Court building did. There are five floors above ground and two floors below ground.

== Justices ==
The current justices are:

Title	Name	Birth date	University	Background	Previous occupation
Chief Justice	Yukihiko Imasaki	November 10, 1957 (age 68)	Kyoto	Judge	President, Tokyo High Court
Justice	Masami Okino	January 12, 1964 (age 62)	Tokyo	Legal scholar	Dean, Graduate Schools for Law and Politics and Faculty of Law, University of Tokyo
Justice	Junichi Takasu	October 9, 1959 (age 67)	Hosei	Attorney	Dean, Graduate School of Law, Hosei University
Justice	Michiharu Hayashi	August 31, 1957 (age 69)	Tokyo	Judge	President, Tokyo High Court
Justice	Kazumi Okamura	December 23, 1957 (age 68)	Waseda	Attorney and Prosecutor	Commissioner, Consumer Affairs Agency
Justice	Ryōsuke Yasunami	April 19, 1957 (age 69)	Tokyo	Judge	President, Osaka High Court
Justice	Eriko Watanabe	December 27, 1958 (age 67)	Tohoku	Attorney	Auditor, Ochanomizu University
Justice	Toru Sakai	July 17, 1958 (age 68)	Tokyo	Prosecutor	Superintending Prosecutor, Tokyo High Public Prosecutors Office
Justice	Akira Ojima	September 1, 1958 (age 68)	Tokyo	Judge	President, Osaka High Court
Justice	Mitsuko Miyagawa	February 13, 1960 (age 66)	Tokyo	Attorney	Outside Director, Mitsubishi Motors
Justice	Kimihiro Ishikane	January 4, 1958 (age 68)	Tokyo	Diplomat	Ambassador, Permanent Mission to the United Nations
Justice	Masahiro Hiraki	April 3, 1961 (age 65)	Tokyo	Judge	Chief Judge, Osaka High Court
Justice	Makoto Nakamura	September 12, 1961 (age 65)	Kyoto	Judge	President, Tokyo High Court
Justice	Hirofumi Ata	May 14, 1960 (age 66)	Doshisha	Attorney	Chairman, Japan Federation of Bar Associations' Judicial System Research Committee
Justice	Hiroshi Yamamoto	October 12, 1963 (age 63)	Hitotsubashi	Prosecutor	Deputy Prosecutor-General, Supreme Public Prosecutors Office

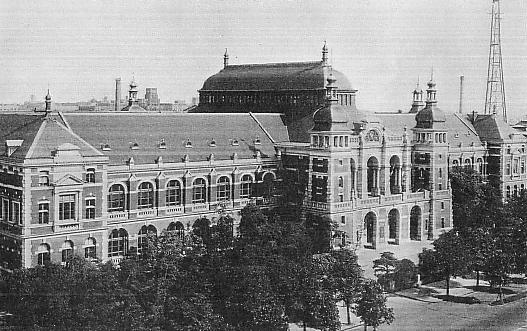
The Supreme Court building before the war

== See also ==
- Chief Justice of Japan
- Japanese law
- Judicial system of Japan
- List of justices of the Supreme Court of Japan
- Politics of Japan
