= Natsume Sōseki's kanshi =

Natsume Sōseki wrote many poems in Classical Chinese (kanshi) during his career. He began writing Chinese in school, and continued throughout his life, but became especially prolific just before his death. His kanshi are well-regarded critically – in fact considered the best of the Meiji period – but are not as popular as his novels.

== Beginnings ==
Natsume Sōseki first took up Chinese studies, specifically the composition of kanshi (poetry in Classical Chinese), in school.

== Later works ==
Sōseki considered himself an amateur kanshi poet, and ignored the practices of the professional poets of his day. He included some Chinese poetry in his early novel Kusamakura, and he had continued to compose them throughout his life, but his most significant works came from the last months of his life, during the writing of Light and Darkness. He also composed haiku during this period, but he is considered a minor haiku poet while his kanshi have been widely praised. While writing Light and Darkness, he wrote the novel in the morning and kanshi in the afternoon, supposedly to keep himself oriented during the "vulgarizing" experience of writing the novel.

His Chinese verse often did not meet the standard tonal patterns of classical Chinese verse, and his rhyming were sometimes wrong.

== Reception ==
Sōseki's Chinese verse has been widely praised. Historically, Chinese poetry written by Japanese had been an exercise in following the rules of Chinese prosody but lacked poetic grace associated with the best poets from China; Sōseki's poems, on the other hand, are admired even by Chinese critics who dismiss traditional Japanese kanshi.

Literary critic and historian Donald Keene called him "[probably] [t]he best kanshi poet of the Meiji era". He also noted that while Sōseki's kanshi are not as popular in contemporary Japan as his novels, this probably has more to do with the orientation of Japanese society since Sōseki's death in 1916 than with the actual literary value of the poems and novels in relation to each other.

== Works cited ==
- Keene, Donald (1998) [1984]. A History of Japanese Literature, Vol. 3: Dawn to the West – Japanese Literature of the Modern Era (Fiction) (paperback ed.). New York, NY: Columbia University Press. ISBN 978-0-231-11435-6.
