= 1906 in literature =

This article contains information about the literary events and publications of 1906.

== Events ==
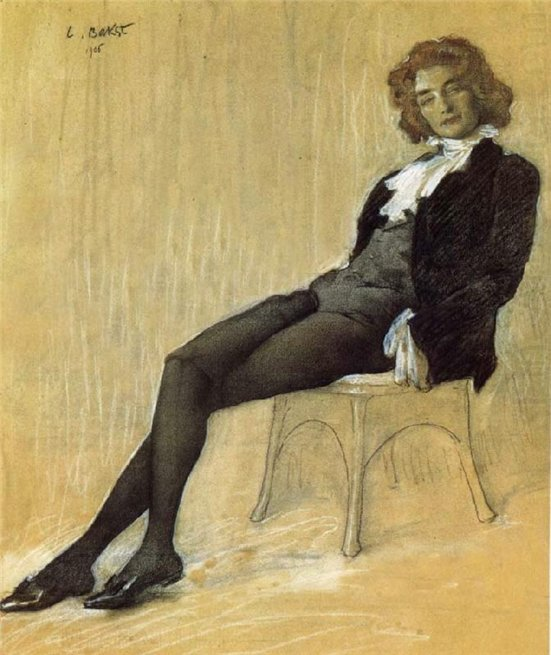
Russian writer Zinaida Gippius in exile in France during 1906, portrayed by Léon Bakst

- February 8 – The writer Hilaire Belloc becomes a Liberal Member of Parliament of the United Kingdom.
- February 15 – J. M. Dent and Co. initiates the U.K. Everyman's Library series, edited by Ernest Rhys. The first title is Boswell's Life of Johnson.
- March 13 – The Romanian nationalist historian Nicolae Iorga instigates a boycott of the National Theatre Bucharest over its staging of French-language plays. A riot ensues.
- April 10–October 13 – Maxim Gorky visits the United States with his mistress, the actress Maria Andreyeva, to raise funds for the Bolsheviks. In the Adirondack Mountains he writes his novel of revolutionary conversion and struggle, The Mother (Мать, Mat'). The couple then move to Capri.
- April 18 – The 1906 San Francisco earthquake destroys the unfinished premises of Stanford University Library. Many of the city's leading poets and writers retreat to join the arts colony at Carmel-by-the-Sea, California known as The Barness.
- May–October – Jack London's novel White Fang is serialized in the American magazine Outing.
- June – Virginia Stephen, the future Virginia Woolf, writes her first work of fiction, a short story which becomes known as "Phyllis and Rosamond" when first published, posthumously.
- June 28 – The Union Gospel News ceased publication.
- July 11 – The Murder of Grace Brown in Herkimer County, New York will inspire Theodore Dreiser's novel An American Tragedy (1925) and Jennifer Donnelly's young-adult novel A Northern Light (2003).
- Pre-September – The last full-scale court performance of gambuh dance-drama is held in Bali.
- September 1 – Annie Carroll Moore begins work as Superintendent of the Department of Work with Children at the New York Public Library.
- September 18 – August Strindberg's naturalist drama Miss Julie (Fröken Julie), written in 1888, is first performed on the Swedish professional stage, on tour in Lund, directed by August Falck, with Manda Bjorling in the title rôle and August Palme as Jean. It is first staged in Stockholm on December 13 at the Folkan (People's Theatre).
- November 8 – Max Reinhardt inaugurates the Kammerspiele series of new plays at the Deutsches Theater in Berlin, with a production of Ghosts by Henrik Ibsen, designed by Edvard Munch.
- November 20 – Frank Wedekind's play Spring Awakening: A Children's Tragedy (Frühlings Erwachen), completed 1901, receives its first staging, as the second work presented in the Deutsches Theater's Kammerspiele series in Berlin, directed by Max Reinhardt.
- December 24 – Reginald Fessenden transmits the first radio program, a poetry reading, a violin solo, and a speech, from Brant Rock, Massachusetts.
- unknown dates
  - Livraria Lello & Irmão opens a new bookstore in Porto (Portugal).
  - The magazine Eesti Kirjandus (Estonian Literature) is founded in the Governorate of Estonia, as part of the Estonian national awakening.
  - Japanese literary scholar Tsubouchi Shōyō founds the Bungei Kyokai (Literary Arts Movement) at Waseda University, promoting the development of Shingeki drama.

== New books ==
=== Fiction ===
- Pio Baroja – Paradox, rey (King Paradox)
- Rex Beach – The Spoilers
- Godfrey Benson – Tracks in the Snow
- Marjorie Bowen – The Viper of Milan
- Hall Caine – Drink: A Love Story on a Great Question
- Paul Carus – Amitabha
- Mary Cholmondeley – Prisoners
- William De Morgan – Joseph Vance
- Arthur Conan Doyle – Sir Nigel
- Douglas Morey Ford – A Time of Terror: The Story of a Great Revenge (A.D. 1910)
- Ford Madox Ford – The Fifth Queen
- Zona Gale – Romance Island
- John Galsworthy – The Man of Property
- Karl Adolph Gjellerup – Der Pilger Kamanita: Ein Legendenroman (Pilgrimen Kamanita, The Pilgrim Kamanita)
- Ellen Glasgow – The Wheel of Life
- Elinor Glyn – Beyond the Rocks
- Remy de Gourmont – Une Nuit au Luxembourg (A Night in the Luxembourg)
- O. Henry – The Four Million
- Hermann Hesse – Beneath the Wheel (Unterm Rad)
- Robert Hichens – The Call of the Blood
- Mikhail Kuzmin – Wings («Крылья»)
- William John Locke – The Beloved Vagabond
- Arthur Machen – The House of Souls
- George Moore – My Dead Life
- Robert Musil – The Confusions of Young Törless (Die Verwirrungen des Zöglings Törless)
- Natsume Sōseki (夏目 漱石)
  - Botchan (坊っちゃん)
  - Kusamakura (草枕, Grass Pillow)
  - Shumi no Iden (趣味の遺伝, The Heredity of Taste)
- E. Phillips Oppenheim – A Lost Leader
- Baroness Orczy
  - I Will Repay
  - A Son of the People
- David M. Parry – The Scarlet Empire
- Rafael Sabatini – Bardelys the Magnificent
- Felix Salten (attributed) – Josephine Mutzenbacher
- Upton Sinclair – The Jungle
- Rabindranath Tagore – Naukadubi (The Wreck)
- Mary Augusta Ward – Fenwick's Career
- H. G. Wells – In the Days of the Comet
- Owen Wister – Lady Baltimore
- P. G. Wodehouse – Love Among the Chickens

=== Children and young people ===
- L. Frank Baum
  - John Dough and the Cherub
  - Annabel (as Suzanne Metcalf)
  - Aunt Jane's Nieces (as Edith Van Dyne)
  - Daughters of Destiny (as Schuyler Staunton)
  - Sam Steele's Adventures on Land and Sea (as Capt. Hugh Fitzgerald)
  - The Twinkle Tales (as Laura Bancroft)
- Angela Brazil – The Fortunes of Philippa
- Frances Hodgson Burnett
  - Queen Silver-Bell
  - Racketty-Packetty House
- Norman Duncan – The Adventures of Billy Topsail
- Rudyard Kipling – Puck of Pook's Hill
- Selma Lagerlöf – The Wonderful Adventures of Nils (Nils Holgerssons underbara resa genom Sverige)
- Jack London – White Fang
- Ferenc Molnár – A Pál utcai fiúk (The Paul Street Boys)
- Ferenc Móra – Öreg diófák alatt (Beneath Old Walnut Trees)
- Edith Nesbit
  - The Railway Children (book publication)
  - The Story of the Amulet
- Beatrix Potter
  - The Tale of Mr. Jeremy Fisher
  - The Story of a Fierce Bad Rabbit
  - The Story of Miss Moppet
- Carolyn Wells – Patty's Summer Days

=== Drama ===
- Hall Caine – The Bondman Play
- Benjamin Chapin – Lincoln
- Paul Claudel – Partage de midi (The Break of Midnight, published)
- Owen Davis – Nellie, the Beautiful Cloak Model
- John Galsworthy – The Silver Box
- Paul Gavault and Robert Charvay – Mademoiselle Josette, My Woman
- Maxim Gorky – Barbarians
- Harley Granville-Barker – Waste (refused public performance licence in UK)
- Sacha Guitry – Chez les Zoaques
- Winifred Mary Letts – The Eyes of the Blind
- George Barr McCutcheon – Brewster's Millions (adaptation)
- Emma Orczy (Baroness Orczy) – The Sin of William Jackson
- Anthony E. Wills – Blundering Billy

=== Poetry ===
- Mikhail Kuzmin – Alexandrian Songs

=== Non-fiction ===
- Lord Acton (died 1902) – Lectures on Modern History
- Henry Adams – The Education of Henry Adams
- Hall Caine – My Story
- Joseph Conrad – The Mirror of the Sea: Memories and Impressions
- Percy Dearmer and Ralph Vaughan Williams (eds) – The English Hymnal
- Henry Watson Fowler and Francis George Fowler – The King's English
- Okakura Kakuzō – The Book of Tea (in English)
- Robert Sherard – The Life of Oscar Wilde
- Mark Twain – What Is Man?
- Helen Zimmern – The Italy of the Italians

== Births ==
- January 6 – Eberhard Wolfgang Möller, German playwright and poet (died 1972)
- January 9 – Barbara Sleigh, English children's writer (died 1982)
- January 19 – Robin Hyde (Iris Guiver Wilkinson), New Zealand poet and novelist (suicide 1939)
- January 22 – Robert E. Howard, American fantasy author (suicide 1936)
- January 23 – Anya Seton, American romantic author (died 1990)
- February 8 – Henry Roth, American novelist and short story writer (died 1995)
- February 13 – Máirtín Ó Cadhain, Irish language writer (died 1970)
- March 25 – A. J. P. Taylor, English historian (died 1990)
- April 13 – Samuel Beckett, Irish writer Nobel Prize in Literature winner (died 1989)
- May 8 – Esther Hoffe, Israeli mistress of Max Brod (died 2007)
- May 9 – Eleanor Estes, American librarian, author and illustrator (died 1988)
- May 21 – Profira Sadoveanu, Romanian journalist, memoirist, biographer, editor and translator (died 2003)
- May 22 – Lesbia Soravilla, Cuban writer (died 1989)
- June 23 – Wolfgang Koeppen, German novelist (died 1996)
- June 27
  - Catherine Cookson, English popular novelist (died 1998)
  - Vernon Watkins, Welsh poet (died 1967)
- July 4 – Margaret Douglas-Home, English writer and musician (died 1996)
- July 18 – Clifford Odets, American dramatist (died 1963)
- August 28 – John Betjeman, English poet laureate (died 1984)
- August 30 – Elizabeth Longford, English biographer (died 2002)
- September 1 – Eleanor Hibbert, English romantic novelist under several pseudonyms (died 1993)
- September 25 – Franklin Garrett, American local historian (died 2000)
- September 27 – William Empson, English poet and literary critic (died 1984)
- 30 September – J. I. M. Stewart, Scottish-born novelist and academic critic (died 1994)
- October 10 – R. K. Narayan, Indian novelist writing in English (died 2001)
- October 16 – Dino Buzzati, Italian author (died 1972)
- October 14 – Hannah Arendt, German-American intellectual (died 1975)
- November 12 – George Dillon, American editor and poet (died 1968)
- November 13 – John Sparrow, English literary scholar (died 1992)
- November 18 – Klaus Mann, German-born novelist (died 1949)
- November 29 – Barbara C. Freeman, English writer and poet (died 1999)
- November 30 – John Dickson Carr, American detective fiction writer (died 1977)
- December 8 – Richard Llewellyn, British novelist (died 1983)

== Deaths ==
- February 9 – Paul Laurence Dunbar, American poet, novelist and playwright (born 1872)
- March 1 – Lettie S. Bigelow, American poet and author (born 1849)
- March 2 – Ellen Mary Clerke, English novelist, poet and writer on astronomy (born 1840)
- March 20
  - Vasile Pogor, Moldavian/Romanian poet, scholar and politician (born 1833)
  - A. D. T. Whitney, American poet and girls' writer (born 1824)
- April 6 – Alexander Kielland, Norwegian novelist (born 1849)
- April 11 – Francis Pharcellus Church, American editor and publisher (born 1839)
- April 14 – Nora Chesson, English poet (born 1871)
- May 5 – Eliza Brightwen, Scottish naturalist (born 1830)
- May 23 – Henrik Ibsen, Norwegian playwright (born 1828)
- June 29 – Albert Sorel, French historian (born 1842)
- June 30 – Jean Lorrain, French Symbolist poet (born 1855)
- August 17 – Elizabeth Missing Sewell, English novelist and educationist (born 1815)
- August 19 – Agnes Catherine Maitland, English academic, novelist and cookery writer (born 1850)
- September 10 – Rose Porter, American religious novelist (born 1845)
- September 24 – Charlotte Riddell, Anglo-Irish novelist and editor (born 1832)
- October 9 – Wilhelmina FitzClarence, Countess of Munster, English novelist (born 1830)
- December 6 – Anne Ross Cousin, English poet (born 1824)

== Awards ==
- Nobel Prize for Literature: Giosuè Carducci
