= Misao Fujimura =

Japanese writer

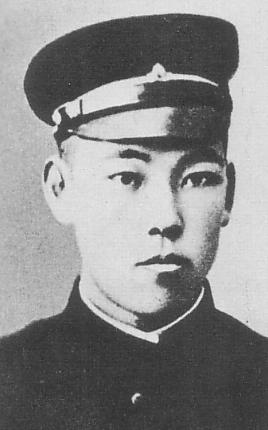
- Born: 20 July 1886; Hokkaidō
- Died: 22 May 1903 (aged 16); Nikkō, Tochigi
- Resting place: Aoyama Cemetery, Tokyo, Japan
- Education: Hokkaido Sapporo Minami High School; Tōyō Univ. Keihoku High School

Misao Fujimura (藤村 操, Fujimura Misao; July 20, 1886 – May 22, 1903) was a Japanese philosophy student and poet, largely remembered due to his farewell poem.

== Biography ==
Fujimura was born in Hokkaidō. His grandfather was a former samurai of the Morioka Domain, and his father relocated to Hokkaidō after the Meiji Restoration as a director of the forerunner of Hokkaido Bank. Fujimura graduated from middle school in Sapporo.

Fujimura was a student at the First Higher School, an elite high school in Tokyo. The school acted as a preparatory school for entry into Tokyo Imperial University. During his time at the high school, he was taught by the novelist Natsume Sōseki. Sōseki scolded Fujimura at least twice because the student did not read the class' assigned texts before the lessons, including a few days prior to Fujimura's death.

=== Death ===
Fujimura died by suicide at Kegon Falls in Tochigi Prefecture on 22 May 1903. He wrote a farewell poem directly on the trunk of a tree before jumping from the top of the waterfall. His uncle travelled to the site of his death and transcribed the poem to publish it in the newspaper with an obituary. Fujimura's body was found 42 days after his death; the poem remained on the tree until it was removed by local authorities between 18 and 19 June. His grave is at Aoyama Cemetery in Tokyo.

== Poem ==
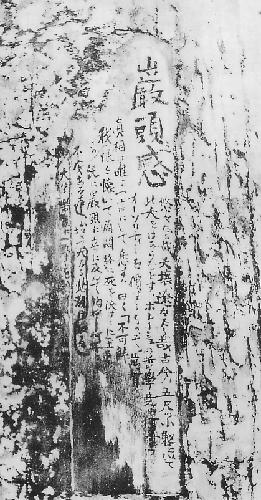
Misao Fujimura’s suicide note

巌頭之感
悠々たる哉天壌、
遼々たる哉古今、
五尺の小躯を以て此大をはからむとす。
ホレーショの哲學竟に何等のオーソリチィーを價するものぞ。
萬有の眞相は唯だ一言にして悉す、
曰く「不可解」。
我この恨を懐いて煩悶、終に死を決するに至る。
既に巌頭に立つに及んで
胸中何等の不安あるなし。
始めて知る
大なる悲觀は大なる樂觀に一致するを

Thoughts at the Precipice
Alas! The vastness of the Universe has overwhelmed me!
Alas! How illimitable is Time!
Dwarf that I am, five feet of manhood only I would embrace with this immensity.
What value or authority has the philosophy of [Horatio] when finally summed up?
The real nature of the Universe can only be expressed in the word: incomprehensible!
Pierced by this thought as if by a sword of anguish I have at last resolved to die, and already as I stand high on the rocks ready to take the plunge, my heart knows peace for the first time. For the first time I understand that the extreme limit of despair coincides with the extreme limit of felicity.
—Bonnard 1926, p. 352

== Aftermath and legacy ==
In the wake of his death, the Japanese government banned students from reading novels as it was felt that doing so led students to despair, scepticism, and ultimately suicide. Efforts to censor the poem were futile as it quickly spread in popularity, being quoted by youths in both the city and the countryside.

Fujimura's suicide was one of the largest news stories of the year. At the time people explained his actions as being derived from a sense of philosophical despair. Some praised him as "Japan's Hamlet", whereas others saw him as symptomatic of a society that was becoming too introspective. Robert Tuck notes, by using a homosocial frame of reference to reflect male–male desire, that after Fujimura's death his peers memorialised him in admiration of his "literary skills, physical beauty, or sincerity of purpose". When a classmate was shown Fujimura's corpse, he quoted the Tang poet Liu Xiyi, cross-identifying himself as a female subject in his expression of admiration for Fujimura. Fujimura's contemporary, and later philosopher Watsuji Tetsurō recalled the poem being "burnt into [the] hearts" of Japanese youths.

News of Fujimura's death was upsetting to Sōseki, who was concerned that he had contributed to it. The student became a subject in the work of Natsume Sōseki, including a poem and two novels: I Am a Cat (1905–1906) and Kusamakura (1906). In Kusamakura, the protagonist praises Fujimura and decries those who were not impressed with him. Tuck analyses the novel's main female character, Nami, as an analogue to Fujimura by linking her character to death by drowning. As such, he considers her to be a projection of Fujimura's identity that operates as both a male and female "object and avatar of homosocial desire."
