= The Miner =

1908 novel by Natsume Sōseki

- Author: Natsume Sōseki
- Original title: 坑夫
- Translator: Jay Rubin
- Language: Japanese
- Genre: Novel
- Publication date: 1908
- Publication place: Japan
- Media type: Print
- Pages: 189
- OCLC: 33616679
- Preceded by: Nowaki (1907)
- Followed by: Sanshirō (1908)

The Miner (Japanese: 坑夫, Hepburn: Kōfu) is a 1908 novel by Japanese writer Natsume Sōseki. The novel recounts the story of a young man who begins working in a mine following a failed relationship, with extensive attention paid to his perceptions, both at the time of events and in retrospect as a mature adult. It was translated into English in 1988 by Jay Rubin. Critically panned at the time of publication, The Miner has since been reassessed for its literary innovation.

== Plot ==
In The Miner, the 19-year-old protagonist decides to flee his hometown of Tokyo after his relationship falls apart. He encounters a grotesque figure who specializes in recruiting cheap labour, and is persuaded to work in a copper mine. The story follows his journey towards and descent into the mine. The protagonist's perceptions and later reflections are described in great detail, such that a "split-second of visual clarity" is accorded three pages of analysis.

The protagonist does not get along with the other "animalistic" miners, but eventually meets an educated individual who is, like himself, fleeing from a failed relationship. This miner convinces him to return to his former life. The novel ends with the protagonist emerging from the mine. Outside the mine, he remarks on the beauty of a flower and the ugliness of the miners. He then visits a clinic for a mandatory examination, and is reminded of human mortality by the scent there. He passes the same flower and no longer finds it beautiful, nor does he find the miners ugly:

As always, the miners were looking down at me from their barracks, chin on hand. Their faces, which before had filled me with such loathing, now seemed like clay dolls' heads. They were not ugly, not frightening, not hateful. They were just faces, as the face of the most beautiful woman in Japan is just a face. And I was exactly like these men, a human being of flesh and bone, entirely ordinary and entirely meaningless.

== Background ==
The Miner began serialization on 1 January 1908 in the Asahi Shimbun newspaper. The novel's setting was suggested to Sōseki by a man who worked in the Ashio Copper Mine following his own romantic problems. The man visited Sōseki and insisted on selling his story as the basis for a novel. Apart from these basic plot elements, the novel was, according to Jay Rubin, a "direct result of [Sōseki's] continuing exploration of his own internal landscape." Sōseki took twelve pages of notes from the man. The first two-fifths of the book are based on story material from the first half-page of these notes, and this is the novel's most unconventional section. The remainder of the story follows the notes more closely.

When interviewed about the novel, Sōseki said, "I am not so much interested in events themselves as in laying bare the truth behind them." He chose to narrate the novel retrospectively because it allowed him to thoroughly analyze the protagonist's actions and motives. Rather than focusing on the cause-and-effect relationship between events, he was curious about the discrete elements composing each event. Sōseki said that "people lacking such intellectual curiosity will not find it much fun."

== Reception ==
The reception of contemporary critics was universally negative, and the work was judged "undeniably inferior". The Miner, which followed two other critically panned works (Nowaki and The Poppy), was perceived as a confirmation of Sōseki's decline as a writer. Halfway through serialization, a collection of articles on the novel was published in the Chūōkōron magazine. None of the critics, including a devoted Sōseki fan who had enjoyed all of his previous works, had anything positive to say. One critic commented, "You'd think that Sōseki was some kind of antique dealer, the way he attaches a certificate of authenticity to everything in the novel."

Some modern critics have reassessed the work for its experimental value. Jay Rubin, who translated it into English, regards The Miner as Sōseki's "single most modern work, an antinovel that set him at the very forefront of the avant-garde in world literature." Rubin attributes the reception of Sōseki's contemporaries to the novel's focus on perception rather than plot or character. Beongcheon Yu has asserted that The Miner has no thematic connection to Sōseki's other works. In contrast, Rubin sees The Miner as a turning point in Sōseki's view of the average human being—from an evil "other" to an unreliable "self"—that persisted in his later works. Shin'ichirō Nakamura viewed The Miner as an early example of stream of consciousness fiction, though Rubin considers this characterization inaccurate because of the retrospective, rather than immediate, narration. Haruki Murakami has two characters discuss the book in his novel Kafka on the Shore.
