= Grass on the Wayside =

Japanese novel

- Author: Sōseki Natsume
- Original title: 道草
- Translator: Edwin McClellan
- Language: Japanese
- Publisher: The Asahi Shimbun (newspaper); Iwanami Shoten (book)
- Publication date: 1915
- Publication place: Japan
- English publication date: 1969
- Media type: Print

Grass on the Wayside (道草, Michikusa) is a 1915 Japanese autobiographical novel by Sōseki Natsume. It is his only autobiographical work of fiction, and his last completed work. Together with Kokoro (1914), Grass on the Wayside is often cited as Natsume's major literary effort.

== Plot ==
After having returned from England, Kenzō, an egocentric, emotionally detached man in his thirties, teaches English literature at Tokyo Imperial University. His wife Osumi, with whom he constantly argues, is pregnant with their third child, and to improve their finances he starts writing articles for magazines until late in the night. While he holds neither one of his siblings in high regard, he supports his older, sickly half-sister Onatsu with a monthly income, although she is herself married (her husband Hida is rumoured to spend his money on a mistress), and he also lends money to his older brother Chōtarō.

One day, Kenzō is approached by his former adoptive father Shimada, who asks him for his financial support. Kenzō remembers his secure but loveless childhood at his possessive foster parents' home, where he lived between the age of two and eight. When Shimada divorced his wife Otsune and remarried, Kenzō first lived with Otsune before returning to the home of his natural parents, where he was regarded as a burden.

Although reluctantly, Kenzō repeatedly gives Shimada the sums he asks for, commented on disparagingly by Osumi. In a final agreement reached between the two men and their emissaries, Kenzō pays Shimada 100 yen, with Shimada in return signing a document declaring that he will never make contact with Kenzō again.

== Characters ==
- Kenzō: a professor of English literature
- Osumi: Kenzō's wife
- Shimada: Kenzō's former foster father
- Otsune: Shimada's first wife and Kenzō's former foster mother
- Onatsu: Kenzō's older sister
- Hida: Onatsu's husband
- Chōtarō: Kenzō's older brother
- Ofuji: Shimada's second wife
- Shibano: Ofuji's former husband
- Onui: Ofuji's and Shibano's daughter
- Kenzō's father-in-law

== Biographical background ==
Natsume's novel describes the two years between his return from England in 1903 and the beginning of his career as a writer. Like his literary alter ego Kenzō, Natsume was a professor of English literature at Tokyo Imperial University and wrote for literary magazines in his spare time.

== Release history ==
Grass on the Wayside first appeared in serialised form in the Asahi Shimbun between 3 June 1915 and 10 September 1915. A book publication by Iwanami Shoten followed the same year. Edwin McClellan's English translation appeared in 1969.
