= Kusamakura =

Kusamakura (草枕, lit. "grass pillow") is a makurakotoba, or standard phrase, used in Japanese poetry to signify a journey.
It may also refer to:

- Kusamakura (novel), a Japanese novel by Natsume Sōseki
- Kusamakura (album), a compilation album by Italian singer Alice
