= The Heredity of Taste =

Novel by Natsume Sōseki

The Heredity of Taste (趣味の遺傳, Shumi no Iden) is a novella by Japanese writer Natsume Sōseki. It was written in December 1905, following the conclusion of the Russo-Japanese War of 1904–5. In it, Sōseki speaks out against the atrocity of war, the sacrifice of soldiers' lives, and the loss of their individuality.

It was first published in the January 1906 issue of the magazine Teikoku Bungaku ("Imperial Literature").

== Plot ==
The novella begins with the narrator's arrival at a train station, where Japanese soldiers are returning from the Russo-Japanese War of 1904–5. The narrator sees a soldier who bears a striking resemblance to a friend of his, Kō-san, an infantry lieutenant who was killed during that war. The narrator visits Kō-san's grave at a temple and discovers that a young woman has also been visiting the grave of the soldier, who was unmarried. The narrator visits Kō-san's mother, where he finds his friend's diary. There he reads that Kō-san had met a young woman at a post office. After investigating, the narrator proffers his theory on the heredity of taste – the woman and Kō-san found each other attractive owing to a bond forged between their ancestors decades ago.

== Translations ==
The Heredity of Taste is available in two translations, both published under the Tuttle imprint. The first is a 1974 translation by Akito Itō and Graeme Wilson, in a volume which also includes two other early works by Sōseki, Ten Nights of Dream and Hearing Things. The newer version is a standalone 2004 translation by Sammy I. Tsunematsu.
