= Graeme Wilson (translator) =

British academic and translator

- Born: 9 May 1919
- Died: 2 September 1992 (aged 73)
- Occupation: Translator of Japanese books

Graeme McDonald Wilson (9 May 1919 – 2 September 1992) was a British academic and translator. He served in the Fleet Air Arm (1939–1946) and, following World War II, joined the Civil Service. He lectured for the British Council, wrote reviews for English literature journals, and wrote radio scripts for the Australian Broadcasting Company. In 1964, he was seconded to the Foreign Service as counsellor and civil air attaché at twelve Far Eastern posts. Between 1968 and 1969 he was a Ford Foundation Fellow of the National Translation Center in Austin, Texas. His works include co-translations, with Aiko Itō, of I Am a Cat and Ten Nights of Dreams by Natsume Sōseki.

== Translations ==
- Girl in the Rain
- I Am a Cat, by Natsume Sōseki (with Aiko Itō), 1972
- Ten Nights of Dreams, Hearing Things by Natsume Sōseki (with Aiko Itō)
- The Heredity of Taste by Natsume Sōseki
- From the Morning of the World: Poems from the by Man'yōshū
- Three Contemporary Japanese Poets: Hitoshi Anzai, Kazuko Shiraishi, Shuntarō Tanikawa (with Atsumi Ikuko)
- Face at the Bottom of the World and Other Poems, translations of the modern Japanese poetry of Hagiwara Sakutaro
- Tree of Happiness
