= Kokoro =

1914 novel by Natsume Sōseki

- English version front cover
- Author: Natsume Sōseki
- Original title: Kokoro: Sensei no isho
- Language: Japanese
- Publisher: Asahi Shimbun (newspaper); Iwanami Shoten (book)
- Publication date: 1914
- Publication place: Japan
- English publication date: 1941
- Media type: Print
- Preceded by: The Wayfarer

Kokoro (こゝろ; or in modern kana usage こころ) is a 1914 Japanese novel by Natsume Sōseki, and the final part of a trilogy starting with To the Spring Equinox and Beyond and followed by The Wayfarer (both 1912). Set in the Meiji era, the novel tells of the acquaintance between a young man and an older man called "Sensei" ("teacher" or "master"), who holds a secret from his past regarding the death of a friend.

Kokoro was first published in serial form in the newspaper Asahi Shimbun. Along with Osamu Dazai's No Longer Human (1948), Kokoro is one of the best-selling novels of all time in Japan.

== Background ==
=== Circumstance ===
Sōseki explained in the preface that he originally intended to write various short stories and to unify them into Kokoro. However, the short story that was supposed to be the first episode, Sensei no isho (先生の遺書; sensei's testament), became longer than he had originally expected, so he decided to publish it as a single work in a three-part structure, keeping the original title "Kokoro".

=== Title ===
During the novel's initial serial run, from 20 April to 11 August 1914, it was printed under the title Kokoro: Sensei no isho (心 先生の遺書; Kokoro: Sensei's Testament). When later published in book form by Iwanami Shoten, its title was shortened to Kokoro; the rendering of the word "kokoro" itself was also changed from kanji (心) to hiragana (こゝろ).

=== Structure ===
Kokoro consists of three parts. The first two are told from the perspective of the younger man, relating his memories of an older man who was a friend and mentor during his university days whom he addresses as "Sensei". Part three, which makes up the second half of the novel, is a long confessional letter written by Sensei to the narrator. In this letter Sensei reveals, in keeping with an earlier promise, the full story of his past.

== Plot ==
=== Part I: "Sensei and I" ===
The narrator has been left on his own in Kamakura after his friend, who invited him to vacation there, is called home by his family. One day, after finishing his usual swim in the sea, he takes notice of a man in the changing house who is being accompanied by a foreign guest, preparing to head for the water. He sees the same man each day thereafter, though no longer with his foreign companion. After some days, he finds an occasion to make the man's acquaintance. As they grow closer, he comes to refer to the man as “Sensei.”

On parting in Kamakura, as Sensei prepares to return home to Tokyo, the narrator asks if he can call on Sensei at his home sometime. He receives an affirmative, though less enthusiastic than hoped for, response. Several weeks after his own return to Tokyo, he makes an initial visit, only to find Sensei away. On his next visit, when he again finds Sensei away, he learns from Sensei's wife that Sensei makes monthly visits to the gravesite of a friend.

Over subsequent months and years, through periodic visits, the narrator comes to know Sensei and his wife quite well. At the same time, Sensei insists on maintaining a certain distance. He refuses to talk of his deceased friend and is reluctant to explain his own reclusion and lack of occupation. He also cautions the narrator that intimacy and admiration will only lead to disillusionment and disdain. However, he does promise that one day, when the time is right, he will divulge in full the story of his past.

=== Part II: "My Parents and I" ===
The narrator returns home to the country after graduation. His father, who had been in ill health, enjoys a respite from his illness. They set a date for a graduation celebration, only to have their plans put on hold by news of Emperor Meiji falling ill. As the weeks go by, the narrator's father gradually loses his vigor and becomes bedridden. From his bed, he follows the papers as the Emperor declines and eventually dies.

After the Emperor's passing, the narrator is pressured by his mother to secure employment to put his father at ease. At the same time, his father's condition holds him close to home in the country. At his mother's urging, he writes to Sensei to request assistance in finding a position in Tokyo. While not expecting any favorable response on the matter of employment, he does at least expect some reply and is disappointed when none arrives. Summer wears on, and the rest of the family is summoned home in anticipation of the father's final hour. All are moved when news comes of the suicide (junshi) of General Maresuke Nogi, who takes his own life to follow his Emperor in death.

Shortly thereafter, a telegram from Sensei arrives, summoning the narrator to Tokyo. Unable to leave his father, the narrator refuses Sensei's request, first by telegram and then by a letter detailing his situation. Some days later, a thick letter arrives by registered mail from Sensei. Stealing away from his father's bedside, the narrator opens the letter to find that it is the previously promised account of Sensei's past. Leafing through the pages, a line near the end catches his eye: "By the time this letter reaches you, I'll be gone from this world. I'll have already passed away."

Rushing to the station, the narrator boards the first train for Tokyo. Once on board, he takes out Sensei's letter and reads it through from the start.

=== Part III: "Sensei's Testament" ===
The narrator reads Sensei's letter on the train toward Tokyo. Sensei begins by explaining his reticence over the summer as he wrestled with the problem of his own continued existence. He then explains the motivation for his current actions. The remainder of the letter is an accounting of Sensei's life.

Sensei grows up in the countryside and loses both of his parents to illness while still in his late teens. As an only child, he inherits the family's considerable wealth, which his uncle steps in to help manage during the years over which, as previously planned, he pursues his education in Tokyo. Each summer Sensei returns to his home, where his uncle suggests that he should marry soon and establish himself in the community as the family heir, but Sensei, not yet interested in marriage, declines. Eventually it comes to light that his uncle's businesses are struggling, and much of Sensei's wealth has been poured into losing ventures. Sensei salvages what remains, arranges for the sale of his house and possessions, visits his parents' gravesite one last time, and turns his back on his home town, severing all ties with his relations.

Back at his studies in Tokyo, Sensei decides to trade his boisterous student lodgings for calmer quarters. He hears of a widow looking to take in a boarder, and is accepted after a brief interview. The household is quiet, with just the widow, her daughter, and a maidservant. Sensei is smitten with the daughter at first sight, but at the same time the deceit of his uncle has left him generally distrustful. After some time, he thinks to ask the widow, who treats him as family, for her daughter's hand, but still holds back for fear that the women are playing him just as his uncle had.

Sensei has a friend and classmate from the same hometown, whom he refers to simply as K. (Note: The original work in Japanese also used a capital ⟨K⟩ as a substitute for his name.) K is the son of a Buddhist priest, but was adopted by the family of a prominent local physician who funds his study of medicine in Tokyo. Contrary to their wishes, K pursues his own passions of religion and philosophy, and is disowned as a result. Sensei feels some obligation to assist his friend, who is struggling to maintain an aggressive course of study while at the same time supporting himself. With the widow's approval, Sensei convinces K to join him as a second boarder, arguing that K's presence there will serve toward his own spiritual betterment. After a while, K warms to his new surroundings and grows more sociable. Sensei is pleased with the improvement in his friend's demeanor, but also begins to see K as a rival for the daughter's affection. During a walking tour he and K set out together on the Boshu peninsula, Sensei is tormented by suspicions, wondering if K might not have his eye on the daughter and fearing that the daughter may in fact favor K. He longs to divulge to K his feelings for the daughter, but he lacks the courage to do so.

Autumn comes and classes begin again. Sensei returns home at times to find K and the daughter conversing amiably, and he worries they're growing close. He thinks again to ask the widow for her daughter's hand, but again holds back, this time for fear that K holds the daughter's affection. K finally confesses his love for the daughter to Sensei. Sensei, shocked and dismayed, is unable to muster a response. In the days that follow, K confides in Sensei that he is torn between his long-held ideals and his newfound passion. Sensing K's vulnerability, and at the same time seeking to serve his own interest, Sensei reminds K of his own words on discipline and servitude to a cause. K withdraws into reticence. Sensei fears that K is preparing to shift his life's course out of love for the daughter. After confirming that K has not yet approached her, Sensei asks the widow for her daughter's hand. She acquiesces, and the matter is easily settled. That same day, the widow talks to her daughter. Only K remains unaware of the arrangements until he learns of these from the widow. She scolds Sensei for leaving his friend in the dark. Sensei resolves to talk with K the next morning, but during the night, K takes his own life. K leaves behind a note, but absent is the rebuke that Sensei dreads. K's feelings for the daughter, along with Sensei's betrayal of his friend's trust, will remain a secret.

Sensei notifies K's family and arranges K's burial in the nearby Zōshigaya Cemetery with the family's approval. Shortly after, Sensei and the ladies relocate to a new house. Sensei finishes his studies, and half a year later weds the daughter. Sensei makes monthly pilgrimages to K's grave. His betrayal of K, and K's death, continue to cast a shadow over his married life, yet he remains unable to burden his wife with his secret. Having lost faith in humanity in general, and now in his own self, Sensei withdraws from the world to lead an idle life. As the years pass and he reflects further on K, he comes to realize that K's suicide was less about lost love and more about alienation and disappointment in oneself. Sensei feels himself drawn, more and more, to follow K's path. With the ending of the Meiji era and the passing of General Nogi, Sensei decides that he's outlived his time and must part from the world. His final request to the narrator is that his wife never know his story, and that it be held private until after she's gone.

== Themes ==
Although Sensei feels guilt for having caused his friend's death, he comes to believe that K's death was not a direct consequence of his unhappiness in love, but rather the same loneliness from which Sensei himself suffers. Translator Edwin McClellan writes, "psychological guilt [is] less important than philosophical isolation". McClellan traces the theme of seeking relief from isolation through Natsume's earlier works of The Gate and Kojin to its solution in Sensei's suicide in Kokoro.

Even though guilt comes into play, taking responsibility for one's actions and mistakes is paramount in the Confucian and Japanese ideology portrayed in the novel, and Sensei understands those traditions. Sensei clearly feels responsible for K's suicide, displayed in his constant trips to the cemetery at Zoshigaya to visit K's grave, his belief that he is being punished by heaven, or is destined for misery and loneliness, his belief that he must never be, or can never be, happy, because of this betrayal of K. Thus, as is often the case in Japanese culture (particularly in the Tokugawa period, but also certainly carried on beyond it), Sensei's suicide is an apology and an attempt to show penitence, or to do something about one's mistakes. He writes on several occasions that he has long known he must die, but has not the strength to kill himself just yet. He is constrained by weakness, and has not the strength to hold to either those traditional Japanese values, or the new modern Western ones that were fast replacing them throughout the Meiji era.

Jun Etō attributes the focus on isolation in Natsume's work to a philosophical crisis which the author underwent while studying in London. His contact with the more individualistic ideas of the West shattered his faith in the Confucian scholar-administrator model of traditional Japan, but he retained enough of his traditional upbringing to preclude a wholehearted embrace of Western thinking; leaving him, "a lonely, modern man". The fallen man of Natsume's conception could only escape through madness or suicide, or live on and continue to suffer.

Takeo Doi provides a contrasting interpretation of the novel, in which the psychological dominates and which sees Sensei's life as a descent into first madness, then suicide. Noting inconsistencies in Sensei's account of his uncle's fraud, he argues that Sensei's perception of his uncle's behaviour was a schizophrenic delusion created by changes in Sensei himself. He finds further confirmation of this assessment in Sensei's belief that he is being first persecuted, then entrapped by the family he goes to live with, and in the voice which Sensei says talked to him in the years after K's suicide. Sensei's own end he interprets as a homoerotic act, "loyally following his beloved into death". Translator Meredith McKinney elucidates the notion of a homosexual motive, saying "Kokoro tells the story of three young men whose hearts are 'restless with love' and of their emotional entanglements not only with the opposite sex but variously with one another. Homosexuality is not, needless to say, at issue, although a young man’s intellectually erotic attraction to an older man is beautifully evoked."

Although Sensei's story is the climax of the novel, about half its length is devoted to the story of the narrator. Etō noted the similarity between the narrator and the younger Sensei. The narrator is at an earlier stage in his own transition from a simplistic celebration of life in the opening pages to his own growing separation from mankind. The extent of the latter becomes apparent when he returns home to find that he is no longer in sympathy with his own family.

The second part of the novel, in which Sensei is physically absent, also serves as a contrast between the unthinking contentment of the narrator's father and the thoughtful discontent of Sensei. McClellan compares the "strength and dignity" of K's and Sensei's suicides with the physical indignity of the father's death, while still noting the tranquility the father manages to retain. Takeo Doi in his psychological readings sees the narrator's preference for Sensei over his real father — culminating in the abandonment of his dying father for the already dead Sensei — as a case of "father transference".

The reasons for Sensei's eventual suicide are debated. Jun Etō ascribes to it a "dual motivation": a personal desire to end his years of egoistic suffering, and a public desire to demonstrate his loyalty to the emperor. This position is supported by Sensei's own statement (albeit in jest) that his suicide would be, "through loyalty to the spirit of the Meiji era", while earlier in the book he had explicitly connected his isolation with the times he lived in: "loneliness is the price we have to pay for being born in this modern age, so full of freedom, independence, and our own egotistical selves". Isamu Fukuchi, however, contests both these points. He argues that suicide to end his own suffering would make no sense after having already endured the suffering for many years, while a distinction is to be made between loyalty to Emperor Meiji and loyalty to the spirit of the Meiji era. He sees the latter as being the conflict between, "modern ideals and traditional morality". Sensei's suicide is therefore a recognition that the end of the Meiji era has rendered as anachronisms those who, like him, are torn between modernity and tradition.

== English translations ==
Kokoro has been translated into English in 1941 by Ineko Kondo, in 1957 by Edwin McClellan, and in 2010 by Meredith McKinney.

== Adaptations ==
The novel has been adapted for film twice:

- The Heart, a 1955 film by Kon Ichikawa
- The Heart, a 1973 film by Kaneto Shindō

The novel has also been repeatedly adapted for television. Additionally, it has been adapted into anime (as part of the Aoi Bungaku series), manga (Nariko Enomoto and the Manga de Dokuha series) and satirised in a comic strip (Step Aside Pops, Kate Beaton).
