= Kairo-kō =

1905 novel by Natsume Sōseki

Kairo-kō: A Dirge
- Author: Natsume Sōseki
- Original title: 薤露行
- Translators: Toshiyuki Takamiya and Andrew Armour
- Language: Japanese
- Genre: Arthurian, fantasy
- Publication date: 1905
- Publication place: Japan

Kairo-kō: A Dirge (薤露行, Kairo-kō) is a 1905 novel by the Japanese author Natsume Sōseki. The earliest, and only major, prose treatment of the Arthurian legend in Japanese, it chronicles the adulterous love triangle between Lancelot, Guinevere, and Elaine of Astolat.

== Plot summary ==
Kairo-kō consists of a short introduction and five sections. The first section, "The Dream" recounts a conversation between Guinevere and Lancelot in which she describes her dream of a snake that coils around the pair and binds them together; it ends with Lancelot heading to a tournament. The second section, "The Mirror", relates a scene based on Tennyson's "The Lady of Shalott": the Lady can view the world only through a mirror's reflection or else she will die, but when she sees Lancelot she turns to look upon him. Her action kills her, but not before she places a death curse on Lancelot. The section "The Sleeve" relates the famous episode in which Elaine of Astolat convinces Lancelot to wear her sleeve on his shield as a token in a joust. Guinevere finds out about Lancelot's relationship with Elaine in the next section, "The Transgression"; Mordred condemns her for her infidelity against King Arthur with Lancelot. The final section, "The Boat", concerns the death of Elaine; grieving over the loss of Lancelot, she dies and is placed in a boat along with a letter proclaiming her love, and is sent downriver to Camelot.

== Background ==
Written in 1905, Kairo-kō was one of Sōseki's first novels, and helped establish him as the premier novelist of the Meiji Era. Like other of Sōseki's early works, such as the short story "Rondon tô" ("The Tower of London"), it was informed by his unpleasant stay in the United Kingdom between 1901 and 1903, during which he studied medieval and contemporary British literature.

Sōseki had worked with the Arthurian legend in The Phantom Shield, also published in 1905, though in this case the Arthurian world serves only as the backdrop for a tale of courtly love.

His chief sources for Kairo-kō were Thomas Malory's Le Morte d'Arthur and Alfred, Lord Tennyson's Arthurian poetry, particularly "The Lady of Shalott"; there are also influences from Tennyson's Idylls of the King and Edmund Spenser's The Faerie Queene (for the description of Merlin's mirror). Kairo-kō represents a mix of medieval and Victorian Western material with Japanese and Chinese forms; as the subtitle "A Dirge" suggests, the prose is highly lyrical and tempered by passages meditating on the pain and sadness tied to torrid love.

The novel's archaic writing style may have been further inspired by the Pre-Raphaelite and fin de siècle artworks Sōseki would have encountered in London.

Kairo-kō represents an exploration of the theme of adultery, a theme which recurs in much of Sōseki's later work. Literary critic Jun Etō put forth the controversial suggestion that Kairo-kō, like Sōseki's subsequent novels, contained a coded intimation of his own affair with his sister-in-law.

Kairo-kō was translated into English by Toshiyuki Takamiya and Andrew Armour for the volume Arthurian Literature II, edited by Richard Barber and published in 1982.
