= The Wayfarer (novel) =

Novel by Natsume Sōseki

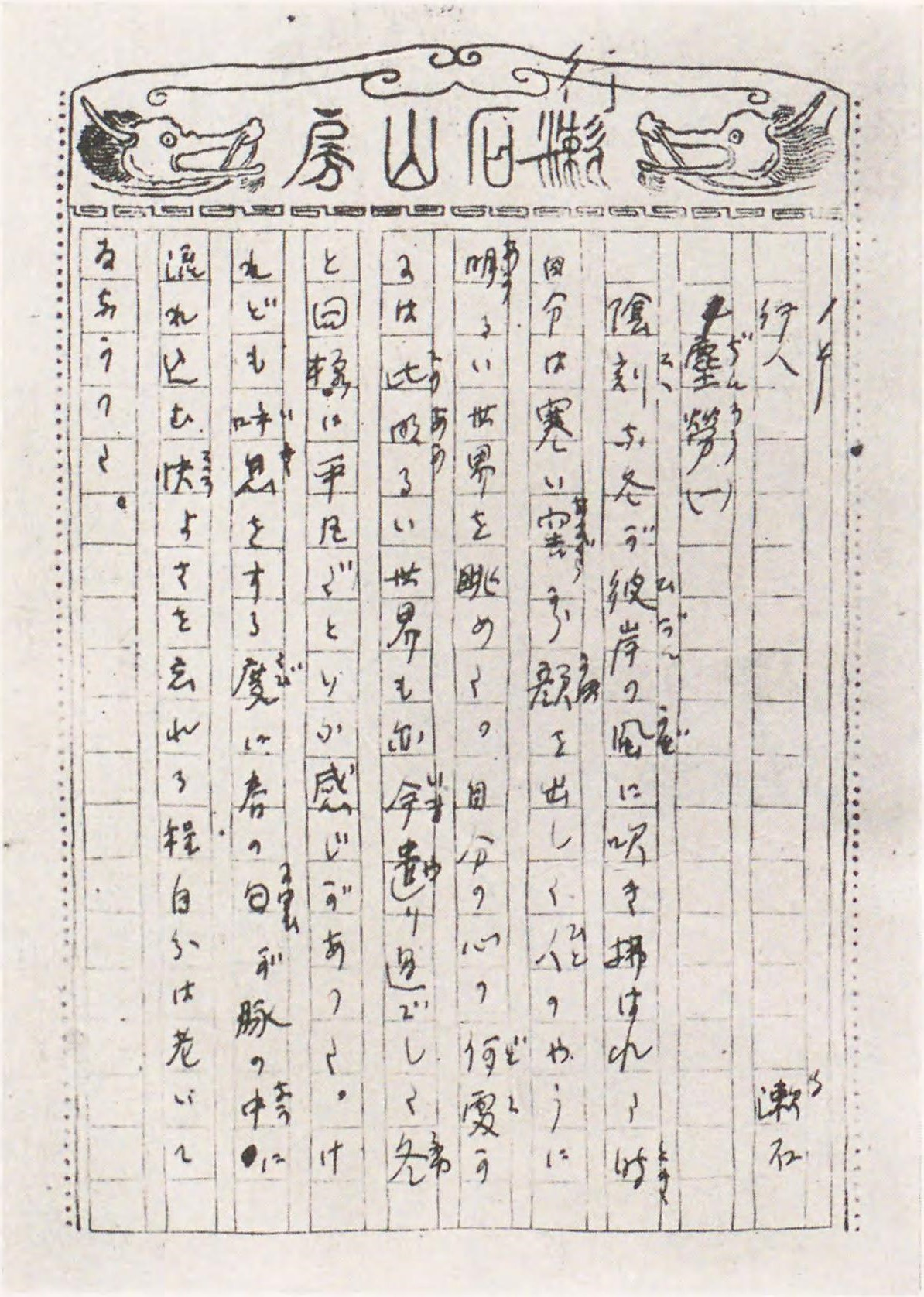
- Author: Natsume Sōseki
- Original title: Kōjin
- Translator: Beongcheon Yu
- Language: Japanese
- Publisher: The Asahi Shimbun (newspaper)
- Publication date: 1912
- Publication place: Japan
- English publication date: 1967
- Media type: Print
- Preceded by: To the Spring Equinox and Beyond
- Followed by: Kokoro

The Wayfarer (Japanese: 行人, Hepburn: Kōjin) is a 1912 novel by Japanese writer Natsume Sōseki. It is the second part of a trilogy starting with To the Spring Equinox and Beyond (1912) and ending with Kokoro (1914).

== Plot ==
Jirō, a young office worker in late Meiji era Tokyo and narrator of the novel, tells of the unhappy marriage of his older brother Ichirō, a university professor, and his wife Onao. During a family excursion to Osaka, the suspicious Ichirō asks Jirō to try Onao's fidelity by staying overnight at an inn with her in Wakayama. Jirō, reluctant at first, eventually agrees to the plan. Soon after their return, Jirō tells Ichirō that his brother has no reason to question his wife's loyalty, but Ichirō is unsatisfied with Jirō's answer and insists on further reports. Jirō evades his brother's inquiries, which strains their relationship. Weary of the growing familial tensions, Jirō decides to leave home and move into a quarter of his own. When he learns that his parents worry about Ichirō's increasingly eccentric behaviour, he persuades his brother's colleague H to take Ichirō on a holiday with him to help Ichirō regain his mental stability. While en route, H sends a long letter to Jirō in which he explains that Ichirō's nervous state is due to his being too demanding of himself and his surroundings, and to his constant aiming at the absolute.

== Publication history ==
The Wayfarer was first serialised in the Asahi Shimbun newspaper. The first three chapters, "Tomodachi" ("Friend"), "Ani" ("Brother"), and "Kaeru te kara" ("Return and after") appeared between 6 December 1912 and 17 April 1913, the final chapter "Jinrō" ("Anguish") between 16 September and 15 November 1913. The delay between chapters three and four was owed to Natsume's health issues.

== Influences ==
Miguel de Cervantes' story "El curioso impertinente", included in his novel Don Quixote, has repeatedly been cited as an influence on Natsume's novel. In this story, a nobleman tries his wife's fidelity by talking a close friend into attempting to seduce her, with tragic results.

The novel's character Ichirō repeatedly refers to the story of Paolo and his sister-in-law Francesca, two characters (based on actual persons) from Dante's Divine Comedy who are condemned to suffer in hell for committing adultery, betraying Paolo's brother and Francesca's husband Giovanni.

== English translation ==
An English translation by Beongcheon Yu was published in 1967.
