= Beongcheon Yu =

Korean translator and author (1925–2022)

Beongcheon Yu (29 December 1925 – 23 November 2022) (Korean: 유병천) was a Korean-born translator of Natsume Sōseki's novel The Wayfarer and author of a critical study on Natsume. Yu was born in Korea on 29 December 1925, a twenty-eighth generation descendent in the Yu Clan of Chungju. He was selected to attend the Dai-Ichi-Koto Gakko (the First Higher School), now part of the University of Tokyo. He graduated with his BA in French literature from Seoul National University in 1948. He received his MA from the University of Missouri-Kansas City in 1954 and his PhD in English from Brown University in 1958. Known for his critical analyses of Hemingway, Melville, Akutagawa Ryunosuke, the Korean authors Han Yong-Un and Yi Gwangsu, and the life and writings of Lafcadio Hearn, he also wrote about the impact of orientalism on western literature. He wrote a review of Herman Melville's Moby Dick, "Ishmael's Equal Eye: The Source of Balance in Moby Dick." Yu was professor emeritus in English at Wayne State University.

Yu died in Paris on 23 November 2022, at the age of 96.

== Works ==
=== Original works ===
==== English-language ====
===== Books =====
- Yu, Beongcheon (1958). An ape of gods; the art and thought of Lafcadio Hearn (Ph.D. thesis). Providence, Rhode Island: Brown University. OCLC 23760480.

Yu, Beongcheon (1964). An ape of gods; the art and thought of Lafcadio Hearn. Detroit: Wayne State University Press. LCCN 64010090. OCLC 2521170.

- Yu, Beongcheon; Nihon Eibun Gakkai [English Literary Society of Japan] (1961). Lafcadio Hearn's aesthetics of organic memory. Tokyo: [Nihon Eibungakkai]. OCLC 39468940. Reprinted from Studies in English Literature, v. 38 no. 1, November 1961.
- Yu, Beongcheon (1962). Lafcadio Hearn's twice-told legends reconsidered. OCLC 16782341. Reprinted from American Literature, vol. 34, no. 1, March 1962.
- Yu, Beongcheon (1969). Natsume Soseki. Twayne's world authors series, Japan; TWAS 99. New York: Twayne. OCLC 73184.
- Yu, Beongcheon (1972). Akutagawa: an introduction. Detroit: Wayne State University Press. ISBN 978-0-8143-1467-8. LCCN 75037579. OCLC 219733.
- Yu, Beongcheon (1974). Linda Wagner-Martin (ed.). Ernest Hemingway: Five Decades of Criticism. East Lansing: Michigan State University Press. pp. 109–131. ISBN 978-0-8701-3182-0.
- Yu, Beongcheon (1983). The Great Circle : American Writers And The Orient. Detroit: Wayne State University Press. ISBN 978-0-8143-1737-2. LCCN 83014811. OCLC 9785554.
- Yu, Beongcheon (1992). Han Yong-un & Yi Kwang-su: two pioneers of modern Korean literature. Detroit: Wayne State University Press. ISBN 978-0-8143-2354-0. LCCN 91021779. OCLC 24010135.

===== Papers =====
- Yu, Beongcheon (1965). "Ishmael's Equal Eye: The Source of Balance in Moby-Dick". ELH. 32 (1). The Johns Hopkins University Press: 110–125. doi:10.2307/2872374. JSTOR 2872374.
- Yu, Beongcheon (1967). "Lafcadio Hearn (Or Koizumi Yakumo) (1850-1904)". American Literary Realism, 1870-1910. 1 (1). University of Illinois Press: 52–55. JSTOR 27747562.
- "Literary and Art Theories in Japan by Makoto Ueda". The Journal of Aesthetics and Art Criticism. 26 (4). The American Society for Aesthetics: 540–541. 1968. doi:10.2307/428323. JSTOR 428323.
- Yu, Beongcheon (1975). "The Perspective from Korean Literature". The Journal of Asian Studies. 35 (1). Association of Asian Studies: 126–128. doi:10.2307/2054049. JSTOR 2054049. S2CID 165821377.

==== Korean-language ====
- Yu, Beongcheon (1984). Inyŏndo : Hyŏnmuk chei tanpʻyŏnjip (Korean: 因緣圖 : 玄黙第二短篇集). Sŏul Tʻŭkpyŏlsi: Chaedong Munhwasa. LCCN 86145148. OCLC 15428296. (in Korean) Short stories.
- Yu, Beongcheon (1984). Kongnyŏ : Hyŏnmuk chei hŭigokchip (Korean: 貢女 : 玄默第二戲曲集). Sŏul Tʻŭkpyŏlsi: Chaedong Munhwasa. LCCN 86178066. OCLC 18869609. (in Korean) Plays.
- Yu, Beongcheon (1992). Aebigeil: Yu Pyŏng-chʻŏn changpʻyŏn sosŏl (Korean: 애비게일 : 유병천장편소설). Sŏul-si: Ŭryu Munhwasa. ISBN 978-89-324-7034-4. LCCN 98452169. OCLC 32758598. (in Korean)

=== Translations ===
- Sōseki, Natsume (1967). Kōjin [The wayfarer]. Trans. with an introd. by Beongcheon Yu. Detroit: Wayne State University Press. ISBN 978-0-8143-1318-3. LCCN 66026974. OCLC 1039994.

Reprinted 1969 by C. E. Tuttle (Tokyo). ISBN 978-4-8053-0204-0. LCCN 76446909. OCLC 813492505.
Reprinted 1982 by Putnam (New York). ISBN 978-0-399-50612-3. LCCN 81015429. OCLC 7837743.
