= Jun Etō =

Japanese literary critic

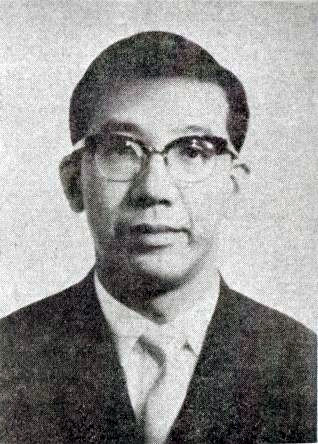
- Etō in 1965
- Born: 25 December 1932; Tokyo Japan
- Died: 21 July 1999 (aged 66); Kamakura, Kanagawa Japan
- Occupations: Writer, literary critic
- Writing career
- Genre: Literary criticism

Atsuo Egashira (江頭 淳夫, Egashira Atsuo; 25 December 1932 – 21 July 1999), known by his pen name Jun Etō (江藤 淳, Etō Jun), was a Japanese writer and literary critic active in the Shōwa and early Heisei periods.

== Early life ==
Etō was born in the Shinjuku district of Tokyo; his father was a banker, and his grandfather (originally from Saga in Kyūshū) was an admiral in the Imperial Japanese Navy. His mother died when he was four years old, and always sickly as a child, he was mostly educated at home. He had an interest in literature from an early age, ranging from the heavy works of Jun'ichirō Tanizaki and Fyodor Dostoevsky, to the comics of Suihō Tagawa. In 1942, he was sent to boarding school in Kamakura, Kanagawa prefecture. While in Kamakura, his family's house in Tokyo was destroyed during the American air raids.

In the immediate postwar era, he went to high school in Fujisawa, Kanagawa prefecture, where he developed a friendship with future Tokyo governor Shintaro Ishihara, who was one year ahead of him. He later returned to Tokyo, and eventually graduated from Keio University with a degree in English literature. Etō moved from Kamakura to the Ichigaya neighborhood in central Tokyo in 1948, returning to live in Kamakura from 1980 to his death.

== Literary career ==
Although hired as a professor at the Tokyo Institute of Technology, Etō devoted most of his time and efforts into literature, and published his first work, Natsume Sōseki ron (1955), a critique of the famous Japanese writer Natsume Sōseki, which won the Noma Literary Prize and the Kikuchi Kan Prize. He followed this with Dorei no shisō wo haisu (1958) and Sakka ha kōdō suru (1959), in which he argued that a writer's style was directly related to his personal behavior and background.

In 1958, Etō joined a group of young, left-wing writers, artists and composers to form the "Young Japan Society" (Wakai Nihon no Kai) for the purpose of protesting a draconian Police Duties Bill introduced by conservative prime minister Nobusuke Kishi that would have authorized police use of warrantless searches and seizures against left-wing activists. Etō and the Young Japan Society later participated in the massive Anpo protests against Kishi's effort to revise the U.S.-Japan Security Treaty from 1959 to 1960.

In 1962, he published Kobayashi Hideo ronshū, in which he dared to write a critique on the famous literary critic Kobayashi Hideo. This work was awarded the Shichosha Literary Prize. Shortly afterwards, he departed for the United States for two years, for advanced studies at Princeton University at the invitation of the Rockefeller Foundation.

Other works include Ichizoku saikai (1967–1972) in which he attempted to trace his family roots and at the same time, the roots of the Japanese people.

Etō was a very prolific author, and his books and essays ranged from literary criticism and to postwar political commentary; through taking controversial viewpoints, he also established himself as one of foremost public intellectuals in the print and television. He was initially a prominent member of the movement against the Treaty of Mutual Cooperation and Security between the United States and Japan, establishing the "Young Japan Society" with like-minded writers and intellectuals, although he later reversed his position after a revised version of the treaty was ratified, accusing his former colleagues of "intellectual bankruptcy" and of confusing politics with morality.

Etō especially drew controversy during the mid-1960s when he produced a series of essays after his return from Princeton, which indicated a shift to the far right end of the political spectrum. He was highly critical of the policies of the American occupation, which he felt had destroyed or subverted Japanese traditions. He was especially critical of the post-war Constitution of Japan, which he asserted was a foreign import imposed upon Japan which needed revision, if not replacement.

In 1970, Etō completed Umi ga Yomigaeru, a work on the Russo-Japanese War, which (in August 1977) was made into the first three-hour historical drama to be aired on Japanese television.

In 1975, he submitted a doctoral dissertation entitled Sōseki to Āsā-Ō densetsu ("Sōseki and the Arthurian Legend") to Keiō University, and received his doctoral degree. The dissertation was a literary criticism of Kairo-kō: A Dirge and he argued that Soseki's own love affair was reflected in the plot.

He was awarded the Japan Art Academy Award in the same year and in 1991, became a member of the Japan Art Academy. From 1994, he was an honorary chairman of the Japan Writer's Association and was on the judging committees for many of Japan's literary awards.

On 21 July 1999, Etō committed suicide at his home in Kamakura by cutting his left wrist. He had been depressed by the death of his wife due to cancer the previous year, and by a stroke which he had suffered, which made writing difficult. His funeral was held per Shinto rites, and his grave is at the Aoyama Cemetery in Tokyo.

== Selected bibliography ==
- Eto, Jun. Natsume Sōseki ronshu. Kawade Shobo Shinsha. ISBN 4-309-60931-7. (in Japanese)
- Eto, Jun. A Nation Reborn: A short history of postwar Japan. International Society for Educational Information (1974). ASIN: B0006D99OO
- Eto, Jun. Closed Linguistic Space: Censorship by the Occupation Forces and Postwar Japan. Japan Publishing Industry Foundation for Culture (2020). ISBN 978-4-86658-114-9.

== See also ==
- Japanese literature
- List of Japanese authors
