= Light and Darkness (novel) =

1916 novel by Natsume Sōseki

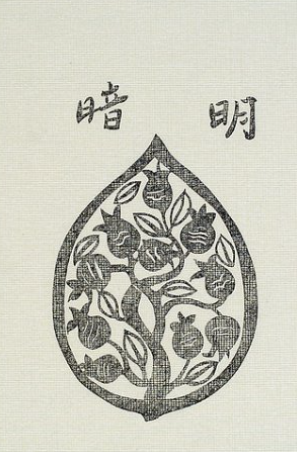
- Light and Darkness (1916)
- Author: Natsume Sōseki
- Original title: Meian
- Translators: V. H. Viglielmo; John Nathan
- Illustrator: Natori Shunsen
- Language: Japanese
- Published: 1916
- Publisher: Asahi Shimbun (newspaper); Iwanami Shoten (book)
- Publication place: Japan
- English publication date: 1971, 2014
- Media type: Print

Light and Darkness or Light and Dark (明暗, Meian) is a 1916 Japanese novel by Natsume Sōseki. It was his last novel and unfinished at the time of his death.

== Plot ==
O-Nobu suspects that her husband, Tsuda, loves another woman and tries to find the truth. Tsuda, who cannot forget his former lover, Kiyoko, goes to a hospital for a minor operation. O-Nobu visits her and her husband's relatives for extra financial support, since the couple are extravagant. Kobayashi, an unemployed former friend, visits Tsuda and threatens that if he does not treat him well, he will reveal Tsuda's past to O-Nobu. Kobayashi also visits O-Nobu, but nothing happens. Tsuda's sister visits him and tries to make him realize how he should act towards his parents. Mrs. Yoshikawa, the wife of Tsuda's boss, also visits him and tries to make him change his attitudes. She sends him away to an onsen where Tsuda meets Kiyoko, who is now married to another man.

== Publication history ==
Mei An was first published in daily serialized installments in the Tokyo and Osaka editions of the Asahi Shimbun, beginning on 16 May 1916 and ending on 14 December the same year. It was the ninth and last of Sōseki's novels to be serialized by the newspaper. In a letter to the paper's editor, Natsume explained that because of his illness — a combination of bleeding ulcers, intestinal catarrh, and hemorrhoids — he had begun work on the novel only a week before the serialization was scheduled to begin. He also remarked that he was able to complete nine installments before the serialization was published, a lead he managed to maintain.

The writing of the novel became increasingly problematic for Sōseki as his illness worsened over the year. On 16 November, Sōseki confided to a pupil the toll that the writing of the novel was taking on him: "It troubles me that Mei An gets longer and longer. I'm still writing. I'm sure this will continue into the new year." By 21 November Sōseki had become too ill to continue work on the novel. He died on 9 December, leaving the novel unfinished. In total, 188 installments had been completed; a manuscript with the number "189" written in the upper right corner was found on his desk after his death. The following year, Iwanami Shoten published the 188 installments in book form. Despite being incomplete, the novel is the longest work Sōseki ever wrote, being over 200 pages longer than his I Am a Cat and approximately twice the length of his other novels.

== Open ending ==
The novel's unfinished state has led to a variety of speculations regarding its possible ending. While Kusatao Nakamura predicted Tsuda's and Kiyoko's falling in love again, resulting in the grieving O-Nobu's suicide, Kenzaburō Ōe and Shōhei Ōoka saw a reunion of husband and wife after a crisis-inflicted illness of either O-Nobu (Ōe's version) or Tsuda (Ōoka' version) and their recovery with their partner's help. In addition, four possible endings have been written and published by Mitsuki Kumegawa, Fumiko Tanaka, Minae Mizumura, and Ai Nagai. In his introduction to his 2014 translation, John Nathan argued that, although Natsume was not able to finish his novel, it does not have to be viewed as incomplete: "The details of the ending are missing, but the essence of his [Natsume's] conclusion is already encoded in the text: Tsuda will not succeed in liberating himself from the egoism that blinds him, and O-Nobu will continue to pursue an exalted version of love that she will not ultimately attain." (Nathan) In his new afterword to his 2011 revised translation (original 1971), V. H. Viglielmo supported this view, referring to the majority of critics who agreed that "although incomplete, it can with considerable justification be viewed as a finished work of art."

== English translations ==
Light and Darkness has been translated into English twice, first by V. H. Viglielmo in 1971 and by John Nathan (titled Light and Dark) in 2014. John Nathan's translation includes the illustrations by Natori Shunsen that were published with the novel's initial publication in the Asahi Shimbun.
