= Nowaki (novel) =

1907 novel by Natsume Sōseki

- Author: Natsume Sōseki
- Original title: 野分 (Nowaki)
- Translator: William Ridgeway
- Language: Japanese
- Publication date: 1907
- Publication place: Japan
- English publication date: 2011
- Media type: Print (Paperback)
- ISBN: 978-1-929280-68-1

Nowaki (野分 Nowaki) is a short Japanese novel by Natsume Sōseki (1867–1916). Written in 1907, the novel was published in the magazine Hototogisu in January. The year 1907 was a turning point in the author's life when he left his Tokyo University teaching position to write full-time for the daily Asahi Shimbun. He also serialized the novel Gubijinsō (虞美人草) the same year.

== Plot ==
Nowaki is about three men, all of whom are writers. Two of the younger men, the tubercular Takayanagi and the dandy Nakano, were close in their student days, and are now recent university graduates making their way in the world. The older man of the three is known as Dōya-sensei (Master Dōya), once a teacher in the provinces who was forced to leave his post by villagers and students angered over his disrespectful attitude toward wealth and authority, now pursuing in Tokyo a career as an editor and writer, but barely eking out a livelihood, much to his wife's consternation. Magazine editor by day, he longs to finish and publish his more serious writing, "Essay on Character." By sheer coincidence, the three lives come together over the sum of one hundred yen (about a month's salary at the time): Nakano's gift to Takayanagi to convalesce at a seaside hot springs, Dōya-sensei's debts which are paid off with the purchase of his manuscript, and Takayangi's act of self-sacrifice and redemption.

== Criticism ==
Thematically, Nowaki is linked to The Two Hundred Tenth Day (二百十日 Nihyaku-tōka), the short, lightweight work it follows, and to Gubijinsō, an overwrought melodramatic tragedy of a young woman unable to succeed in a man's world. Nowaki and Gubijinsō are the most moralistic and didactic of Sōseki's works of fiction, but they also received public and critical acclaim.

Nowaki has much in common with Mori Ōgai's short story Youth (青年 Seinen), in which Sōseki appears as a character named Hirata Fuseki, who lectures on literature and intellectual life.

Modern tastes may find Nowaki contrived, but it was considered by some to be the best novel of 1907. Jim Reichert's analysis of the text can be found in "The Love That Dare Not Speak Its Name: Male-Male Desire in Natsume Sōseki’s Nowaki,” in his book In the Company of Men: Representations of Male-Male Sexuality in Meiji Literature. Angela Yiu has a chapter on Nowaki in her book Chaos and Order in the Works of Natsume Sôseki.

== See also ==
- Donald Keene
