= I Am a Cat =

Satirical 1905–1906 novel by Natsume Sōseki

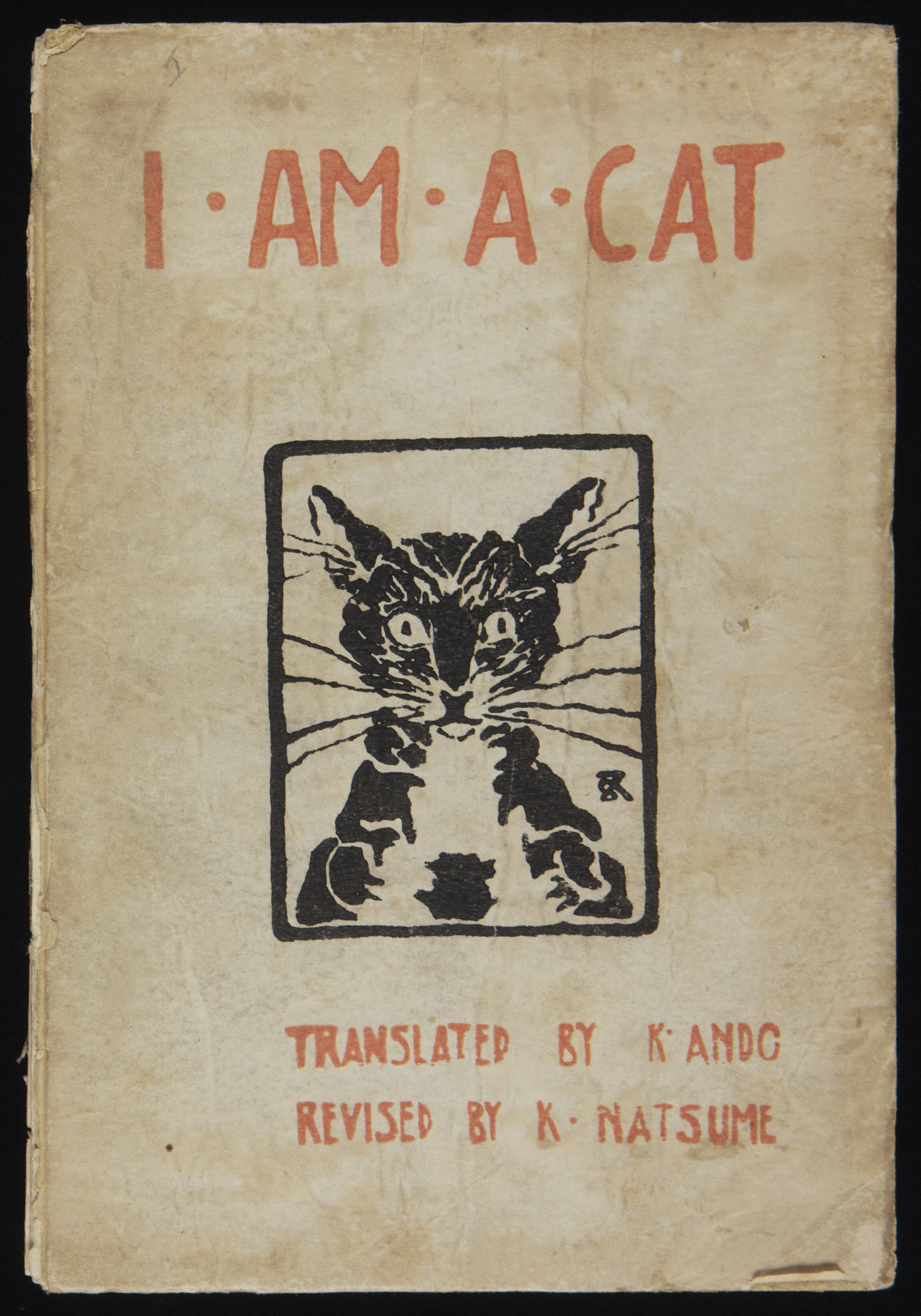
- Cover of the 1906 English translation
- Author: Natsume Sōseki
- Original title: Wagahai wa Neko de Aru (吾輩は猫である)
- Translator: Aiko Ito and Graeme Wilson
- Language: Japanese
- Genre: Satirical novel
- Publication date: 1905–1906
- Publication place: Japan
- English publication date: 1961 by Kenkyusha
- Media type: Print (hardback & paperback)
- ISBN: 978-0-8048-3265-6
- OCLC: 49703480
- LC Class: PL812.A8 W313 2002

I Am a Cat (Japanese: 吾輩は猫である, Hepburn: Wagahai wa Neko de Aru) is a satirical novel written in 1905–1906 by Natsume Sōseki about Japanese society during the Meiji period (1868–1912), particularly the uneasy mix of Western culture and Japanese traditions.

Sōseki's title, Wagahai wa Neko de Aru, uses a very high-register phrasing more appropriate to a nobleman, conveying grandiloquence and self-importance. This is somewhat ironic, since the speaker, an anthropomorphized domestic cat, is a regular house cat of a teacher, and not of a high-ranking noble as the manner of speech suggests, an example of Sōseki's love for droll writing.

The book was first published in ten installments in the literary journal Hototogisu. At first, Sōseki intended only to write the short story that constitutes the first chapter of I Am a Cat. However, Takahama Kyoshi, one of the editors of Hototogisu, persuaded Sōseki to serialize the work, which evolved stylistically as the installments progressed. Nearly all the chapters can stand alone as discrete works.

== Plot summary ==
In I Am a Cat, a supercilious, feline narrator describes the lives of an assortment of middle-class Japanese people: Mr. Sneaze ("sneeze" is misspelled on purpose, but literally translated from Chinno Kushami (珍野苦沙彌), in the original Japanese) and family (the cat's owners), Sneaze's garrulous and irritating friend Waverhouse (迷亭, Meitei), and the young scholar Avalon Coldmoon (水島寒月, Mizushima Kangetsu) with his will-he-won't-he courtship of the businessman's spoiled daughter, Opula Goldfield (金田富子, Kaneda Tomiko).

== Cultural impact ==
I Am a Cat is a frequent assignment to Japanese schoolchildren, such that the plot and style remain well-known long after publication. One effect was that the narrator's manner of speech, which was archaic even at the time of writing, became largely associated with the cat and the book. The narrator's preferred personal pronoun, wagahai, is rarely-to-never used in real life in Japan, but survives in fiction thanks to the book, generally for arrogant and pompous anthropomorphized animals. For example, Bowser, the turtle-king enemy in many Mario video games, uses wagahai, as does Morgana, a cat character in Persona 5. Furthermore, the 2023 anime The Masterful Cat Is Depressed Again Today uses the complete title, directly captioned on screen, bordered in paw prints, as its opening line, spoken by the titular character. Uchida Hyakken uses that title in his 1950 novel Gansaku wagahai wa neko de aru (贋作吾輩は猫である) and Okuizumi Hikaru in his 1996 crime fiction Wagahai wa neko de aru satsujin jiken (『吾輩は猫である』殺人事件).

== Adaptations ==
The novel was first adapted into a film released in 1936. The film's setting was moved to the end of WWI and the ending was changed to be less nihilistic. Later, prolific screenwriter Toshio Yasumi adapted the novel into a screenplay, and a second film was directed by Kon Ichikawa. It premiered in Japanese cinemas in 1975. An anime television special adaptation aired in 1982. It was also adapted into a manga by Chiroru Kobato in 2010 and translated into English by Zack Davisson.
