= Ten Nights of Dreams =

1908 novel by Natsume Sōseki

- Author: Natsume Sōseki
- Original title: 夢十夜 (Yume jūya)
- Language: Japanese
- Genre: Short Story
- Publisher: Asahi Shimbun
- Publication date: 1908
- Publication place: Japan

Ten Nights of Dreams (夢十夜, Yume Jūya) or Ten Nights' Dreams is a series of short pieces by Natsume Sōseki. It was published in the Asahi Shimbun from July 25 to August 5, 1908.

Sōseki writes of ten dreams set in various time periods, including his own time (the Meiji period) and as far back as the "age of the gods," and the Kamakura period. Four of the ten dreams begin with the phrase "This is what I saw in my dream" (こんな夢を見た Konna yume o mita).

== Summaries of the Dreams ==
The First Night

The dreamer sits at the bedside of a woman who says she is dying. Because of the warm color in her lips and cheeks, he questions, several times, if she truly is dying. After confirming that she must indeed die, the woman asks a favor. After she dies, he should dig her grave with a large shell, mark it with a fragment of fallen star, and wait at its side a hundred years for her return. The dreamer prepares her grave and buries her as requested. Then he begins his vigil, losing count of the days as years go by. As he begins to wonder if she didn't deceive him, a slender stem emerges and a white lily blossoms before him. He touches his lips to a dewdrop on the lily and knows in that moment that a hundred years have passed.

The Second Night

The dreamer, who is staying in a temple, returns to his chamber after leaving the high priest's quarters. He settles himself and reaches under his seating cushion to confirm the presence of a dagger. Then, he reflects on his exchange with the high priest. The priest had scorned him for his years of failure in attaining enlightenment. No true samurai, the priest had said, would succumb so to failure. The dreamer decides he must take either the priest's life or his own, that very evening, when the clock strikes the next hour. If he succeeds in attaining enlightenment, then the priest will pay. If not, then he will commit seppuku. He struggles mightily to find “nothingness.” His struggle turns to frustration and then to anger. As he struggles without success, the clock strikes the hour.

The Third Night

The dreamer is walking at dusk with a six-year-old child on his back. He believes the child is his own, and he knows that the child is blind and that its head is shaved. However, he does not know when the child lost its sight or why its head is shaved. Despite its blindness, the child seems to know where they are and where they are going. Its voice is childlike, but its words are mature. The dreamer grows ill at ease, and he resolves to abandon the child in the woods up ahead. As they enter the woods, the child directs the dreamer to the base of a cedar tree. The child states that he was killed by the dreamer, in this very place, on a similar night, a hundred years before. The dreamer remembers the night, and at the same moment the child grows heavy as stone.

The Fourth Night

An old man sits alone at a large table in an earthen-floored room, escaping the heat of the day. He drinks saké and converses enigmatically with the proprietress. When he departs, the dreamer, who is a young child, follows him to a willow where children are playing. The old man produces a towel and tells them to watch it become a snake. He blows a whistle and circles with dance-like steps, but the towel remains a towel. Finally, he puts the towel into his box and walks on, still insisting it will change. They reach the riverbank, but the old man doesn't stop. The dreamer watches him wade in, still hoping to see the snake when he emerges on the other bank. The old man, however, disappears beneath the surface and does not reappear.

The Fifth Night

The dreamer is defeated in battle and captured alive. Brought before the enemy general, he chooses death over capitulation. However, he requests to look one last time on the woman he loves before dying. The enemy general gives him until daybreak, when the cock crows, to summon his woman. The woman mounts her unsaddled white horse and races through the night, black hair streaming behind her. Suddenly, she hears the crowing of a cock from the darkened roadside and loses hope. When the cock crows a second time, she releases the taut reins, and horse and woman tumble into a deep canyon. The crowing of the cock was in fact Amanojaku, a mischievous goddess, who from that moment on is the dreamer's eternal nemesis.

The Sixth Night

The dreamer hears that Unkei is carving Niō guardians at the main gate of Gokoku-ji. He stops to see, and joins a large crowd of onlookers. Unkei, dressed in Kamakura attire, is suspended high up on the work, carving away industriously, oblivious to the crowd below. The dreamer wonders how Unkei can still be living in the modern Meiji era. At the same time, he watches in awe, transfixed by Unkei's skill with mallet and chisel. A fellow observer explains that Unkei is not really shaping a Niō, but rather liberating the Niō that lies buried in the wood. That's why he never errs. On hearing this, the dreamer rushes home to try for himself. He chisels through an entire pile of oak, but finds no Niō. He concludes, in the end, that Meiji wood is hiding no Niō. That's why Unkei is still living.

The Seventh Night

The dreamer finds himself on a large ship that is steaming and sailing through the waves at great speed. There are many crew members and fellow passengers, but the dreamer has no comrade or compatriot. He also has no idea where the ship is headed or when he might next set foot on dry land. He becomes terribly discouraged by his situation, and finally decides to throw himself into the sea and end it all. One evening, in an hour when the deck is deserted, he jumps overboard. As he plummets toward the dark sea below, he is seized by fear and regret. He knows with certainty now, for the first time, that he should have remained on board.

The Eighth Night

The dreamer enters a barber shop and seats himself in front of a mirror. In the mirror, he can observe the window behind him and the activity in the street beyond. He sees Shōtarō, in his Panama hat, with a new woman. He sees a tofu vendor, blowing on his bugle, and a disheveled geisha not yet made up. His barber asks if he has seen the goldfish seller, and the dreamer replies that he has not. The dreamer next hears someone pounding rice cakes, but only the sounds, and not the sight, reach him. Then he notices a woman behind the latticework counting bills. When he turns around, the counting room is empty. Leaving the barber shop, the dreamer sees the goldfish seller and observes him. All the while, though, the man remains motionless.

The Ninth Night

The dream is set in a world that has somehow become unsettled. A mother and her two-year-old child await the return of the father, a samurai, who set out in the middle of a moonless night and didn't return. In the evenings, the mother walks to the shrine of Hachiman, the god of archery and war, to pray for her husband's safe return. She carries the child on her back. After praying by the iron bell, she paces a hundred times between shrine and gate, offering a prayer on each round. The father, for whom the mother so diligently prays, has died long ago at the hands of a rōnin. This dream, the dreamer reveals, was told to him by his mother in a dream.

The Tenth Night

Ken-san reports to the dreamer that Shōtarō has returned after seven days’ absence and taken to his bed with a fever. Shōtarō (who appeared briefly in the 8th night's dream) is a good and honest fellow. However, he does have a peculiar pastime. In the evenings, he dons his prized Panama hat, sits in the shopfront of the fruit market, and admires the passing women. One evening, an exquisitely attired woman approached the market and bought the biggest basket of fruit. The basket was too heavy for her to handle, so Shōtarō gallantly offered to carry it to her home. They left the shop together, and that's how Shōtarō went missing. On finally returning, Shōtarō tells his story. The woman took him on a long train ride to the mountains, and they disembarked onto a wide, grassy plain. They walked through the grass to the edge of a precipice, where the woman asked him to jump. When he declined to jump, he was accosted by countless pigs trying to lick him. He knocked pig after pig off the edge with taps of his cane, but after seven days his strength gave out, a pig licked him, and he collapsed on the spot. Shōtarō's prognosis is not good. Ken-san, who warns against the evils of excessive woman watching, will likely be the recipient of Shōtarō's prized Panama hat.

== Film adaptation ==
A Japanese film called Yume Jūya (ユメ十夜) premiered in 2006. The film is a collection of ten vignettes made by eleven directors (two worked together) ranging from industry veterans to novices. The movie was released by Cinema Epoch in October 2008.

- The First Dream

Director: Akio Jissoji
Screenwriter: Kuze Teruhiko
Stars: Kyōko Koizumi, Matsuo Suzuki, and Minori Terada

- The Second Dream

Director: Kon Ichikawa
Screenwriter: Kokuji Yanagi
Stars: Tsuyoshi Ujiki and Nakamura Umenosuke

- The Third Dream

Director: Takashi Shimizu
Stars: Keisuke Horibe and Yuu Kashii

- The Fourth Dream

Director: Atsushi Shimizu
Screenwriter: Shin'ichi Inotsume
Stars: Koji Yamamoto and Toru Shinagawa

- The Fifth Dream

Director & Screenwriter: Keisuke Toyoshima
Stars: Mikako Ichikawa and Koji Ōkura

- The Sixth Dream

Director & Screenwriter: Matsuo Suzuki
Stars: Sadao Abe, TOZAWA and Yoshizumi Ishihara

- The Seventh Dream

Directors: Yoshitaka Amano and Masaaki Kawahara
Stars: Sascha and Fumika Hideshima

- The Eighth Dream

Director: Nobuhiro Yamashita
Screenwriter: Kenichiro Nagao
Stars: Hiroshi Fujioka and Hiroshi Yamamoto

- The Ninth Dream

Director & Screenwriter: Miwa Nishikawa
Stars: Tamaki Ogawa and Pierre Taki

- The Tenth Dream

Director: Yūdai Yamaguchi
Screenwriters: Yuudai Yamaguchi and Junya Katō
Character Design: MAN☆GATARO
Stars: Kenichi Matsuyama, Manami Honjō, Kōji Ishizaka, and Yasuda Dai Circus

- Prologue and Epilogue

Director: Atsushi Shimizu
Stars: Erika Toda

== See also ==
- Dreams (1990), a film by Akira Kurosawa
