= Kusamakura (novel) =

1906 novel by Natsume Sōseki

- Cover of the 1965 English translation
- Author: Natsume Sōseki
- Original title: Kusamakura (草枕)
- Language: Japanese
- Genre: Novel
- Publication date: 1906
- Publication place: Japan

Kusamakura (草枕, Kusamakura (Note: Japanese pronunciation: [kɯ̥.sa.maꜜ.kɯ.ɾa], lit. 'Grass Pillow', transl. sleeping on grass; overnight sleep on a journey; journey. This is originally a makurakotoba.)) is a Japanese novel by Natsume Sōseki published in 1906. An English translation by Alan Turney was published in 1965 with the title The Three-Cornered World. Other translations have been published with variations of the original Japanese title, which means "grass pillow" and has connotations of travel.

== Plot ==
The novel tells of an artist who retreats to the mountains, where he stays at a remote, almost deserted hotel. There he becomes intrigued by the mysterious hostess, O-Nami, who reminds him of the John Everett Millais painting Ophelia.

Ostensibly looking for subjects to paint, the artist makes only a few sketches, but instead writes poetry. This poetry is inserted into a text that consists of scenes from the artist's reclusive life and essay-like meditations on art and the artist's position in society. In these musings, the artist quotes and mentions a variety of Japanese, Chinese and European painters, poets, and novelists. For example, he discusses the difference between painting and poetry as argued in Gotthold Ephraim Lessing's Laocoon: An Essay on the Limits of Painting and Poetry. Other writers and poets referred to include Wang Wei, Tao Yuanming, Bashō, Laurence Sterne (Tristram Shandy), Oscar Wilde (The Critic as Artist), and Henrik Ibsen.

Chapter 12 contains an apology for the death of Sōseki's student Misao Fujimura, who committed suicide by drowning. Calling his death heroic, the narrator asserts: "That youth gave his life – a life which should not be surrendered – for all that is implicit in the one word 'poetry'."

== English translations and titles ==
Kusamakura was first translated into English by Umeji Sasaki in 1927 as Kusamakura and Buncho; in the same year, another English translation of Kusamakura was made by Kazutomo Takahashi, who added "Unhuman Tour" as a subtitle to the work.

With Natsume Sōseki considered culturally "celebrated," Kusamakura was later translated into English in 1965 by Alan Turney under the title The Three-Cornered World. Turney himself explained his choice of the title in the introduction to his translation:

Kusa Makura literally means The Grass Pillow, and is the standard phrase used in Japanese poetry to signify a journey. Since a literal translation of this title would give none of the connotations of the original to English readers, I thought it better to take a phrase from the body of the text which I believe expresses the point of the book.

The phrase from the book to which Turney refers is (in his own translation):

...I suppose you could say that an artist is a person who lives in the triangle which remains after the angle which we may call common sense has been removed from this four-cornered world.

A new English translation of the book by Meredith McKinney was published in 2008 under a translation of the original title Kusamakura. Explaining her choice of the title in an introduction, McKinney notes the connotation of The Grass Pillow in Japanese as a term for travel that is "redolent of the kind of poetic journey epitomized by Bashō's Narrow Road to the Deep North."
