= Natsume Sōseki =

Japanese novelist (1867–1916)

Natsume Sōseki 夏目漱石
- Sōseki on 13 September 1912, the day of Emperor Meiji's funeral
- Born: Natsume Kinnosuke; 9 February 1867; Edo, Musashi Province, Japan
- Died: 9 December 1916 (aged 49); Tokyo, Empire of Japan
- Resting place: Zōshigaya Cemetery
- Education: Tokyo Imperial University; University College London
- Occupation: Writer
- Spouse: Natsume Kyōko (m. 1896)
- Children: 7 (2 died in infancy)
- Writing career
- Genres: Novel; poetry; essay
- Notable works: Kokoro, Botchan, I Am a Cat

Japanese name
- Kanji: 夏目 漱石
- Hiragana: なつめ そうせき
- Katakana: ナツメ ソウセキ
Transcriptions
- Romanization: Natsume Sōseki

Natsume Sōseki (/ˈsoʊsɛki/; Japanese: 夏目 漱石; born Natsume Kinnosuke (夏目 金之助); (Note: Most Japanese authors are referred to by their family name, but Sōseki is usually referred to as "Sōseki", both in English-speaking and Japanese-speaking circles.) 9 February 1867 – 9 December 1916) was a Japanese novelist, poet, and scholar. He is considered one of the greatest writers in modern Japanese history and is often called the first modern novelist of Japan. Sōseki's fiction explored themes of individualism, loneliness, and the conflict between traditional Japanese values and the rapid Westernization of the Meiji era. His major works include I Am a Cat (1905), Botchan (1906), Sanshirō (1908), Kokoro (1914), and his unfinished final novel Light and Dark (1916).

Born on the cusp of the Meiji Restoration, Sōseki had a turbulent childhood, having been given up for adoption twice. He graduated from Tokyo Imperial University and became a scholar of English literature. In 1900, he was sent by the Japanese government to study in London, where he spent two miserable years marked by poverty, racial alienation, and a severe nervous breakdown. Upon his return to Japan, he succeeded Lafcadio Hearn as a lecturer in English literature at Tokyo Imperial University. In 1905, he achieved fame with the publication of the satirical novel I Am a Cat. This success prompted him to begin a prolific writing career, and in 1907, he resigned from his university post to become a full-time author for the Asahi Shimbun newspaper, a move that marked the birth of the professional artist in modern Japan.

For the rest of his life, Sōseki published a novel a year while also writing poetry and literary criticism. His work is characterized by its psychological depth, its blend of humor and pessimism, and its exploration of the human ego. Throughout his adult life, he suffered from severe stomach ulcers and recurring bouts of mental illness, including paranoid delusions, which deeply affected his work and personal life. Sōseki died from complications of his stomach condition in 1916 at the age of 49, leaving his final novel, Light and Dark, unfinished. His influence on Japanese literature is profound, and he remains one of the country's most beloved and widely read authors. His portrait appeared on the 1,000-yen banknote from 1984 to 2004.

== Early life ==
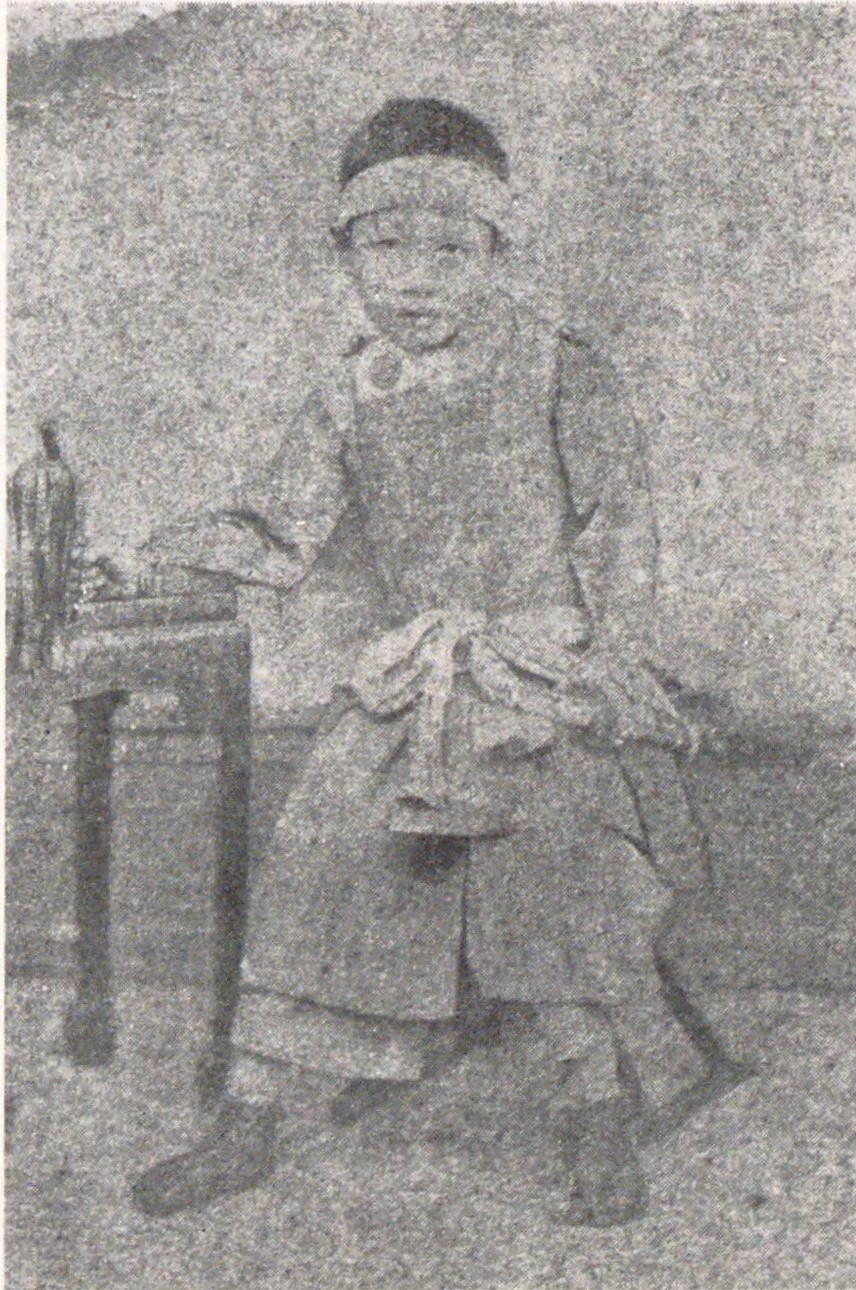
Sōseki, c. 1873

Natsume Kinnosuke was born on 9 February 1867 in the town of Edo (present-day Tokyo), the youngest of eight children. His father, Naokatsu, held the hereditary position of nanushi (neighborhood magistrate), a prestigious and well-remunerated administrative post. However, Sōseki was born on the eve of the Meiji Restoration, a period of social upheaval that led to the abolition of his father's post and a decline in the family's fortunes. Sōseki's parents, aged fifty-one and forty-one at his birth, were ashamed of having a child so late in life and considered him an unwelcome burden.

Shortly after his birth, he was put up for adoption. His first foster parents were a couple who bought and sold used goods; Sōseki later wrote that they would leave him unattended in a basket at a nighttime bazaar. He was soon returned to his family after one of his sisters found him and brought him home. In 1870, at the age of four, he was adopted again by a childless couple, Shiobara Shōnosuke and his wife Yasu. The Shiobaras instilled in the young Kinnosuke that they were his real parents. At age six, he contracted smallpox, which left his nose and cheeks permanently scarred, a disfigurement that contributed to a sense of self-contempt throughout his life.

Sōseki lived with the Shiobaras until he was nine. His life there ended when his foster father, Shiobara, took a mistress. The ensuing domestic strife led to Shiobara leaving the house. In 1876, Sōseki's biological father, Naokatsu, reclaimed him after learning that Shiobara was planning to put the boy to work in a restaurant. Upon returning to the Natsume household, he was led to believe his parents were his grandparents. He eventually learned the truth when a maid whispered it to him one night as he lay in bed. He later recalled that his primary feeling was not one of betrayal but of happiness at the maid's act of kindness.

For years, his biological father and adoptive father engaged in a "tug-of-war" for control over him. Shiobara had legally registered Sōseki as his heir, making it difficult for Naokatsu to reclaim him fully, and Sōseki's legal status was not officially settled until he was well into early manhood. Both men likely saw the intelligent young Sōseki as an investment for their own futures. In 1888, when Sōseki was twenty-one, a formal agreement was reached. Naokatsu paid Shiobara 240 yen in compensation for "seven years of care and education", and Kinnosuke was officially re-registered as Naokatsu's fourth son. The trauma of these years left a lasting mark on Sōseki, contributing to the misanthropy and sense of alienation that pervade his writing.

== Education and early career ==
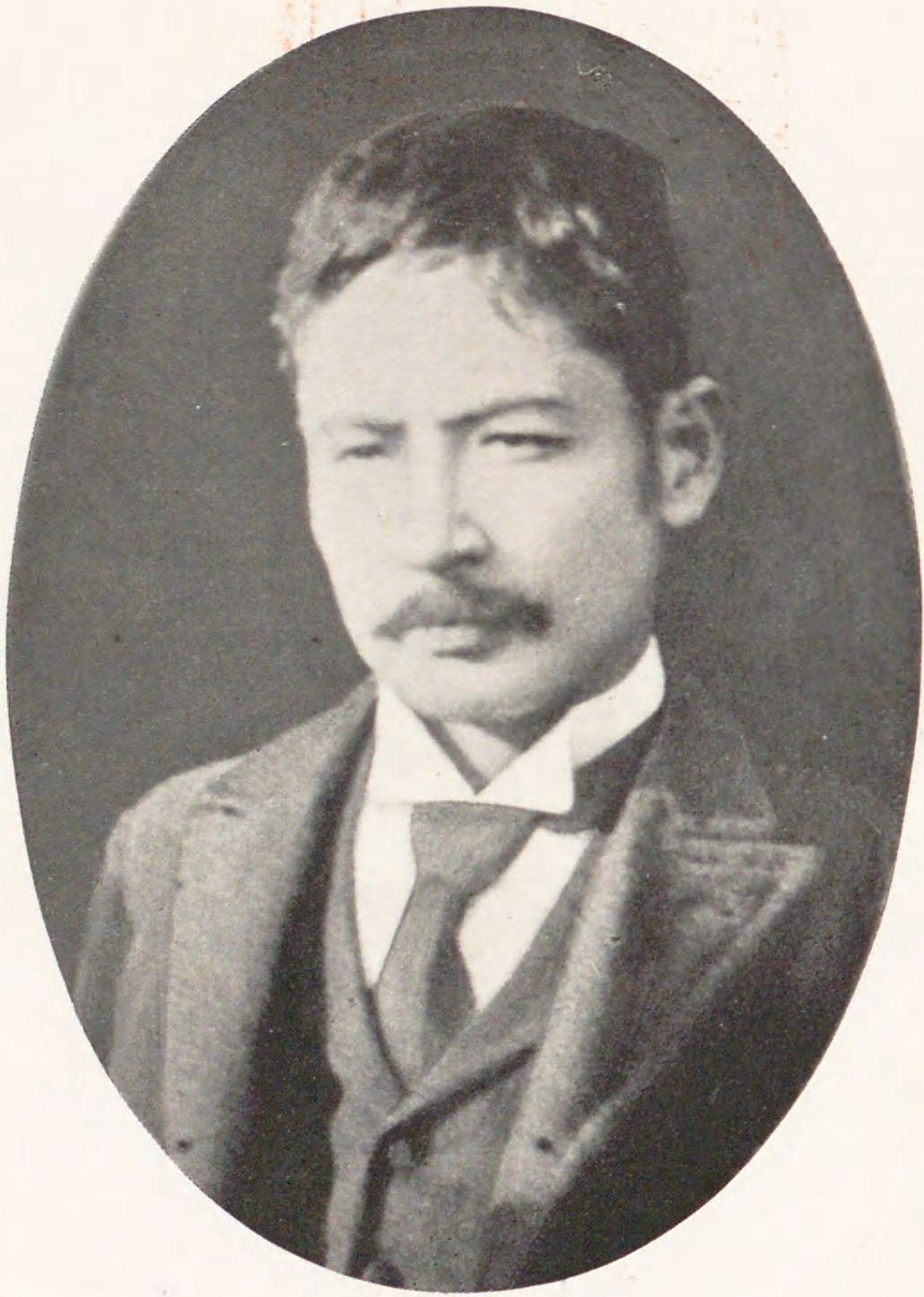
Sōseki in 1896

Sōseki's education took a meandering path. After demonstrating early academic brilliance in primary school, he entered Tokyo Metropolitan First Middle School in 1879. In his youth, his ambitions were unfixed; he thought of distinguishing himself with his knowledge of Chinese literature, then considered becoming an architect. He disliked the emphasis on English and, in 1881, dropped out without telling his parents in order to enroll in Nishō Gakusha, a traditional academy focused on classical Chinese literature. Though this course of study was against the modernizing tide of the Meiji era, it provided him with a deep command of classical Chinese that would later enrich his writing. Realizing that English was essential for advancement, he left the academy and enrolled in an English cram school in 1883.

In 1884, at age seventeen, Sōseki passed the entrance exams for the First Special Higher School (a feeder school for Tokyo Imperial University), where classes were conducted almost entirely in English. Though he often claimed to have been an indolent student, he graduated at the head of his class. During this period, he formed a lifelong friendship with Nakamura Zekō, who would later become governor of the South Manchuria Railway and a steadfast supporter. He also met and befriended the poet Masaoka Shiki, with whom he would develop his most formative literary relationship.

In 1890, Sōseki enrolled in the English department of Tokyo Imperial University. He had initially considered studying architecture but was persuaded by a friend that it would be impossible for a Japanese architect to create a work as ambitious as St Paul's Cathedral. He felt lost during his university years, later describing it as a period of "agony" in which he struggled to understand the nature of English literature from a Japanese perspective. His professors included the German philosopher Raphael von Koeber and the Scottish scholar James Main Dixon. Despite his professed confusion, he published his first substantial critical essays, including one on Walt Whitman, which created a stir on campus.

After graduating in 1893, Sōseki took up several teaching posts in Tokyo but was deeply unhappy. He felt an "insuperable gap between his life and his profession" and like a fraud, doubting his own understanding of English literature. This period of uncertainty culminated in a two-week stay at a Zen temple in Kamakura in the winter of 1894–95, though the experience failed to bring him the clarity he sought. In 1895, driven by frustration and what his wife Kyōko later described as turmoil from a broken heart, he abruptly resigned his jobs and moved to a teaching position at a middle school in Matsuyama, Shikoku, a post he took to "bury himself alive". His experiences there would later form the basis for his popular novel Botchan.

In Matsuyama, Sōseki, then a highly eligible bachelor, decided to marry. In 1895, an arranged marriage was negotiated with Nakane Kyōko, the daughter of a high-ranking government official. After a formal meeting in Tokyo, they were married in Kumamoto in June 1896, where Sōseki had taken a more prestigious position at the Fifth Higher School. Their marriage got off to a difficult start. Kyōko, raised in a wealthy household, was unprepared for domestic duties, and Sōseki was an often irascible and demanding husband. Their turbulent relationship, which lasted until Sōseki's death, was marked by periods of intense conflict, particularly during his bouts of mental illness.

== Study in London (1900–1902) ==
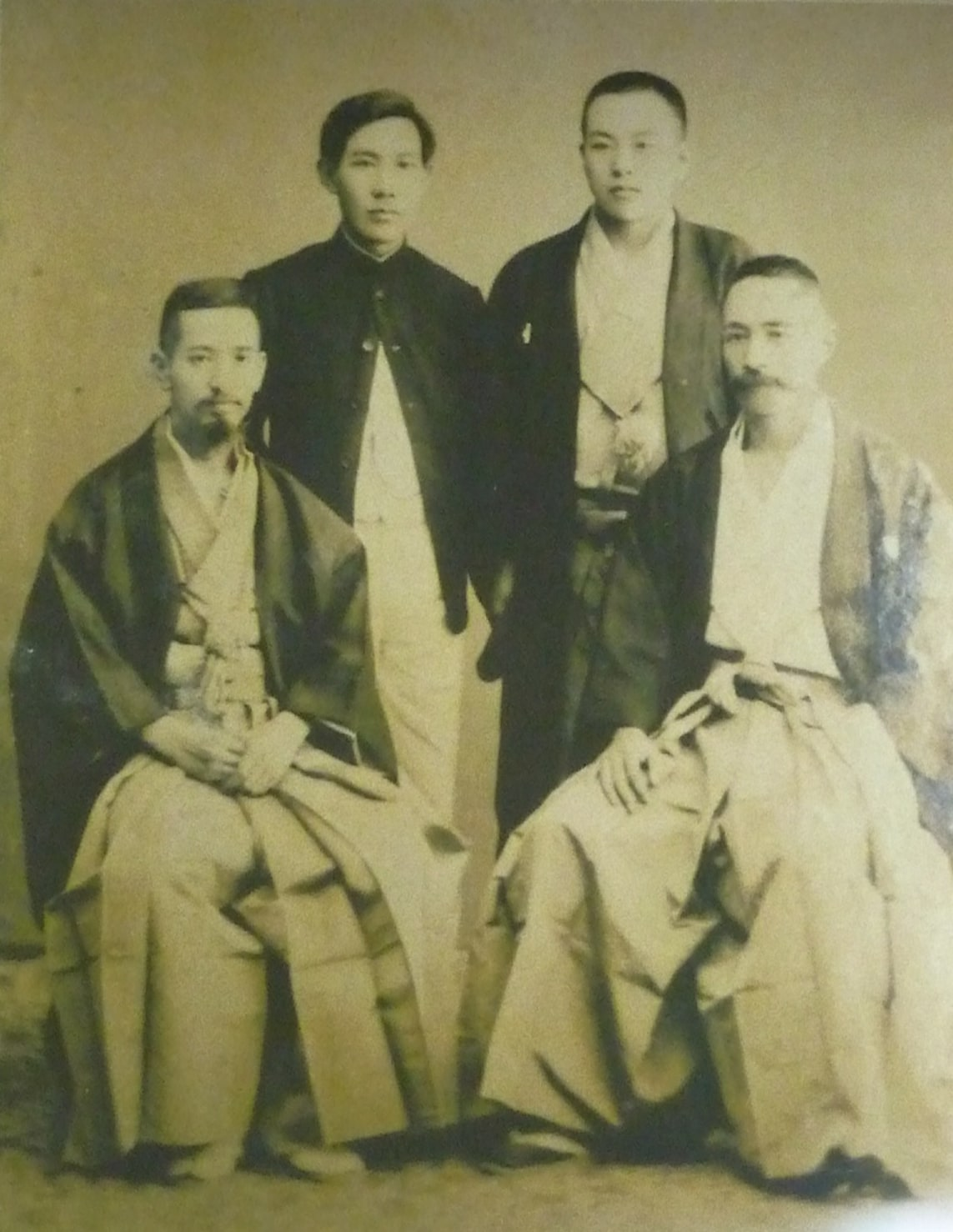
Sōseki (front right) in 1900, shortly before leaving for study in England

In 1900, the Japanese Ministry of Education ordered Sōseki to study in England for two years as the country's first English literary scholar. He was reluctant to go, worried about leaving his young family and the strain of living abroad, but as a government employee, he had no choice. He sailed from Yokohama in September 1900.

His two years in London were the most miserable of his life, a "very trying experience" that he never cared to repeat. He lived in a series of dreary boarding houses on a meager government stipend that left him constantly worried about money. He found English society cold and felt alienated as a Japanese man, writing of feeling like "a stray dog mixing with a pack of wolves". He briefly attended lectures at University College London but found them uninspiring and decided to pursue his studies independently. He hired William James Craig, a Shakespearean scholar, as a private tutor, but found his instruction disorganized. Sōseki spent most of his time reading voraciously in his room, amassing a library of some four hundred volumes.

This period marked an intense intellectual crisis, the "dark night of Sōseki's soul". Doubting the very foundations of literature, he resolved to seek a new, universal definition of what literature is, distinct from the Western concepts he felt were being imposed upon him. He launched an ambitious "ten-year plan" to examine literature from first principles, using methods from psychology, sociology, and other sciences to understand it "on my own terms." The immense intellectual pressure he placed on himself, combined with his poverty, loneliness, and paranoia, led to a severe nervous breakdown. He became reclusive, and his landladies reported to the Japanese government that he was mad. The Ministry of Education, alarmed by a telegram stating "Natsume has gone mad," ordered him to return to Japan in late 1902. While in London, he received news of the death of his close friend Masaoka Shiki, a blow that may have contributed to his collapse. Sōseki later summed up the experience: "The two years I spent in London was the most miserable time of my life."

== Literary career ==
=== Return to Tokyo and literary debut (1903–1907) ===
Sōseki returned to Japan in January 1903. His mental condition worsened upon his return. He suffered from severe paranoid delusions, accusing his family of plotting against him and flying into rages over minor noises. At one point, his wife Kyōko, pregnant with their third child, was forced to leave the house with the children for two months. Despite his mental instability, Sōseki secured a prestigious post as a lecturer in English literature at Tokyo Imperial University, succeeding Lafcadio Hearn. He was an unpopular teacher at first, his rigorous analytical approach contrasting sharply with Hearn's more literary and impressionistic style. However, his lectures on Shakespeare, begun in late 1903, proved immensely popular, with his lecture hall filled to standing room only.

In late 1904, his creative energy "exploded." At the suggestion of the poet Takahama Kyoshi, Sōseki began writing the first chapter of what would become his first novel, I Am a Cat. Published in the literary journal Hototogisu in 1905, the story, narrated by a pompous housecat who critiques the absurdities of his human master and his friends, was an immediate success. Readers clamored for more, and Sōseki expanded the story into a full-length novel serialized until 1906. The novel's wit, satirical tone, and blend of allusions to both Western and East Asian culture distinguished it from the prevailing naturalist fiction of the day. Sōseki himself later connected this burst of creative activity to his mental state, acknowledging his "indebtedness" to the "nervous breakdown and insanity" that drove him to write.

The success of I Am a Cat launched a period of extraordinary productivity. Between 1905 and 1907, while still teaching, Sōseki published several novellas and short stories, including Botchan (1906) and Kusamakura (Grass for a Pillow, 1906). Botchan, a comic novel based on his time in Matsuyama, became one of his most popular works. Kusamakura is a more experimental, lyrical novel about an artist seeking to transcend human emotion, a work Sōseki described as a "haikuesque novel" whose essence was beauty and which he hoped would offer readers solace from the pains of life.

=== Professional novelist for the Asahi Shimbun (1907–1916) ===
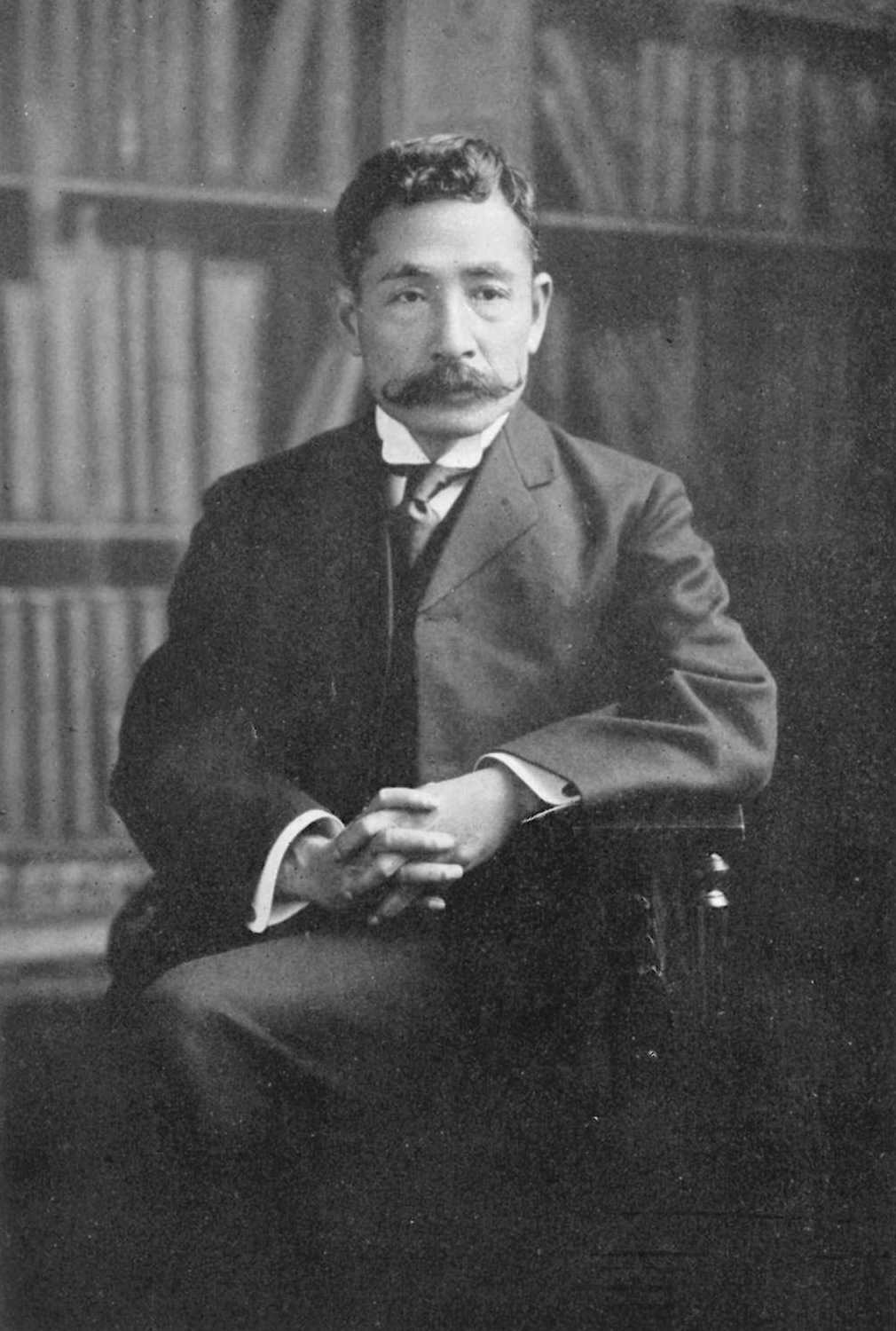
Sōseki in 1910

By 1907, Sōseki was a leading figure in the Japanese literary world. In an unprecedented move, the national newspaper Asahi Shimbun offered him an annual salary to write novels exclusively for serialization in its pages. Eager to escape the burdens of teaching and devote himself fully to writing, Sōseki accepted, resigning from his university posts. His decision was a landmark event, signaling the birth of both the Sōseki legend and the professional artist in modern Japan, a "non-aligned artist" shaping his own destiny outside the state bureaucracy.

At his home in Tokyo, Sōseki presided over a literary circle known as the Thursday Salon (Mokuyōkai), which met every week from 1906 until his death. The salon became an influential group of writers and scholars, including Suzuki Miekichi, Morita Sōhei, and Terada Torahiko, who became his disciples.

Sōseki's first novel for the Asahi, The Poppy (Gubijinsō, 1907), was a highly stylized melodrama that was immensely popular with readers but which Sōseki later dismissed as "badly made". He followed it with Sanshirō (1908), the first novel in a trilogy that explores themes of love, betrayal, and the assertion of the self. The subsequent novels in the trilogy are And Then (Sorekara, 1909) and The Gate (Mon, 1910). These works marked a turn toward deeper psychological exploration and a more somber tone.

In August 1910, while working on The Gate, Sōseki suffered a massive hemorrhage from his chronic stomach ulcers while on a trip to Shuzenji Hot Springs. In what became known as the "Shuzenji catastrophe", he vomited a basin full of blood and was unconscious for thirty minutes, hovering on the brink of death for several days. The event was national news, with the Asahi Shimbun providing daily updates on his condition. He survived, and later wrote that the experience gave him an "unconditional gratitude for life itself". However, his health remained fragile for the rest of his life. After his recovery, he wrote a memoir of the experience, "Recollecting and Other Matters" (1911).

Sōseki's later works grew increasingly dark, focusing on the themes of human egoism, loneliness, and the impossibility of true communication between individuals. In 1912, he wrote The Wayfarer (Kōjin), a portrait of a paranoid scholar descending into madness. This was followed in 1914 by Kokoro, his most famous novel in the West. It explores guilt, betrayal, and the spiritual loneliness of the modern era through the relationship between a young student and an older man he calls "Sensei". In 1915, he published his only overtly autobiographical work, Grass on the Wayside (Michikusa), which he distinguished from his other "autopsychological" novels. It revisited the painful early years of his marriage and the reappearance of his adoptive father.

== Personal life ==
Sōseki's personal life was marked by turmoil, stemming largely from his chronic physical and mental illnesses. From his early thirties, he suffered from severe stomach problems, which culminated in the near-fatal hemorrhage at Shuzenji in 1910 and continued to plague him until his death. He was also afflicted by a severe mental disorder, characterized by periods of intense depression and manic episodes involving paranoid delusions, irascibility, and sometimes violence. According to John Nathan, Sōseki may have had bipolar disorder. These episodes were particularly acute after his return from London and again from 1912 to 1914.

His relationship with his wife, Kyōko, was often fraught. While capable of gentleness when his health was stable, he was frequently a demanding, cold, and abusive husband, especially during his manic phases. The family, including their seven children (one of whom, Hinako, died in infancy in 1911), lived in a state of tension, "walking on eggshells" to avoid triggering his anger. His eldest daughter, Fude, later recalled him as a "difficult to approach and frightening" father with whom she felt little connection. Sōseki himself seemed aware of the distance, acknowledging that he "belonged to the world but not to... the family." His closest relationships were often with his male disciples in the Thursday Salon, to whom he acted as a mentor and father figure.

Despite his difficult personality, Sōseki could be charming and witty among friends. He had a deep appreciation for the traditional arts, practicing Noh chanting (utai), calligraphy, and sumi-e (ink wash painting). He was also an avid fan of rakugo, the traditional comic storytelling that influenced the humor and to a lesser extent the structure of I Am a Cat.

== Final year and death ==
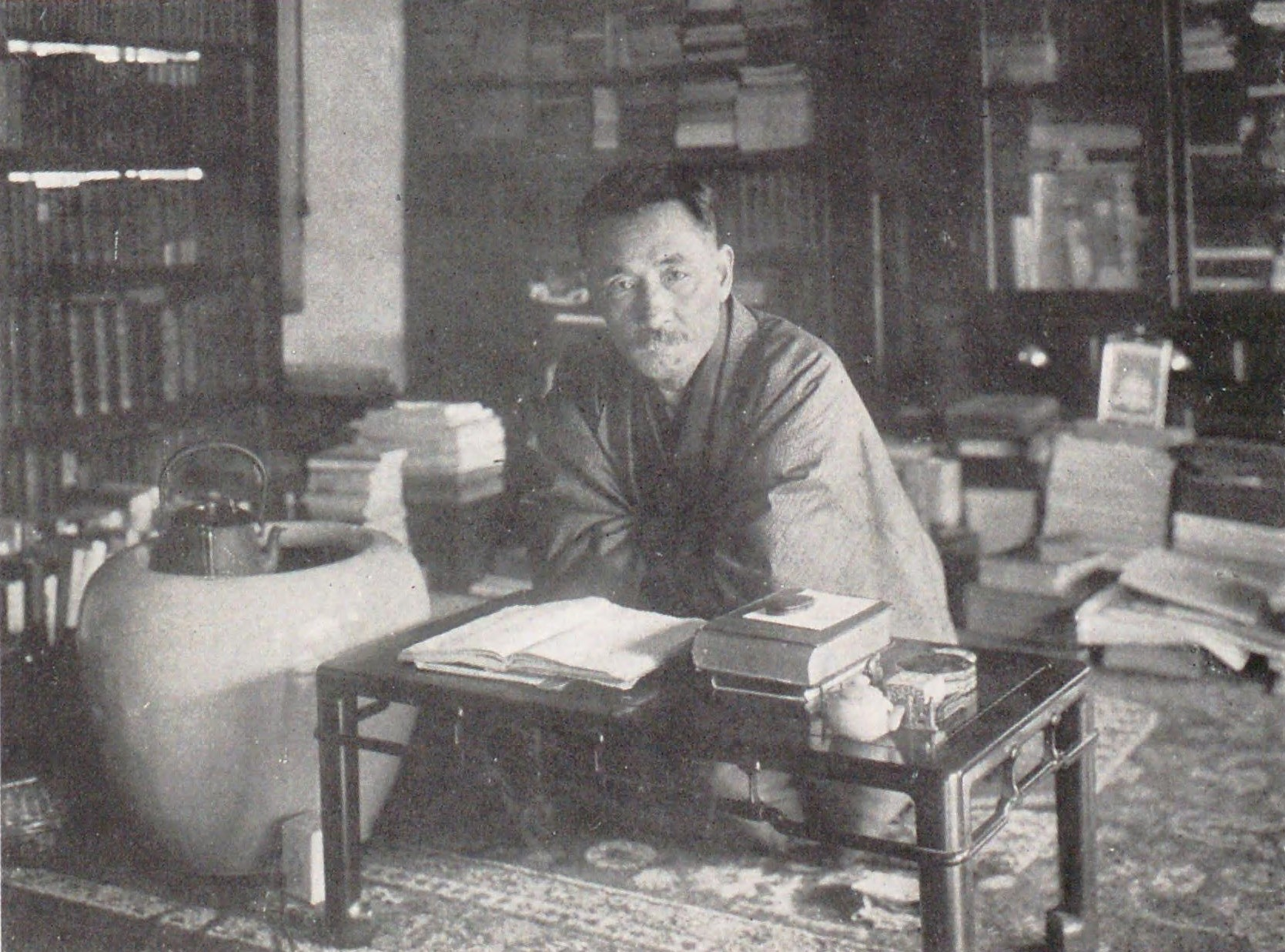
Sōseki in 1915

In early 1916, Sōseki was diagnosed with diabetes, adding to his burden of chronic illness. Despite his declining health, he began work on what would be his longest and final novel, Light and Dark (Meian), on 19 May. He resolved to keep writing as long as he could, declaring, "I am resolved to strive à la Chao Chou as long as my allotted time allows." He enjoyed a brief respite of good health and high spirits during the unusually cool summer, during which he wrote productively and corresponded warmly with his younger disciples, including a rising new talent, Ryūnosuke Akutagawa, whom he championed.

By late August, however, his health began to fail again. He worked on Light and Dark continuously, but the strain was evident in his deteriorating handwriting in the manuscript. On 22 November, after a dinner at a wedding banquet the previous night, his stomach condition worsened dramatically. He collapsed at his desk, having written only the installment number, "189," on a blank page.

Sōseki suffered another internal hemorrhage on 2 December and lost consciousness. Just before lapsing into a coma, he is said to have bared his chest, begged a nurse for water, and cried out, "Mustn't die." He lingered for another week, attended by his family, doctors, and disciples. He died on 9 December 1916, at the age of 49. His brain and stomach were donated to the Tokyo Imperial University's medical school for research. His final novel, Light and Dark, remained unfinished. He was buried in Zoshigaya Cemetery in Tokyo.

== Legacy ==
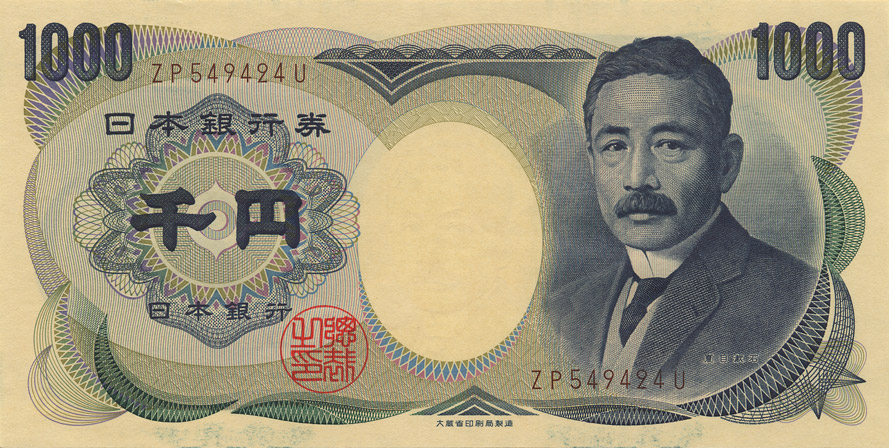
Sōseki on a 1984 series 1000 Japanese yen banknote

Sōseki is widely regarded as the most important novelist of Japan's modern era. His work marks a transition from the literature of the 19th century to a more modern, introspective style focused on the psychology of his characters. His novels grappled with the central concerns of his time: the tension between Westernization and Japanese tradition, the loneliness of the modern individual, the conflict between social obligation and personal freedom, and the inescapable nature of human egoism. His unique style, which evolved from the satirical patchwork of I Am a Cat to the dense psychological realism of Light and Dark, bent the Japanese language into a new instrument for exploring the inner lives of his characters with unprecedented precision. His personal motto was jiko-hon'i (自己本位), meaning "on my own terms," an individualism that prioritized personal integrity over external authority.

Sōseki's art was a response to a Japanese literary world he saw as a "wasteland," caught between a blind adherence to past traditions and a paralyzing imitation of the West. He characterized his own mind as "half-Western and half-Japanese," reflecting his position at the "midpoint of the dialectical balance between East and West." In this way, his personal struggle for identity mirrored Japan's national quest for a cultural identity in the modern world. By exploring this dilemma, Sōseki became not only a national writer but also a "universal artist" whose work speaks to modern readers everywhere.

His influence extends through the writers who gathered around him in the Thursday Salon, many of whom became major figures in their own right. His decision to self-publish Kokoro with the fledgling bookseller Iwanami Shigeo led to the creation of Iwanami Shoten, which became one of Japan's most distinguished publishing houses.

Sōseki's work has remained immensely popular in Japan. He is consistently voted "the most representative Japanese author" in national polls, ahead of authors like Murasaki Shikibu. His novels are standard reading in Japanese schools, and his portrait appeared on the 1,000-yen banknote from 1984 to 2004. In 2016, on the 100th anniversary of his death, an android modeled on him was unveiled to recite selections from his works.

Sōseki is featured as a character in Capcom's Ace Attorney video game installment The Great Ace Attorney Chronicles.

== Major works ==
List of major works of Natsume Sōseki
Year	Japanese title		English title	Notes
1905	吾輩は猫である	Wagahai wa Neko de aru	I Am a Cat	Novel
1905	倫敦塔	Rondon Tō	The Tower of London	Essay collection
1905	薤露行	Kairo-kō	Kairo-kō	Novel
1906	坊っちゃん	Botchan	Botchan	Novel
1906	草枕	Kusamakura	The Three-Cornered World	Novel; also known as The Grass Pillow and Kusamakura
1906	趣味の遺傳	Shumi no Iden	The Heredity of Taste	Novella
1906	二百十日	Nihyaku-tōka	The 210th Day	Novel
1907	野分	Nowaki	Nowaki	Novel
1907	虞美人草	Gubijinsō	The Poppy	Novel; also known as Field Poppy
1908	坑夫	Kōfu	The Miner	Novel
1908	夢十夜	Yume Jū-ya	Ten Nights of Dreams	Short story collection
1908	三四郎	Sanshirō	Sanshirō	Novel
1909	それから	Sorekara	And Then	Novel
1910	門	Mon	The Gate	Novel
1910	思い出す事など	Omoidasu Koto nado	Recollections	Memoir
1910	永日小品	Eijitsu shōhin	Spring Miscellany	Essay collection
1912	彼岸過迄	Higan Sugi Made	To the Spring Equinox and Beyond	Novel
1912	行人	Kōjin	The Wayfarer	Novel
1914	こころ	Kokoro	Kokoro	Novel
1914	私の個人主義	Watakushi no Kojin Shugi	My Individualism	Essay collection
1915	道草	Michikusa	Grass on the Wayside	Novel
1915	硝子戸の中	Garasu Do no Uchi	Inside My Glass Doors	Essay collection
1916	明暗	Meian	Light and Darkness	Unfinished novel; also known as Light and Dark

== See also ==
- Anglo-Japanese relations
- Fukuzawa Yukichi
- Japanese community of London
- Japanese literature
- List of Japanese authors
- Minae Mizumura – finished Natsume's last, unfinished novel, Light and Darkness
- Nakae Chōmin
- Susumu Nishibe
- Tsuneari Fukuda
- Yamamoto Tsunetomo
