= List of Japanese films of 1969 =

This is a list of films released in Japan in 1969. In 1969, there were 3602 movie theatres in Japan, with 2047 showing only domestic films and 845 showing both domestic and imported films. In total, there were 494 Japanese films released in 1969. In total, domestic films grossed 21,400 million yen in 1969. The highest grossing domestic film of 1969 was Samurai Banners.

== List of films ==
Japanese films released in 1969
Title	Japanese Title	Release date	Director	Cast	Genre	Notes
	処女ゲバゲバ	1969.__.__	Kōji Wakamatsu			
	恍惚の匂い	1969.__.__	Kaoru Umezawa			
	乳房で勝負	1969.__.__	Kōji Seki			
	無貞操少女	1969.__.__	北見一郎			
	密室	1969.__.__	Akitaka Kimata			
	現代 好色伝	1969.__.__	Kōji Wakamatsu			
	現代好色伝 テロルの季節	1969.__.__	Kōji Wakamatsu			
	生体密猟地帯 生体解剖	1969.__.__	Akitaka Kimata			
	痴漢の限界	1969.__.__	Shinya Yamamoto			
	悪徳中絶医	1969.__.__	Hajime Sasaki			
	甘すぎた情事	1969.__.__	Hajime Sasaki			
	ある処女の私生活	1969.__.__				
	色上手 人生四十八手	1969.__.__	野川宏			
	色ざんげ おいろけ祈祷師	1969.__.__	杜野煌			
	色の入口 愛欲絵巻	1969.__.__	水野冷			
	いろ+	1969.__.__	橘明			
	色乱舞	1969.__.__	橘明			
	犯された牝たち	1969.__.__	都築葉之助			
	男ごろし女ごろし 裸の銃弾	1969.__.__	Kōji Wakamatsu			
	男ごろし 極悪弁天	1969.__.__	Mamoru Watanabe			
	女極道狂い咲き	1969.__.__	Shōji Shinagawa			
	女と点と線	1969.__.__	Shinya Yamamoto			
	おんなの獄門	1969.__.__	Ryō Hagiwara			
	女の舌	1969.__.__	Masanao Sakao			
	女の取引	1969.__.__	Kan Kataoka			
	女の泣きどころ	1969.__.__	Shigeru Aoyama			
	女の(秘)地帯	1969.__.__	Shōji Shinagawa			
	奏でる名器	1969.__.__	Kensuke Sawa			
	狂い責め	1969.__.__	Shōji Shinagawa			
	契約妾 女子学生	1969.__.__	Masanao Sakao			
	現代性犯罪暗黒篇 ある通り魔の告白	1969.__.__	Kōji Wakamatsu			
	現代悪女伝	1969.__.__	Kiyoshi Komori			
	若妻 婚外行動	1969.__.__	Takeo Takagi			
	婚外情事	1969.__.__	大杉虎			
	色欲のおとし穴	1969.__.__	Kinya Ogawa			
	嫉妬	1969.__.__	Kan Mukai			
	しびれ泣き	1969.__.__	水野冷			
	十七歳の娼婦	1969.__.__	Takeo Takagi			
	情怨のおとし穴	1969.__.__	Ario Takeda			
	女王蜂乱行	1969.__.__	Kinya Ogawa			
	女高生のいたずら	1969.__.__	Ario Takeda			
	女子学生あんま	1969.__.__	伊世亜夫			
	女高生シリーズ 処女集団喪失	1969.__.__	Ario Takeda			
	処女性のめざめ	1969.__.__	Kinya Ogawa			
	処女悶絶	1969.__.__	伊世亜夫			
	女色痴態	1969.__.__	Shinya Yamamoto			
	女性自身	1969.__.__	Takashi Shiga			
	初夜権 昭和虐待史	1969.__.__	Kan Mukai			
	極道女子学生 処女無残	1969.__.__	淵野繁夫			
	生体解剖 女体密漁地帯	1969.__.__	Akitaka Kimata			
	性の配分	1969.__.__	Takeo Takagi			
	性の暴発	1969.__.__	橘明			
	性病(秘)特別白書	1969.__.__	Shinya Yamamoto			
	性（セックス）診断旅行	1969.__.__	Ario Takeda			
	性（セックス）ハンター 好色魔の記録	1969.__.__	Yasuhiko Saga			
	絶品の悪女	1969.__.__	Mamoru Watanabe			
	絶倫の報酬	1969.__.__	Kensuke Sawa			
	だまされた女狐	1969.__.__	Masanao Sakao			
	乳房のもだえ	1969.__.__	Kōe Shindō			
	毒ある経験	1969.__.__	Takashi Shiga			
	新妻のもだえ	1969.__.__	Mamoru Watanabe			
	肉ずき	1969.__.__	Seiichi Fukuda			
	ニュージャック&ベティ	1969.__.__	Isao Okijima			
	女犯刑罰史	1969.__.__	Ryō Hagiwara			
	濡れた尼僧	1969.__.__	Shōji Shinagawa			
	濡れた秘事 女高生体験記	1969.__.__	Ario Takeda			
	濡れる	1969.__.__	Masanao Sakao			
	濡れる女王蜂	1969.__.__	伊世亜夫			
	売春うら表	1969.__.__	Shinya Yamamoto			
	初めての陶酔	1969.__.__	Ario Takeda			
	恥ずかしい行為	1969.__.__	Masanao Sakao			
	肌くずれ	1969.__.__	高橋竜三			
	壺争い	1969.__.__	Mamoru Watanabe			
	人妻売春の罠	1969.__.__	Takeo Takagi			
	秘密ショー	1969.__.__	Yasuhiko Saga			
	深い欲情の谷間	1969.__.__	Kensuke Sawa			
	枕芸者	1969.__.__	Kan Mukai			
	十四十八手	1969.__.__	Kan Mukai			
	乱れたセーラー服	1969.__.__	Shinya Yamamoto			
	密室の裸女拷問	1969.__.__	Toshio Okuwaki			
	妾と妻	1969.__.__	Seiichi Fukuda			
	牝犬と狼	1969.__.__	Akitaka Kimata			
	モーレツかけもち女	1969.__.__	水野冷			
	夜になったら殺して	1969.__.__	Kei Miyaguchi			
	よろめきの秘体	1969.__.__	Ario Takeda			
Go, Go Second Time Virgin	ゆけゆけ二度目の処女	1969.__.__	Kōji Wakamatsu	Mimi Kozakura, Michio Akiyama	Avant-garde, drama	
	もだえる丘 秘密クラブ	1969.01.__	Kōe Shindō			
	火の女 昼も夜も	1969.01.__	Toshio Okuwaki			
Lewd Priest: Forty-Eight Positions Cutting	好色坊主四八十手斬り	1969.01.__	Kaoru Umezawa		Jidai-geki / Pink	
	三日三晩裏表	1969.01.__	Kaoru Umezawa			
	脱獄囚の記録より 失神	1969.01.__	Osamu Yamashita			
	女が満たされる時 魔性妻	1969.01.__	Hideki Miki			
	女王蜂乱交	1969.01.__	Kinya Ogawa			
	女体谷渡り	1969.01.__	橘明			
	疵もの女体	1969.01.__	Kan Kataoka			
	廓秘聞 情事のあとさき	1969.01.__	Kan Mukai			
	新・寝上手	1969.01.__	Shinya Yamamoto			
	人肉の市	1969.01.__	Akitaka Kimata			
	性の女獣	1969.01.__	Kinya Ogawa			
	肉体のよろこび	1969.01.__	Hideki Miki			
	日本三代好色伝	1969.01.__	Kōji Seki			
	日本裸絵巻	1969.01.__	Kiyoshi Komori			
	温泉芸者秘話 濡れまくら	1969.01.__	Kan Mukai			
	夜の技巧	1969.01.__	Hajime Sasaki			
	夜泣き肌	1969.01.__	橋本忠典			
	裸身の新妻	1969.01.__	Jirō Karasawa			
	知りすぎた女高生	1969.01.__	Kan Mukai, Hajime Sasaki			
	女子学生秘話 むしられた若草	1969.01.__	Shōji Shinagawa			
Blue Film Woman	ブルーフィルムの女	1969.01.__	Hiroshi Mukai	Mitsugu Fujii	Pink	
Computer Free-for-All	クレージーのぶちゃむくれ大発見	1969.01.01	Kengo Furusawa	The Crazy Cats		
Young Guy Graduates	フレッシュマン若大将	1969.01.01	Jun Fukuda	Yūzō Kayama, Wakako Sakai, Choko Iida		
Awaiting Gokudo	待っていた極道	1969.01.09	Kōsaku Yamashita		Yakuza	
Orgies of Edo	残酷異常虐待物語 元禄女系図	1969.01.09	Teruo Ishii	Toyozo Yamamoto, Mitusko Aoi, Akira Ishihama	Jidai-geki / Ero guro	
	ある女子高校医の記録 失神	1969.01.11	Tarō Yuge			
	花ひらく娘たち	1969.01.11	Buichi Saitō			
	青春の鐘	1969.01.11	Noboru Kaji			
Sleepy Eyes of Death: Castle Menagerie	眠狂四郎悪女狩り	1969.01.11	Kazuo Ikehiro		Jidai-geki	
	夕月	1969.01.11	Kōgi Tanaka			
	恋の乙女川	1969.01.11	Hirokazu Ichimura			
Dorifutaazu deso yo! Tokkun tokkun mata tokkun	ドリフターズですよ！ 特訓特訓また特訓	1969.01.15	Yusuke Watanabe	The Drifters		
5 Gents Fly to Kyushu	社長えんま帖	1969.01.15	Shue Matsubayashi	Hisaya Morishige, Asami Kuji, Keiju Kobayashi		
	にっぽん'69 セックス猟奇地帯	1969.01.18	Sadao Nakajima			
Delinquent Boss: Ocho the She-Wolf	不良番長 猪の鹿お蝶	1969.01.18	Yukio Noda		Yakuza	
Excommunication of the Damned	地獄の破門状	1969.01.22	Toshio Masuda			
	夜の牝 花と蝶	1969.01.22	Katsumi Nishikawa			
	日も月も	1969.01.25	Noboru Nakamura			
Secret's of a Women's Temple	秘録おんな寺	1969.01.25	Tokuzō Tanaka		Jidai-geki	
Blind Beast	盲獣	1969.01.25	Yasuzo Masumura	Eiji Funakoshi, Makao Midori, Noriku Sengoku		
Black Rose	黒薔薇の舘	1969.01.25	Kinji Fukasaku	Akihiko Maruyama, Eitaro Ozawa, Masakazu Tamura		
	0をつき上げろ	1969.02.__	Masanao Sakao			
	おいろけ天使	1969.02.__	Giichi Nishihara			
	モーレツ女とゼツリン男	1969.02.__	Kōji Seki			
	甘い行為	1969.02.__	Toshio Okuwaki			
	甘きつつ噛む	1969.02.__	Takeo Takagi			
	残酷肉体責め	1969.02.__	Ario Takeda			
	十代の乱交	1969.02.__	Leo Nishimura			
	処女よさらば	1969.02.__	橋本忠典			
	女色の悦楽	1969.02.__	Kinya Ogawa			
	寝強犯	1969.02.__	Kaoru Umezawa			
	素肌の密戟	1969.02.__	Ario Takeda			
	セックス・コレクター 腿切り魔	1969.02.__	Shinya Yamamoto			
	乳首	1969.02.__	Kei Miyaguchi			
	濡れた乳房	1969.02.__	Kinya Ogawa			
	悶え狂い	1969.02.__	Hajime Sasaki			
	嬲りもの 広域重要指定拳銃魔	1969.02.__	Akitaka Kimata			
	貞操帯	1969.02.__	Shinya Yamamoto			
	絶品の壺	1969.02.__	Mamoru Watanabe			
	野郎と情婦	1969.02.__	Hajime Sasaki			
	新日本暴行暗黒史 復讐鬼	1969.02.__	Kōji Wakamatsu			
	橋のない川	1969.02.01	Tadashi Imai			
Modern Yakuza: Law of the Shameless	現代やくざ 与太者の掟	1969.02.01	Yasuo Furuhata		Yakuza	
Red Peony Gambler: The Hanafuda Match	緋牡丹博徒 花札勝負	1969.02.01	Tai Katō		Yakuza	
Shutsugoku Shijuhachi Jikan	出獄四十八時間	1969.02.08	Kazuo Mori			
	女の警察	1969.02.08	Mio Ezaki			
Woman Gambler 12	女賭博師さいころ化粧	1969.02.08	Yoshio Inoue		Yakuza	
	夜の最前線 女狩り	1969.02.08	Motomu Ida			
	謝国権「愛」より (秘)性と生活	1969.02.11	Ryūichi Takamori			
	宵闇せまれば	1969.02.15	Akio Jissōji			
Kigeki Ekimae sanbashi	喜劇 駅前桟橋	1969.02.15	Toshio Sugie	Hisaya Morishige, Frankie Sakai, Eitaro Matsuyama		
Ai no kizuna	愛のきずな	1969.02.15	Takashi Tsuboshima	Mari Sono, Makoto Fujita, Makoto Sato		
Diary of a Shinjuku Thief	新宿泥棒日記	1969.02.15	Nagisa Oshima	Tadanori Yoko, Juro Kara, Rie Yokoyama		
	異常性愛記録 ハレンチ	1969.02.21	Teruo Ishii			
	永訣	1969.02.21	Hideo Ōba			
Past Offender	前科者 縄張荒し	1969.02.21	Shigehiro Ozawa			
	恋の季節	1969.02.21	Umetsugu Inoue			
Kanto Woman Scoundrel	関東おんな極道	1969.02.22	Kazuo Mori		Yakuza	
	女番長 仁義破り	1969.02.22	Mio Ezaki		Yakuza	
Gambler's Life: Unstoppable Bloodbath	博徒一代 血祭り不動	1969.02.22	Kimiyoshi Yasuda		Yakuza	
	野獣を消せ	1969.02.22	Yasuharu Hasebe			
	性遊戯	1969.02.24	Masao Adachi			
	炎の関係	1969.03.__	中川順夫			
	極道女高生	1969.03.__	中川亘			
	好色一代 無法松	1969.03.__	Ario Takeda			
	色道無宿	1969.03.__	Yasuo Yūki			
	新美人局 つつもたせ	1969.03.__	橘明			
	性鬼	1969.03.__	Kensuke Sawa			
	銭と肌 巷説三億円強奪事件	1969.03.__	Seiichi Fukuda			
	肉体の履歴書	1969.03.__	Kei Miyaguchi			
	軽犯罪法第一条二十三項 覗きの罪	1969.03.__	Toshio Okuwaki			
	欲情の季節	1969.03.__	Kan Mukai			
	暴露日記 情欲の季節	1969.03.__	Kan Mukai			
	キューバの恋人	1969.03.01	Kazuo Kuroki			
Kita Nihon o tobu	北日本を飛ぶ	1969.03.01	Chigusa Kobayashi		Documentary	
Samurai Banners	風林火山	1969.03.01	Hiroshi Inagaki	Toshiro Mifune, Kinnosuke Nakamura, Yoshiko Sakuma	Jidai-geki	
	妾二十一人 ど助平一代	1969.03.06	Masashige Narusawa			
Brutal Tales of Chivalry 5	昭和残侠伝 唐獅子仁義	1969.03.06	Masahiro Makino		Yakuza	
	性犯罪法入門	1969.03.08	Michihiko Obimori			
Showa Woman's Duty	昭和おんな仁義	1969.03.08	Tarō Yuge		Yakuza	
	涙の季節	1969.03.12	丹野雄二			
	恋のつむじ風	1969.03.12	Noboru Kaji			
Along with Ghosts	東海道お化け道中	1969.03.12	Kimiyoshi Yasuda	Kojira Hongo, Pepe Hozumi, Masami Rurukido	Jidai-geki	
Gamera vs. Guiron	ガメラ対大悪獣ギロン	1969.03.12	Noriaki Yuasa	Nobuhiro Kajima, Christopher Murphy, Miyuki Akiyama		
	少年とラクダ	1969.03.13	Osamu Takahashi			
	喜劇 一発大必勝	1969.03.15	Yōji Yamada			
Daimon: Otoko de shi nitai	代紋 男で死にたい	1969.03.15	Akinori Matsuo			
Villainy: Kill!	無頼 殺せ	1969.03.15	Keiichi Ozawa		Yakuza	
Crimson Bat: The Blind Swordsman	めくらのお市物語 真っ赤な流れ鳥	1969.03.15	Teiji Matsuda	Yoko Matsuyama, Isamu Nagato, Akitake Kono	Jidai-geki	
	ひとりぼっち	1969.03.18	Yoshio Takami			
	ひみつのアッコちゃん	1969.03.18	Yoshio Takami			
	怪物くん	1969.03.18	大隅正秋/秦泉寺博			
	チャコとケンちゃん	1969.03.18	Kenzō Kubokawa			
Puss 'n Boots	長靴をはいた猫	1969.03.18	Kimio Yabuki		Anime	
Ultraman, Ultraseven: Great Violent Monster Fight	ウルトラマン・ウルトラセブン モーレツ大怪獣戦	1969.03.21				
	皇太子ご一家の記録 おめでとう十年	1969.03.29	Tatsuji Yamagisa [Organization]			
Cherry Tree Loyalty Offering	さくら盃 義兄弟	1969.03.29	Nobuo Nakagawa		Yakuza	
	結婚します	1969.03.29	Noboru Nakamura			
Rising Dragon's Iron Flesh	昇り竜鉄火肌	1969.03.29	Teruo Ishii		Yakuza	
	落葉とくちづけ	1969.03.29	Kōichi Saitō			
Za • Tenputaazu–Namida no Ato ni Hohoemi o	ザ・テンプターズ 涙のあとに微笑みを	1969.03.29	Seiichiro Uchikawa	Kenichi Hagiwara, The Tempters, Masaaki Sakai	Melodrama	
Koi ni mezameru koro	恋にめざめる頃	1969.03.29	Masao Asano	Wakako Sakai, Keiji Higashiyama, Noriko Takahashi	Drama	
	(秘)女子大生 妊娠中絶	1969.03.30	Michio Konishi			
Gokudo Takes a Trip	旅に出た極道	1969.03.30	Junya Satō		Yakuza	
	色欲三重奏 だまされた女狐	1969.04.__	Mamoru Watanabe			
	ペテン師と極道女	1969.04.__	Kensuke Sawa			
	めす猫の性	1969.04.__	Kinya Ogawa			
	初布団	1969.04.__	Mamoru Watanabe			
	生の回転	1969.04.__	Kinya Ogawa			
	肉欲の争奪	1969.04.__	Kinya Ogawa			
	濡れた裸身	1969.04.__	Hajime Sasaki			
	燃えたい女	1969.04.__	Toshio Okuwaki			
	破れた肉体	1969.04.__	Yasuo Yūki			
	密通	1969.04.__	Akitaka Kimata			
	牝馬のいたずら	1969.04.__	Kōe Shindō			
	セックスの暴発	1969.04.__	橘明			
	異常の性 年上の女	1969.04.__	Ryō Hagiwara			
	情炎秘話 性の執念	1969.04.__	Kan Mukai			
	殺し屋をバラせ	1969.04.05	Kazuo Ikehiro			
Tejo Muyo	手錠無用	1969.04.05	Tokuzō Tanaka			
Red Peony Gambler: Second Generation Ceremony	緋牡丹博徒 二代目襲名	1969.04.10	Shigehiro Ozawa		Yakuza	
Legends of the Poisonous Seductress: Quick Draw Okatsu	妖艶毒婦伝 人斬りお勝	1969.04.10	Nobuo Nakagawa		Jidai-geki	
	沖縄列島	1969.04.11	Yōichi Higashi			
	殺すまで追え 新宿25時	1969.04.12	Kazuo Hase			
	霧のバラード	1969.04.12	Meijirō Umetsu			
Love Revisited	二人の恋人	1969.04.12	Shiro Moritani	Yūzō Kayama, Choei Takahashi, Wakako Sakai	Romance, melodrama	
Gone with Love, Come with Memory	津軽絶唱	1969.04.12	Yoshihiko Okamoto	Kinya Kitaoji, Yuriko Hoshi, Michiko Araki	Melodrama	
	やくざ渡り鳥 悪党稼業	1969.04.16	Mio Ezaki		Yakuza	
	夜の牝 年上の女	1969.04.16	Katsumi Nishikawa			
	世界のまち	1969.04.19	千石秀夫			
	ある見習看護婦の記録 赤い制服	1969.04.19	Reijirō Usuzaka			
	千羽鶴	1969.04.19	Yasuzō Masumura			
The Largest Gambling Den in the Postwar Period	戦後最大の賭場	1969.04.19	Kōsaku Yamashita		Yakuza	
	夜の歌謡シリーズ 長崎ブルース	1969.04.19	Ryūichi Takamori			
	無人列島	1969.04.25	Masaru Kanai			
	でっかいでっかい野郎	1969.04.26	Yoshitarō Nomura			
	喜劇 婚前旅行	1969.04.26	Masaharu Segawa			
Kureejii no dai bakuhatsu	クレージーの大爆発	1969.04.27	Kengo Furusawa	The Crazy Cats		
Let's Go "Drifters"	ドリフターズですよ！ 全員突撃	1969.04.27	Yoshinori Wada	The Drifters		
	お産と避妊	1969.05.__	Kinya Ogawa			
	愛欲の痴図 鎌倉情死考	1969.05.__	Akitaka Kimata			
	回転ベッド？	1969.05.__	Kan Mukai			
	黒いセックス	1969.05.__	小野末津雄			
	黒毛の沼	1969.05.__	Kaoru Umezawa			
	処女の肌	1969.05.__	Toshio Okuwaki			
	女極道色欲一代	1969.05.__	伊世亜夫			
	焼えたい女	1969.05.__	Toshio Okuwaki			
	情事の後始末	1969.05.__	Masanao Sakao			
	情事のデザイン	1969.05.__	Shinichirō Hayashi			
	続・青い暴行	1969.05.__	Kōe Shindō			
	乳房開眼	1969.05.__	Seiichi Fukuda			
	情事の窓より 秘密ショウ	1969.05.__	Yasuhiko Saga			
	魔性の夜	1969.05.__	Masanao Sakao			
	裸体の街	1969.05.__	Akitaka Kimata			
	いろ卍	1969.05.__	橘明			
	愛するあした	1969.05.01	Kōichi Saitō			
Kanto Woman's Bad Reputation	関東おんな悪名	1969.05.01	Kazuo Mori		Yakuza	
Woman Gambler 13	女賭博師十番勝負	1969.05.01	Shigeo Tanaka		Yakuza	
	野蛮人のネクタイ	1969.05.01	Noboru Kaji			
Goyokin	御用金	1969.05.01	Hideo Gosha	Tatsuya Nakadai, Tetsuro Tamba, Kinnosuke Nakamura	Jidai-geki	
Inferno of Torture	徳川いれずみ師 責め地獄	1969.05.02	Teruo Ishii		Jidai-geki	
Brothers Serving Time	懲役三兄弟	1969.05.03	Kiyoshi Saeki			
	臍閣下	1969.05.05	西江孝之			
	若者は行く－続若者たち－	1969.05.10	Tokihisa Morikawa			
	釣金亀 The Millionaire Chase	1969.05.12	Umetsugu Inoue			
	ニホンザル －その群れと生活－	1969.05.14	Osamu Sakai			
	前科 仮釈放	1969.05.14	Keiichi Ozawa			
	超高層のあけぼの	1969.05.14	Hideo Sekikawa			
100 Gamblers	博徒百人	1969.05.14	Takashi Nomura		Yakuza	
Danpu Hippu Banpu Kurebare Yaro Domo	ダンプ・ヒップ・バンプ くればれ野郎ども	1969.05.17	Michihiko Obimori			
The Bodyguards' Revenge	用心棒兇状旅	1969.05.17	Akira Inoue		Jidai-geki	
	猛烈社員 スリゴマ忍法	1969.05.17	Hirokazu Ichimura			
BGS of Ginza	夜の熱帯魚	1969.05.17	Umeji Inoue Yoshiko Kayama, Yumiko Nogawa, Kikko Matsuoka			
5 Gents Fly to Kyushu, Part II	続社長えんま帖	1969.05.17	Shue Matsubayashi	Hisaya Morishige, Keiju Kobayashi, Yoko Tsukasa		
AIDO - Slave of Love	愛奴	1969.05.22	Susumu Hani	Yuri Suemasa, Kenzo Kawarazaki, Kimiko Nukamura		
Fylfot Woman Assassin	おんな侠客卍	1969.05.24	Kōsaku Yamashita		Jidai-geki	
Double Suicide	心中天網島	1969.05.24	Masahiro Shinoda	Kichiemon Nakamura, Shima Iwashita, Hosei Komatsu	Jidai-geki	
	ひとりっ子	1969.05.25	Miyoji Ieki			
	女学生ゲリラ	1969.05.26	Masao Adachi			
	続女の警察	1969.05.28	Mio Ezaki			
	夜の最前線 東京女地図	1969.05.28	Motomu Ida			
Modern Yakuza: Shameless Obligation	現代やくざ 与太者仁義	1969.05.31	Yasuo Furuhata		Yakuza	
Chilvarous Story of Japan: Flower and Dragon	日本侠客伝 花と龍	1969.05.31	Masahiro Makino		Yakuza	
Broken Swords	秘剣破り	1969.05.31	Kazuo Ikehiro		Jidai-geki	
Devil's Temple	鬼の棲む館	1969.05.31	Kenji Misumi	Shintaro Katsu, Hideko Takamine, Michiyo Aratama	Jidai-geki	
	(秘)妾	1969.06.__	北見一郎			
	昭和元禄 おいろけ女忠臣蔵	1969.06.__	Kōe Shindō			
	ためいき	1969.06.__	Shinichirō Hayashi			
	ピカピカハレンチ	1969.06.__	Kōji Seki			
	一夫多妻	1969.06.__	Kensuke Sawa			
	女体情話	1969.06.__	Seiichi Fukuda			
	女湯物語	1969.06.__	Shinya Yamamoto			
	競艶おんな極道 色道二十八人衆	1969.06.__	Ario Takeda			
	寝とられた女	1969.06.__	Yasuo Yūki			
	狙われた濡れ肌	1969.06.__	Kinya Ogawa			
	男を喰う乳房	1969.06.__	Yasuhiko Saga			
	痴漢魔	1969.06.__	Toshio Okuwaki			
	情痴逆さ吊り	1969.06.__	Ryō Hagiwara			
	秘伝 腹芸十八番	1969.06.__	Kan Mukai			
	未亡人下宿	1969.06.__	Shinya Yamamoto			
	ねじ式映画 私は女優	1969.06.02	Hisaya Iwasa			
	とめてくれるなおっ母さん	1969.06.07	田向正健			
	千夜一夜物語	1969.06.14	Eiichi Yamamoto			
	あらくれ	1969.06.14	Yasuharu Hasebe			
Wicked Priest: A Killer's Pilgrimage	極悪坊主 念仏人斬り旅	1969.06.14	Takashi Harada		Yakuza	
Lady Sazen and the Drenched Shallow Sword	女左膳 濡れ燕片手斬り	1969.06.14	Kimiyoshi Yasuda		Jidai-geki	
	女殺し屋 牝犬	1969.06.14	Yoshio Inoue			
Daimon: Jigoku no Sakazuki	代紋 地獄の盃	1969.06.14	Akinori Matsuo			
Delinquent Boss: Detention Blues	不良番長 練鑑ブルース	1969.06.14	Yukio Noda		Yakuza	
Burakku • komedii–Aa! Baka	ブラック・コメディ ああ！馬鹿	1969.06.14	Eizo Sugawa	Shoichi Ozawa, Noriko Takahashi, Keiju Kobayashi	Black comedy	
Shinuniwa mada hayai	死ぬにはまだ早い	1969.06.14	Kiyoshi Nishimura	Toshio Kurosawa, Mako Midori, Kōji Takahashi	Thriller	
	七つの顔の女	1969.06.21	Yōichi Maeda			
Trapped, the Crimson Bat	めくらのお市 地獄肌	1969.06.21	Teiji Matsuda	Yoko Matsuyama, Yasunori Irikawa, Kikko Matsuoka	Jidai-geki	
Yakuza Punishment: Lynch Law	やくざ刑罰史 私刑	1969.06.27	Teruo Ishii		Yakuza	
	温泉ポン引女中	1969.06.27	Misao Arai			
	俺たちの荒野	1969.06.28	Masanobu Deme			
	残酷おんな私刑	1969.06.28	丹野雄二			
Ghost Story of Yotsuya: Curse of Oiwa	四谷怪談 お岩の亡霊	1969.06.28	Kazuo Mori		Jidai-geki	
	博徒無情	1969.06.28	Buichi Saitō			
Boruneo taisho–Sekido ni Kakeru	ボルネオ大将 赤道に賭ける	1969.06.28	Tadashi Sawashima	Kinya Kitaoji, Komaki Kurihara, Shiro Otsuji	Drama	
	好色 きんちゃく切りの女	1969.07.__	Toshio Okuwaki			
	しびれる狂宴	1969.07.__	Toshio Okuwaki			
	フーテン処女	1969.07.__	Masanao Sakao			
	性科相談 完全なる避妊	1969.07.__	Shinya Yamamoto			
	禁じられた濡れごと師	1969.07.__	葉山隣			
	通り魔の告白 現代性犯罪暗黒篇	1969.07.__	Kōji Wakamatsu			
	私は犯されました 偽人の証言	1969.07.__	Kaoru Umezawa			
	処女暴露	1969.07.__	Kinya Ogawa			
	初もの喰い	1969.07.__	Mamoru Watanabe			
	女犯系図	1969.07.__	Kan Mukai			
	据え膳夜話	1969.07.__	橘明			
	草むらの情痴	1969.07.__	Kinya Ogawa			
	恥かしめ	1969.07.__	Ryō Hagiwara			
	濡れた悪女	1969.07.__	Kei Miyaguchi			
	初夜の条件	1969.07.__	大杉虎			
	女子学生の記録 気絶	1969.07.__	Shin Murakami			
	断絶の世界	1969.07.01	Akira Ide			
	ひばり・橋の花と喧嘩	1969.07.05	Yoshitarō Nomura			
	夕陽の恋人	1969.07.05	Umetsugu Inoue		Drama	
Japan's Violent Gang: Boss	日本暴力団 組長	1969.07.08	Kinji Fukasaku		Yakuza	
	夜の歌謡シリーズ 港町ブルース	1969.07.08	Ryūichi Takamori			
	あゝ海軍	1969.07.12	Mitsuo Murayama		Jidai-geki	
	ハーイ！ロンドン	1969.07.12	Katsuki Iwauchi			
Rising Dragon's Soft Flesh Exposed	昇り竜やわ肌開張	1969.07.12	Masami Kuzū		Yakuza	
	前科 ドス嵐	1969.07.12	Keiichi Ozawa			
	与太郎戦記	1969.07.12	Tarō Yuge			
Swinging London	ザ・タイガース ハーイ!ロンドン	1969.07.12	Katsumi Iwauchi	The Tigers	Comedy	
Young Guy on Mt. Cook	ニュージーランドの若大将	1969.07.12	Jun Fukuda	Yūzō Kayama, Wakako Sakai, Choko Iida	Musical romance	
	栄光への5000キロ	1969.07.15	Koreyoshi Kurahara			
	ひみつのアッコちゃん	1969.07.20	Hiroshi Ikeda			
	もーれつア太郎	1969.07.20	Nobutaka Nishizawa , 永樹凡人			
Ninja Scope	飛び出す冒険映画 赤影	1969.07.20	Junji Kurata		Jidai-geki / Tokusatsu / Ninja	
Flying Phantom Ship	空飛ぶゆうれい船	1969.07.20	Hiroshi Ikeda		Anime	Animated film
	いい湯だな 全員集合！！	1969.07.23	Yūsuke Watanabe			
	喜劇 大激突	1969.07.23	Kōgi Tanaka			
	ある女子高校医の記録 続・妊娠	1969.07.26	Michihiko Obimori			
	やくざ非情史 刑務所兄弟	1969.07.26	Akinori Matsuo		Yakuza	
Bloody-Violent Turf	広域暴力団 流血の縄張	1969.07.26	Yasuharu Hasebe		Yakuza	
Bamboo Leaf Omon	笹笛お紋	1969.07.26	Tokuzō Tanaka		Jidai-geki	
Boy	少年	1969.07.26	Nagisa Oshima	Akiko Koyama, Fumio Watanabe	Drama	
Kyojin no hoshi	巨人の星	1969.07.26	Tadao Nagahama			Animated feature
Latitude Zero	緯度0大作戦	1969.07.26	Ishirō Honda	Joseph Cotten, Cesar Romero, Akira Takarada	Science fiction	Japanese-American co-production
Chivalrous Geisha	日本女侠伝 侠客芸者	1969.07.31	Kōsaku Yamashita		Yakuza	
Delinquent Boss: Escort Wolf	不良番長 送り狼	1969.07.31	Makoto Naitō		Yakuza	
	引裂かれた女高生	1969.08.__	鹿島洋			
	家出娘	1969.08.__	橘明			
	女の恥部RAA物語 華麗なる本能	1969.08.__	Kan Mukai			
	穴に賭ける	1969.08.__	Shōji Shinagawa			
	血まみれの犯行	1969.08.__	Akitaka Kimata			
	後家部落	1969.08.__	Shinya Yamamoto			
	女のしずく	1969.08.__	Kōe Shindō			
	女肉 狂い責め	1969.08.__	Ario Takeda			
	尻軽娘	1969.08.__	原良輔			
	新妻交換	1969.08.__	Shinya Yamamoto			
	中絶手術	1969.08.__	Kōe Shindō			
	独身処理	1969.08.__	橘明			
	引き裂かれたブルーフィルム	1969.08.__	Kaoru Umezawa			
	痴女の戯れ	1969.08.__	Toshio Okuwaki			
	肌のもつれ	1969.08.__	Hajime Sasaki			
Battle of the Japan Sea	日本海大海戦	1969.08.01	Seiji Maruyama	Toshiro Mifune, Tatsuya Nakadai, Yūzō Kayama	War	
	喜劇 逆転旅行	1969.08.09	Masaharu Segawa			
Woman Gambler 14	女賭博師丁半旅	1969.08.09	Yoshio Inoue		Yakuza	
	コント55号と水前寺清子のワン・ツウー・パンチ 三百六十五歩のマーチ	1969.08.09	Yoshitarō Nomura			
The Woman Gambler	藤田五郎の姐御	1969.08.09	Buichi Saitō		Jidai-geki	
Nihon Zankyo-Den	日本残侠伝	1969.08.09	Masahiro Makino		Yakuza	
Hitokiri	人斬り	1969.08.09	Hideo Gosha	Shintaro Katsu, Tatsuya Nakadai, Yukio Mishima	Jidai-geki	
Bounty Hunter 1: The Killer's Mission	賞金稼ぎ	1969.08.13	Shigehiro Ozawa		Jidai-geki / Ninja	
New Abashiri Prison: Duel at Ryujin Key	新網走番外地 流人岬の血斗	1969.08.13	Yasuo Furuhata		Yakuza	
Konto55go–Jinrui no Daijakuten	コント55号 人類の大弱点	1969.08.13	Jun Fukuda	Konto55	Comedy	
Cherry Tree Loyalty Offering: Gambling Code	さくら盃 仁義	1969.08.23	Seiichirō Uchikawa		Yakuza	
Big Gang Members: Attack!	大幹部 殴り込み	1969.08.23	Toshio Masuda		Yakuza	
	喜劇 深夜族	1969.08.27	Yūsuke Watanabe			
	夜の歌謡シリーズ 悪党ブルース	1969.08.27	Ryūichi Takamori			
	青春萬歳 The Singing Escort	1969.08.27	Umetsugu Inoue			
Love and Crime	明治大正昭和 猟奇女犯罪史	1969.08.27	Teruo Ishii	Teruo Yoshida, Sada Abe, Yukie Kagawa	Drama	
It's Tough Being a Man	男はつらいよ	1969.08.27	Yoji Yamada	Kiyoshi Atsumi, Chieko Baisho, Sachiko Mitsumoto		
	いそぎんちゃく	1969.08.30	Tarō Yuge			
Prison Break	刑務所破り	1969.08.30	Kazuo Ikehiro		Yakuza	
	まくらの悪戯	1969.09.__	Masanao Sakao			
	姦婦の部屋	1969.09.__	Akitaka Kimata			
	狂走情死考	1969.09.__	Kōji Wakamatsu			
	処女スターに二人の夫あり	1969.09.__	Kinya Ogawa			
	人妻千一夜	1969.09.__	Kensuke Sawa			
	生娘悶絶	1969.09.__	Kinya Ogawa			
	肉体の罠	1969.09.__	Kinya Ogawa			
	日本処女暗黒史	1969.09.__	Kan Mukai			
	おんな情欲絵巻 必殺女斬り	1969.09.__	Seiichi Fukuda			
	裸身盗人	1969.09.__	Seiichi Fukuda			
	セックスの群がり	1969.09.__	Kinya Ogawa			
	壺さがし	1969.09.__	Mamoru Watanabe			
	私が棄てた女	1969.09.03	Kirio Urayama			
	夜をひらく (女)の市場	1969.09.03	Mio Ezaki			
Organized Violence: Sibling Sake Goblet	組織暴力 兄弟盃	1969.09.06	Junya Satō		Yakuza	
Certain Kill Gambling Den	必殺博奕打ち	1969.09.06	Kiyoshi Saeki		Yakuza	
Bullet Wound	弾痕	1969.09.10	Shiro Moritani	Yūzō Kayama, Kiwako Taichi, Kei Satō	Thriller	
L'Essayage	華麗なる闘い	1969.09.10	Masao Asano	Keiko Kishi, Yoko Naito, Shigeru Kamiyama	Drama	
Yakuza Home Turf	やくざ番外地	1969.09.13	Shōgorō Nishimura		Yakuza	
The Magoichi Saga	尻啖え孫市	1969.09.13	Kenji Misumi		Jidai-geki	
	続・与太郎戦記	1969.09.13	Reijirō Usuzaka			
100 Gamblers: Chivalrous Path	博徒百人 仁侠道	1969.09.13	Takashi Nomura		Yakuza	
Funeral Parade of Roses	薔薇の葬列	1969.09.13	Toshio Matsumoto			
	海はふりむかない	1969.09.17	Kōichi Saitō			
	ごろつき部隊	1969.09.19	Shigehiro Ozawa		Yakuza	
Onna Oyabun Kenka Tosei	女親分 喧嘩渡世	1969.09.19	Takashi Harada		Yakuza	
Portrait of Hell	地獄変	1969.09.20	Shiro Toyoda	Kinnosuke Nakamura, Tatsuya Nakadai, Yoko Naito	Jidai-geki	
Flower of Chivalry Torn Asunder: Gambling Heir	侠花列伝 襲名賭博	1969.09.27	Keiichi Ozawa			
	女の手配師 池袋の夜	1969.09.27	Kazunari Takeda			
Kikikaikai Ore wa Dareda?!	奇々怪々俺は誰だ？！	1969.09.27	Takashi Tsuboshima	Kei Tani, Hajime Hana, Hideko Yoshida	Comedy	
	OH・モーレツ ハレンチレポート	1969.10.__	杜野煌			
	異常集団	1969.10.__	Takashi Shiga			
	泣き寝入り	1969.10.__	早坂絋			
	禁じられた失神	1969.10.__	Kensuke Sawa			
	処女買います	1969.10.__	北見一郎			
	やわ肌無宿 男殺し女殺し	1969.10.__	Kōji Wakamatsu			
	桃色秘密ルート	1969.10.__	橘明			
	濡れ肌仁義	1969.10.__	橘明			
	覗かれた密室	1969.10.__	Kōe Shindō			
	情欲の鞭	1969.10.__	Ario Takeda			
	喜劇 女は度胸	1969.10.01	Azuma Morisaki			
Red Peony Gambler: Notorious Gambler	緋牡丹博徒 鉄火場列伝	1969.10.01	Kōsaku Yamashita		Yakuza	
Legends of the Poisonous Seductress: Okatsu the Fugitive	妖艶毒婦伝 お勝兇状旅	1969.10.01	Nobuo Nakagawa		Jidai-geki	
Watch Out, Crimson Bat!	めくらのお市 みだれ笠	1969.10.01	Hirokazu Ichimura	Yoko Matsuyama, Goro Ibuki, Asahi Kurizuka	Jidai-geki	
	ベトナム	1969.10.02	Satsuo Yamamoto			
Kanto Woman's Bad Temper	関東おんなド根性	1969.10.04	Akira Inoue		Yakuza	
Kyoshiro Nemuri: Full Circle Killing Method	眠狂四郎円月殺法	1969.10.04	Kazuo Mori		Jidai-geki	
	やくざ非情史 血の盃	1969.10.08	中川順夫		Yakuza	
	傷害恐喝 前科十三犯	1969.10.08	Akinori Matsuo			
Konto55go–Ore wa ninja no mago no mago	コント55号 俺は忍者の孫の孫	1969.10.10	Jun Fukuda	Konto55	Comedy	
Red Lion	赤毛	1969.10.10	Kihachi Okamoto	Toshiro Mifune, Etsushi Takahashi, Shigero Koyama	Jidai-geki	
	荒い海	1969.10.15	Tokujirō Yamazaki			
	太陽の野郎ども	1969.10.15	Umetsugu Inoue			
Memoir of Japanese Assassins	日本暗殺秘録	1969.10.15	Sadao Nakajima			
Delinquent Boss: Sewer Rat Plan	不良番長 どぶ鼠作戦	1969.10.15	Yukio Noda		Yakuza	
	夕陽に向かう	1969.10.15	Kōgi Tanaka			
Eros Plus Massacre	エロス+虐殺	1969.10.15 [France]	Yoshishige Yoshida	Mariko Okada, Toshiyuki Hosokawa, Yūko Kusunoki	Avant-garde, drama	
	ヤングパワー・シリーズ 新宿番外地	1969.10.18	Michihiko Obimori			
	女体	1969.10.18	Yasuzō Masumura			
	夜の牝 花のいのち	1969.10.18	Kenjirō Morinaga			
	昭和やくざ系図 長崎の顔	1969.10.18	Takashi Nomura		Yakuza	
	太陽のオリンピア MEXICO 1968 Olympiada en Mexico	1969.10.25	Alberto Isaac			
	(秘)劇画 浮世絵千一夜	1969.10.29	Leo Nishimura			
	かげろう	1969.10.29	Kaneto Shindō			
	わが恋わが歌	1969.10.29	Noboru Nakamura			
	パルチザン前史	1969.10.30	土本典昭			
Horrors of Malformed Men	江戸川乱歩全集 恐怖奇形人間	1969.10.31	Teruo Ishii	Teruo Yoshida, Minoru Oki, Asao Koike	Horror	
	みだら舞	1969.11.__	Kan Mukai			
	女が鞭で嬲る時	1969.11.__	Ario Takeda			
	女の七つ道具	1969.11.__	Shōji Shinagawa			
	情欲の虜	1969.11.__	Kinya Ogawa			
	肉の標的 逃亡	1969.11.__	大杉虎			
	乳房狂乱	1969.11.__	Jirō Ninomiya			
	盛り妻	1969.11.__	Toshio Okuwaki			
	処女誘惑魔	1969.11.__	Kei Miyaguchi			
	あゝ陸軍隼戦闘隊	1969.11.01	Mitsuo Murayama		WWII	
Second Generation Young Yakuza Boss	二代目若親分	1969.11.01	Kimiyoshi Yasuda		Yakuza	
	涙でいいの	1969.11.01	丹野雄二			
Nippon ichi no danzetsu otoko	日本一の断絶男	1969.11.01	Eizo Sugawa	Hitoshi Ueki, Mako Midori, Osami Nabe	Comedy	
A Lord Incognito	水戸黄門漫遊記	1969.11.01	Yasuki Chiba	Hisaya Morishige, Akira Takarada, Tadao Takashima	Jidai-geki	
House of Racketeers	関東テキヤ一家	1969.11.08	Noribumi Suzuki		Yakuza	
	"人妻より"夜の掟	1969.11.15	Michiyoshi Doi			
	喜劇 よさこい旅行	1969.11.15	Masaharu Segawa			
	極道ペテン師	1969.11.15	Kōji Chino			
Woman Gambler 15	女賭博師花の切り札	1969.11.15	Yoshio Inoue		Yakuza	
Blood End	天狗党	1969.11.15	Satsuo Yamamoto		Jidai-geki	
Tora-San's Cherished Mother	続・男はつらいよ	1969.11.15	Yoji Yamada	Kiyoshi Atsumi, Chieko Baisho, Shin Morikawa		
Japan's Violent Gang: Boss and Assassin	日本暴力団 組長と刺客	1969.11.20	Junya Satō		Yakuza	
	夜の歌謡シリーズ おんな	1969.11.20	Ryūichi Takamori			
Yakuza Home Turf 2	やくざ番外地 抹殺	1969.11.22	Nozomu Yanase		Yakuza	
Storm of Violence	朱鞘仁義 鉄火みだれ桜	1969.11.22	Buichi Saitō		Jidai-geki	
Kigeki Shinjuku hiroba	喜劇 新宿広場	1969.11.22	Kunihiko Yamamoto	Keiju Kobayshi, Norihei Miki, Atsuko Takahashi		
Dai Nippon suri dan	大日本スリ集団	1969.11.22	Jun Fukuda	Keiju Kobayashi, Norihei Miki, Atsuko Takahashi	Comedy drama	
Brutal Tales of Chivalry 6	昭和残侠伝 人斬り唐獅子	1969.11.28	Kōsaku Yamashita		Yakuza	
	あなたの好み	1969.11.29	Noriaki Yuasa			
	ヤングパワー・シリーズ 大学番外地	1969.11.29	Michihiko Obimori			
	ざこ寝	1969.12.__	Kōe Shindō			
	セックス旅行	1969.12.__	Kinya Ogawa			
	みんなが見ている前で	1969.12.__	Akitaka Kimata			
	狂った情痴	1969.12.__	Haruo Matsubara			
	激しく抱いて	1969.12.__	野川宏			
	好きもの夫婦	1969.12.__	Kōe Shindō			
	初夜風俗史	1969.12.__	Kan Mukai			
	女犯	1969.12.__	Toshio Okuwaki			
	肉欲の抜穴	1969.12.__	鹿島洋			
	猫なめずり	1969.12.__	Hajime Sasaki			
	秘密クラブの女	1969.12.__	Kōji Seki			
Band of Assassins	新撰組	1969.12.05	Tadashi Sawashima	Toshiro Mifune, Keiju Kobayashi, Kinya Kitaoji	Jidai-geki	
Shikaku Retsuden	刺客列伝	1969.12.06	Shōgorō Nishimura			
Musume zakari	娘ざかり	1969.12.06	Takeshi Matsumori	Yoko Naito, Takashi Higashiyama, Megumi Matsumoto		
Resurrection of the Beast	野獣の復活	1969.12.06	Michio Yamamoto	Tatsuya Mihashi, Toshio Kurosawa, Yoshiko Mita	Action	
Bounty Hunter 2: The Fort of Death	五人の賞金稼ぎ	1969.12.13	Eiichi Kudō		Jidai-geki / Ninja	
	いつか来るさよなら	1969.12.17	Yoshirō Kawazu			
	栄光の黒豹	1969.12.17	Hirokazu Ichimura			
Kenka Bakuto: Jigoku no Hanamichi	喧嘩博徒 地獄の花道	1969.12.17	Akinori Matsuo			
Go To Hell!	朱鞘仁義 お命頂戴	1969.12.17	Buichi Saitō		Jidai-geki	
The Haunted Castle	秘録怪猫伝	1969.12.20	Tokuzō Tanaka		Jidai-geki	
Kyoshiro Nemuri: Spinning Wheel Killing	眠狂四郎卍斬り	1969.12.20	Kazuo Ikehiro		Jidai-geki	
Konto55go–Uchu daiboken	コント55号 宇宙大冒険	1969.12.20	Jun Fukuda	Konto55	Science fantasy comedy	
Kyojin no hoshi–Ike Ike hyuma	巨人の星 行け行け飛馬	1969.12.20	Tadao Nagahama			Animated feature
All Monsters Attack	ゴジラ・ミニラ・ガバラ オール怪獣大進撃	1969.12.20	Ishirō Honda	Tomonori Yazaki, Kenji Sahara, Sachio Sakai		
Bad Reputation: One Chance	悪名一番勝負	1969.12.27	Masahiro Makino		Yakuza	
	新・与太郎戦記	1969.12.27	Shigeo Tanaka			
New Abashiri Prison: Drifter at Edge of World	新網走番外地 さいはての流れ者	1969.12.27	Kiyoshi Saeki		Yakuza	
Yakuza's Tale	渡世人列伝	1969.12.27	Shigehiro Ozawa		Yakuza	
	チンチン55号ぶっ飛ばせ！出発進行	1969.12.31	Yoshitarō Nomura			
	ミヨちゃんのためなら 全員集合！！	1969.12.31	Yūsuke Watanabe			
	華やかな女豹	1969.12.31	Mio Ezaki			
	嵐の勇者たち	1969.12.31	Toshio Masuda			

== See also ==
- 1969 in Japan
- 1969 in Japanese television
