= 1969 in Japan =

- Decades: 1940s; 1950s; 1960s; 1970s; 1980s
- See also: Other events of 1969; History of Japan; Timeline; Years

Events in the year 1969 in Japan.

== Incumbents ==
- Emperor: Hirohito
- Prime Minister: Eisaku Satō (Liberal Democratic)
- Chief Cabinet Secretary: Shigeru Hori
- Chief Justice of the Supreme Court: Masatoshi Yokota until January 10, Kazuto Ishida from January 11
- President of the House of Representatives: Mitsujirō Ishii until July 16, Takechiyo Matsuda from December 3 to December 27
- President of the House of Councillors: Yūzō Shigemune

=== Governors ===
- Aichi Prefecture: Mikine Kuwahara
- Akita Prefecture: Yūjirō Obata
- Aomori Prefecture: Shunkichi Takeuchi
- Chiba Prefecture: Taketo Tomonō
- Ehime Prefecture: Sadatake Hisamatsu
- Fukui Prefecture: Heidayū Nakagawa
- Fukuoka Prefecture: Hikaru Kamei
- Fukushima Prefecture: Morie Kimura
- Gifu Prefecture: Saburō Hirano
- Gunma Prefecture: Konroku Kanda
- Hiroshima Prefecture: Iduo Nagano
- Hokkaido: Kingo Machimura
- Hyogo Prefecture: Motohiko Kanai
- Ibaraki Prefecture: Nirō Iwakami
- Ishikawa Prefecture: Yōichi Nakanishi
- Iwate Prefecture: Tadashi Chida
- Kagawa Prefecture: Masanori Kaneko
- Kagoshima Prefecture: Saburō Kanemaru
- Kanagawa Prefecture: Bunwa Tsuda
- Kochi Prefecture: Masumi Mizobuchi
- Kumamoto Prefecture: Kōsaku Teramoto
- Kyoto Prefecture: Torazō Ninagawa
- Mie Prefecture: Satoru Tanaka
- Miyagi Prefecture: Shintaro Takahashi (until 27 March); Sōichirō Yamamoto (starting 28 March)
- Miyazaki Prefecture: Hiroshi Kuroki
- Nagano Prefecture: Gon'ichirō Nishizawa
- Nagasaki Prefecture: Katsuya Sato
- Nara Prefecture: Ryozo Okuda
- Niigata Prefecture: Shiro Watari
- Oita Prefecture: Kaoru Kinoshita
- Okayama Prefecture: Takenori Kato
- Osaka Prefecture: Gisen Satō
- Saga Prefecture: Sunao Ikeda
- Saitama Prefecture: Hiroshi Kurihara
- Shiga Prefecture: Kinichiro Nozaki
- Shiname Prefecture: Choemon Tanabe
- Shizuoka Prefecture: Yūtarō Takeyama
- Tochigi Prefecture: Nobuo Yokokawa
- Tokushima Prefecture: Yasunobu Takeichi
- Tokyo: Ryōkichi Minobe
- Tottori Prefecture: Jirō Ishiba
- Toyama Prefecture: Minoru Yoshida (until 1 December); Kokichi Nakada (starting 30 December)
- Wakayama Prefecture: Masao Ohashi
- Yamagata Prefecture: Tōkichi Abiko
- Yamaguchi Prefecture: Masayuki Hashimoto
- Yamanashi Prefecture: Kunio Tanabe

== Events ==
- January 5 - According to Japan Coast Guard official confirmed report, a bulk carrier Boriba Maru capsized off Nojimazaki Lighthouse, Chiba Prefecture, 31 crew were fatalities.
- January 18 to 19 - According to Japan National Police Agency official confirmed report, a fierce battle between riot police unit and extreme and core university students in Yasuda Auditorium, Tokyo University, during the 1968–69 Japanese university protests. A total of 457 students were arrested and 757 injured.
- February 5 - A resort hotel fire in Bandai-Atami Spa, Koriyama, Fukushima Prefecture, according to Fire and Disaster Management Agency, official confirmed report, 30 persons lost their lives, with 35 persons injured.
- April 3- According to JFDMA official confirmed report, a gas explosion hit Moshiri coal mine in Akabira, Hokkaido, official resulting death toll is 19 persons, with 24 persons hurt. This mine officially shut down on April 30.
- May 16 – Senon Security Service was founded, as predecessor name of FarEastern Security Service.
- June 24 to July 11 - According to Japan Fire and Disaster Management Agency official confirmed report, a torrential rain, following landslide hit in Kagoshima Prefecture and Miyazaki Prefecture, this natural disaster total death number of 89 person.
- October 1 - The National Space Development Agency of Japan is established.
- December 1 - Sumitomo Bank introduces Japan's first ATM.
- December 27 - 1969 Japanese general election - Liberal Democratic Party win 47.6% of popular vote, Yoshirō Mori, Tsutomu Hata and Ichirō Ozawa all elected for first time

== Births ==
- January 27 - Cornelius, rock musician, singer and producer (Flipper's Guitar)
- January 29 - Hyde, rock musician, singer and guitarist
- February 6 – Masaharu Fukuyama, singer-songwriter and actor
- February 11 – Takeshi Obata, manga artist
- February 20 - Keiji Takayama, professional wrestler
- March 12 - Akemi Okamura, voice actress
- March 15 - Yutaka Take, jockey
- March 27 - Satoshi Nakajima, former professional baseball player and current coach
- March 29 - Chiaki Ishikawa, singer See-Saw
- April 11 - Chisato Moritaka, singer
- April 18 - Sayako Kuroda, formerly Sayako, Princess Nori, daughter of Emperor Akihito
- May 15 - Hideki Irabu, baseball player
- May 18 – Noriyuki Makihara, singer-songwriter
- June 4 - Takako Minekawa, musician, composer and writer
- June 29 - Tōru Hashimoto, politician, lawyer, mayor of Osaka city and former leader of the Japan Innovation Party
- July 8 - Sugizo, guitarist and singer
- July 18 - Masanori Murakawa, professional wrestler
- August 8 - Dick Togo, professional wrestler
- August 13 - Midori Ito, figure skater
- September 12 - Shigeki Maruyama, golfer
- October 2 - Jun Akiyama, professional wrestler
- October 3
  - Yuriko Ishida, actress and essayist
  - Tetsuya, musician
- October 14 - Kōsuke Okano, voice actor
- November 17 - Ryōtarō Okiayu, voice actor
- November 20 - Sakura, musician
- December 13 - Hideo Ishikawa, voice actor
- December 20
  - Chisa Yokoyama, voice actress
  - Kenji Ogiwara, former Nordic combined skier
  - Tsugiharu Ogiwara, former Nordic combined skier
- December 24
  - Taro Goto, footballer
  - Ryuji Kato, footballer
  - Miyuki Matsushita, voice actress
  - Mariko Shiga, voice actress (d. 1989)

== Deaths ==
- February 1 – Prince Morihiro Higashikuni, husband of Princess Teru (b. 1917)
- February 11 – Kosaburo Eto, JGSDF official (suicide) (b. 1946)
- April 26 - Morihei Ueshiba, martial artist and founder of Aikido (b. 1883)
- June 1 - Michiyo Tsujimura, agricultural scientist (b. 1888)
- July 9 - Raizō Tanaka, admiral (b. 1892)
- July 17 - Ichikawa Raizō VIII, actor (b. 1931)

== See also ==
- 1969 in Japanese television
- List of Japanese films of 1969
- 1969 in Japanese music
