= Takahama =

Takahama can refer to:

== Places ==
- Takahama, Aichi, a city in Aichi Prefecture, Japan
- Takahama, Fukui, a town in Fukui Prefecture, Japan

== People ==
- Aiko Takahama, women's professional shogi player
- Kyoshi Takahama (1874 – 1959), a Japanese writer
- Takahama Tatsurō (b. 1976), former fighting name Japanese sumo wrestler now known as Hamanishiki Tatsurō
