= Blind Beast vs. Dwarf =

2001 film by Teruo Ishii

Blind Beast vs. Dwarf 盲獣vs一寸法師
- Directed by: Teruo Ishii
- Written by: Teruo Ishii; Edogawa Rampo (original story by novels)
- Produced by: Teruo Ishii
- Starring: Lily Franky; Shinya Tsukamoto; Tetsurō Tamba
- Cinematography: Teruo Ishii
- Edited by: Masaki Yaguchi; Akiko Yamashita
- Music by: Chika Fujino; Haru Oooka
- Production company: Teruo Ishii Production
- Distributed by: Teruo Ishii Production / Slow Learner
- Release date: 24 June 2001
- Running time: 95 minutes
- Country: Japan
- Language: Japanese

Blind Beast vs. Dwarf (盲獣vs一寸法師, Mōjū tai Issunbōshi) a.k.a. Blind Beast vs. Killer Dwarf is a 2001 Japanese horror film directed by Teruo Ishii in his final effort before his death in 2005.

Mieko Tanaka, elected to the Diet in the 2009 Japanese general election, appears in a role that includes a nude scene. This precipitated a surge in its sales that year.

== Plot ==
While returning home after viewing an all-girls opera, dime-novel writer Monzo Kobayashi encounters a strange deformed dwarf dressed in samurai garb carrying a woman's severed arm. Unnerved yet fascinated by the encounter, Monzō begins his own research into dwarfs including the mysterious samurai-clad man. Introduced to investigator Kogoro Akechi by an old friend, Monzō learns about a string of grisly murders involving the same man whom Monzō had encountered. As time wears on, Monzō's fascination soon becomes an obsession as he desperately tries to find the secret behind the murders and the strange man.

== Cast ==
- Lily Franky as Monzō Kobayashi
- Shin'ya Tsukamoto as Kogorō Akechi
- Hisayoshi Hirayama as Mōjuu / Blind Beast
- Little Frankie as Issunbōshi / Dwarf
- Mutsumi Fujita as Ranko Mizuki
- Reika Hashimoto as Yurie Yamano
- Tetsurō Tanba as Dr. Tange
- Kenpachirō Satsuma as Yasukawa, the doll-maker

== Release ==
=== Home media ===
The film was released on DVD by Panik House Entertainment on August 22, 2006. It was later released by Synapse Films on September 29, 2009.

== See also ==
- Horrors of Malformed Men
