= Fujibayashi =

Fujibayashi (藤林) is a Japanese surname.

== Surname ==
- Chiko Fujibayashi (藤林 千子, born 1996), Japanese field hockey player
- Ekizo Fujibayashi (藤林 益三, 1907–2007), Japanese chief justice
- Hidemaro Fujibayashi (藤林 秀麿, born 1972), Japanese game designer
- Shoko Fujibayashi (藤林 聖子, born 1972), Japanese lyricist

== Fictional characters ==
- Sheena Fujibayashi (藤林 しいな) from Tales of Symphonia
- Suzu Fujibayashi (藤林 すず) from Tales of Phantasia
- Kyou Fujibayashi (藤林 杏) and Ryou Fujibayashi (藤林 椋) from Clannad.
- Kyouko Fujibayashi (藤林 響子) from The Irregular at Magic High School
