= Tomokazu Murakami =

Chief Justice of Japan

Tomokazu Murakami (Japanese: 村上朝一; May 25, 1906 – February 13, 1987) was the 6th Chief Justice of Japan (1973–1976). He was a graduate of the University of Tokyo. He was a recipient of the Order of the Rising Sun. He was born in Fukuoka Prefecture.

| Preceded by Kazuto Ishida | Chief Justice of Japan; 1973–1976 | Succeeded by Ekizo Fujibayashi |

== Bibliography ==
- 山本祐司『最高裁物語（上・下）』（日本評論社、1994年）（講談社+α文庫、1997年）
