= Masao Okahara =

8th Chief Justice of Japan

Masao Okahara (Japanese: 岡原昌男; April 1, 1909 – July 14, 1994) was the 8th Chief Justice of Japan (1977–1979). He was graduate of the University of Tokyo. He was a recipient of the Order of the Rising Sun.

| Preceded by Ekizo Fujibayashi | Chief Justice of Japan; 1977–1979 | Succeeded by Takaaki Hattori |

== Bibliography ==
- 山本祐司『最高裁物語（上）』（日本評論社、1994年）（講談社+α文庫、1997年）ISBN 4-06-256192-1
- 山本祐司『最高裁物語（下）』（日本評論社、1994年）（講談社+α文庫、1997年）ISBN 4-06-256193-X
