= Sekai (magazine) =

Japanese political magazine

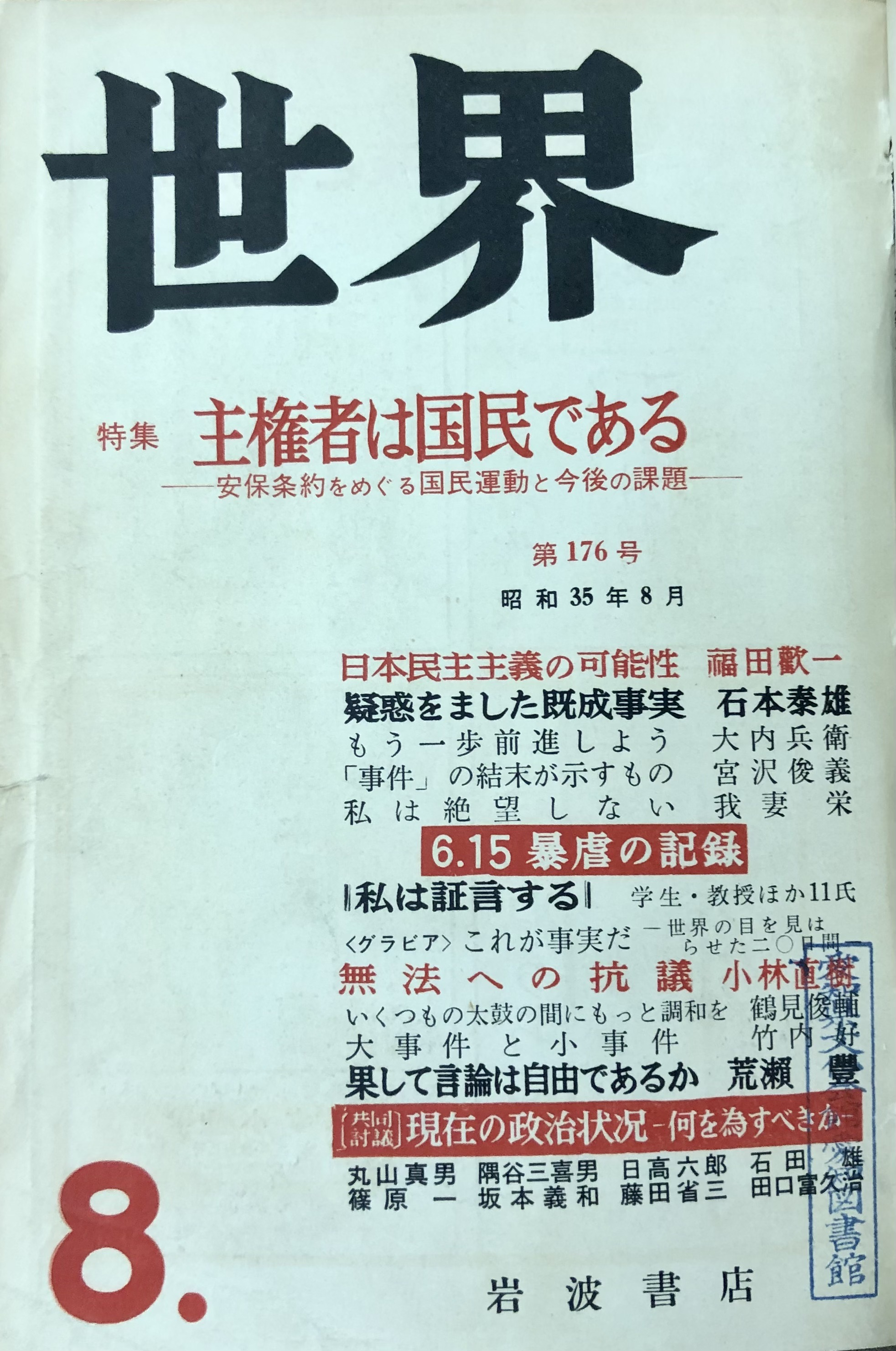
An August 1960 copy of Sekai

Sekai (Japanese: 世界 "World") is a Japanese monthly political magazine published by Iwanami Shoten, which was founded in December 1945. The first issue was published in 1946. The magazine is published monthly. It has a left-wing or progressive political stance. The magazine's founding principles were "peace and social justice, freedom and equality, and harmony and solidarity with the peoples of East Asia." The headquarters is in Tokyo. Yamaguchi Akio served as an editor of the magazine for a long period.
