= Yoshishige Abe =

Japanese politician (1883–1966)

- 安倍 能成
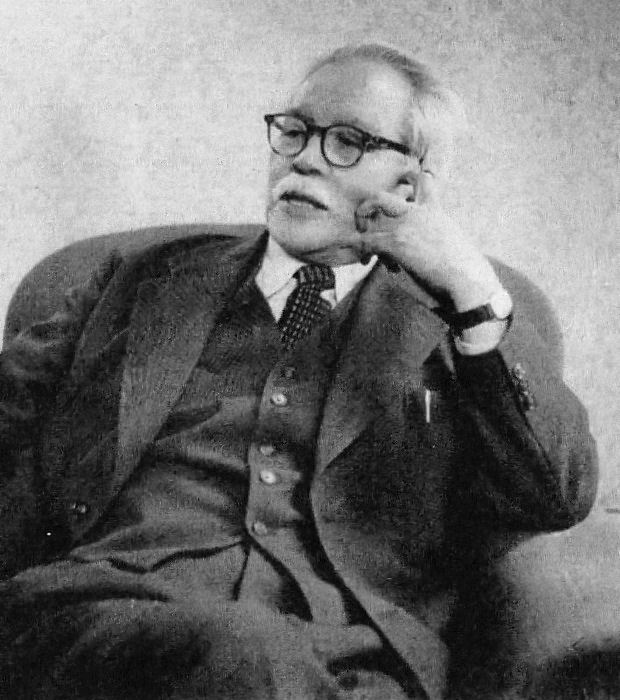
- Abe in 1956

Minister of Education
- In office 13 January 1946 – 22 May 1946
- Prime Minister: Kijūrō Shidehara
- Preceded by: Maeda Tamon
- Succeeded by: Kōtarō Tanaka

Member of the House of Peers
- In office 19 December 1945 – 2 May 1947 Nominated by the Emperor

Personal details
- Born: 23 December 1883 Matsuyama, Ehime, Japan
- Died: 7 June 1966 (aged 82) Hongō, Tokyo, Japan
- Resting place: Tokei-ji
- Education: Tokyo Imperial University
- Occupation: Educator, politician, cabinet minister
- Awards: Yomiuri Prize (1958)

Yoshishige Abe (安倍 能成, Abe Yoshishige; 23 December 1883 – 7 June 1966) was a philosopher, educator, and statesman in Shōwa period Japan. As Minister of Education in the immediate post-war era, he oversaw major reforms to the Japanese educational system.

== Early life and education ==
Abe was born in Matsuyama, Ehime Prefecture as the son of a doctor of Chinese medicine. He graduated from Tokyo Imperial University, and was a close associate of Natsume Sōseki, Seiichi Hatano, Kyoshi Takahama and Shigeo Iwanami, although he was forced to return home to teach English in Matsuyama due to reduced family circumstances. He later married the sister of Misao Fujimura. While still a student, he began writing literary criticism and was interested in the development of naturalism.

== Academic career ==
From 1920, Abe worked as a professor at Hosei University; however, he toured Europe extensively and spent some time at Heidelberg University in 1924 where he studied Kantian philosophy. In 1926 he accepted a position at Keijō Imperial University in Keijō (Seoul), in colonial Korea, where he became interested in Korean culture and Korean literature. He travelled to China in 1929, visiting Jinan, Qufu and climbed Mount Tai, and noted the strong Japanese commercial presence throughout Shandong Province. He also visited Manchuria and noted the increasing Chinese presence in Harbin

Abe returned to mainland Japan in 1940, returning to his alma mater, the Daiichi High School in Tokyo. However, Abe soon ran afoul of the military authorities with his outspoken criticism of the military’s plans to cut short school curriculums to increase the numbers of conscripts, and of Prime Minister Fumimaro Konoe’s efforts to create a single-party state. Although occasionally harassed by the Kempeitai, he was not arrested.

== Political career ==
After the end of World War II, Abe was appointed to a seat in the Upper House of the Diet of Japan in December 1945, and from January through May 1946 served as Minister of Education in the cabinet of Prime Minister Kijūrō Shidehara, where he oversaw the post-war reform of the Japanese educational system. He helped draft the Fundamental Law of Education, and the current Tōyō kanji and Modern kana usage guidelines. As Education Minister, he also stated that he felt it was fortunate that Japan had been occupied by America instead of the Soviet Union. From October 1946, he was principal of the Gakushuin Peers’ School – a post he held until his death in 1966.

== Later life ==
Abe was a strong supporter of the anti-war movement in the late 1950s and early 1960s, but maintained a critical stance against post-war socialism, which he viewed as dangerous as pre-war militarism.

Abe was awarded the Yomiuri Literary Prize in 1958 for his biography of Shigeo Iwanami. In 1964, he was awarded the Grand Cordon of the Order of the Sacred Treasure.

Abe died in Tokyo in 1966, but his grave is at the temple of Tōkei-ji in Kamakura.

== Notes ==
Political offices
Preceded by Tamon Maeda	Minister of Education; 13 Jan 1946 – 22 May 1946	Succeeded by Kōtarō Tanaka
