= Orgies of Edo =

1969 film directed by Teruo Ishii

- Poster
- Directed by: Teruo Ishii
- Starring: Teruo Yoshida
- Release date: 1969

Orgies of Edo (Japanese title: 残酷異常虐待物語 元禄女系図 (Zankoku Ijo Gyakutai Monogatari Genroku Jokeizu) lit. Brutality, Abnormality and Abuse: A Genealogy of Genroku Women) is a 1969 Japanese grotesque erotica film directed by Teruo Ishii. The film comprises three episodes all set in the Genroku era.

== Cast ==
=== 1st segment ===
- Teruo Yoshida: Gentatsu
- Toyozô Yamamoto: Hanji
- Masumi Tachibana: Oito

=== 2nd segment ===
- Mitsuko Aoi: Ochise
- Akira Ishihama: Chokichi, Ochise's servant

=== 3d segment ===
- Asao Koike: Lord Ng
- Yujie Kagawa: Okon, Lord Ng's concubine
- Miki Obana: Mitsu, a servant

== Production ==
The film is Ishii's second ero guro production, after Shogun’s Joy of Torture (1968). Orgies of Edo is also considered to be the fourth entry in Toei's 'abnormal love' film series.

== Release ==
The film was theatrically released in Japan on January 9, 1969.

== Reception ==
A retrospective review at Asian Movie Pulse stated: "Orgies of Edo is a definite cult film, and evidently, a difficult one to watch. At the same time, though, it features an artistry rarely appearing in the category, which will definitely reward anyone who is willing to see beyond the extremity of the three stories." In another retrospective review, Classic Horror wrote, "the disturbing images in Orgies of Edo come from the violent side, not the erotic side". Another commentator wrote, "Many viewers can probably resist Ishii’s deviant blend of kinbaku, paraphilia, monstrosity and surrealism – but those who cannot are in for a heady treat that casts them too (...) as falling somewhere between human and beast."
