= Shigeo Iwanami =

Japanese politician

- 岩波 茂雄
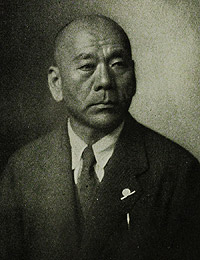

Member of the House of Peers
- In office 4 April 1945 – 25 April 1946 Nominated by the Emperor

Personal details
- Born: 27 August 1881 Suwa, Nagano, Japan
- Died: 25 April 1946 (aged 64) Atami, Shizuoka, Japan
- Resting place: Tōkei-ji
- Education: First Higher School; Tokyo Imperial University
- Occupation: Publisher
- Awards: Order of Culture

Shigeo Iwanami (岩波茂雄, Iwanami Shigeo; 27 August 1881 – 25 April 1946) was a publisher in the early Shōwa period Japan, and founder of Iwanami Shoten.

== Biography ==
Iwanami was born in what is now part of Suwa, Nagano, into a farming family. His father was a village headman, but he died when Iwanami was age 15, and Iwanami was raised by his mother. With the assistance of Shigetake Sugiura, he completed high school in Tokyo. A friend of Misao Fujimura, he was so overcome by the latter’s suicide that he withdrew to a mountain hut at Lake Nojiri for 49 days, contemplating suicide himself, until his mother came to get him.

Iwanami entered Tokyo Imperial University in 1905, where he became interested in the teachings of Uchimura Kanzō, although he never converted to Christianity. He married in 1906, and graduated from the Department of Philosophy in 1908. After graduation, Iwanami worked as an instructor at the Kanda Upper Women’s School, and at the Tokyo Women's School of Gymnastics and Music. Inspired by Leo Tolstoy, Iwanami was convinced that women need to receive an education equal to that of men. Also, during this period, he established a literary circle with his close friend, Yoshishige Abe and held weekly meetings in his home with leading authors to discuss intellectual matters. In 1913, Iwanami opened a used book store and publishing house, Iwanami Shoten, in Jinbōchō, Tokyo, with the idea that he could use this as a start to begin publishing and disseminating works which he felt to be of intellectual value, and quit his teaching job to devote his full energy into the venture. The following year, he assisted Natsume Sōseki in publishing Kokoro, launching both Natsume’s career as a novelist and his own career as a publisher. Even after Natsume Sōseki died in 1916, ongoing revenues from the publication of his works provided Iwanami with the funding necessary to proceed with numerous projects. This included the translation into Japanese and publication of the works of most European philosophers of the 19th and early 20th centuries, including Immanuel Kant, Hegel and Karl Marx.

In the 1920s and 1930s, Iwanami concentrated on publishing both scientific works and works of philosophy, as well as attempting to popularize the Japanese classics and new authors, calling his selection the “Iwanami Culture”. He also published a paperback series in order to make his prices affordable to students. From late 1927 to early 1928, he toured Manchuria and north China as a guest of the South Manchurian Railway, together with Kiyoshi Miki. During the interwar period, Iwanami developed such close ties with academics in Kyoto and Tokyo that his company enjoyed an almost complete monopoly on academic publishing in Japan. However, he drew the wrath of Japanese militarists by publicly denouncing the Second Sino-Japanese War as “a war Japan should not be involved in,” and in 1940 he drew unfavorable attention again by publishing works by Tsuda Sōkichi that questioned the veracity of Japan’s historical antecedents as described in the Kojiki and Nihon Shoki. Iwanami was arrested in 1942, but acquitted in 1944.

Iwanami was appointed to a seat in the House of Peers in the Diet of Japan in 1945, as one of the highest taxpayers in Japan. He was awarded the Order of Culture by the Japanese government in 1946. He died of an intracranial hemorrhage in April that year. His grave is at the temple of Tokei-ji in Kamakura.
