= Kisaburo Yokota =

Japanese judge and jurist-consultant (1896–1993)

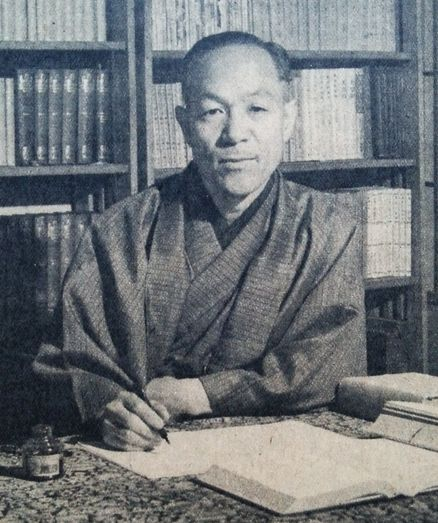
Kisaburo Yokota

Kisaburo Yokota (横田 喜三郎, Yokota Kisaburō, August 6, 1896 – February 17, 1993) was a Japanese international legal scholar. He served as the 3rd Chief Justice of Japan from 1960 to 1966. He graduated from the Tokyo Imperial University and later served on its faculty. He received the Degree of Doctor of Law (Tokyo Imperial University). He was a recipient of the Order of Culture and the Order of the Rising Sun. His grave is in Gokoku-ji Temple Cemetery, Bunkyō-ku, Tokyo.

Preceded by Kōtarō Tanaka	Chief Justice of Japan; 1960–1966	Succeeded by Masatoshi Yokota
