= Crimson Bat =

- Film poster for Crimson Bat, the Blind Swordswoman (1969)
- Directed by: Teiji Matsuda; Hirokazu Ichimura
- Starring: Yoko Matsuyama
- Production company: Shochiku
- Country: Japan
- Language: Japanese

Crimson Bat is the international title for the series of four jidaigeki films (three from 1969 and one from 1970) based on the character Blind Oichi (めくらのお市, Mekura no Oichi).

== Character ==
The character of Blind Oichi is a blind swordswoman created by Teruo Tanashita in a manga published by Shukan Manga Times, in what is believed to be a response to the hugely successful Zatoichi series. The main difference, apart from being a female, was that her weakness is a stereotyped female tendency to be emotional. The character was played by Yōko Matsuyama, future wife of the original manga author Teruo Tanashita, who had starred as swordswomen in a number of popular TV series including Kotohime Shichi Henge (The Seven Faces of Princess Koto) from 1960 to 1962, Tsukihime Toge (Princess Tsuki Pass) in 1963, and Tabigarasu Kurenai Osen (Crimson Osen The Wanderer) from 1968 to 1969. The origin of the international English title "Crimson Bat" is unclear. Some have suggested that it was due to her wearing a crimson red kimono and being "blind as a bat", as the saying goes. Others have claimed the title came from a much earlier non-related film entitled Crimson Bat (紅蝙蝠, Kurenai Kawahori) (1958) which featured Yōko Matsuyama in a supporting role. Another (perhaps more likely) reason was that Matsuyama had just finished playing a sword-wielding character named "Crimson Osen" in the aforementioned 52 episode TV series Tabigarasu Kurenai Osen. The character appeared in 4 films released by Shochiku studios, before moving on to television just as the Zatoichi series did. An official Zatoichi-based film about a blind swordswoman was released decades later entitled Ichi, which featured the title character searching for her mentor Zatoichi (seen in flashbacks).

== List of films ==
1. Crimson Bat: The Blind Swordswoman (めくらのお市物語 真っ赤な流れ鳥, Mekura no Oichi Monogatari: Makkana Nagaredori) (1969) (IMDB link)
2. Trapped, the Crimson Bat/The Blind Swordswoman: Hellish Skin (めくらのお市 地獄肌, Mekura no Oichi: Jigokuhada) (1969) (IMDB link)
3. Watch Out, Crimson Bat! (めくらのお市 みだれ笠, Mekura no Oichi: Midaregasa) (1969) (IMDB link)
4. Crimson Bat - Oichi: Wanted, Dead or Alive (めくらのお市 命貰います, Mekura no Oichi: Inochi Moraimasu) (1970) (IMDB link)

In 1971 Nippon TV ran a Crimson Bat (めくらのお市, Mekura no Oichi) TV series also starring Yoko Matsuyama with Hiroshi Fujioka. This series was produced by Union Motion Picture Co, Ltd. (ユニオン映画) and ran for 25 episodes from April 12, 1971, to September 27, 1971. Cult director Teruo Ishii directed episodes 1, 2, 12, 13, 14, 15, 24, and 25 (the series finale).
