= Shogun's Sadism =

1976 Japanese splatter film

- Directed by: Yūji Makiguchi
- Written by: Seikō Shimura; Ichirō Ōtsu
- Produced by: Tatsuo Honda
- Cinematography: Katsuo Katsuki
- Edited by: Eifu Tamaki
- Music by: Takeo Watanabe
- Production company: Toei Company
- Distributed by: Toei Company
- Release date: September 4, 1976
- Running time: 80 minutes
- Country: Japan
- Language: Japanese

Shogun's Sadism (徳川女刑罰絵巻 牛裂きの刑, Tokugawa onna keibatsu-emaki: Ushi-zaki no kei transl. The Joy of Torture 2: Oxen Split Torturing) is a 1976 Japanese splatter film. It tells two stories set in Edo period Japan: one involving a Christian girl who is taken as a slave and tortured, the other about a brothel master who tries to escape with a girl he fell in love with. It is a follow-up to the 1968 film Shogun's Joy of Torture.
