= Iwanami Shoten =

Japanese publishing company

- Founded: 1913; 113 years ago
- Founder: Shigeo Iwanami
- Country of origin: Japan
- Headquarters location: Tokyo
- Key people: Masanori Sakamoto (President and CEO)
- Publication types: Books
- Official website: www.iwanami.co.jp

Iwanami Shoten, Publishers (株式会社岩波書店, Kabushiki Gaisha Iwanami Shoten) is a Japanese publishing company based in Tokyo.

Iwanami Shoten was founded in 1913 by Iwanami Shigeo. Its first major publication was Natsume Sōseki's novel Kokoro, which appeared as a book in 1914 after being serialized in the Asahi Shimbun. Iwanami has since become known for scholarly publications, editions of classical Japanese literature, dictionaries, and high-quality paperbacks. Since 1955, it has published the Kōjien, a single-volume dictionary of Japanese that is widely considered to be authoritative.

Iwanami's head office is at Hitotsubashi 2–5–5, Chiyoda, Tokyo.

== History ==
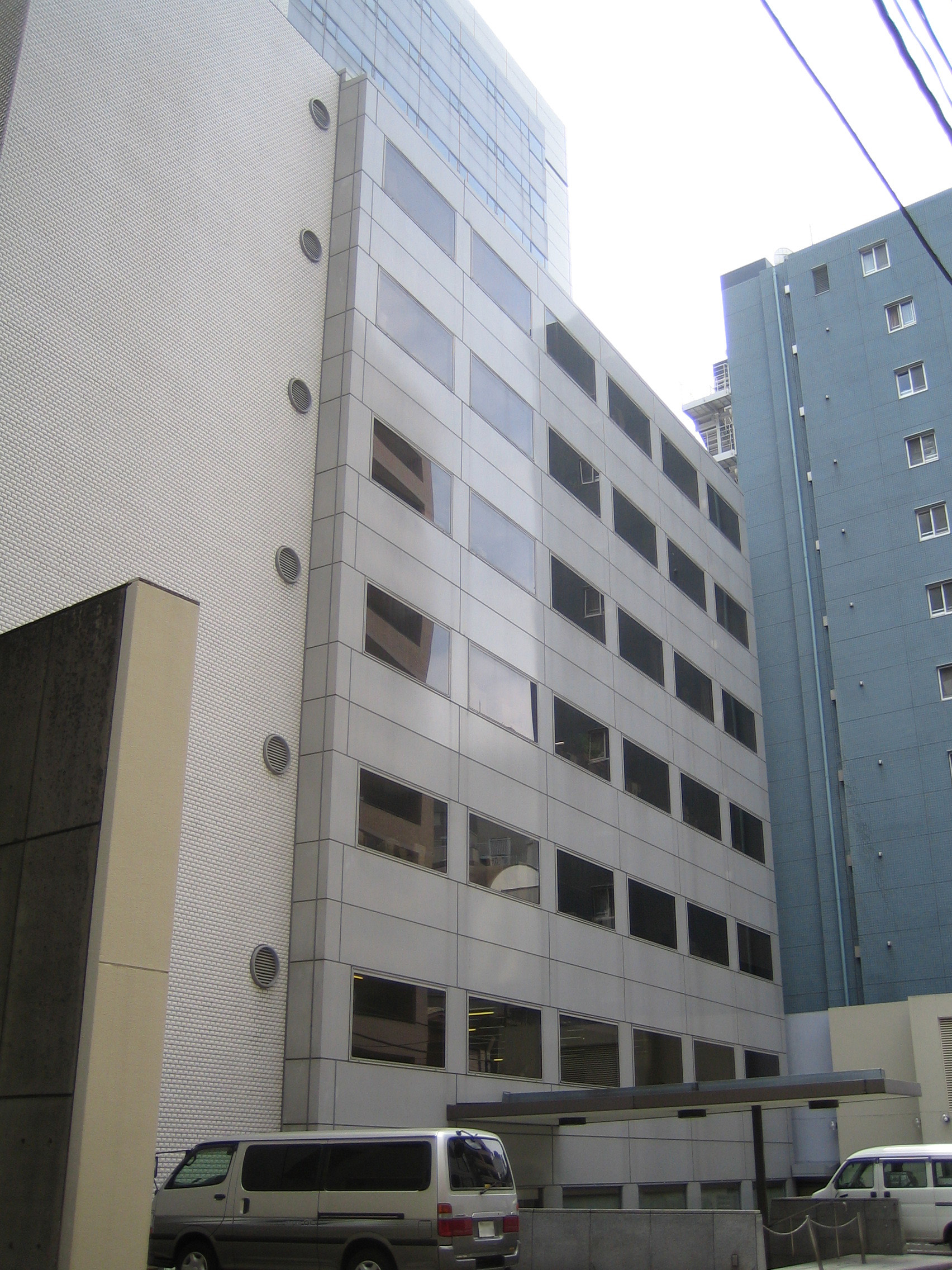
Iwanami Shoten

Iwanami Shigeo founded the publishing firm Iwanami Shoten in the Kanda district of Tokyo in 1913. In its early years, the company published authors such as Natsume Sōseki, Kurata Hyakuzō and Abe Jiro. It also published academic and literary journals in the field of philosophy, including Shijo (1917) and Shicho (1921), science, including Kagaku (1931), and literature, such as Bungaku (1933). In 1927, it launched the Iwanami Bunko (Iwanami Library), a "major series of international works".

During the Second Sino-Japanese War and the Second World War, the firm was repeatedly censored because of its positions against the war and the Emperor. Iwanami Shigeo was even sentenced to two months in prison for the publication of the banned works of Tsuda Sōkichi (a sentence which he did not serve, however). Shortly before his death in 1946, he founded the newspaper Sekai, which had a great influence in post-war Japanese intellectual circles.

In 1955, the company released its Japanese language dictionary, Kōjien, which is highly regarded today and sold more than eleven million copies in 2007. During the post-war decades, it continued to publish numerous foreign classics as well as encyclopedias. In 2010, around 20,000 titles were released by Iwanami Shoten.

== Book series ==
- Iwanami Bunko (岩波文庫) (English, "Iwanami Paperback Library") (1927)
- Iwanami Gendai Bunko (岩波現代文庫) (English, "Iwanami Modern Paperback Library") (2000)
- Iwanami Gendai Zensho (岩波現代全書) (English, "Iwanami Modern Complete Books")
- Iwanami Kōza Sekai Shichō (岩波講座世界思潮) (English, "Iwanami Lectures on Trends in World Thought") (1928) - often referred to in short as Iwanami Koza (岩波講座) (English, "Iwanami Lectures" or "Iwanami Courses")
- Iwanami Shashin Bunko (岩波写真文庫), (English, "Iwanami Photo Library")
- Iwanami Shinsho (岩波新書) (English, "Iwanami Trade Paperbacks")
- Iwanami Sugaku Sosho (岩波数学叢書) (English, "Iwanami Mathematics Series")
- Koza Nihon Eiga (講座・日本映画) (English, "A Course on Japanese Film" or "Lectures on Japanese Film") (1985)
- Nihon Koten Bungaku Taikei (日本古典文学大系) (English, "Japanese Classical Literature System") (1967)
- Yūtopia Ryokō-ki Sōsho (ユートピア旅行記叢書) (English, "Utopia Travel Journal") (1996–2002)
