= Jigoku: Japanese Hell =

- Directed by: Teruo Ishii
- Written by: Teruo Ishii
- Distributed by: OP Eiga
- Release date: 20 November 1999 (Japan)
- Running time: 102 minutes
- Country: Japan
- Language: Japanese

Jigoku: Japanese Hell (地獄; "Hell") is a 1999 Japanese horror film, directed by Teruo Ishii.

== Plot ==
Two young girls get a chance to see what it would be like to be in Hell. While on this tour of Damnation, they see the story of what happens to a man who escaped punishment from the court after raping and murdering several young girls.

Then their own story unfolds before their very eyes. The story of an insane cult in which the blind leader demands tribute from the women and plans mass murder in the belief that the world will be ending soon and they need to help it along.

== Cast ==
- Mutsumi Fujita as Akiko
- Hisayoshi Hirayama as Tsutomu Miyajima
- Michiko Maeda as Enma Daiô
- Yôko Satomi as Miyako Tazawa
- Kenpachirô Satsuma as Ao oni (Blue Ogre)
- Kinako Satô as Rika (credited as Miki Satô)
- Ryûji Takasaki as Aka oni (Red Ogre)
- Tetsurô Tanba as Asu Shino
- Toshimichi Tasaki
- Masato Tsujioka
- Chiho Yoshida as Satomi
