= Blind Beast =

1969 film by Yasuzō Masumura

- Original Japanese release poster
- Directed by: Yasuzo Masumura
- Screenplay by: Yoshio Shirasoka
- Based on: Moju by Rampo Edogawa
- Produced by: Kazumasa Nakano
- Starring: Eiji Funakoshi; Mako Midori; Noriko Sengoku
- Cinematography: Setsuo Kobayashi
- Music by: Hikaru Hayashi
- Production company: Daiei Film
- Release date: 25 January 1969 (Japan)
- Running time: 86 minutes
- Country: Japan
- Language: Japanese

Blind Beast (盲獣, Mōjū), or Moju the Blind Beast, is a 1969 Japanese erotic horror film directed by Yasuzō Masumura. Produced by Kazumasa Nakano for Daiei Film. It is based on a novel by Edogawa Rampo.

== Plot ==
Aki Shima, a fashion model known for her provocative, often BDSM-themed photographs, attends a gallery exhibition of her work. She witnesses a blind sculptor, Michio Sofu, touching a statue of her nude form with unsettling intensity. Aki feels as if his touch is physically on her own body, and leaves, uncomfortable. Michio later kidnaps Aki from her apartment, assisted by his overly protective and emotionally incestuous mother, Shino. Michio takes Aki to a studio he has fashioned out of a massive, abandoned warehouse located far outside of the city.

Aki awakens in Michio's surreal, custom-built "temple of erotic touch." The walls, floor, and ceiling are covered with large, disproportionate sculptures of female body parts. The centerpiece is a pair of monumental, upholstered nude female figures, which Michio uses for his tactile experiments. Michio explains that he was born blind and "sees" the world entirely through touch and sensory memory. He intends to use Aki as his muse to create a new, transcendent form of "sensory art."

Initially, Aki refuses and attempts to escape. Michio forces her to pose so he can sculpt her, studying her body through touch. Their relationship quickly becomes a complex psychological power struggle between captor and captive. Aki attempts to gain control through seduction, taking advantage of Michio's profound vulnerability and sexual inexperience, which stems from his reliance on his mother.

Aki's ploy succeeds, shifting Michio's focus from sculpting her likeness to obsessing over her living body. A jealous Shino tries to secretly let Aki leave, but they are discovered by Michio, leading to a violent confrontation between the three in which Shino is accidentally killed. As Michio mourns over her body, Aki attempts to escape, but Michio recaptures her and angrily berates her for manipulating him. To prove that he is not a "mama's boy" as Aki had called him, he rapes her. Several days later, Michio and Aki bury Shino beneath the studio floor.

Michio finishes his sculpture, and Aki gradually starts developing genuine affection for him. Isolated from the outside world and deprived of natural light, Aki begins to lose her own sense of sight and finally understands the ecstasy Michio experiences from his acute sense of touch. Increasingly hungry for sensation, they engage in more violent acts, eventually weakening their bodies to the brink of death. With the last of her energy, Aki begs Michio to sever all her limbs. Michio complies, dismembering Aki before fatally stabbing himself. In a final voiceover, Aki declares that those who become obsessed with the world of touch can only expect to meet a gruesome end.

== Cast ==
- Eiji Funakoshi as Michio Sofu
- Mako Midori as Aki Shima
- Noriko Sengoku as Shino, Michio's mother

== Production ==
The movie was directed by Yasuzō Masumura, a prominent filmmaker often associated with the Japanese New Wave. He was known for his precise style and bold themes, frequently exploring perversity and social hypocrisy. The film was produced by Daiei Film. The company was reportedly seeking a commercial hit at the time, leading them to commission this sexually charged and sensational adaptation. The film is based on the 1931 novel Mōjū by Rampo Edogawa, one of Japan's most famous authors. The screenplay was written by Yoshio Shirasaka. A significant production element is the surreal and grotesque set design for the blind sculptor's warehouse studio. Art Director Shigeo Mano created a claustrophobic space filled with massive, disturbing sculptures of human body parts (eyes, breasts, limbs), which was highly praised in contemporary reviews. Masumura's film significantly altered the novel's ending. The film introduces a new phase of intense mutual obsession and a final, horrifying act of ritualistic transcendence, providing the female protagonist a voice and a degree of agency, even in death. The lead roles were played by Eiji Funakoshi as Michio Sofu (the blind sculptor) and Mako Midori as Aki Shima (the model).

== Release ==
Blind Beast was released in Japan on January 25, 1969, and sought commercial success by commissioning provocative, exploitation-tinged films, often categorized as pinku eiga (pink film), though Masumura's work often transcends the genre. The film was released by Daiei International Film with English subtitles in April 1969. It was reissued by Roninfilm under the title Warehouse in February 1974 in an attempt to market it to a more general exploitation/horror audience, completely stripping it of its original Japanese context or artistic connection to Rampo's work, which contributed to its obscurity in the West for decades. It was released to Blu-ray in the United States from Arrow Films on August 24, 2021.

== Reception ==
In a contemporary review, Variety praised the cinematography and Shigeo Mano's art direction, while noting that his previous films dealt with sexuality such as Daini no Seo and Manji but "these are kindergarten material compared with The Blind Beast...it's a sick film."

Retrospective reviews include critic Jasper Sharp calling it "One of the most fascinatingly freakish of all the big screen adaptations of the works of Japanese mystery writer Edogawa Rampo". Tom Vick of AllMovie compared the film to The Collector and opined that "Masumura, a master of dark humor and macabre psychodrama, strikes an odd balance between silliness and horror throughout the film. One of the nuttier entries in his oeuvre, Blind Beast is a delicious guilty pleasure." Sight & Sound referred to the film as a "fascinating curiosity" with "bizarre production design, tendency towards outlandish symbolism and eccentric performances, it seems at least partly tongue in cheek even at its most extreme."

== See also ==
- List of Japanese films of 1969
