= 1969 in Japanese television =

Events in 1969 in Japanese television.

== Channels ==
Launches:

- April 1 - Fuji News Network

== Debuts ==
Show	Station	Premiere Date	Genre	Original Run
Flower Action 009-1	Fuji TV	October 7	drama	October 7, 1969 – December 30, 1969
Attack No. 1	Fuji TV	December 7	anime	December 7, 1969 – November 28, 1971
Dororo	Fuji TV	April 6	anime	April 6, 1969 – September 28, 1969
Hakushon Daimaō	Fuji TV	October 5	anime	October 5, 1969 - September 27, 1970
Himitsu no Akko-chan	NET	January 6	anime	January 6, 1969 - October 26, 1970
Kurenai Sanshiro	Fuji TV	April 2	anime	April 2, 1969 – September 24, 1969
Ninpū Kamui Gaiden	Fuji TV	April 6	anime	April 6, 1969 – September 28, 1969
Mito Kōmon	TBS	August 4	jidaigeki	August 4, 1969 – December 19, 2011
Moomin	Fuji TV	October 6	anime	October 6, 1969 - December 27, 1970
Mōretsu Atarō	NET	April 4	anime	April 4, 1969 – December 25, 1970
Sazae-san	Fuji TV	October 5	anime	October 5, 1969 – present
Tiger Mask	Yomiuri TV	October 2	anime	October 2, 1969 – September 30, 1971

== Ongoing shows ==
- Music Fair, music (1964-present)
- Key Hunter, drama (1968–1973)

== Endings ==
Show	Station	Ending Date	Genre	Original Run
Flower Action 009-1	Fuji TV	December 30	drama	October 7, 1969 – December 30, 1969
GeGeGe no Kitaro	Fuji TV	January 3	anime	January 3, 1968 – March 30, 1969
Hyokkori Hyō Tanjima	NHK	April 4	anime	April 6, 1964 - April 4, 1969
Johnny Cypher in Dimension Zero	Fuji TV	March 29	anime	October 21, 1968 – March 29, 1969
Kurenai Sanshiro	Fuji TV	April 2	anime	April 2, 1969 – September 24, 1969
Ninpū Kamui Gaiden	Fuji TV	April 6	anime	April 6, 1969 – September 28, 1969

== See also ==
- 1969 in anime
- 1969 in Japan
- List of Japanese films of 1969
