= Kōtarō Tanaka (judge) =

Japanese jurist and politician (1890-1974)

- 田中 耕太郎
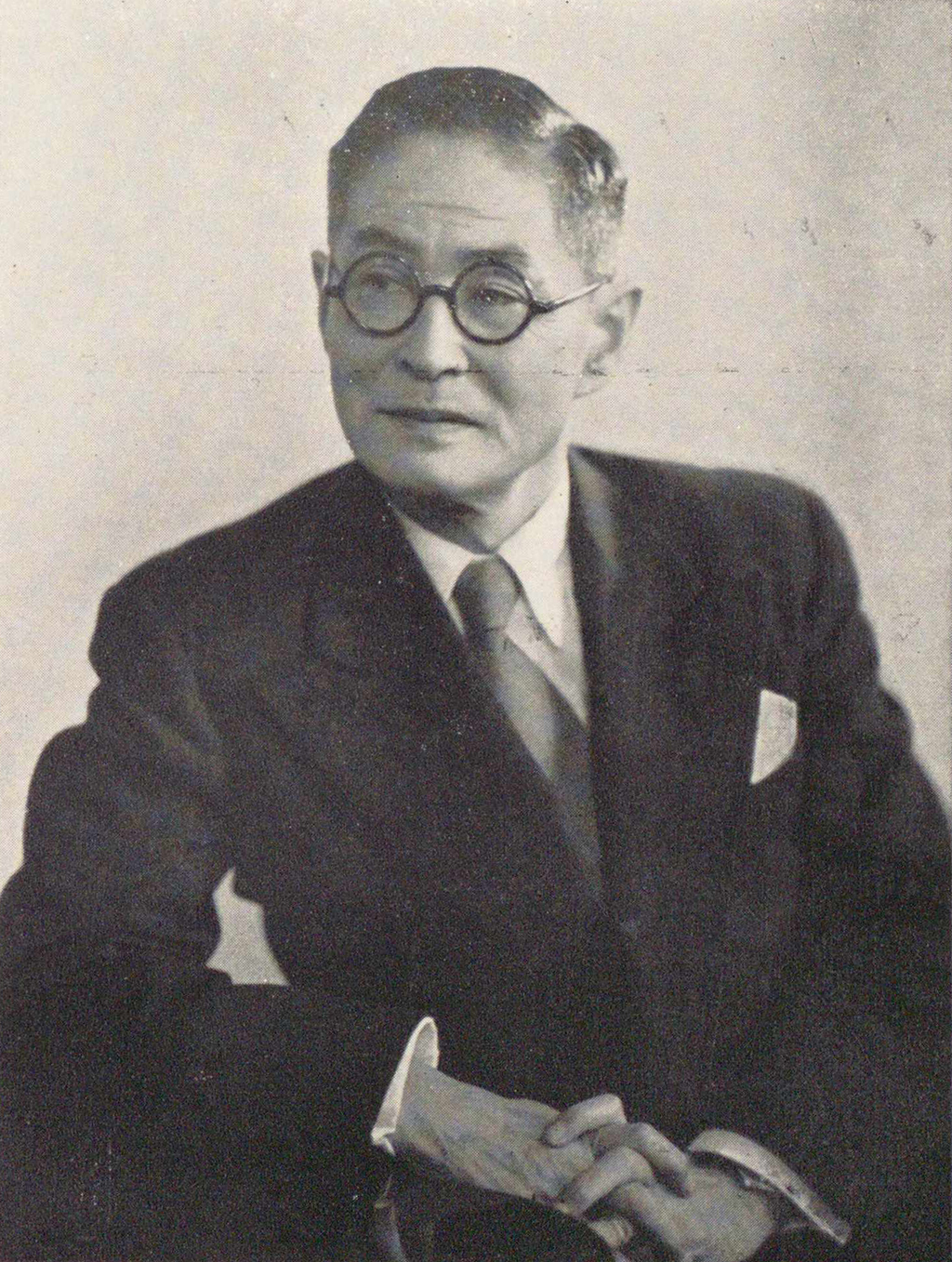
- 1955 portrait

Chief Justice of Japan
- In office 3 March 1950 – 25 October 1960
- Appointed by: Emperor Shōwa
- Preceded by: Tadahiko Mibuchi
- Succeeded by: Kisaburo Yokota

Minister of Education
- In office 22 May 1946 – 31 January 1947
- Prime Minister: Shigeru Yoshida
- Preceded by: Yoshishige Abe
- Succeeded by: Seiichiro Takahashi

Member of the House of Councillors
- In office 3 May 1947 – 1 March 1950
- Preceded by: Constituency established
- Succeeded by: Multi-member district
- Constituency: National district

Member of the House of Peers
- In office 8 June 1946 – 2 May 1947 Nominated by the Emperor

Personal details
- Born: 25 October 1890 Kagoshima, Japan
- Died: 1 March 1974 (aged 83) Shinjuku, Tokyo, Japan
- Party: Ryokufūkai
- Spouse: Mineko Matsumoto
- Relatives: Jōji Matsumoto (father-in-law)
- Education: Tokyo Imperial University

Kōtarō Tanaka (田中耕太郎; 25 October 1890 – 1 March 1974) was a Japanese jurist, professor of law and politician who served as the last Minister of Education of the Empire of Japan and the second postwar Chief Justice of Japan.

== Early life ==
Tanaka was born on 25 October 1890 in Kagoshima, the eldest son of judge Tanaka Hideo, who had been born in Takeo, Saga, in the present-day Saga Prefecture. After completing secondary school in Niigata, he completed high school in Fukuoka and went on to the Imperial Naval Academy. In 1914, he enrolled at the Faculty of Law at Tokyo Imperial University (University of Tokyo) and passed the advanced civil service examinations. He graduated the following year with honours, and was awarded a silver watch from Emperor Taisho. He then worked at the Home Ministry until 1917, when he was appointed an assistant professor at Tokyo Imperial University.

Following studies in Europe and the United States, he was promoted to full professor of commercial law at the university in 1923. The following year, he married Matsumoto Mineko, a devout Catholic who converted him to Catholicism. He was baptized in April 1926 by Fr. William Hoffman, the first president of Sophia University. Subsequently, Tanaka endeavoured to discover positive meanings in national laws, which until then had been regarded as a necessary evil, also working on a "theory of world law." He received his Juris Doctor in 1929 and became dean of the Faculty of Law at Tokyo Imperial University. In 1941, he was elected as an imperial academician (predecessor to the Japan Academy).

In the final months of World War II, Tanaka joined a group of Japanese intellectuals that sought peace with the Allies in opposition to Japan's militarist government.

== Parliamentarian ==
In October 1945, Tanaka became the Director of Education in the Ministry of Education, and joined the first Yoshida cabinet the following May as the last Minister of Education of the Empire of Japan. He was appointed to the House of Peers in June of same year, shortly before its abolition. In 1947, he stood for election to the House of Councillors and won. Among the signatories of the new Japanese Constitution, he was instrumental in drafting the Basic Education Law.

== Chief Justice of Japan ==
After resigning his seat in 1950, Tanaka was appointed Chief Justice of Japan, serving until 1960. He was the first Christian to hold this position, and drew upon his international legal training to interpret the new Japanese Constitution. In 1950, during the first year of his term, he led a Japanese judicial delegation that visited the United States Supreme Court and the New York Court of Appeals.

Tanaka was a friend of U.S. ambassador Douglas MacArthur II. This friendship led to controversy after Tanaka presided over the Supreme Court's December 1959 decision in the "Sunagawa Case," which ruled that Article 9 of the Japanese Constitution did not preclude Japan from taking certain defensive measures, and enabled the ongoing United States military presence in Japan by refusing to clearly declare it constitutional or unconstitutional. It was later learned from declassified American diplomatic cables that Tanaka met with MacArthur several times to discuss the trial prior to issuing the ruling; the cables also indicated that Tanaka pressured his fellow justices to follow his position. The Tokyo District Court upheld the Supreme Court's decision in 2016, refusing to allow a retrial.

Tanaka wrote the 1957 Supreme Court decision that banned the book Lady Chatterley's Lover in Japan on the basis that it offended public standards of decency.

== International Court of Justice ==
In 1961, Tanaka was appointed as a jurist on the International Court of Justice at the Hague. During his time on the court, he participated in eight contentious cases and appended two joint declarations, two separate opinions and two dissenting opinions.

Tanaka is today most remembered for his dissenting opinion in 1966 regarding the South West Africa cases, in which he supported the applicants' argument (rejected by the broader Court) that international legal norms prohibited the South African practice of apartheid. Tanaka concluded that UN member states had "the legal obligation to respect human rights and fundamental freedoms." Writing in 1996, A.P. Vijapur described Tanaka's dissenting opinion as "probably the best exposition of the concept of equality in existing literature."

== Later life and death ==
Tanaka died in 1974 at St. Mary's Hospital in Tokyo, aged 83.

== Honours ==
=== Japanese ===
- Order of Culture (3 November 1960)
- Grand Cordon of the Order of the Rising Sun (29 April 1964)
- Grand Cordon of the Order of the Rising Sun with Paulownia Flowers (29 April 1970)
- Grand Cordon of the Order of the Chrysanthemum (3 March 1974; posthumous)

=== Order of precedence ===
- Senior second rank (3 March 1974; posthumous)

=== Foreign honours ===
- Italian Order of Merit for Culture and Art (1958)
- Grand Cross of Merit of the Order of the Federal Republic of Germany (1960)
