= Ekizo Fujibayashi =

Japanese lawyer (1907–2007)

Ekizo Fujibayashi (藤林 益三, Fujibayashi Ekizō; August 26, 1907 – April 24, 2007) was the 7th Chief Justice of Japan (1976–1977) and a recipient of the Order of the Rising Sun.

He was born in Kyoto Prefecture and graduated from the University of Tokyo in 1931. Early in his career, he worked as a corporate attorney; he was the first practicing attorney to become Chief Justice of Japan. He returned to law practice in 1977 following his resignation.

Fujibayashi was a non-denominational Christian and followed the non-church movement.

Preceded by Tomokazu Murakami	Chief Justice of Japan; 1976–1977	Succeeded by Masao Okahara

== Bibliography ==
- 交詢社 第69版 『日本紳士録』 1986年
- 山本祐司『最高裁物語』（日本評論社、1994）講談社+α文庫、1997）
