= Yōko Matsuyama =

Japanese actress

- 松山 容子
- Born: 30 November 1937 (age 88); Matsuyama, Ehime, Japan
- Occupation: Actress

Yōko Matsuyama (松山 容子, Matsuyama Yōko; born 30 November 1937 in Matsuyama, Ehime, Japan) is a Japanese actress best known for her work in the Crimson Bat series.

== Filmography ==
- Crimson Bat (紅蝙蝠, Kurenai Kawahori) (1958)
- Meiji fuusetsu: Yawara sempuu (明治の風雪 柔旋風) (1965)
- Tsuzuki yawara sempuu: Shitennou tanjyou (続・柔旋風 四天王誕生) (1965)
- Crimson Bat (めくらのお市物語, Mekura no Oichi monogatari)
  1. Crimson Bat: The Blind Swordsman (めくらのお市物語 真っ赤な流れ鳥, Mekura no Oichi monogatari: Makkana nagaradori) (1969)
  2. Trapped, the Crimson Bat (めくらのお市 地獄肌, Mekurano no Oichi jigokuhada) (1969)
  3. Watch Out, Crimson Bat! (めくらのお市 みだれ笠, Mekurano no Oichi midaregasa) (1969)
  4. Crimson Bat - Oichi: Wanted, Dead or Alive (めくらのお市 命貰います, Mekurano no Oichi inochi moraimasu) (1970)
