= Shogun's Joy of Torture =

- Poster of Shogun's Joy of Torture (1968)
- Directed by: Teruo Ishii
- Written by: Teruo Ishii
- Starring: Teruo Yoshida; Fumio Watanabe
- Cinematography: Motoya Washyo
- Music by: Masao Yagi
- Distributed by: Toei
- Release date: September 28, 1968
- Running time: 96 minutes
- Country: Japan
- Language: Japanese

Shogun's Joy of Torture (徳川女刑罰史, Tokugawa onna keibatsu-shi; Tokugawa Era Female Punishment) is a 1968 Japanese ero guro film directed by Teruo Ishii and distributed by Toei. The film, which can be classified as belonging to a subgenre of pink films, is considered a precursor to Toei's ventures into the "pinky violent" style of filmmaking seen in the early 1970s. It was followed by Shogun's Sadism in 1976.

== Plot ==
A historian warns, “if judicial cruelty is not diminished, we can turn wild and cruel again”.

In Edo period Japan, Judge Yoshioka reflects upon prior cases in which torture was utilized. He evokes the three following stories.

=== First segment ===
Mitsu lives with her brother Shinzô. One day, Shinzô is injured in a logging accident and a local kimono shop owner, Minosuke, pays for his doctor’s fees. Mitsu is reminded that she is indebted to Minosuke and, one night while visiting, is raped by him.

Shinzô realizes what transpired when she returns late and resolves to kill Minosuke, only to be stopped by Mitsu. They confess their mutual feelings for each other and begin an incestuous relationship.

Minosuke visits and witnesses the two embracing, using the relationship as blackmail and raping Mitsu in front of Shinzô. The next day, Mitsu finds Shinzô has committed suicide with a straight razor. When Minosuke arrives, Mitsu chases him down the street, assaulting him with a straight razor.

Arrested for the assault, Mitsu is interrogated with torture by the authorities, led by Lord Nanbara about the rumor of an incestuous relationship. Presented before Judge Yoshioka, who bears a striking resemblance to her brother, it is revealed that Minosuke confessed to raping Mitsu. She is presented with the option of refuting Minosuke’s claims of incest for a lighter sentence of exile, but she instead confesses to the incest and is executed by being crucified upside down in a rising tide.

=== Second segment ===
In Juko temple, an abbess, Myoshin has a sexual rendezvous with a priest, Shunkai, and is spied on by the Abbess, Reiho. Reiho confronts Shunkai and orders him to pray naked under a waterfall. After seducing him and having sex, Shunkai informs Reiho that they can’t be punished because they’ve both committed the same act.

Regardless, Reiho pursues in torturing Myoshin in front of a subdued Shunkai. This culminates in the abbesses killing Myoshin by burning her genitals with a hot poker. Shunkai spurns Reiho’s advances and she decapitates him.

Meanwhile, the local authorities have gathered wind about the temple’s depravity and raid it. Reiho stabs herself rather than be captured. Nanbara and Yoshioka witness the executions of the remaining abbesses.

=== Third segment ===
Horicho is a renowned tattoo artist working in Edo, admired for his pieces depicting hellish torments. At a showing for his latest work, everyone is impressed sans Lord Nanbara who stops by, critiquing Horicho’s tattoo as lacking the pleasure inherent in torture.

Horicho elects a bathhouse owner to help him in finding a woman with beautiful skin for his next work. He finally identifies Hana as having the most beautiful skin, who he later knocks out and drugs to begin tattooing her. Visiting Nanbara, Horicho asks to be shown torture up close and is allowed to join Nanbara on his trip to Nagasaki.

By this time, Hana has imprinted on Horicho and is obedient. Nanbara takes them to a barn where the authorities have gathered a group of shipwrecked Dutch Christian women and begins torturing them under the pretense of spreading Christianity in Japan.

Horicho begins his tattoo on Hana, using the torture as inspiration. He requests using Nanbara as a model to depict the tattoo’s ogreish expressions. Asking to see Nanbara’s wakazashi, Nanbara makes the other authorities leave, upon which Horicho stabs Nanbara, stating a torturer should feel the agony he inflicts on his victims. Using Nanbara’s death throes as the last piece of inspiration, Horicho finishes his tattoo and dubs it his masterpiece.

Upon finding the scene, the authorities attempt to arrest Horicho, who sets a fire inside the barn. Yoshioka rescues Hana from the blaze, though Horicho is left inside to succumb to the fire.

== Cast ==
=== 1st segment ===
- Teruo Yoshida as Shinzô/Judge Yoshioka
- Fumio Watanabe as Ichinoshin Nanbara
- Kinji Nakamura
- Masumi Tachibana as Mitsu
- Ken Sawaaki

=== 2nd segment ===
- Yuki Kagawa as Reihô
- Miki Obana as Myôshin

=== 3d segment ===
- Asao Koike as Horichô
- Reiko Mikasa as Hana

== Release ==
The film premiered theatrically on September 28, 1968.

=== Home media ===
In May 2005, Shogun's Joy of Torture was released on region 1 DVD.

In February 2021 the film was released on region A&B Blu-ray by Arrow Video in the US and UK.
