= Aiko Takahama =

Japanese professional shogi player

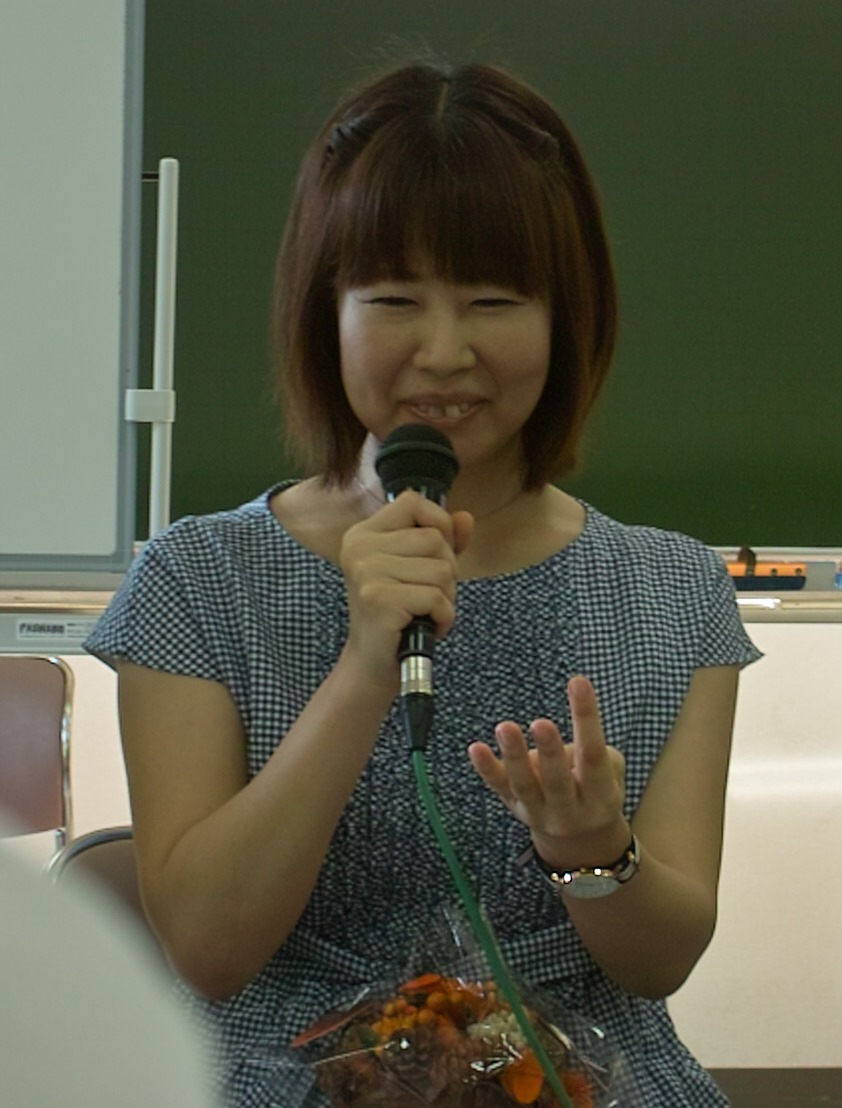
- Takahama in 2016
- Native name: 高浜愛子
- Born: October 2, 1984 (age 42)
- Hometown: Fukushima-ku, Osaka, Japan

Career
- Achieved professional status: February 5, 2016 (aged 31)
- Badge number: W-54
- Rank: Women's 1-dan
- Teacher: Shin'ya Yamamoto (6-dan)

Websites
- JSA profile page

Aiko Takahama (高浜 愛子, Takahama Aiko; born October 2, 1984) is a Japanese women's professional shogi player ranked 1-dan.

== Women's shogi professional ==
=== Promotion history ===
Takahama's promotion history is as follows:

- 3-kyū: April 1, 2014
- 2-kyū: February 5, 2016
- 1-kyū: September 17, 2021
- 1-dan: April 1, 2024

Note: All ranks are women's professional ranks.
