= Mako Midori =

Japanese actress (born 1944)

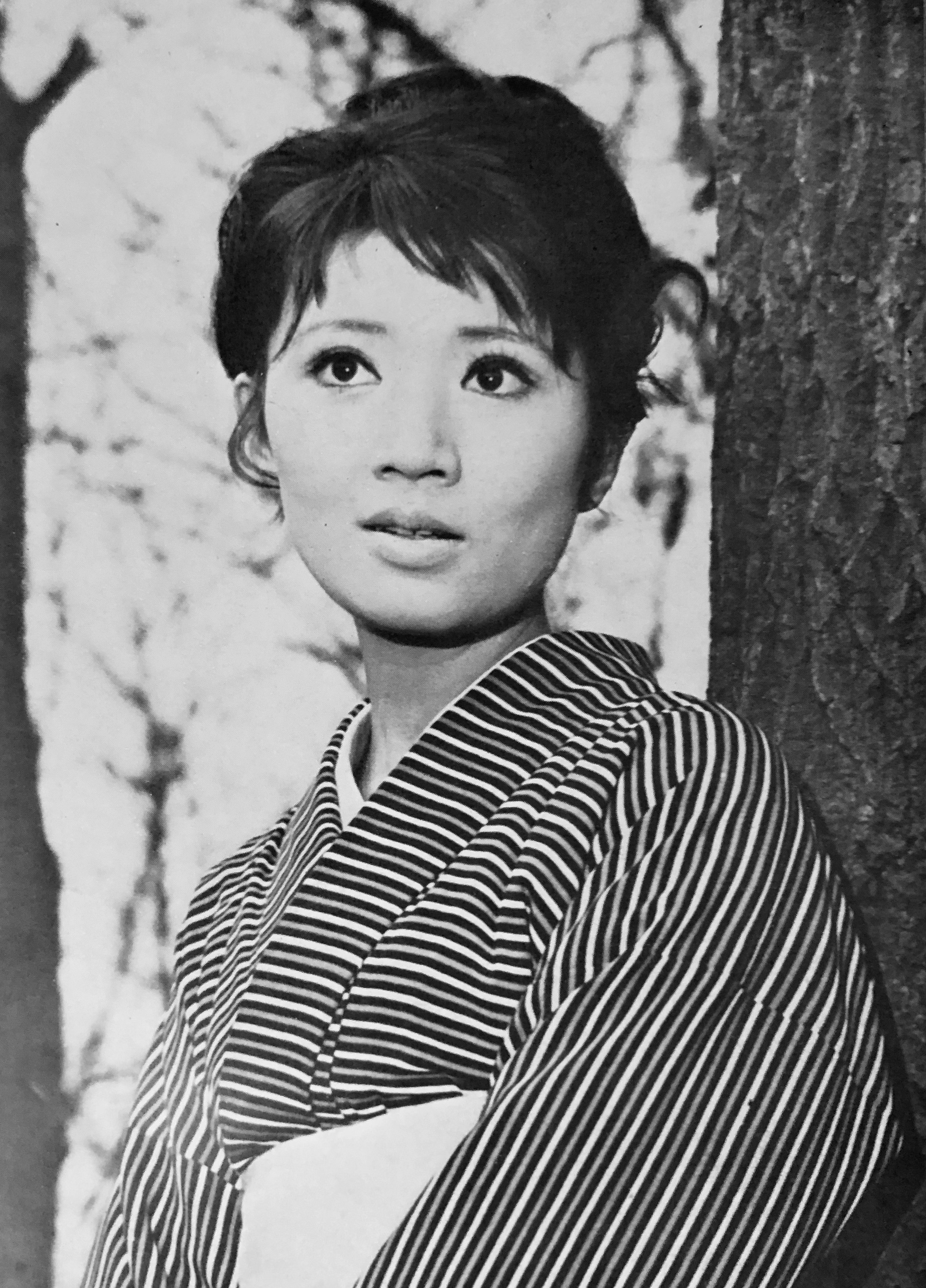
- Midori in 1965
- Born: March 26, 1944 (age 82); Taipei City, Taiwan
- Occupation: Actress
- Years active: 1963–present
- Spouse: Renji Ishibashi (m. 1979)

Mako Midori (緑 魔子, Midori Mako; born 26 March 1944, Taiwan) is a Japanese actress. Debuting on film in 1964, she won the Blue Ribbon Award for best new face for Nihiki no mesuinu. Beyond appearing in over fifty Japanese language films in the 1960s and 1970s, she has also acted extensively on stage, winning major awards such as the Kinokuniya Theatre Prize. She is married to Renji Ishibashi.

== Films ==
- Blind Beast
- Kunoichi Keshō (1964)
- Three Resurrected Drunkards (1968)
- The Gate of Youth: Part 2 (1982)

== Television ==
- Daitsuiseki
- Tokyo Megure Keishi (episode 6)
- Tantei Monogatari (episode 1)
- Playgirl
- Monkey as the Locust Queen in episode "Land for the Locusts"
