= Shin'ya Yamamoto =

Japanese shogi player

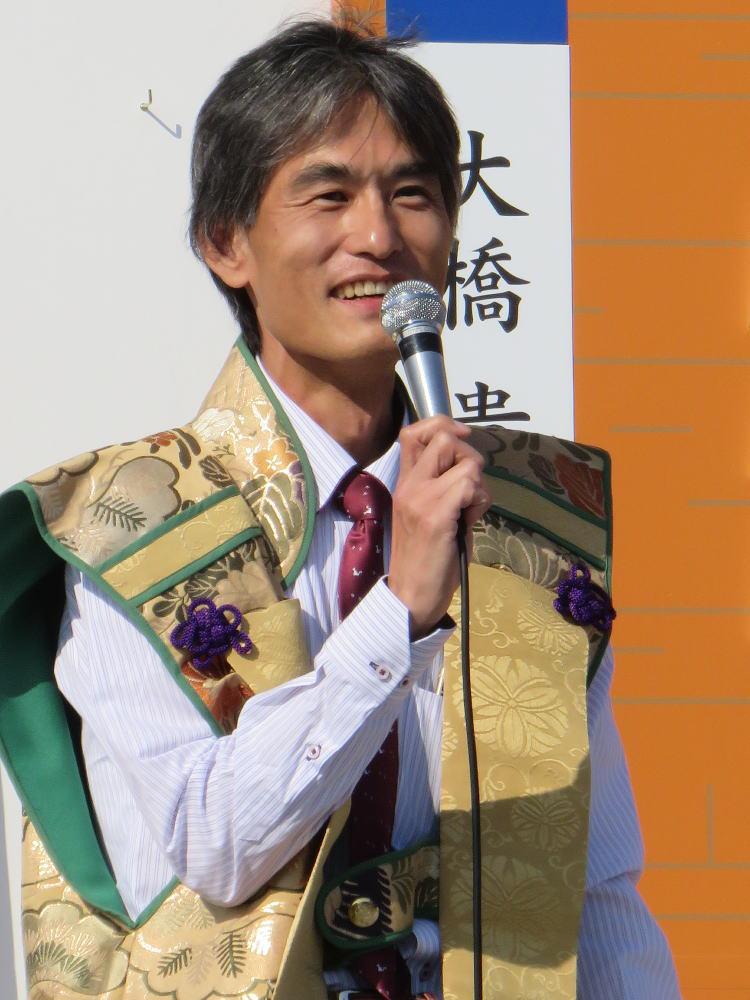
- Yamanoto at a human shogi event in November 2018.
- Native name: 山本真也
- Born: October 24, 1971 (age 53)
- Hometown: Higashiōsaka

Career
- Achieved professional status: October 1, 1998 (aged 26)
- Badge Number: 229
- Rank: 6-dan
- Teacher: Fumio Kitamura (7-dan)
- Meijin class: Free
- Ryūō class: 6
- Notable students: Aiko Takahama

Websites
- JSA profile page

Shin'ya Yamamoto (山本 真也, Yamamoto Shin'ya; born October 24, 1971) is a Japanese professional shogi player ranked 6-dan.

== Shogi professional ==
=== Promotion history ===
The promotion history for Yamamoto is as follows:

- 6-kyū: 1986
- 1-dan: 1989
- 4-dan: October 1, 1998
- 5-dan: November 5, 2004
- 6-dan: April 1, 2016
