= Masatoshi Yokota =

Masatoshi Yokota (Japanese: 横田正俊, romanized: Yokota Masatoshi; January 11, 1899 – July 1, 1984) was the 4th Chief Justice of Japan (1966–1969). He was born in Hakodate, Hokkaido. He graduated from the University of Tokyo. He was a recipient of the Order of the Rising Sun. He was a practitioner of kendo.

Preceded by Kisaburo Yokota	Chief Justice of Japan; 1966–1969	Succeeded by Kazuto Ishida

== Bibliography ==
- 山本祐司『最高裁物語（上・下）』（日本評論社、1994年）（講談社+α文庫、1997年）
