= Kazuto Ishida =

5th Chief Justice of Japan

Kazuto Ishida (Japanese: 石田和外; May 20, 1903 – May 9, 1979) was a Japanese jurist who served as Chief Justice of the Supreme Court of Japan from 1969 to 1973. He was a practitioner of kendo. He was a graduate of the University of Tokyo.

As an associate justice in the mid-1960s, Ishida penned a dissenting opinion in a Grand Bench decision limiting criminal prosecution of labor leaders. This was a contributing factor to his appointment as Chief Justice by Prime Minister Eisaku Sato in 1968, in an attempt to give the court more conservative leadership at a time when Japan saw massive radical student demonstrations. One of Ishida's final decisions, in 1973, expanded police powers to punish demonstrators. Ishida's court was the first in a line of conservative Supreme Court benches that continued into the early 21st century.

After his tenure as Chief Justice, Ishida became chairman of the All Japan Kendo Federation. He also became the first chairman of the Eirei ni Kotaeru Kai (英霊にこたえる会, Society to Honour the War Dead), which supports Yasukuni Shrine, in June 1976.

Ishida formed the National Congress to Achieve Legislation of the Gengo System in order to establish a law formalizing the system of imperial era names.

Ishida was a recipient of the Order of the Rising Sun.

== Bibliography ==
- 山本祐司『最高裁物語（上・下）』（日本評論社、1994年）（講談社+α文庫、1997年）

Preceded by Masatoshi Yokota	Chief Justice of Japan; 1969–1973	Succeeded by Tomokazu Murakami
