= Teruo Ishii =

Japanese film director (1924–2005)

- Film director Teruo Ishii
- Born: January 1, 1924; Tokyo, Japan
- Died: August 12, 2005 (aged 81); Tokyo, Japan
- Occupation: Film director
- Years active: 1957–2001

Teruo Ishii (石井輝男, Ishii Teruo; January 1, 1924 – August 12, 2005) was a Japanese film director best known in the West for his early films in the Super Giant series, and for his films in the ero guro ("erotic-grotesque") subgenre of sexploitation such as Shogun's Joy of Torture (1968). He also directed the 1965 film Abashiri Prison, which helped to make Ken Takakura a major star in Japan. Referred to in Japan as "The King of Cult", Ishii had a much more prolific and eclectic career than was generally known in the West during his lifetime.

== Early life ==
Born in Tokyo's Asakusa neighborhood in 1924, Ishii developed a love of cinema early. His parents would often take him to see foreign films, particularly French movies. He cited the works of Julien Duvivier, Marcel Carné, Jacques Becker, Alfred Hitchcock, Mikio Naruse and Hiroshi Shimizu as influences. Ishii worked at Toho Studios as an assistant director beginning in 1942. His film career was interrupted when he was sent to Manchuria during World War II to take aerial photographs for bombing runs.

== Shintoho ==
In March, 1947 Ishii joined the newly founded Shintoho studios. Ishii would later recall his time with Shintoho as, "without doubt the most joyful period of my professional life." While at Shintoho he worked as assistant director to Mikio Naruse, whom he considered his mentor for the rest of his career. He also worked for director Hiroshi Shimizu and studied script writing with Shinichi Sekizawa, best known in the West for his entries in the Godzilla series. Ishii's directorial debut was in 1957 with the boxing film King of the Ring: The World of Glory (Ring no Oja: Eiko no Sekai).

He was next assigned to direct six installments in the children's science-fiction series, Super Giant. This nine-episode series was later re-packaged into four films for U.S. syndicated television as Starman. From 1958 to 1961 Ishii directed four films in the film-noir Line (Chitai) series. For the last of these films, Sexy Line (Sexy Chitai) (1961), Ishii took his cameras to the streets of Asakusa and Ginza, in order to film real life on location. The film has been called "sharp, witty and contagious" and "a lively portrait of the Tokyo underworld, populated by hookers, johns, crooks and cops and shot in cinéma-verité style."

== Toei ==
Shintoho declared bankruptcy in 1961, forcing Ishii to seek employment at another studio. He moved to Toei Company where he directed Flower and Storm and Gang (Hana to Arashi to Gang) (1961), starring Ken Takakura. His 1965 Abashiri Bangaichi with Takakura would solidify that actor's stardom and give Ishii his biggest success of the 1960s. Ishii would go on to direct 10 of the 18 films in this series.

In 1968, Ishii initiated two popular, long-running series for Toei. In the first entry in the Hot Springs Geisha series (1968–1972), Ishii successfully replaced his usual "darkly sardonic cinematic style in favor of this light and frivolous 'mainstream' comedy about geisha masseuses operating inside a hotsprings resort." Ishii left this series to other directors. The Joys of Torture series (1968–1973), however, suited Ishii's taste. Beginning with Shogun's Joy of Torture (1968), Ishii directed all eight entries in the series, which examined the history of torture in Japan. A fan of the work of horror and suspense author Edogawa Rampo since childhood, Ishii adapted many of his horror stories into his films of this period, including Horrors of Malformed Men. The term ero-guro ("erotic-grotesque"), used to describe Rampo's writings, was also applied to Ishii's style in these films, and the term is still used to describe the most extreme of the S&M films in Japan. Of these, the Weissers comment, "The Ishii Torture movies are still the best-made, rivaled only by certain Kōji Wakamatsu productions (especially Torture Chronicles: 100 Years (1975)), a few from Masaru Konuma (i.e., Wife to be Sacrificed and Flower and Snake (both 1974)) and Go Ijuin's Captured For Sex 2 (1986)."

Ishii worked in several of Toei's popular genres during the 1970s, including a Pinky violent film with Reiko Ike, Female Yakuza Tale: Inquisition and Torture (1973), and one of Sonny Chiba's films in the mid-1970s, The Executioner (Chokugeki! Jigoku-ken). Ishii made two contributions to the biker genre with Detonation! Violent Riders (1975) and Detonation! Violent Games (1976). After 1979 Ishii stopped making theatrical films and worked mainly for television during the 1980s.

== Later career ==
Ishii returned to Toei in 1991 with the V-cinema film The Hit Man: Blood Smells Like Roses. In 1993 he made a film of Yoshiharu Tsuge's manga, Master of the Gensenkan Inn (Gensenkan Shujin), and in 1998 he filmed Tsuge's avant-garde manga, Wind-Up Type (Nejishiki). In 1999 he made Jigoku: Japanese Hell, using the trial of Aum sect leader Shoko Asahara as the main inspiration for the plot. Ishii's last film, The Blind Beast Vs The Dwarf (2001) was another based on the work of Edogawa Rampo.

Largely unknown outside Japan during much of his career, late in life, Ishii's work was discovered and gained admirers in the West. Ishii attended festivals devoted to his films given at the Far East Film Festival in Udine and at the Étrange Festival in France. In his later years, Ishii often spoke of a dream project, a gangster epic with Ken Takakura to be called Once Upon a Time in Japan. Ishii died August 12, 2005, before that project ever became a reality. Directing in a wide range of genres throughout his career, including martial arts, science fiction, horror, erotica, and film noir, Ishii's 83 films are a microcosm of popular cinematic trends in Japan during the second half of the twentieth century.

== Filmography ==
Film title	Company	Genre	Release date
リングの王者 栄光の世界; Ring no Oja: Eiko no Sekai	Shintoho		1957-04-10
The Steelman from Outer Space, Super Giant 1 鋼鉄の巨人	Shintoho		1957-07-30
Super Giant 2 続鋼鉄の巨人	Shintoho		1957-08-13
Invaders From the Planets, Super Giant 3 鋼鉄の巨人 怪星人の魔城; Super Giants Kaiseijin no Majo	Shintoho		1957-10-01
The Earth in Danger, Super Giant 4 鋼鉄の巨人 地球滅亡寸前; Super Giants Chikyu Metsubo Sunzen	Shintoho		1957-10-08
Nude Actress Murder Case: Five Criminals 肉体女優殺し 五人の犯罪者; Nikutai joyū koroshi: Go-nin no hanzaisha	Shintoho		1957-11-10
Spaceship of Human Destruction, Super Giant 5 スーパー・ジャイアンツ 人工衛星と人類の破滅; Super Giants Jinko Eisen to Jinrui no Hametsu	Shintoho		1957-12-28
Destruction of the Space Fleet, Super Giants 6 スーパー・ジャイアンツ 宇宙艇と人工衛星の激突; Super Giants Uchutei to Jinko Eisen no Kekitotsu	Shintoho		1958-01-03
天城心中 天国に結ぶ恋; Amagi Shinju Tengoku ni Musubu Koi	Shintoho		1958-01-26
Fresh Pier 女体棧橋; Jotai Senbashi	Shintoho		1958-04-12
White Line 白線秘密地帯; Shirosen Himitsu Chitai	Shintoho		1958-09-21
Return of the Queen Bee 女王蜂の怒り; Jobachi no Ikari	Shintoho		1958-12-28
Broken Blossoms 戦場のなでしこ; Senjo no Nadeshiko	Shintoho		1959-02-25
猛吹雪の死闘; Mofubuki no Shito	Shintoho		1959-04-29
日本ロマンス旅行; Nippon Romance Ryoko: Sapporo Han	Shintoho		1959-04-29
Black Line 黒線地帯; Kurosen Chitai	Shintoho		1960-01-13
Girls without Return Tickets 女体渦巻島; Nyotai Uzumaki Shima	Shintoho		1960-02-27
Yellow Line 黄線地帯 イエローライン; Osen Chitai	Shintoho		1960-04-29
Queen Bee and the Dragons 女王蜂と大学の龍; Jobachi to Daigaku no Ryū	Shintoho		1960-09-01
Sexy Line セクシー地帯; Sexy Chitai	Shintoho		1961-01-09
恋愛ズバリ講座 第三話; Ren'ai Zubari Koza	Shintoho		1961-01-21
Flower and Storm and Gang, Gang 1 花と嵐とギャング; Hana to Arashi to Gang	Toei		1961-06-23
霧と影; Kiri to Kage	Toei		1961-08-26
黄色い風土; Kiiroi Fudo	Toei		1961-09-23
Gang 2 恋と太陽とギャング; Koi to Taiyo to Gang	Toei		1962-03-21
The G-men of the Pacific 太平洋のGメン; Taiheiyo no G-men	Toei		1962-04-22
Boss of the Underworld: Gang of 11, Gang 5 暗黒街の顔役 十一人のギャング; Ankokugai no Kaoyaku: Juichinin no Gang	Toei		1963-01-15
Gang 6 ギャング対Gメン 集団金庫破り; Gang tai G-men: Shudan Kinko Yaburi	Toei		1963-02-23
Kill the Boss 親分を倒せ; Oyabun wo Taose	Toei		1963-06-22
昭和侠客伝; Showa Kyokakuden	Toei		1963-10-05
Gang 9, Tokyo Gang versus Hong Kong Gang 東京ギャング対香港ギャング; Tokyo Gang tai Hong Kong Gang	Toei		1964-01-01
ならず者; Narazu-mono	Toei		1964-04-05
御金蔵破り; Gokinzo yaburi	Toei		1964-08-13
いれずみ突撃隊; Irezumi Totsugekitai	Toei		1964-10-21
顔役; Kaoyaku	Toei		1965-01-03
Abashiri Prison 網走番外地; Abashiri Bangaichi	Toei		1965-04-18
続網走番外地; Zoku Abashiri Bangaichi	Toei		1965-07-10
網走番外地 望郷篇; Abashiri Bangaichi: Bokyohen	Toei		1965-10-31
網走番外地 北海篇; Abashiri Bangaichi: Hokkai-hen	Toei		1965-12-31
日本ゼロ地帯 夜を狙え; Nippon Zero Chitai: Yoru wo Nerae	Shochiku		1966-03-05
Abashiri Prison: Duel in the Wind 網走番外地 荒野の対決; Abashiri Bangaichi: Koya no Taiketsu	Toei		1966-04-23
Big Villain Plan 大悪党作戦; Daiakuto Sakusen	Shochiku		1966-07-09
網走番外地 南国の対決; Abashiri Bangaichi: Nangoku no Taiketsu	Toei		1966-08-13
神火101 殺しの用心棒; Shinka 101: Koroshi no Yojimbo	Shochiku		1966-12-23
網走番外地 大雪原の対決; Abashiri Bangaichi: Dai-setsugen no Taiketsu	Toei		1966-12-30
網走番外地 決斗零下30度; Abashiri Bangaichi: Ketto Reika 30-do	Toei		1967-04-20
決着; Otoshimae	Toei		1967-05-20
Abashiri Prison: Challenge for Glory 網走番外地 悪への挑戦; Abashiri Bangaichi: Aku Eno Chosen	Toei		1967-08-12
Abashiri Prison: Duel in the Snow Storm 網走番外地 吹雪の斗争; Abashiri Bangaichi: Fubuki no Toso	Toei		1967-12-23
続決着; Zoku Otoshimae	Toei		1968-03-30
徳川女系図; Tokugawa Onna Keizu	Toei		1968-05-01
温泉あんま芸者; Onsen Anma Geisha	Toei		1968-06-28
Shogun's Joy of Torture 徳川女刑罰史; Tokugawa Onna Keibatsushi	Toei		1968-09-28
Orgies of Edo 残酷異常虐待物語 元禄女系図; Zankoku Ijo Gyakutai Monogatari Genroku Jokeizu	Toei		1969-01-09
Shameless: Abnormal and Abusive Love 異常性愛記録 ハレンチ; Ijo Seai Kiroku Harenchi	Toei		1969-02-21
The Friendly Killer 昇り竜鉄火肌; Noboriryu Tekkahada	Nikkatsu		1969-03-29
Inferno of Torture / Hell's Tattooers 徳川いれずみ師 責め地獄; Tokugawa Irezumishi Seme Jigoku	Toei		1969-05-02
Yakuza's Law: Yakuza Keibatsushi: Rinchi やくざ刑罰史 私刑; Yakuza Keibatsushi: Lynch!	Toei		1969-06-27
Love and Crime 明治大正昭和 猟奇女犯罪史; Meiji Taisho Showa Ryoki Onna Hanzaishi	Toei		1969-08-27
Horrors of Malformed Men 江戸川乱歩全集 恐怖奇形人間; Edogawa Rampo Zenshu Kyofu Kikei Ningen	Toei		1969-10-31
殺し屋人別帳; Koroshiya ninbetsucho	Toei		1970-01-31
監獄人別帳; Kangoku ninbetsucho	Toei		1970-04-10
Blind Woman's Curse 怪談昇り竜; Kaidan Nobori Ryū	Nikkatsu		1970-06-20
緋ぢりめん博徒; Hijirimen Bakuto	Toei		1972-11-21
ポルノ時代劇 忘八武士道; Bohachi Bushido: Code of the Forgotten Eight	Toei		1973-02-03
Female Yakuza Tale: Inquisition and Torture やさぐれ姐御伝 総括リンチ; Yasagure Anago Den: Sokatsu Lynch	Toei		1973-06-07
現代任侠史; Gendai Ninkyo-shi	Toei		1973-10-27
Direct Hit! Hell Fist, Executioner 直撃! 地獄拳; Chokugeki! Jigokuhen	Toei		1974-08-10
The Karate Inferno 直撃地獄拳 大逆転; Chokugeki Jigokuhen: Dai Gyakuten	Toei		1974-12-28
大脱獄; Daidatsugoku	Toei		1975-04-05
爆発! 暴走族; Bakuhatsu! Bosozoku	Toei		1975-09-20
実録三億円事件 時効成立; Jitsuroku 3 Okuen Jiken: Jiko Seiritsu	Toei		1975-11-22
爆発! 暴走遊戯; Bakuhatsu! Boso Yugi	Toei		1976-01-15
キンキンのルンペン大将; Kinkin no Lumpen Taisho	Toei		1976-04-24
暴走の季節; Boso no Kisetsu	Toei		1976-07-01
惑星ロボ ダンガードA対昆虫ロボット軍団; Wakusei Robot Dangard A tai Konchu Robot Gundan	Toei		1977-07-17
暴力戦士; Boryoku Senshi	Toei		1979-10-06
The Hitman: Blood Smells Like Roses ザ・ヒットマン 血はバラの匂い; The Hitman: Chi wa Bara no Nioi	Toei Video		1991-06-14
ゲンセンカン主人; Tsuge Yoshiharu World: Gensenkan Shujin	Kinoshita Eiga		1993-07-24
Vagabond Plain 無頼平野; Burai Heiya	Wides Publishing; M.M.I.		1995-05-29
Screwed / Wind-Up Type ねじ式; Nejishiki	Teruo Ishii Productions		1998-07-18
Japanese Hell / Hell 地獄; Jigoku	Teruo Ishii Productions		1999-11-20
Blind Beast vs. Dwarf / Blind Beast versus Issue Boshi 盲獣vs一寸法師 Môjû tai Issunbôshi	Teruo Ishii Productions		2001-06-24

== Sources ==
- Curti, Roberto (May 31, 2003). "Roman Porno Revisited: Teruo Ishii, the Outcast".
- D., Chris. "Ishii, Teruo, Biography". www.pinky-violence.com.
- "石井輝男 (Ishii Teruo)" (in Japanese). [Japanese Movie Database].
- Mes, Tom (January 28, 2005). "Tom Mes interviews Ishii at Midnight Eye". www.midnighteye.com.
- Schilling, Mark (2003). The Yakuza Movie Book: A Guide to Japanese Gangster Films. Berkeley, California: Stone Bridge Press. pp. 55–70. ISBN 1-880656-76-0.
- Stern, Michaël (July 2007). "Teruo Ishii : les années noires" (in French). EigaGoGo!.
- Tavantzis, Nicolas (September 8, 2004). "Nicolas Tavantzis interviews Ishii". Sevin Michel (trans.). HK Mania.
- "TERUO ISHII". Complete Index to World Film.
- Teruo Ishii at IMDb
- Tominaga, Shinichi. (2000). "Geishas, Motorcycle Gangs and Supergiants: The World of Teruo Ishii—A spirited discussion between Teruo Ishii and cult director Takao Nakano." (Interview conducted in Tokyo, February 2000) in Asian Cult Cinema, #28, July 2000, p. 48–62.
- Weisser, Thomas; Yuko Mihara Weisser (1998). Japanese Cinema Encyclopedia: The Sex Films. Miami: Vital Books : Asian Cult Cinema Publications. pp. 198–199. ISBN 1-889288-52-7.

Monell Robert (2017) Bohachi Boshido https://www.tapatalk.com/groups/cinemadrome/viewtopic.php?p=1403#p1403
