= Horrors of Malformed Men =

- Theatrical release poster
- Directed by: Teruo Ishii
- Written by: Teruo Ishii; Masahiro Kakefuda
- Based on: Panorama Island Otan by Edogawa Rampo
- Produced by: Kanji Amao; Shigeru Okada
- Starring: Teruo Yoshida; Teruko Yumi
- Cinematography: Shigeru Akatsuka
- Edited by: Tadao Kanda
- Music by: Hajime Kaburagi
- Production company: Toei Company
- Distributed by: Toei
- Release date: October 31, 1969
- Running time: 99 minutes
- Country: Japan
- Language: Japanese

Horrors of Malformed Men (江戸川乱歩全集 恐怖奇形人間, Edogawa Rampo Zenshū: Kyoufu Kikei Ningen) is a 1969 Japanese horror film directed by Teruo Ishii, who also co-wrote the film. It is based on the novels Strange Tale of Panorama Island (パノラマ島奇談, Panorama-tō Kidan) and The Demon of the Lonely Isle (孤島の鬼, Kotō no Oni) by Edogawa Rampo.

== Plot ==
Hitomi Hirosuke (Teruo Yoshida), a medical student with almost no recollection of his past, is trapped in an asylum, despite being perfectly sane. After escaping, and being framed for the murder of a circus girl, he spots the photo of a recently deceased man, Genzaburo Komoda, to whom he bears an uncanny resemblance. By pretending to have been resurrected, Hirosuke assumes the dead man's identity, fooling everyone, including Komoda's widow and mistress. Whilst at the Komoda household, Hirosuke recalls memories that convince him to travel to a nearby island, home of Jogoro, the web-fingered father of Genzaburo. Whilst on the island, Hirosuke not only discovers Jogoro's plans to build his 'ideal community' (by transforming perfectly normal humans into malformed people) but also the awful truth behind his own identity.

== Cast ==
- Teruo Yoshida as Hirosuke Hitomi/Genzaburô Komoda
- Tatsumi Hijikata as Jogoro
- Yukie Kagawa as Shizuko
- Teruko Yumi as Hideko/Hatsuyo
- Mitsuko Aoi as Toki Komoda
- Asao Koike
- Michiko Kobata as Chiyoko Komoda
- Minoru Ōki as Kogorô Akechi/Manservant

== Release ==
=== Home media ===
On August 28, 2007, Synapse Films and Panik House gave Horrors of Malformed Men a mass-market release on region-1 DVD.

== Reception ==
=== Later reception ===
On Rotten Tomatoes, the film holds an approval rating of 100% based on 5 reviews, with a weighted average rating of 7.7/10.

Donald Guarisco from Allmovie praised the film, calling it "a powerful, transgressive work that still packs a punch". Stuart Galbraith IV from DVD Talk wrote, "With its odd mix of absurdist theater, surreal images, taboo-breaking depravity, and commercially driven exploitation, it's all over the stylistic map and not for all tastes, but a fascinating film on many levels". Ian Jane from RockShockPop.com called it "A genuine holy grail of Japanese genre cinema", commending the film's choreography, cinematography, mood, and use of surreal imagery. Arty Flores from HorrorNews.net liked the film, commending its bizarre and surreal imagery, while also noting that the film felt dated.

== Controversy and legacy ==
The film is considered a precursor to Toei's ventures into the "Pinky violent" style in the early 1970s.
