= Landmark cases of the Supreme Court of Japan =

This is a list of landmark cases of the Supreme Court of Japan.

Case Number	Date of Judgment	Commonly Used Case Name	Significance
2003 No. 157	February 19, 2008	Mapplethorpe Case	The Court found that a collection of Mapplethorpe photographs that included images of male genitalia was not obscene. The Court's decision was believed to be the first time the top court overruled a lower court ruling on obscenity.
2005 No. 1977	November 1, 2007	Overseas Hibakusha Case	The Court found that the government's refusal to provide health-care benefits to hibakusha living abroad was illegal. It was the first time the Court declared a government order illegal and upheld a ruling mandating the payment of damages.
2007 No. 30	August 7, 2007	Bull-Dog Sauce Case	Discriminatory treatment of some shareholders designed to prevent hostile takeover of a company (in this case the use of a "poison pill") does not necessarily violate the principle of shareholder equality under Japanese statutes. Such decisions must be made by shareholders who deem it in the company's best interest; it cannot be a move made by management to protect itself.

== See also ==
- Politics of Japan
- Japanese law
- Judicial System of Japan
- 2008 Decisions of the Supreme Court of Japan
