= 2008 decisions of the Supreme Court of Japan =

Following is an incomplete list of the 2008 Decisions of the Supreme Court of Japan.

The Supreme Court of Japan (最高裁判所 Saikō-Saibansho; called 最高裁 Saikō-Sai for short), located in Chiyoda, Tokyo is the highest court in Japan. It has ultimate judicial authority to interpret the Japanese constitution and decide questions of national law (including local bylaws). It has the power of judicial review; that is, it can declare Acts of Diet and Local Assembly, and administrative actions, to be unconstitutional.

The court decided a total of 51 cases in 2008.

== Decisions ==
Case Number	Date of Judgment	Commonly Used Case Name
2005 No. 304	January 18, 2008	(Public Funds Expenditure Restitution Claims Case)
2006 No. 2268	January 18, 2008	(Unjust Enrichment Restitution Claims Case)
2007 No. 1223	January 22, 2008	(Breaking and Entering and Indecent Assault Case)
2006 No. 1572	January 24, 2008	(Distributive Share Reduction and Vacate Building Claims Case)
2005 No. 1440	January 28, 2008	(Damages Restitution Claims Case)
2005 No. 1372	February 1, 2008	(Damages Restitution Claims Case)
2006 No. 1074	February 1, 2008	(Damages Restitution Claims Case)
2006 No. 2084	February 15, 2008	(Damages Restitution Claims Case)
2006 No. 1994	February 19, 2008	(Insurance Benefits Claims Case)
2003 No. 157	February 19, 2008	Mapplethorpe Case
2007 No. 528	February 22, 2008	(Registry of Title Transfer and Title Deletion Claim Suit，and Loan Claim Countersuit Case)
2007 No. 1443	February 26, 2008	(Dismissal of Corporate Director Claims Case)
2007 No. 611	February 28, 2008	(Damages Restitution Claims Case)
2005 No. 47	February 28, 2008	(Welfare Benefits Claims Dismissal / Cancellation Claims Case)
2007 No. 733	February 28, 2008	(Insurance Benefits Claims Case)
2006 No. 192	February 29, 2008	(Insurance Benefits Claims Case)
2005 No. 947	March 3, 2008	HIV-Tainted Blood Case
2006 No. 1249	March 4, 2008	(Sentencing for Acts Related to Child Prostitution and Pornography, and Violations of Laws Related to Protection of Children and Tariff Laws Case)
2007 No. 1659	March 4, 2008	(Violation of Stimulants Control Law and Tariff Law Case)
2007 No. 6	March 6, 2008	(Fine for Violation of Antitrust Measures Appeal Case)
2007 No. 403	March 6, 2008	Juki Net Case
2007 No. 24	March 13, 2008	(Cancellation on Appeal of Approval of a Civil Rehabilitation Plan Appeal Case)
2007 No. 1	March 14, 2008	Yokohama Incident Case
2006 No. 168	March 17, 2008	(Damages Restitution Substitution Claims Case)
2006 No. 2056	March 18, 2008	(Parent-Child Relationship Recognition Claims Case)
2004 No. 258	March 24, 2008	SCOJ 2004 No. 258 (Iwao Hakamada Special Appeal)
2006 No. 1870	March 27, 2008	(Damages Restitution Claims Case)
2006 No. 348	March 27, 2008	(Bribery Case)

== See also ==
- Politics of Japan
- Japanese law
- Judicial System of Japan
- Landmark Cases of the Supreme Court of Japan
