= SCOJ 2007 No. 30 =

SCOJ 2007 No. 30 (平成19(許)30)
- Court: Supreme Court of Japan (Second Petty Bench)
- Full case name: Bull-dog Sauce Case (株主総会決議禁止等仮処分命令申立て却下決定に対する抗告棄却決定に対する許可抗告事件)
- Decided: August 7, 2007
- Reported at: 第61巻5号2215頁

Holding
- Discriminatory treatment of some shareholders designed to prevent hostile takeover of a company (in this case the use of a "poison pill") does not necessarily violate the principle of shareholder equality under Japanese statutes. Such decisions must be made by shareholders who deem it in the company's best interest; it cannot be a move made by management to protect itself.

Court membership
- Chief Justice: Isao Imai (今井功)
- Associate Justice: Osamu Tsuno (津野修), Ryoji Nakagawa (中川了滋), Yuki Furuta (古田佑紀)

Case opinions
- Majority: Unanimous

Laws applied
- Company Law Article 109-1; Company Law Article 247-1, 247-2.

The Bull-dog Sauce Case is a Supreme Court of Japan case that resulted in a landmark decision regarding hostile takeover defense plans (such as the shareholder rights plan or "poison pill"). The Court held that such plans do not necessarily violate the principle of shareholder equality under Japanese statutes, even if they result in discriminatory treatment some shareholders; however, such decisions must be made by shareholders themselves, acting in the company's best interest; they cannot be made by management to protect itself. The Bull-dog Sauce case arose from the first use of a poison pill by a Japanese company, and resulted in the Supreme Court's first ruling on the subject of takeover defenses.

== Factual background ==
The Bull-Dog Sauce Co., Ltd. is a Japanese company engaged primarily in the manufacture and sale of food seasonings and sauces; it also owns and leases apartments and buildings.

Steel Partners LLC is an American hedge fund with offices in New York and Tokyo. It has invested in several Japanese companies that manufacture food and beverage products, including Bull-Dog Sauce, House Foods, Sapporo, and Nissin Foods; the fund frequently becomes the largest shareholder of a target company and then attempts a takeover or is vocally critical of the company's management. As of August 2007, Steel Partners held stakes in about 30 Japanese companies.

On March 30, 2007, Sapporo Holdings Ltd. shareholders voted two-thirds in favor of poison pill takeover defense measures in response to a takeover threat from Steel Partners.

== Legal background ==
=== Nippon Broadcasting case ===
The Tokyo District Court and Tokyo High Court rulings both cited the Tokyo High Court's 2005 Nippon Broadcasting Case ruling. In that case, the High Court ruled that a board of directors was generally not allowed to issue discriminatory stock warrants to prevent a shareholder from effecting a hostile takeover. However, The High Court noted an important exception: a board of directors was allowed to discriminate against a shareholder if that shareholder possessed an "abusive motive" (濫用目的). (This language was echoed in the High Court's ruling in the Bull-Dog Sauce Case, in which the High Court found Steel Partners to be an "abusive acquirer" (濫用的買収者); see below.) The High Court laid out four examples of clearly abusive motives: (1) greenmail; (2) "scorched earth" tactics (e.g. pillaging intellectual property); (3) aiming to use the target company's assets to pay off the bidding company's debts; (4) aiming to sell off assets to produce a large one-time dividend.

=== Unocal ===
Unocal v. Mesa Petroleum, 493 A.2d 946 (Del. 1985) was a 1985 Delaware Supreme Court case that established standards for determining the acceptability of takeover defense tactics such as the poison pill. At the core of the Unocal decision is the so-called proportionality test: a takeover defense is legitimate if the takeover bid presents a threat to the company, and the defense is proportionate to the threat. The Tokyo High Court's ruling in the Nippon Broadcasting Case (see above) has been called a "Unocal rule with Japanese characteristics." Indeed, in the Nippon Broadcasting Case, both sides referenced Unocal in their briefs to the trial court. The influence of Unocal was similarly seen in all three courts' rulings in the Bull-Dog Sauce Case

== Timeline of case ==
- May 2007: Steel Partners was the largest shareholder of Bull-Dog Sauce with 10.25% of shares.
- May 18: Steel Partners initiated a tender offer at ¥1,584 per share with the intention of acquiring 100% of Bull-Dog Sauce stock. It was widely suggested that Steel Partners would attempt greenmail or hope for the appearance of a white knight, a strategy that had previously proven profitable.
- June 7: Bull-Dog Sauce announced that it opposed the tender offer on the grounds that it could possibly harm the common interests of shareholders. At the same time, Bull-Dog Sauce's management proposed changes in the corporate charter and the issuance of stock warrants (the poison pill) at the general shareholders' meeting on 24 June.
- June 13: Steel Partners responded by seeking an injunction from the Tokyo District Court prohibiting the directors of Bull-Dog Sauce from passing a resolution on stock warrants and blocking issuance of the stock warrants.
- June 15: Steel Partners changed the terms of its tender offer, raising the price to ¥1,700 and pushing the expiration date back from 28 June to 10 August.
- June 19: Steel Partners withdrew the portion of the injunction requesting prohibition of the stock warrant resolution.
- June 24: At the general shareholders' meeting, the Bull-Dog Sauce's proposals to change the corporate charter and issue stock warrants were both approved with 83.4% of the vote.
- June 28: The Tokyo District Court rejected Steel Partners' request for an injunction blocking Bull-Dog Sauce's takeover defense.
- July 9: The Tokyo High Court rejected Steel Partners' appeal, upholding the Tokyo District Court's denial of Steel Partners' injunction request.
- August 7: The Supreme Court rejected Steel Partners' appeal, upholding the decisions by the Tokyo District Court and the Tokyo High Court to deny Steel Partners' motions.

== Supreme Court decision ==
=== Findings ===
The following were among the Supreme Court's findings:

1. The principle of shareholder equality, as codified in Article 109-1 of the Company Law, requires that a company treat shareholders fairly based on the type and number of shares they hold. However, if there is a risk that the acquisition of management control by a particular shareholder would harm the company's interests or the common interests of shareholders, discriminatory treatment of said shareholder aimed at preventing such acquisition is not a violation of the principle of shareholder equality unless said treatment is unreasonable.
2. The question of whether the acquisition of management control by a particular shareholder harms the common interests of shareholders "should be decided by the shareholders themselves, to whom the company's interests ultimately inure, and that decision should be respected unless the general shareholders' meeting was procedurally unfair, the facts upon which the decision was predicated prove to be nonexistent or false, or are there is some other important fault that renders the decision unjustified."
3. Steel Partners had the opportunity to express its opinion at the general shareholders' meeting, and it was able to receive compensation that approximated the value of the stock warrants. As such, the stock warrants were not unreasonable or contrary to the principle of shareholder equality.
4. A takeover defense plan (such as a poison pill) need not be laid out by management prior to a takeover attempt in order to be fair.
5. Stock warrants that discriminate against certain shareholders with the aim of supporting the company's management or retaining control in shareholders who support said management is blatantly unfair. The present case does not meet that description, however.

=== Validation of Tokyo District Court ruling ===
The Supreme Court's ruling was viewed as a clear expression of preference for the District Court's ruling that the identity of the decisionmaker determines the legitimacy of a takeover defense: shareholders are generally legitimate, whereas managers are generally not. See points (2) and (5) in above section "Findings". The District Court in turn had relied on the earlier Nippon Broadcasting Case to support these rulings. See above section "Legal Background."

=== Rejection of Tokyo High Court ruling ===
The Supreme Court did not adopt the Tokyo High Court's ruling that a discriminatory stock warrant may be used because a hostile bidder is an "abusive acquirer." In reaching this ruling, the High Court had relied on the four examples of "abusive motives" given in the Nippon Broadcasting Case. See above section "Legal Background."

== Impact ==
The Supreme Court decision was widely seen as a validation of the legality of the poison pill takeover defense scheme under Japanese law.

Although the Supreme Court did not validate the Tokyo High Court's finding that Steel Partners was an "abusive acquirer," the High Court's derogatory label received significant attention in the press and the business community.

In November 2007, Bull-Dog Sauce estimated a consolidated net loss of 1.7 billion yen for the full year to March, largely as a result of the fight against Steel Partners. Bull-Dog's market capitalization shrank by 45%, from 32.2 billion yen in June 2007.

On March 28, 2008, Sapporo shareholders voted to renew the company's poison pill takeover defense plan.

On April 18, 2008, Steel Partners sold its remaining stake in Bull-Dog Sauce.

== See also ==
- Japanese law
- Judicial system of Japan
- Landmark cases of the Supreme Court of Japan
- Politics of Japan
