= SCOJ 2005 No. 947 =

Landmark Supreme Court of Japan case over HIV-contaminated blood products

SCOJ 2005 No. 947 (平成17(あ)947)
- Court: Supreme Court of Japan (Second Petty Bench)
- Full case name: HIV-Tainted Blood Case (業務上過失致死被告事件)
- Decided: March 3, 2008
- Reported at: Not Yet Published

Holding
- It was recognized that the Ministry of Health and Welfare's Pharmaceuticals Affair Bureau Section Chief of Biologics, who was responsible for prevention of harm by medicine, committed professional negligence that resulted in death. He neglected his essential duty to thoroughly administer pharmaceutical practice in a case where a patient developed AIDS and died after being given HIV-tainted blood products.

Court membership
- Chief Justice: Yuuki Furuta (古田佑紀)
- Associate Justice: Osamu Tsuno (津野修), Isao Imai (今井功), Mutsuo Tahara (田原睦夫), Nakagawa Ryouji (中川了滋)

The HIV-Tainted Blood Case (業務上過失致死被告事件) is a Supreme Court of Japan case that resulted in a landmark decision regarding criminal responsibility for administrative negligence. The Court upheld the conviction of Akihito Matsumura, former director of the biologics division of the old Health and Welfare Ministry, for his failure to prevent the use of HIV-contaminated blood products in the 1980s that resulted in the death of a patient. According to the two lower court rulings, Matsumura caused the death of a patient with liver disease in December 1995 by failing to stop the use of unheated blood products contaminated with HIV. The decision marks the first time that a government official has been held criminally responsible for administrative negligence. The decision finalized a verdict of 1 year in prison, suspended for two years, for Matsumura.

== History of case ==
Matsumura, a qualified doctor, headed the health ministry's biologics division from July 1984 to June 1986. He was responsible for authorizing the production and importing of new blood products.

More 1,400 haemophiliacs were exposed to HIV as a result of his failure to prevent the distribution of blood in the 1980s when it was known there was a risk of contamination. More than 500 of those people have died. Matsumura, 60, was head of the Health Ministry division that handled blood products from 1984 to 1986. Heat treatment, which makes blood safe, was not approved in Japan until 1985, about two years after it was introduced in the US. Unheated blood was not banned until 1986.

Matsumura, hemophilia expert Takeshi Abe and three former presidents of blood product maker Green Cross Corp. were indicted over the scandal.

The Osaka High Court found Renzo Matsushita, a former president of the Osaka-based Green Cross company, and two of his colleagues—Tadakazu Suyama and Takehiko Kawano—guilty of professional negligence resulting in death.

It has been suggested that the scandal originated in an alleged effort by the Japanese government to hide war crimes committed by the members of Unit 731 of the Imperial Army during WWII. Ryōichi Naitō, an army doctor from Unit 731, founded the Japan Blood Bank, which became Green Cross Corp. in 1964. Unit 731's commander, Masaji Kitano, became a director of Green Cross, and other former members also served on the Green Cross's staff during the 1970s and 1980s. The firm ultimately became the leading pharmaceutical company and the largest producer of blood products in Japan. Several former members of Unit 731 also worked at the laboratory at the National Institute of Health, a subsidiary of the Ministry of Health and Welfare, that tested Green Cross's blood products. That laboratory reported that there were no signs of a dangerous virus in the Green Cross blood products.

== Supreme Court decision ==
The Supreme Court said that the primary responsibility for preventing drug-induced health problems rests with pharmaceutical companies and doctors. Since government regulatory power is secondary, even if it neglected to exercise its power, individual government employees cannot be immediately held criminally responsible for such problems. However, the logic does not apply to cases in which there is imminent danger, such as when someone has become infected with AIDS due to the use of tainted blood products.

== Impact ==
The editorial page of the Asahi Shimbun argued that despite the Supreme Court decision, the government of Japan has not acknowledged responsibility for preventing harm to citizens from medical products:

Although it does not demand criminal responsibility, the case reminds us of the problem of drug-induced hepatitis that came to light last year. Even though the Ministry of Health, Labor and Welfare had a list of 418 patients who might have contracted hepatitis C through tainted blood products, it sat back and did nothing. That time, too, the ministry refused to recognize the responsibility of the administration, claiming, "It is the responsibility of doctors to inform patients and the government is under no such obligation." The ministry's irresponsible attitude has not changed one iota.

== See also ==
- Politics of Japan
- Japanese law
- Judicial System of Japan
- 2008 Decisions of the Supreme Court of Japan
