= Liberalism in Japan =

Japanese liberalism (自由主義 or リベラリズム) (Note: In Japan, American and European style "liberal" / "liberalism" is often referred to as "リベラル" / "リベラリズム" in katakana. Although the term "自由主義" in kanji is also synonymous with "リベラリズム", "自由主義" is also used by conservatives, including LDP, in a similar sense to anti-communism or economic liberalism.) formed in the nineteenth century as a reaction against traditional society. In the twentieth century 'liberal' (自由) gradually became a synonym for conservative, and today the main conservative party in the country is named Liberal Democratic Party (自由民主党, Jiyū-Minshutō). The defunct Democratic Party (民主党, Minshutō) was considered in part a centrist-liberal party, as are most parties which derived from it. The liberal character of the Liberal League (自由連合, Jiyū Rengō) is disputed, as it is also considered to be conservative by some. This article is limited to liberal (リベラル) parties with substantial support, proved by having had representation in parliament.

== Modern Japanese liberalism ==
Liberals in Japan are generally considered united by one major factor: their opposition to changing the post-World War II constitution forbidding the creation of a national military.

Before the 1990s, Japanese liberals did not form a prominent individual political party.

- Japan's radical liberalism (left-wing liberalism) emerged as a "peace movement" and was largely led by the Japan Socialist Party (JSP).
- Until the 1990s, conservative liberalism (right-wing liberalism) in Japan was led by the Liberal Democratic Party (LDP), and they contrasted with left-wing liberalism.

Since the 1990s, most conservative liberals have left the LDP. The Japan New Party (JNP) and New Party Sakigake are the parties founded by Japanese conservative-liberals against the LDP's nationalist project, which lead to the Democratic Party of Japan (DPJ)-liberalism tradition. Japan's previous liberal party, the DPJ, was led by moderates of both the right-wing LDP and left-wing JSP.

Currently, the LDP has not been considered a liberal party. In the past, liberals in the LDP became opposition forces after leaving the party, so "liberal" generally became a force against "conservative" in Japanese politics in the 21st century. The current DPJ-liberalism tradition is being continued by the Constitutional Democratic Party of Japan (CDPJ).

Since Japanese conservatism was influenced by Shinto, Japan's radical liberalism and democratic socialism were more influenced by Christianity.

As the LDP becomes an increasingly solid conservative party, and the socialist movement that led the traditional anti-LDP camp has lost control in Japan's opposition political camp, gradually shifting from the centre-right "liberal" in the European and Australian sense of the past to the centre-left "liberal" in the American sense. Currently, the LDP is the largest conservative party in Japan, and the CDPJ is the largest liberal party in Japan.

== Timeline ==
The sign ⇒ means a reference to another party in that scheme. For inclusion in this scheme it isn't necessary that parties labelled themselves "liberal".

=== From Public Party of Patriots until Constitutional Party ===
- 1874: Liberals founded the Aikoku Kōtō (愛国公党, Public Party of Patriots)
- 1881: The Aikoku Kōtō is continued by the Jiyūtō (自由党, Liberal Party)
- 1891: The Jiyūtō is renamed into Rikken Jiyūtō (立憲自由党, Constitutional Liberal Party)
- 1898: The Rikken Jiyūtō merged with the ⇒ Shimpotō into the Kenseitō (憲政党, Constitutional Party)
- 1898: A faction seceded as the ⇒ Kensei Hontō; with the former Jiyūtō faction reorganizing itself into the New Kenseitō
- 1900: The party is taken over by the oligarchy and renamed into Rikken Seiyūkai (立憲政友会, Association of Friends of Constitutional Government)

=== From Constitutional Reform Party to Reform Club ===
- 1882: The Rikken Kaishintō (立憲改進党, Constitutional Reform Party) is formed
- 1896: The party is continued by the Shimpotō (進歩党, Progressive Party)
- 1898: The party merged into the ⇒ Kenseitō
- 1898: The Kenseitō fell apart and a faction formed the Kensei Hontō (憲政本党, Orthodox Constitutional Party), renamed in 1910 into the Rikken Kokumintō (立憲国民党, Constitutional National Party)
- 1913: A faction seceded as the ⇒ Rikken Dōshikai
- 1922: The Rikken Kokumintō is renamed Kakushin Club (革新倶楽部, Reform Club)
- 1920s: The Kakushin Club merged into the Rikken Seiyūkai

=== From Association of Friends of the Constitution to Constitutional Democratic Party ===
- 1913: A faction of the ⇒ Rikken Kokumintō formed the Rikken Dōshikai (立憲同志会, Association of Friends of the Constitution), renamed Kenseikai (憲政会, Constitutional Politics Association) in 1916
- 1927: The Kenseikai merged with the ⇒ Seiyūhontō into the Rikken Minseitō (立憲民政党, Constitutional Democratic Party)
- 1940: The party is dissolved by the military junta

=== Orthodox Constitutional Friends Party ===
- 1924: A faction of the Rikken Seiyūkai formed the Seiyūhontō (政友本党, Orthodox Constitutional Friends Party)
- 1927: The party merged into the ⇒ Rikken Minseitō

=== Postwar period ===
In postwar Japan, liberal (リベラル, riberaru) tendencies did not stand out much among major political parties for more than 40 years. During the Japanese Empire, liberals, including the Constitutional Democratic Party, were swept away by several political parties. The center-right liberal-conservatives (自由保守主義) became the 'leftist faction' of the right-wing conservative Liberal Democratic Party, and the center-left progressive-liberals (革新自由主義) formed the 'rightist faction' within the left-wing Socialist Party.

=== From Renewal Party to Liberal Party ===
- 1993: A liberal faction of the conservative Liberal Democratic Party (自由民主党, Jiyū-Minshutō) seceded as the Renewal Party (新生党, Shinseitō)
- 1994: The Renewal Party merged with other factions into the New Frontier Party (新進党, Shinshintō; "New Progressive Party")
- 1997: The New Frontier Party fell apart into many parties, among them since 1998 the Liberal Party (1998) (自由党, Jiyū-tō), but also the Good Governance Party (民政党, Minseitō), the New Fraternity Party (新党友愛, Shintō Yūai) and the Democratic Reform Association (民主改革連合, Minshu-Kaikaku-Rengō)
- 2000: Dissidents of the Liberal Party formed the New Conservative Party (保守党, Hoshutō)
- 2003: The Liberal Party merged into the ⇒ Democratic Party of Japan
- 2012: People's Life First (国民の生活が第一, Kokumin no Seikatsu ga Dai'ichi) split from the Democratic Party of Japan
- 2012: People's Life First split into a new Liberal Party and Tomorrow Party of Japan (日本未来の党, Nippon Mirai no Tō)
- 2013: Tomorrow Party of Japan dissolved
- 2019: Liberal Party merged into ⇒ Democratic Party for the People

=== New Harbinger Party ===
- 1993: A liberal faction of the conservative Liberal Democratic Party (自由民主党, Jiyū-Minshutō) seceded as the New Harbinger Party (新党さきがけ, Shintō Sakigake)
- 1996: Most members left to co-found the ⇒ Democratic Party of Japan
- 1998: The remainder of the party evolved in conservative direction and renamed itself as Harbinger (さきがけ, Sakigake), before becoming the ecologist Green Assembly (みどりの会議, Midori no Kaigi) in 2002

=== Democratic Party of Japan (1998–2016) ===
- 1996: Dissidents from the ⇒ New Harbinger Party and the Social Democratic Party founded the Democratic Party of Japan (1996) (民主党, Minshutō)
- 1998: The party merged with the Good Governance Party, the New Fraternity Party and the Democratic Reform Party to form a new, enlarged Democratic Party of Japan (1998) (民主党, Minshutō)
- 2003: The ⇒ Liberal Party (1998) merged into the party
- 2016: The Democratic Party of Japan merged with Japan Innovation Party and Vision of Reform to form the Democratic Party (民進党, Minshintō)

=== CDP and DPP (2017–present) ===
- 2017: The Constitutional Democratic Party of Japan (立憲民主党, Rikken-minshutō) is formed as a centre-left social liberal party split from the Democratic Party.
- 2018: The remaining Democratic Party merged with Kibō no Tō to form the Democratic Party for the People (国民民主党, Kokumin Minshutō), which includes liberals and conservatives.
- 2020: The majority faction of DPP merged into the new CDP, while the minority faction remain in the DPP.
- 2026: CDP merged with Centrist Reform Alliance (中道改革連合, Chūdō Kaikaku Rengō) which includes Komeito.
- 2026: CDP split from the CRA to found the Democratic Reform Party (民主改革の会, Minshu kaikaku no kai).

== Liberal figures ==
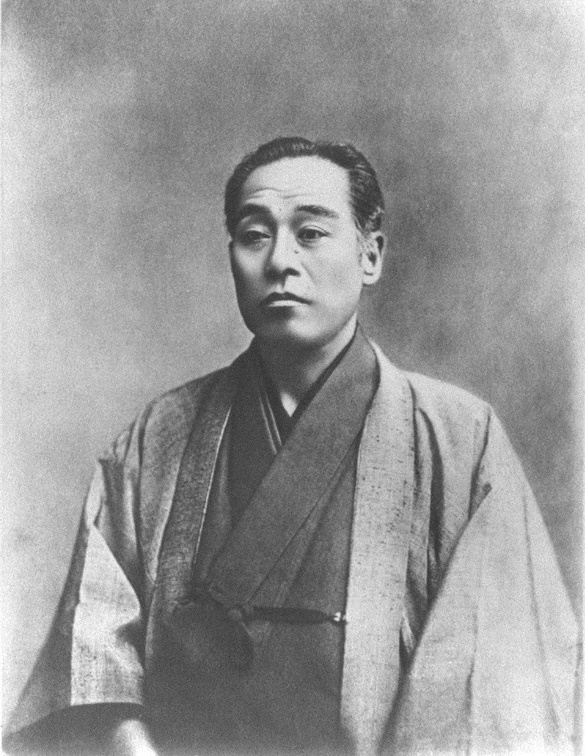
Fukuzawa Yukichi

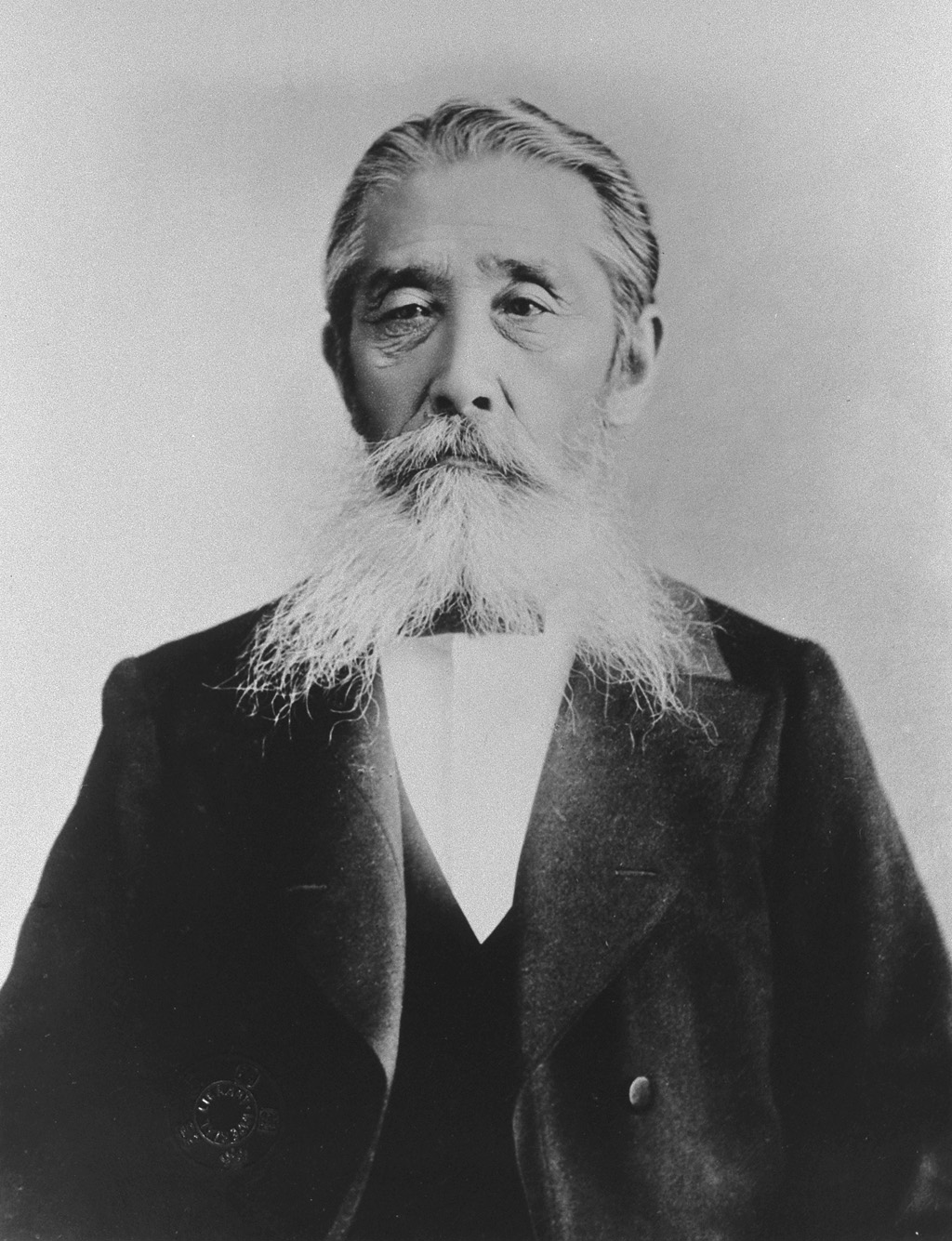
Itagaki Taisuke

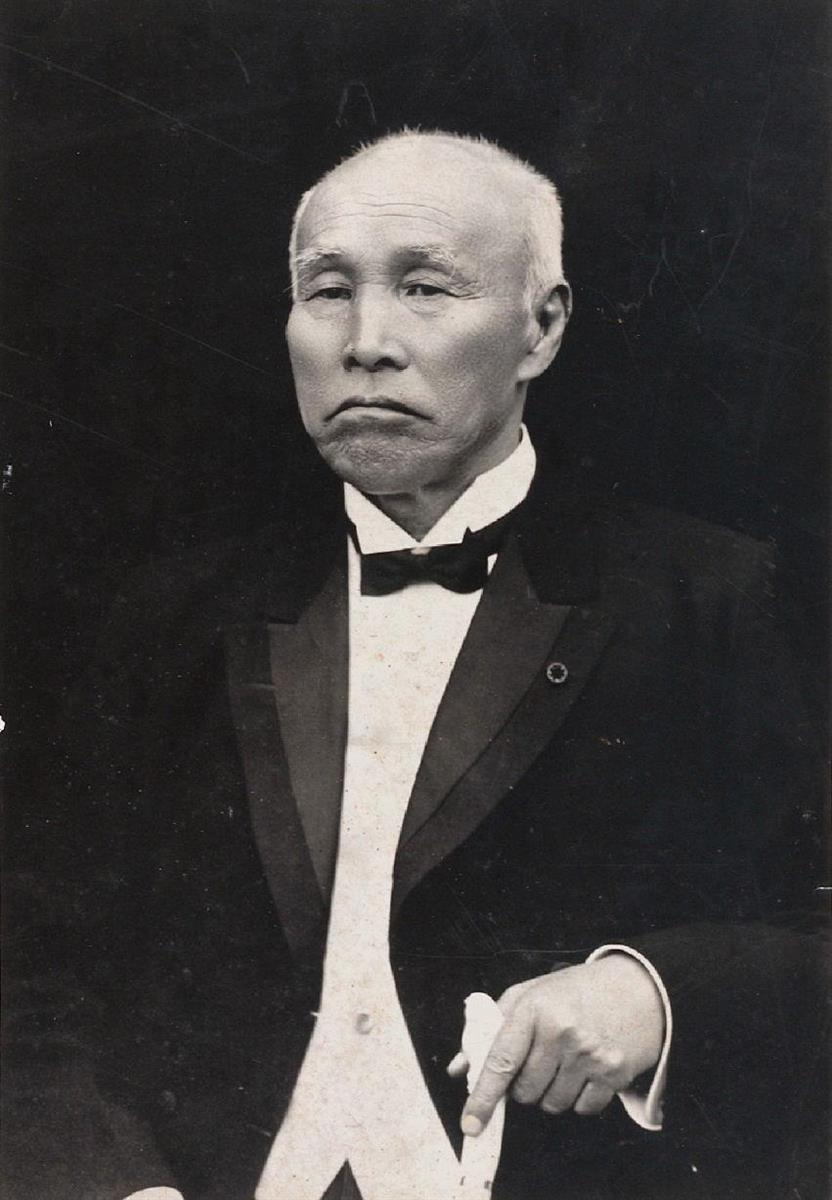
Prime minister Ōkuma Shigenobu

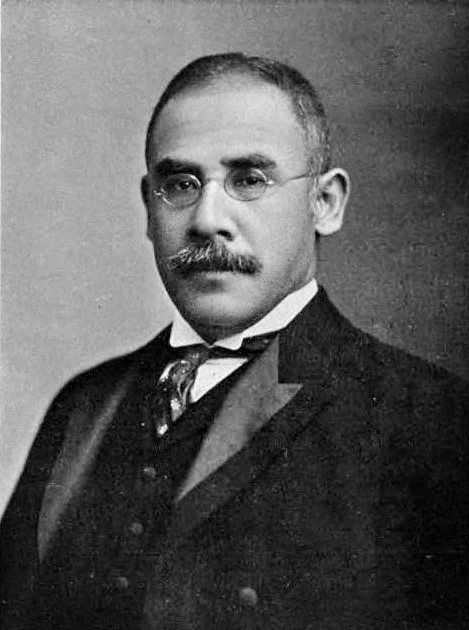
Prime minister Katō Takaaki

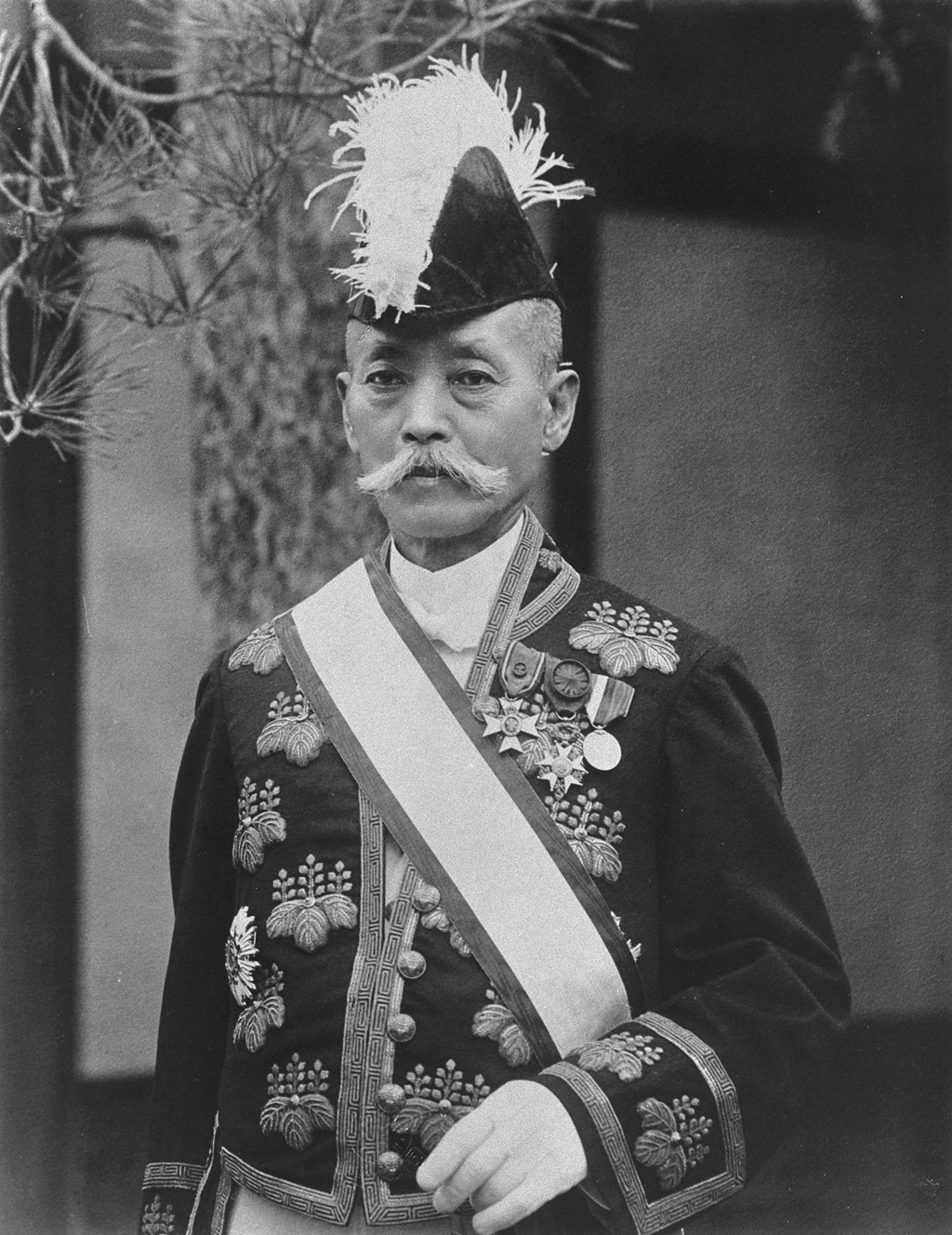
Yukio Ozaki

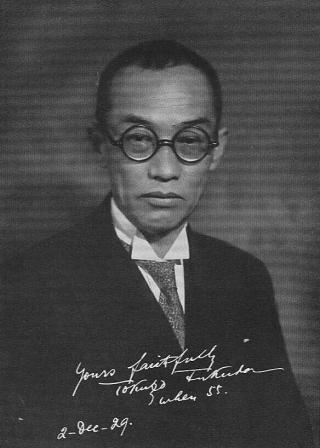
Tokuzō Fukuda

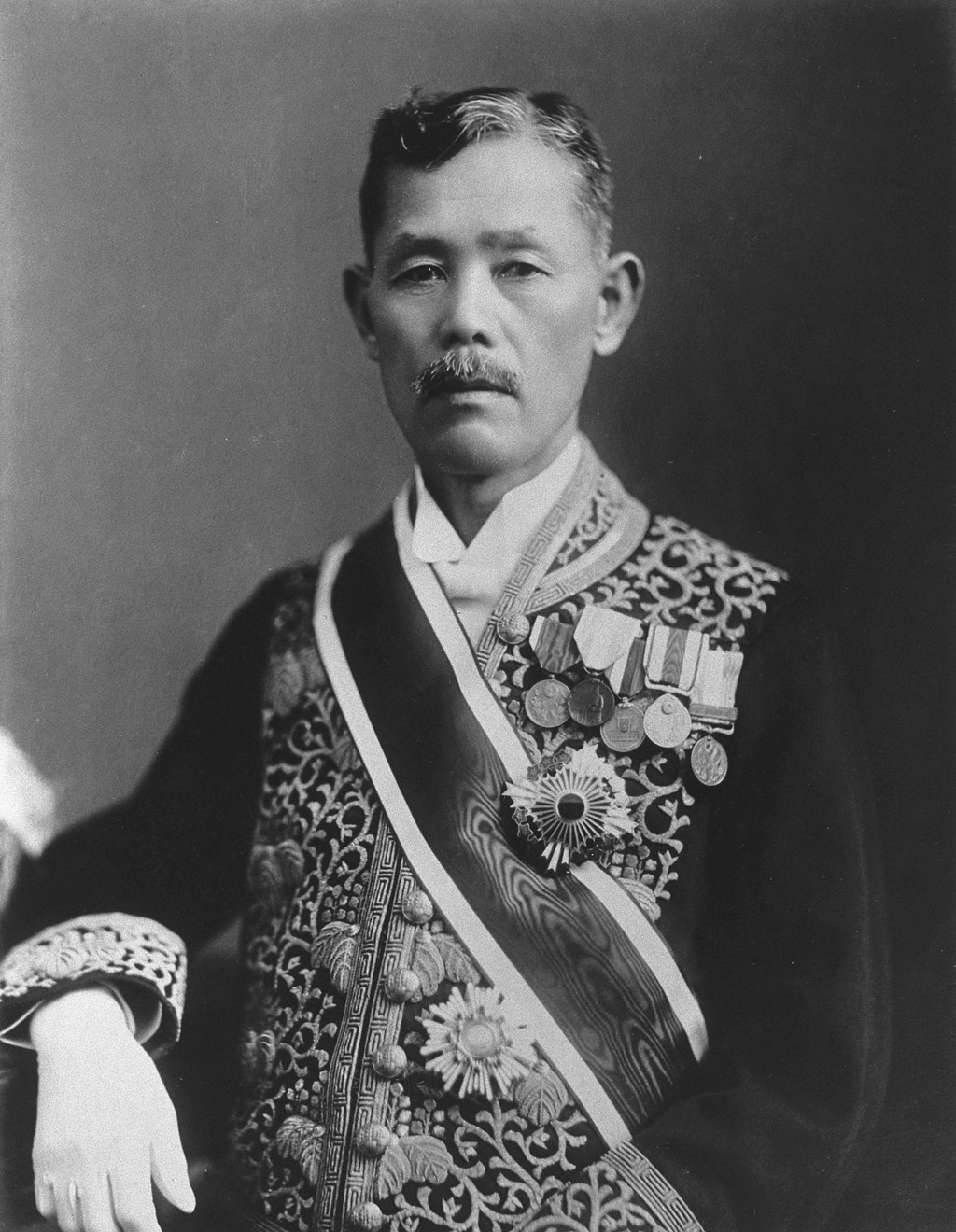
Prime minister Wakatsuki Reijirō

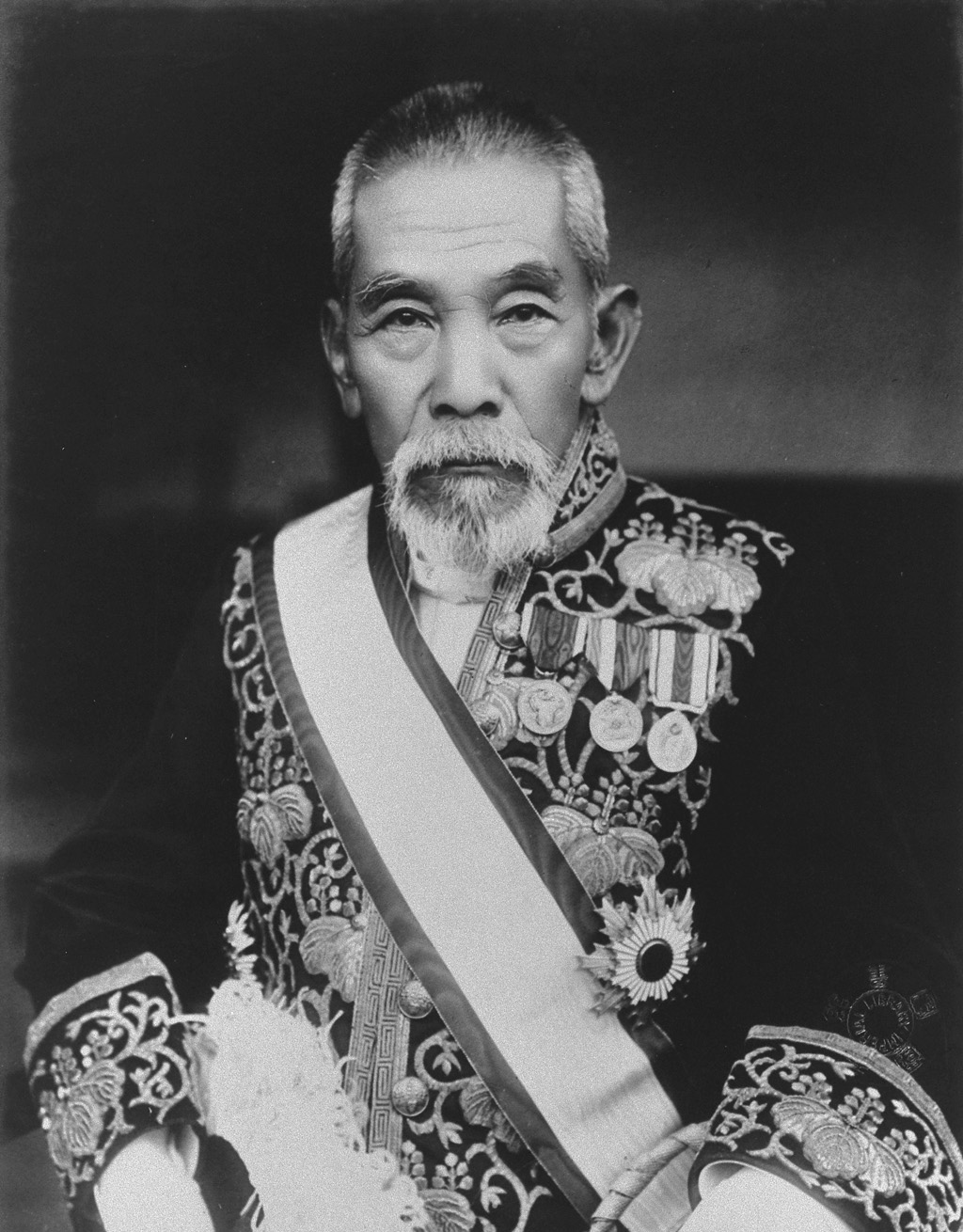
Prime minister Inukai Tsuyoshi

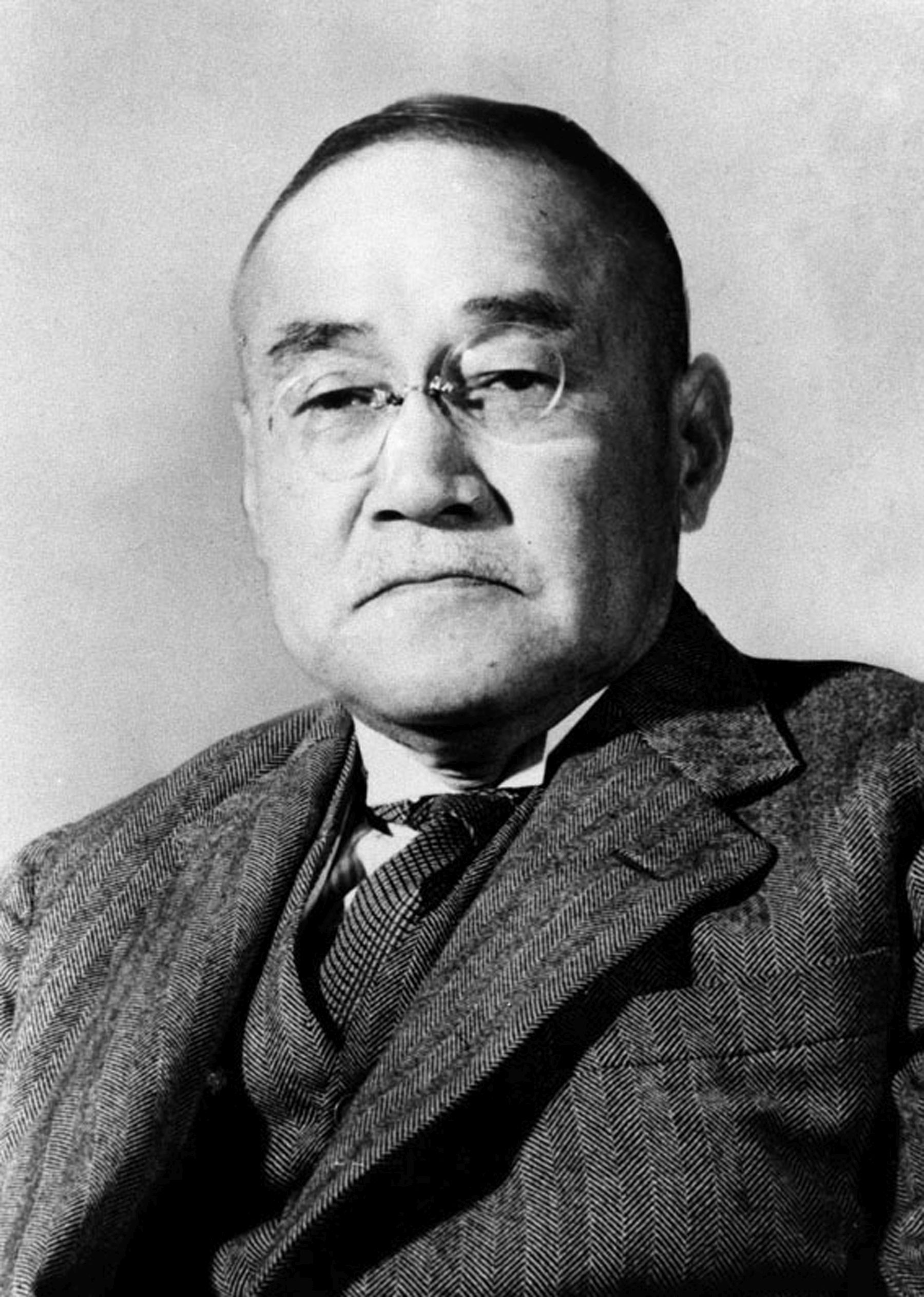
Prime minister Shigeru Yoshida

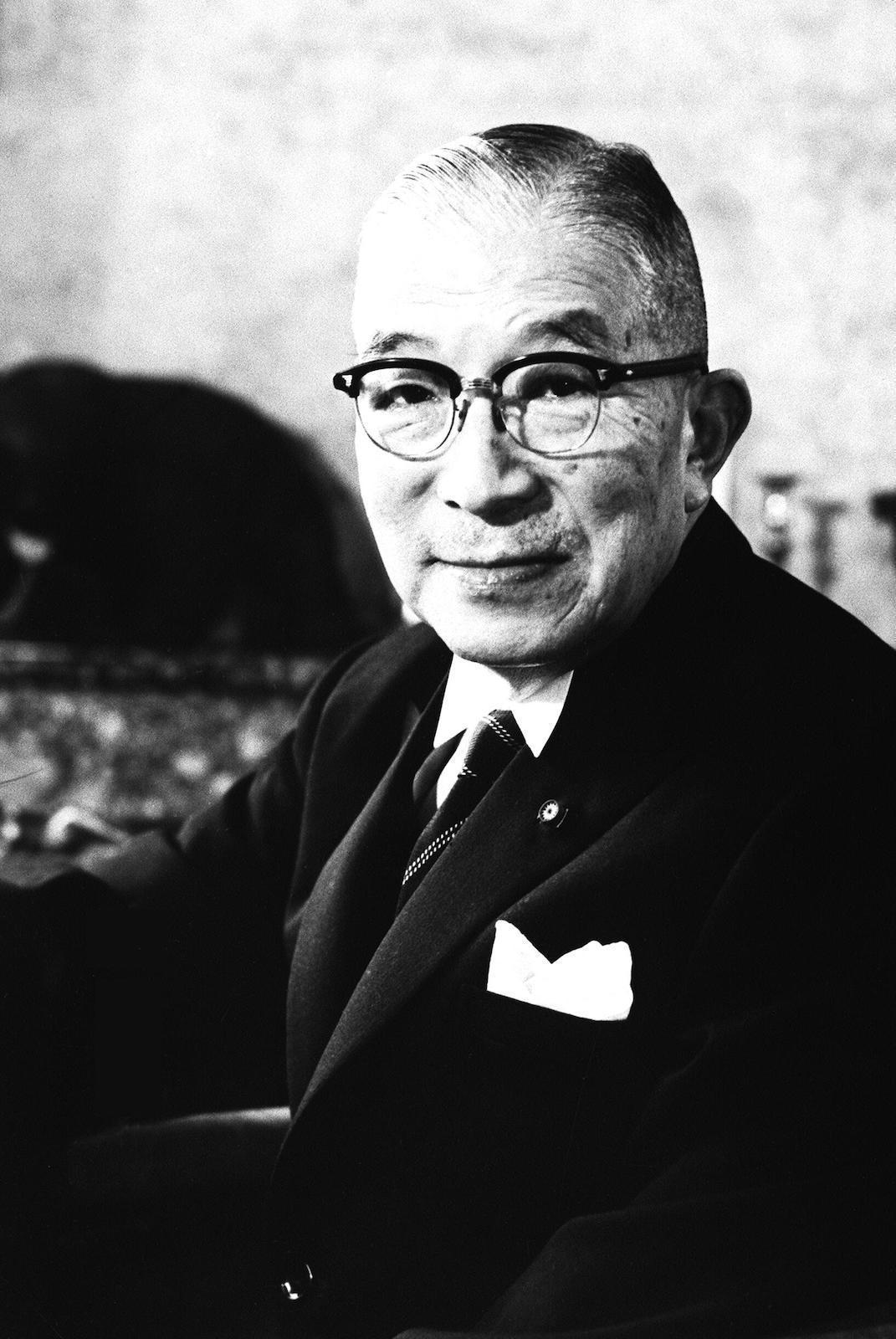
Prime minister Ichirō Hatoyama

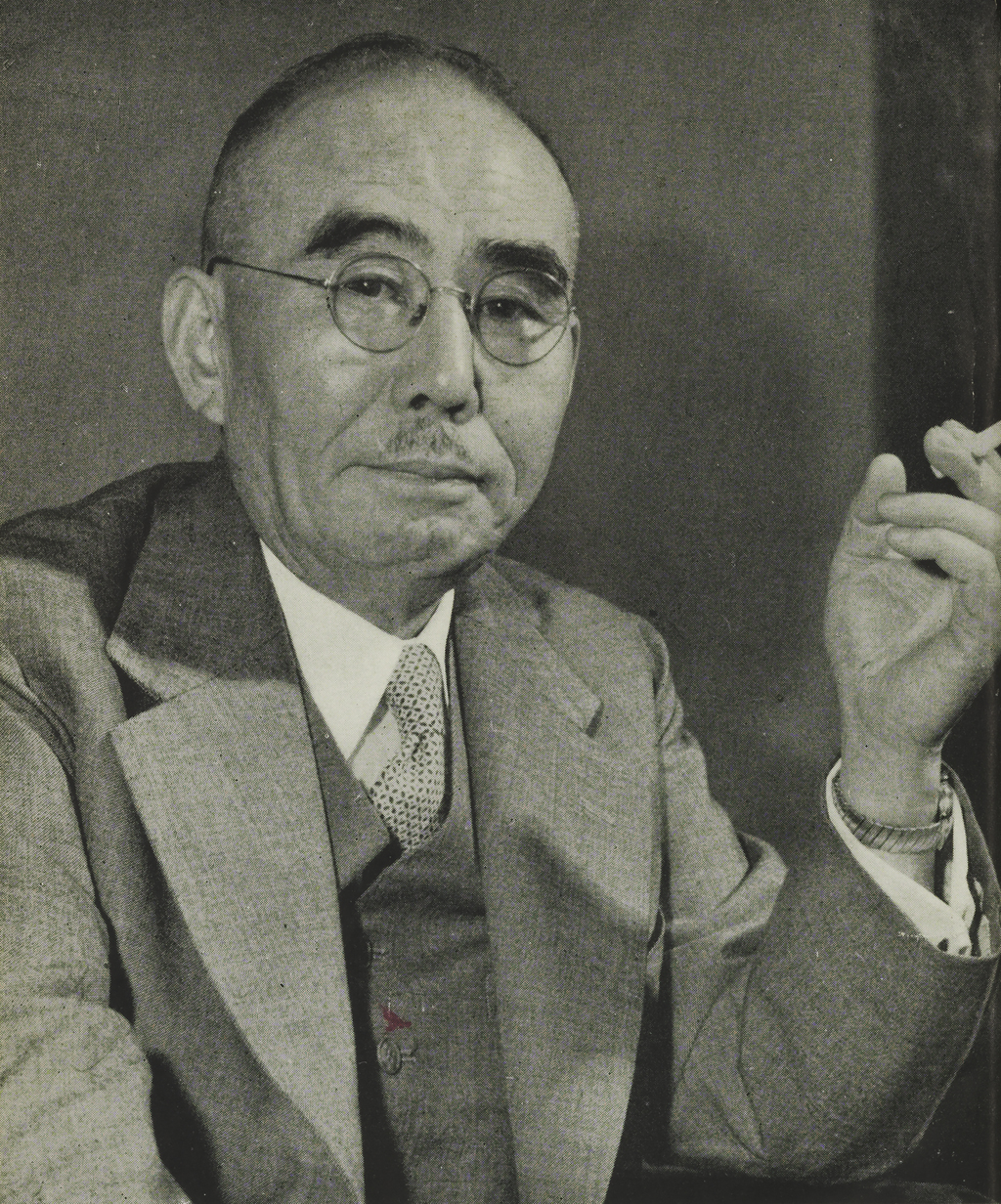
Prime minister Tanzan Ishibashi

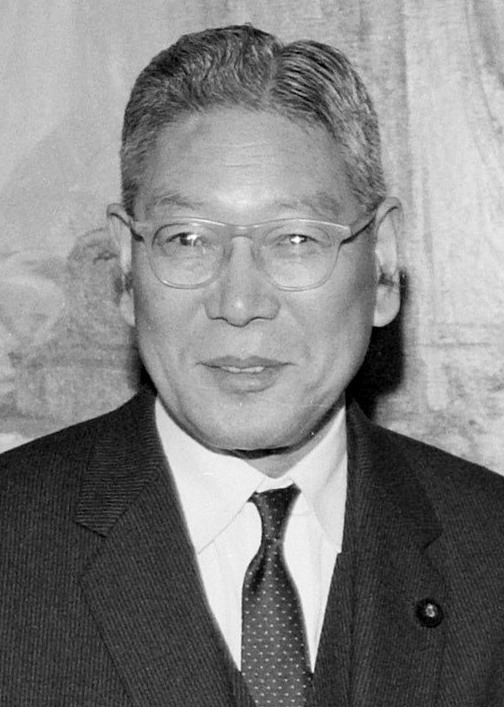
Prime minister Hayato Ikeda

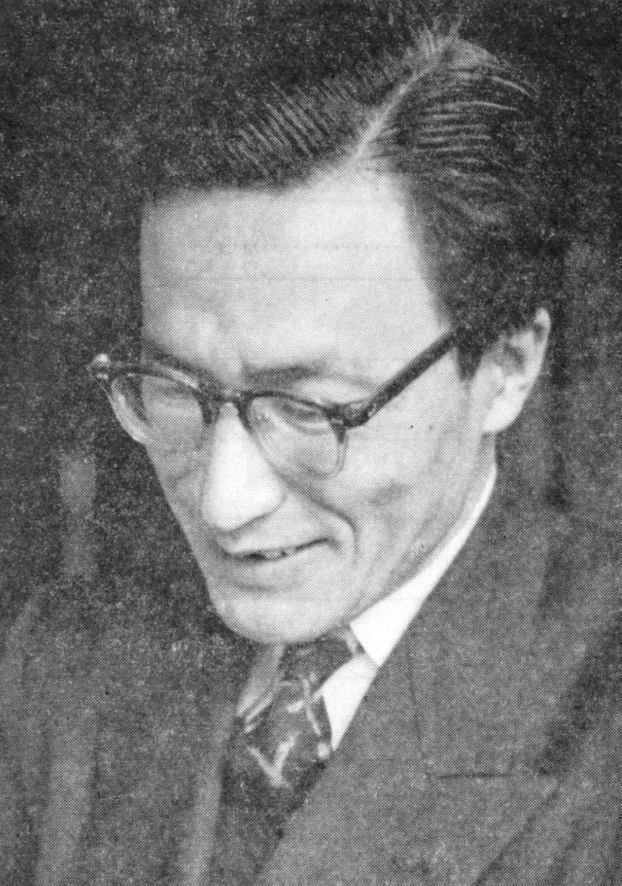
Masao Maruyama

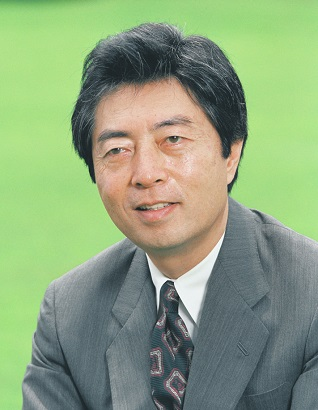
Prime minister Morihiro Hosokawa

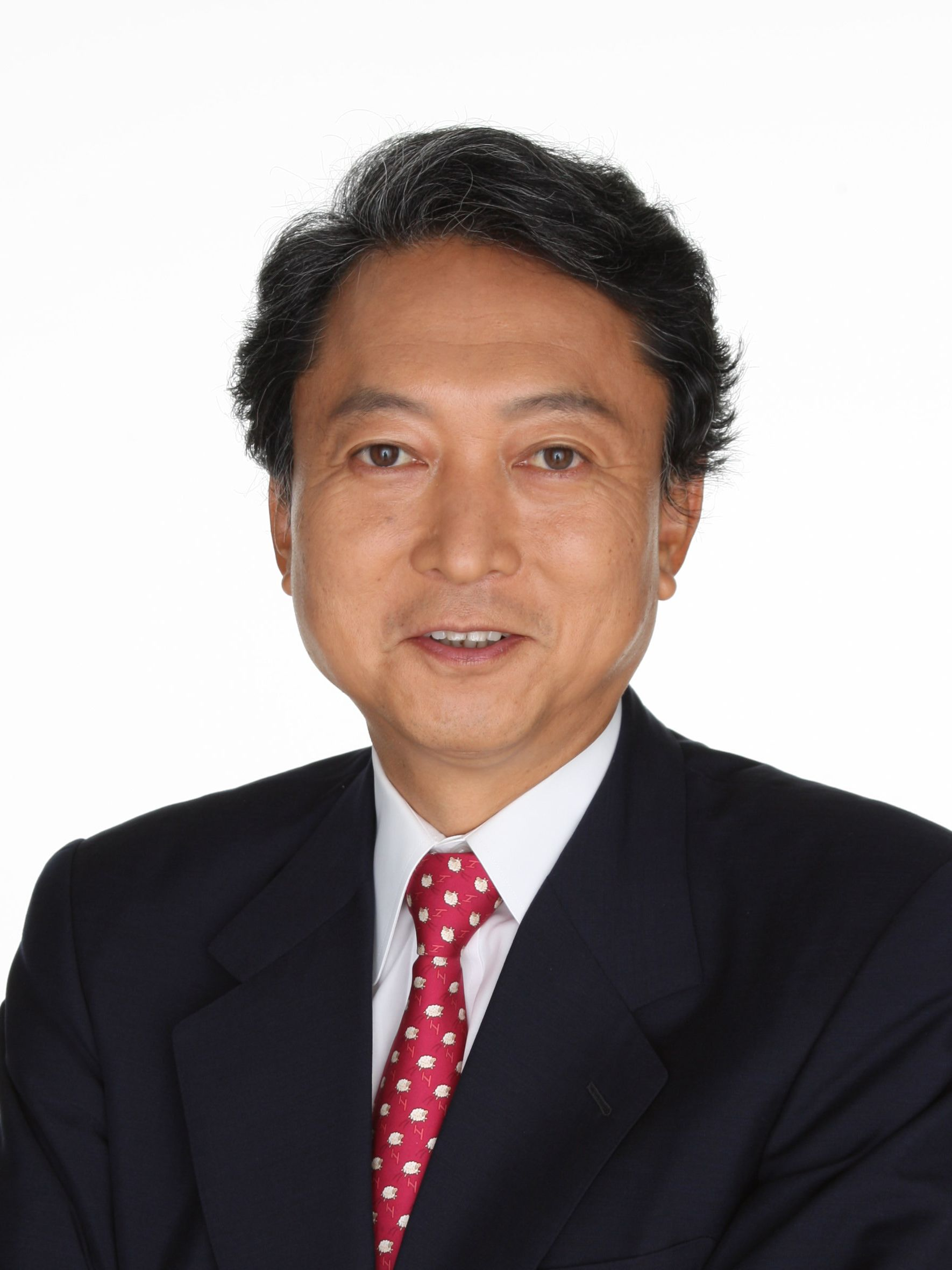
Prime minister Yukio Hatoyama

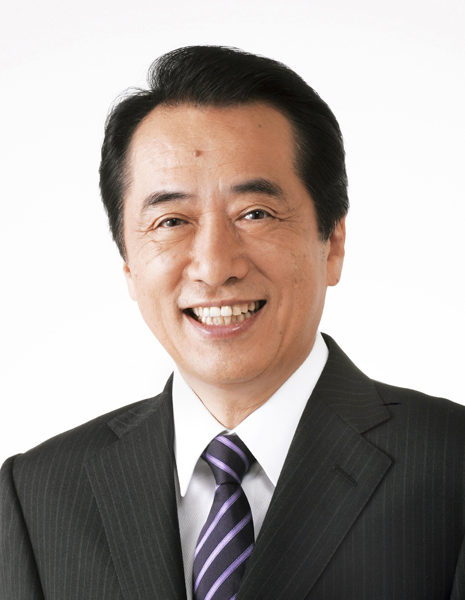
Prime minister Naoto Kan

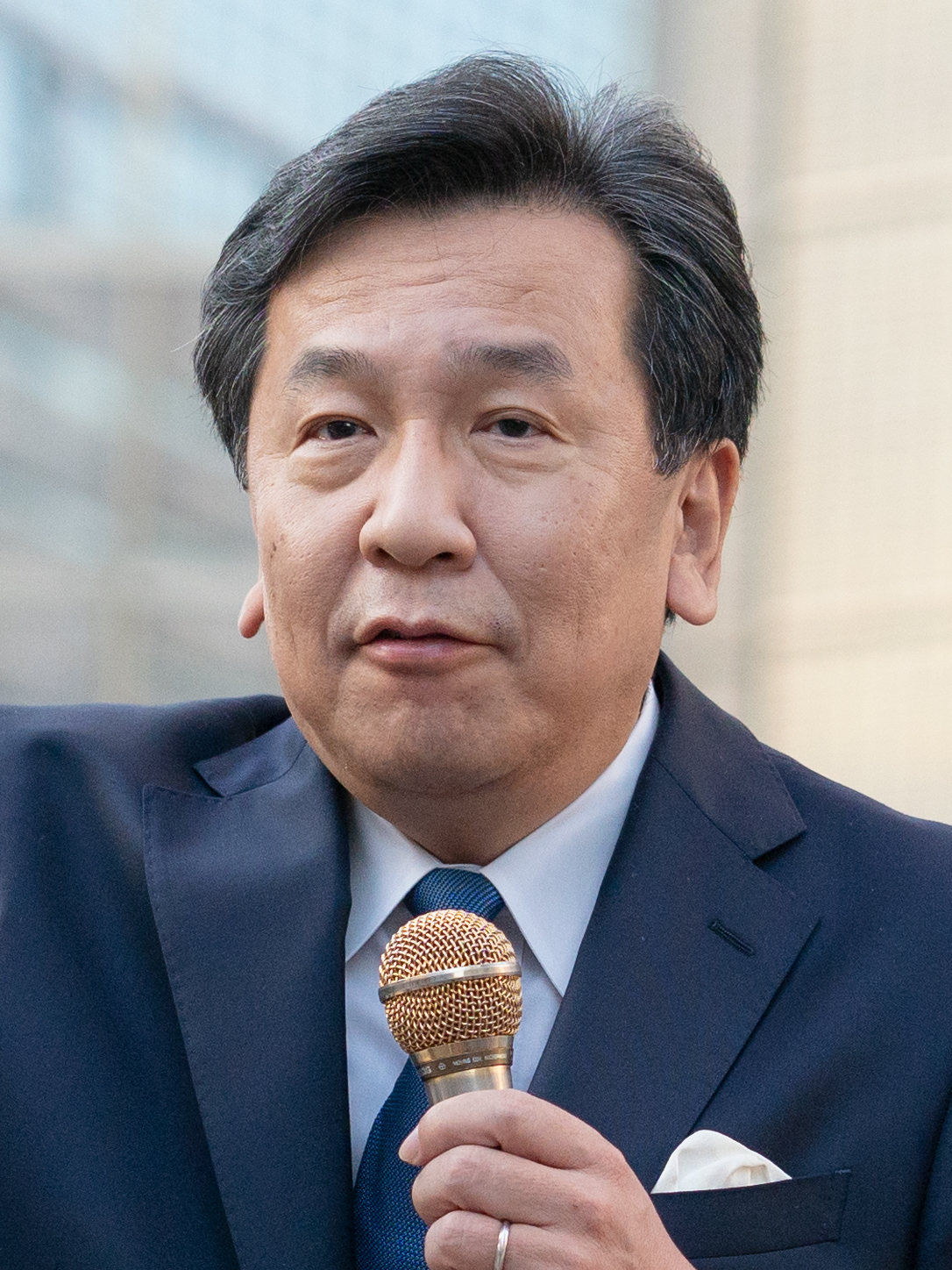
Leader Yukio Edano of the CDPJ

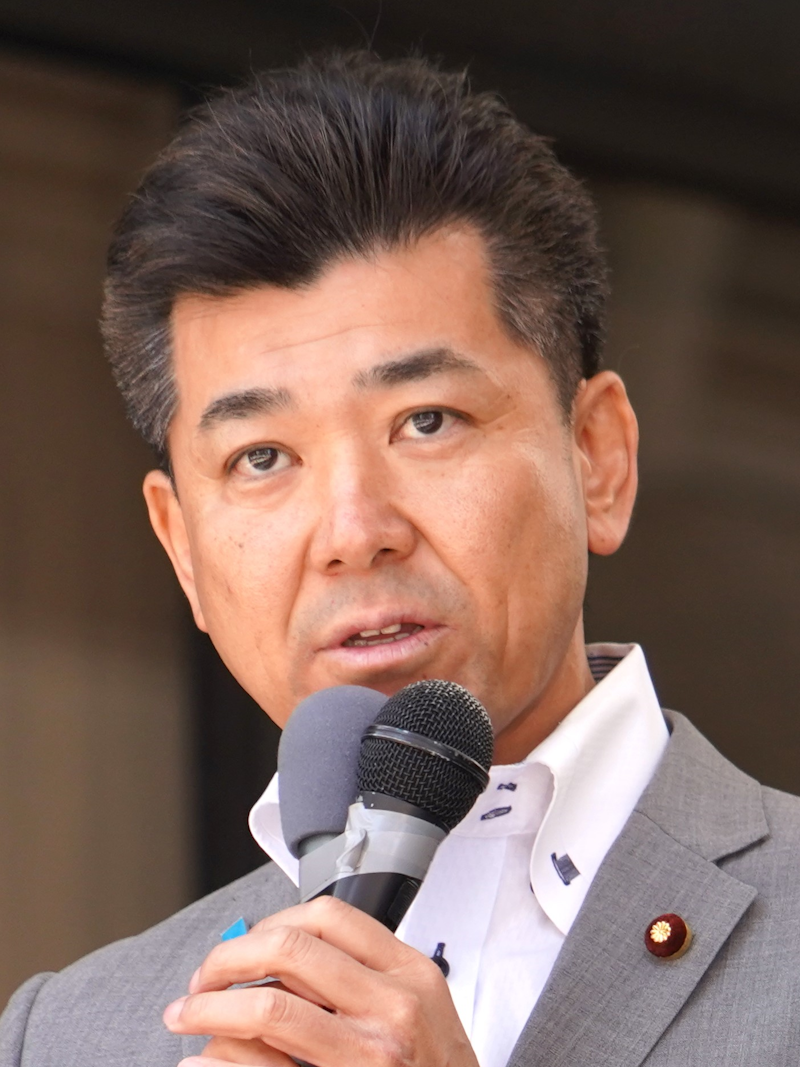
Leader Kenta Izumi of the CDPJ

== See also ==
- Conservatism in Japan
- History of Japan
- Politics of Japan
- List of political parties in Japan
- Mainichi Shimbun
- Reformist party (Japan)
- The Asahi Shimbun
- Chunichi Shimbun
- Non-LDP and non-JCP Coalition
- Kakushin Sētō (progressive political parties)
- Christianity in Japan
- Liberalism in South Korea – This was also influenced by Japanese liberalism during its early formation.
