= SCOJ 2003 No. 157 =

SCOJ 2003 No. 157 (平成15(行ツ)157)
- Court: Supreme Court of Japan (Third Petty Bench)
- Full case name: Importation of Contraband Case (輸入禁制品該当通知取消等請求事件)
- Decided: February 19, 2008
- Reported at: Not Yet Published

Holding
- 1) Article 21 Section 1 Clause 4 of the Customs Tariff Law (関税定率法（平成１７年法律第２２号による改正前のもの）２１条１項４号), regarding the importation of obscene materials, does not violate Article 21 Section 1 of the Constitution of Japan. 2) The Customs Tariff Law's ban on the importation of "books and images harmful to public morality" does not apply to a particular collection of photography including images of male genitalia.

Court membership
- Chief Justice: Kouhei Nasu (那須弘平)
- Associate Justice: Tokiyasu Fujita (藤田宙靖), Yukio Horigome (堀籠幸男), Mutsuo Tahara (田原睦夫), Takaharu Kondou (近藤崇晴)

Case opinions
- Majority: by Kohei Nasu

Laws applied
- （１，２につき）関税定率法（平成17年法律第22号による改正前のもの）21条1項4号，関税定率法（平成17年法律第22号による改正前のもの）21条3項，関税法69条の11第1項7号，関税法69条の11第3項 （１につき）憲法21条1項

The Importation of Contraband Case (輸入禁制品該当通知取消等請求事件), or SCOJ 2003 No.157, is a Supreme Court of Japan case that resulted in a landmark decision regarding obscenity standards in Japan. The Court held that 1) the ban on the importation of obscene material in the Customs Tariff Law did not violate the Constitution's guarantee of freedom of expression, and 2) the photo book Mapplethorpe did not qualify as obscene under the Customs Tariff Law's definition of obscenity. The case was brought on appeal from a 2003 decision by the Tokyo High Court.

== History of case ==
Mapplethorpe was originally published in Japan by Random House in 1994 without objection from the authorities. However, in 1999 a copy of the book was confiscated from Mr. Takahashi Asai by airport customs officials at Narita Airport.

== Supreme Court decision ==
Justice Kohei Nasu wrote that the 384-page volume of black-and-white portraits, including 20 close-ups of male genitalia, “compiles work from the artistic point of view, and is not obscene as a whole.”

== Impact ==
Asai called the Supreme Court decision “groundbreaking” and said it “could change the obscenity standard” used for banning foreign films that depict nudity and for censoring photographs in books. The Court's decision was believed to be the first time the top court overruled a lower court ruling on obscenity.

== See also ==
- Politics of Japan
- Japanese law
- Judicial System of Japan
- 2008 Decisions of the Supreme Court of Japan
