= Japanese public corporations =

Although the Japanese economy is largely based on private enterprise, it has a number of government-owned (public) corporations, which are more extensive and, in some cases, different in function from what exists in the United States.

== History ==
In 1988 there were ninety-seven public corporations, reduced from 111 in the early 1980s as a result of administrative reforms. Public companies at the national level were normally affiliated with one of the economic ministries, although the extent of direct management and supervision varied. The government divided the national-level corporations into several categories. The first included the main public service and monopoly corporations: Nippon Telegraph and Telephone Public Corporation, Japanese National Railways, and Japan Tobacco and Salt Public Corporation (now Japan Tobacco). However, Nippon Telegraph and Telephone Corporation was privatized in 1985, and the Japanese National Railways in 1987, and Japan Tobacco and Salt Corporation in 1988. The second category included the major development corporations devoted to housing, agriculture, highways, water resources, ports, energy resources, and urban development projects. The Japanese Highway operators were changed into public-owned private corporations in 2005. In 2003, Japan Post was formed out of the former government-run postal services, but privatization is still pending and a major issue in Japanese politics.

Other categories of corporations included those charged with special government projects, loans and finance, and special types of banking. Local public corporations were involved with utilities.

Public corporations benefited the economy in several ways. Some, like Nippon Telegraph and Telephone Corporation before privatization, were important sources of technology development funds or centers around which private industry could cluster. Others provided vital public services that private industry would find impossible to finance. The development banks, particularly the Japan Development Bank, were sources of long-term investment funds and instrumental in shaping the pattern of industry, especially in the early postwar period. Because public corporations also added revenue to the national budget and were, theoretically, self-financing they required little from the government in the way of financial support. They also provided employment for retired bureaucrats. The reemployment of retired bureaucrats as advisers to these corporations as well as to many private-sector firms was rather common, especially in the late 1960s and early 1970s, under the title amakudari (descent from heaven). The practice was most prevalent in the highly regulated banking, steel, and transportation industries but was also found throughout the Japanese economy.
