= Progressive political parties (Japan) =

Type of political party in Japan

Kakushin seitō (革新政党), meaning reformist political parties or progressive political parties, is an umbrella term used in Japan to refer to a variety of left-leaning political parties generally viewed as "anti-conservative." In the postwar period, it has generally been applied to democratic socialist, social democratic and socially progressive parties that seek to uphold Article 9 of the Japanese Constitution. Japan's "progressive parties" are basically opposed to constitutional amendments led by right-wing conservatives, so they are partly in solidarity with moderate liberal parties. "Kakushin" parties have been considered progressive or radical-liberal forces.

In general, while the Liberal Democratic Party (LDP) has a strong conservative tendency, the Japanese Communist Party (JCP) has shown a strong progressive tendency in the Japanese political spectrum. In the 21st century, not only traditional democratic socialist parties but also some liberal parties began to be regarded as part of the kakushin seitō in the Japanese political context.

== List of kakushin seitō ==
=== During the Japanese Empire ===
- 1922: The Japanese Communist Party (JCP) is founded in Tokyo.
- 1925: The Peace Preservation Law is passed, banning criticism of the system of private property and thus rendering the JCP illegal.
- 1926: During this period, as the proletarian movement grew in strength, the socialist Labour-Farmer Party was founded.
- 1926: At that time, moderate socialists who were compliant with the system formed the Social Democratic Party, which became known as the most conservative among Japan's three major proletarian parties.
- 1928: The Labour-Farmer Party was forcibly disbanded as the government launched a massive crackdown on socialist forces.
- 1932: Moderate leftists supporting the constitutional rule of the Japanese Empire founded the Shakai Taishūtō.
- 1940: With the establishment of a one-party system led by the Shōwa statist Imperial Rule Assistance Association (IRAA), the Shakai Taishūtō was absorbed into IRAA, and all other kakushin seitō were banned.

=== Post-war Japan ===
- 1945: After the end of World War II, Japan's non-communist socialist forces united to form the Japan Socialist Party.
- 1945: In October, the Peace Preservation Law of 1925 was rescinded by the U.S.-led Occupation of Japan and the Japanese Communist Party once again became legal.
- 1950: After World War II, the U.S. military ruled Okinawa, and the opposing left-wing forces founded the Okinawa Social Mass Party.
- 1996: The Japan Socialist Party changed its name to Social Democratic Party.
- 2017: When the centrist/liberal Democratic Party attempted to merge with the right-wing party Kibō no Tō, led by Yuriko Koike, progressive-liberals and constitutionalists in the party opposed to the merger created the liberal-leaning Constitutional Democratic Party of Japan.
- 2019: When the Liberal Party attempted to merge with the centrist/liberal-conservative Democratic Party for the People, left-wing liberals who opposed it founded the Reiwa Shinsengumi.
- 2020: The liberal-leaning Constitutional Democratic Party of Japan ("old" CDP) merged with the centrist/liberal-conservative Democratic Party for the People to create the Constitutional Democratic Party of Japan ("new" CDP).

== Leaders ==
- Tomiichi Murayama

== Controversy ==
The terms "kakushin" and "left-wing" (左派, saha) have been criticized for being misused by mainstream Japanese media and Japanese conservatives as red-baiting terms to attack South Korean liberals for their historically-motivated anti-Japan sentiment. By South Korean political standards, the Democratic Party of Korea (DPK) does not classify itself as a "jinbojeongdang" (Korean: 진보정당; Hanja: 進步政黨) because it is generally considered socially conservative. However, major Japanese media often refer to the Democratic Party of Korea as a "kakushin seitō."

South Korean liberals criticize mainstream Japanese media and conservatives. According to Moon Chung-in, Japanese conservatives pointed out that referring to South Korean liberals as "kakushin" is red-baiting, equating them with the Japan Socialist Party and the Japanese Communist Party. Moon Chung-in also said that Moon Jae-in government and DPK support "Gaehyeok" (改革) in the South Korean political context, but not "kakushin" (革新) or revolution in the Japanese political context.

== See also ==
- Anti-neoliberalism
- Antimilitarism
- Chunichi Shimbun
- Hyukshinkye (South Korea)
- Left-wing populism
- Liberalism in Japan
- New Left in Japan - In the 1960s, Japan's "New Left" criticized the kakushin seitō by calling them "Old Left."
- Pacifism
- Reformism
