= Politics of Japan =

Politics of Japan 日本の政治 (Japanese)
- Government Seal of Japan
- Polity type: Unitary parliamentary constitutional monarchy
- Constitution: Constitution of Japan

Legislative branch
- Name: National Diet
- Type: Bicameral
- Meeting place: National Diet Building
- Upper house
- Name: Senate
- Presiding officer: Masakazu Sekiguchi, President of the Senate
- Lower house
- Name: House of Representatives
- Presiding officer: Eisuke Mori, Speaker of the House of Representatives

Executive branch
- Head of state
- Title: Emperor
- Currently: Naruhito
- Appointer: Hereditary
- Head of government
- Title: Prime Minister
- Currently: Sanae Takaichi
- Appointer: Emperor (Nominated by National Diet)
- Cabinet
- Name: Cabinet of Japan
- Current cabinet: Takaichi Cabinet
- Leader: Prime Minister
- Appointer: Prime Minister
- Headquarters: Naikaku Sōri Daijin Kantei (Prime Minister's Office of Japan)

Judicial branch
- Name: Judiciary
- Supreme Court
- Chief judge: Yukihiko Imasaki, Chief Justice of the Supreme Court
- Seat: Supreme Court Building

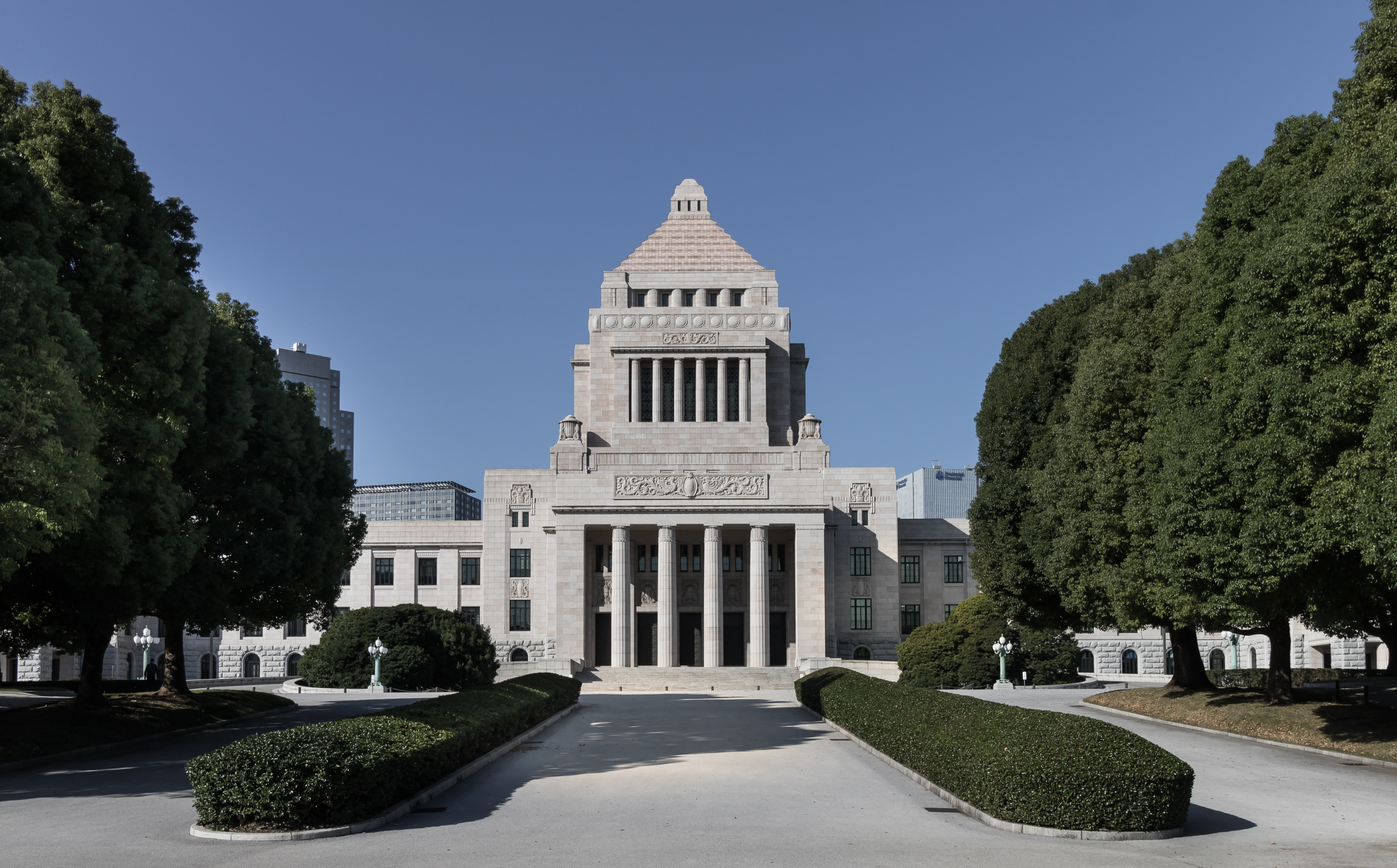
The National Diet Building in Tokyo

In Japan, politics are conducted in a framework of a dominant-party bicameral parliamentary representative democratic constitutional monarchy. A hereditary monarch, currently Emperor Naruhito, serves as head of state while the Prime Minister of Japan, currently Sanae Takaichi since 2025, serves as the elected head of government.

Legislative power is vested in the National Diet, which consists of the House of Representatives and the Senate (formerly called the House of Councillors). The House of Representatives has eighteen standing committees ranging in size from 20 to 50 members and the Senate has sixteen ranging from 10 to 45 members.

Executive power is vested in the Cabinet, which is led by the Prime Minister who is nominated by National Diet and appointed by the Emperor. A Liberal Democratic minority government has held office since 2025.

Judicial power is vested in the Supreme Court and lower courts, and sovereignty is vested in the people of Japan by the 1947 Constitution, which was written during the Occupation of Japan primarily by American officials and had replaced the previous Meiji Constitution. Japan is considered a constitutional monarchy with a system of civil law.

The Japanese politics in the post-war period has largely been dominated by the ruling Liberal Democratic Party (LDP), which has been in power almost continuously since its foundation in 1955, a phenomenon known as the 1955 System. Of the 32 prime ministers since the end of the country's occupation in 1952, 25 as well as the longest serving ones have been members of the LDP.

Japan is currently a "full democracy" in the Democracy Index with the highest V-Dem electoral democracy score and the second highest liberal democracy score in Asia.

== Constitution ==
The current constitution was approved by Japan in 1947, this document aimed to address the weaknesses of the previous Meiji Constitution and lay the foundation for a vibrant democracy in Japan. Its key features include:

- Sovereignty of the People: According to the constitutions, the sovereignty rests with the people.
- Democratic institutions: The constitution reinstated democratic institutions that had flourished under Taisho democracy.
- Expanded Suffrage: The constitution of 1947 expanded suffrage to women guaranteeing equal rights for men and women.
- Parliamentary system: Japan adopted a parliamentary system of government, maintaining a lower house and an upper house, similar to its previous democratic experiences during the Taisho era.
- Labor rights: It introduced Western-type labor practices, including a clause that declared the right to collective bargaining.
- Peace clause: The article 9 of the constitution renounces war and prohibits the threat or use of force as means of settling international disputes.

=== Legitimacy ===
The creation and ratification of this current document has been widely viewed by many geopolitical analysts and historians as one that was forced upon Japan by the United States after the end of World War II.

Although this "imposition" claim arose originally as a rallying cry among conservative politicians in favour of constitutional revision in the 1950s, and that it wasn't "inherently Japanese", it has also been supported by the research of several independent American and Japanese historians of the period.

A competing claim, which also emerged from the political maelstrom of the 1950s revision debate, holds that the ratification decision was actually the result of apparent "collaboration" between American occupation authorities, successive Japanese governments of the time, and private sector "actors".

== Government ==
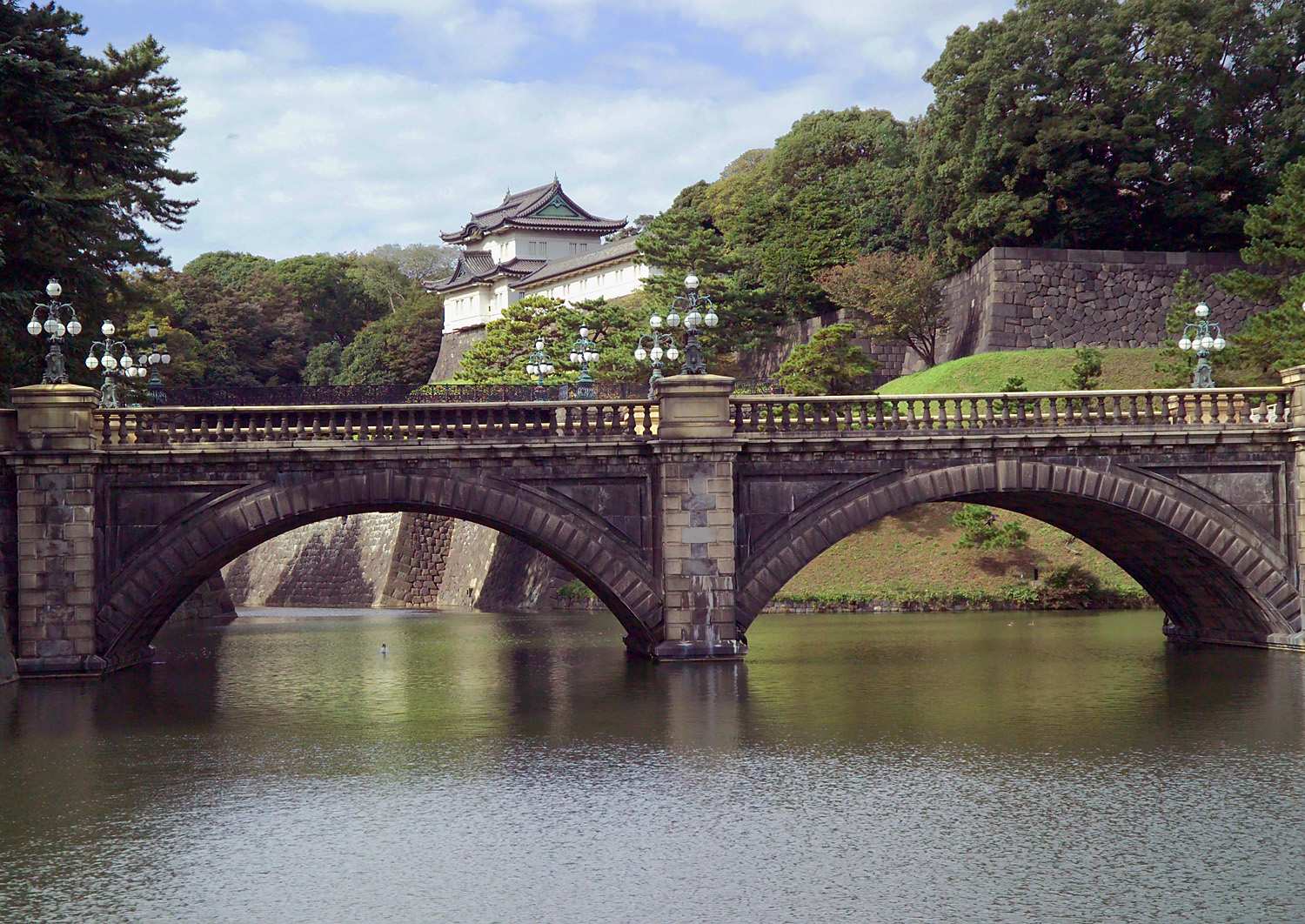
The Imperial Palace in Tokyo has been the primary residence of the Emperor since 1869.

Article 1 of the Constitution of Japan (日本国憲法, Nihon-koku kenpō) defines the Emperor (天皇, Tennō) to be "the symbol of the State and of the unity of the people". He performs ceremonial duties and holds no real power. Political power is held mainly by the Prime Minister, Cabinet, and other elected members of the National Diet. The Imperial Throne is succeeded by a paternal male member of the Imperial House as designated by the Imperial Household Law.

The chief of the executive branch and head of government, the Prime Minister (内閣総理大臣, Naikaku Sōri-Daijin), is appointed by the Emperor as directed by the National Diet. The prime minister in Japan is the head of the cabinet, has the power to appoint and dismiss cabinet ministers, and can dissolve the lower house of the Diet. While formally limited in powers, the prime minister possesses informal powers such as party support, popularity, and influence over the bureaucracy. Individual leadership can significantly impact the policy-making process, especially following recent cabinet reforms that enhanced the prime minister's influence. The Cabinet (内閣, Naikaku) members are nominated by the Prime Minister, and are also required to be civilian. The country has a Liberal Democratic Party (LDP) minority government as of 21 October 2025, and it has been convention that the President of the LDP serves as the Prime Minister since 2012.

== Legislature ==
Japanese constitution states that the National Diet (国会, Kokkai), its law-making institution, shall consist of two Houses, namely the House of Representatives (衆議院, Shūgiin) and the Senate (参議院, Sangiin; formerly called the House of Councillors). The Diet shall be the highest organ of state power, and shall be the sole law-making organ of the State. It states that both Houses shall consist of elected members, representative of all the people and that the number of the members of each House shall be fixed by law. Both houses pass legislation in identical form for it to become law. Similarly to other parliamentary systems, most legislation that is considered in the National Diet is proposed by the cabinet. The cabinet then relies on the expertise of the bureaucracy to draft actual bills.

The lower house, the House of Representatives, the most powerful of the two, holds power over the government, being able to force its resignation. The lower house also has ultimate control of the passage of the budget, the ratification of treaties, and the selection of the Prime Minister. Its power over its sister house is, if a bill is passed by the lower house (the House of Representatives) but is voted down by the upper house (the Senate), the ability to override the decision of the Senate. Members of the lower house, as a result of the Prime Minister's power to dissolve them, more frequently serve for less than four years in any given terms.

The upper house, the Senate, is very weak and bills are sent to the Senate only to be approved, not made. Members of the upper house are elected for six-year terms with half the members elected every three years.

It is possible for different parties to control the lower house and the upper house, a situation referred to as a "twisted Diet", something that has become more common since the JSP took control of the upper house in 1989.

== Political parties and elections ==
Several political parties exist in Japan. However, the politics of Japan have primarily been dominated by the Liberal Democratic Party (LDP) since 1955, with the Democratic Party of Japan (DPJ) playing an important role as the opposition for a lengthy period of time. The DPJ was the ruling party from 2009 to 2012 with the LDP as the opposition. The LDP was the ruling party for decades since 1955, despite the existence of multiple parties. Most of the prime ministers (presidents of the LDP) were elected from inner factions of the LDP.

=== Senate ===
Party	National			Constituency			Seats			
Party	Votes	%	Seats	Votes	%	Seats	Won	Not up	Total after	+/–
Liberal Democratic Party	12,808,307	21.64	12	14,470,017	24.46	27	39	62	101	–13
Democratic Party For the People	7,620,493	12.88	7	7,180,653	12.14	10	17	5	22	+13
Sanseitō	7,425,054	12.55	7	9,264,284	15.66	7	14	1	15	+14
Constitutional Democratic Party	7,397,456	12.50	7	9,119,656	15.42	15	22	16	38	0
Komeito	5,210,569	8.80	4	3,175,791	5.37	4	8	13	21	–6
Japan Innovation Party	4,375,927	7.39	4	3,451,834	5.84	3	7	12	19	+1
Reiwa Shinsengumi	3,879,914	6.56	3	1,881,606	3.18	0	3	3	6	+1
Conservative Party of Japan	2,982,093	5.04	2	652,266	1.10	0	2	0	2	New
Japanese Communist Party	2,864,738	4.84	2	2,831,672	4.79	1	3	4	7	–4
Team Mirai	1,517,890	2.56	1	956,674	1.62	0	1	0	1	New
Social Democratic Party	1,217,823	2.06	1	302,775	0.51	0	1	1	2	0
NHK Party	682,626	1.15	0	740,740	1.25	0	0	1	1	–1
The Path to Rebirth	524,788	0.89	0	128,746	0.22	0	0	0	0	New
Japan Seishinkai	333,263	0.56	0	223,067	0.38	0	0	0	0	New
Independents Coalition	289,222	0.49	0	341,437	0.58	0	0	0	0	New
Japan Reform Party	55,232	0.09	0	74,274	0.13	0	0	0	0	New
Genzei Nippon				254,938	0.43	0	0	0	0	New
Conservative Party of Nippon				129,130	0.22	0	0	0	0	New
Association for the Protection of Japanese Families				23,686	0.04	0	0	0	0	New
Collaborative Party				6,292	0.01	0	0	0	0	New
Party for Tax Reduction				5,387	0.01	0	0	0	0	New
New Party Kunimori				4,832	0.01	0	0	0	0	New
New Party Yamato				3,885	0.01	0	0	0	0	New
Saigo Party				1,805	0.00	0	0	0	0	New
Nuclear Fusion Party				1,611	0.00	0	0	0	0	0
World Peace Party				1,494	0.00	0	0	0	0	New
Savior-Making Party				1,292	0.00	0	0	0	0	New
Independents				3,923,802	6.63	8	8	5	13	+1
Total	59,185,395	100.00	50	59,153,646	100.00	75	125	123	248	0
Valid votes	59,185,735	97.65		59,153,646	97.59					
Invalid/blank votes	1,422,497	2.35		1,460,129	2.41					
Total votes	60,608,232	100.00		60,613,775	100.00					
Registered voters/turnout	103,591,806	58.51		103,591,806	58.51					
Source: Ministry of Internal Affairs and Communications

=== By constituency ===
Constituency	Total seats	Seats won											
Constituency	Total seats	LDP	CDP	DPP	Sansei	Komei	Ishin	JCP	Reiwa	CPJ	Mirai	SDP	Ind.
Aichi	4	1	1	1	1								
Akita	1												1
Aomori	1		1										
Chiba	3	1	1	1									
Ehime	1												1
Fukui	1	1											
Fukuoka	3	1			1	1							
Fukushima	1	1											
Gifu	1	1											
Gunma	1	1											
Hiroshima	2	1	1										
Hokkaido	3	2	1										
Hyōgo	3	1				1							1
Ibaraki	2	1			1								
Ishikawa	1	1											
Iwate	1		1										
Kagawa	1			1									
Kagoshima	1												1
Kanagawa	4	1	1	1	1								
Kumamoto	1	1											
Kyoto	2	1					1						
Mie	1		1										
Miyagi	1		1										
Miyazaki	1		1										
Nagano	1		1										
Nagasaki	1	1											
Nara	1	1											
Niigata	1		1										
Ōita	1		1										
Okinawa	1												1
Okayama	1	1											
Osaka	4				1	1	2						
Saga	1	1											
Saitama	4	1	1	1	1								
Shiga	1	1											
Shizuoka	2	1		1									
Tochigi	1	1											
Tokushima–Kōchi	1												1
Tokyo	7	1	1	2	1	1		1					
Tottori–Shimane	1	1											
Toyama	1			1									
Wakayama	1												1
Yamagata	1												1
Yamaguchi	1	1											
Yamanashi	1			1									
National	50	12	7	7	7	4	4	2	3	2	1	1	
Total	125	39	22	17	14	8	7	3	3	2	1	1	8

=== House of Representatives ===
The LDP won a landslide victory, with the party winning an outright two-thirds supermajority and regaining its majority status in the chamber. The LDP's total of at least 316 seats is the most ever won by a party in Japanese post-war electoral history, surpassing the previous record of 308 seats won by the DPJ in the 2009 election and its own record of 300 seats in the 1986 election, as well as its previous record in terms of the share of seats from the 1960 election. The total LDP–JIP coalition, including 36 seats from JIP, now composed three-fourths of the House of Representatives. It was also the first time that the second-place party had fewer than 50 seats in Japan's postwar history.

The LDP actually won enough votes to get 330 seats; however, due to so few district candidates from the LDP losing, it did not have enough candidates to fill its seats in the proportional tier. The LDP therefore forfeited 14 seats to other parties, including 6 in the Southern Kantō block, 5 in the Tokyo block, 2 in the Hokuriku-Shin'etsu block, and 1 in the Chūgoku block. These 14 seats went to the CRA (6), DPP (2), Ishin (2), Team Mirai (2), Sanseitō (1), and Reiwa Shinsengumi (1). Meanwhile, Team Mirai forfeited two seats in the Kinki block, as its district candidates did not cross the 10% eligibility threshold to be elected from the proportional tier; these two seats went to the CRA and Ishin.

Party	Proportional			Constituency			Total seats	+/–
Party	Votes	%	Seats	Votes	%	Seats	Total seats	+/–
Liberal Democratic Party	21,026,139	36.72	67	27,710,493	49.09	249	316	+125
Centrist Reform Alliance	10,438,801	18.23	42	12,209,642	21.63	7	49	–123
Democratic Party For the People	5,572,951	9.73	20	4,243,282	7.52	8	28	0
Japan Innovation Party	4,943,330	8.63	16	3,742,161	6.63	20	36	–2
Sanseitō	4,260,620	7.44	15	3,924,223	6.95	0	15	+12
Team Mirai	3,813,749	6.66	11	156,853	0.28	0	11	New
Japanese Communist Party	2,519,807	4.40	4	2,283,885	4.05	0	4	–4
Reiwa Shinsengumi	1,672,499	2.92	1	255,496	0.45	0	1	–8
Conservative Party of Japan	1,455,563	2.54	0	97,753	0.17	0	0	–3
Tax Cuts Japan and Yukoku Alliance	814,874	1.42	0	354,617	0.63	1	1	New
Social Democratic Party	728,602	1.27	0	148,666	0.26	0	0	–1
Consideration the Euthanasia System	13,014	0.02	0				0	0
Independent Alliance				16,829	0.03	0	0	New
Nihon Yamato Party				15,213	0.03	0	0	New
Japan Liberal Party				12,885	0.02	0	0	New
The Path to Rebirth				12,492	0.02	0	0	New
First Star				2,686	0.00	0	0	New
World Peace Party				2,424	0.00	0	0	New
Future Progressive Party				2,068	0.00	0	0	New
Nuclear Fusion Party				916	0.00	0	0	New
Party of the Heart				795	0.00	0	0	0
Independents				1,253,346	2.22	4	4	–8
Total	57,259,949	100.00	176	56,446,725	100.00	289	465	0
Valid votes	57,259,949	98.62		54,446,726	97.12			
Invalid/blank votes	799,769	1.38		1,614,994	2.88			
Total votes	58,059,718	100.00		56,061,720	100.00			
Registered voters/turnout	103,211,223	56.25		103,211,224	54.32			
Source: Ministry of Internal Affairs and Communications

=== By constituency ===
Cartogram of single-member constituencies and proportional blocs

Prefecture	Total seats	Seats won					
Prefecture	Total seats	LDP	Ishin	DPP	CRA	Genyu	Ind.
Aichi	16	12		3		1	
Akita	3	2		1			
Aomori	3	3					
Chiba	14	13			1		
Ehime	3	3					
Fukui	2	2					
Fukuoka	11	10					1
Fukushima	4	4					
Gifu	5	5					
Gunma	5	5					
Hiroshima	6	6					
Hokkaido	12	11			1		
Hyōgo	12	11	1				
Ibaraki	7	5		1			1
Ishikawa	3	3					
Iwate	3	2			1		
Kagawa	3	1		1	1		
Kagoshima	4	3			1		
Kanagawa	20	20					
Kōchi	2	2					
Kumamoto	4	4					
Kyoto	6	4	1		1		
Mie	4	4					
Miyagi	5	5					
Miyazaki	3	1		1	1		
Nagano	5	5					
Nagasaki	3	2		1			
Nara	3	3					
Niigata	5	5					
Ōita	3	3					
Okayama	4	4					
Okinawa	4	4					
Osaka	19	1	18				
Saga	2	2					
Saitama	16	16					
Shiga	3	3					
Shimane	2	2					
Shizuoka	8	8					
Tochigi	5	4					1
Tokushima	2	2					
Tokyo	30	30					
Tottori	2	2					
Toyama	3	3					
Wakayama	2	1					1
Yamagata	3	3					
Yamaguchi	3	3					
Yamanashi	2	2					
Total	289	249	20	8	7	1	4

=== By PR block ===
PR block	Total seats	LDP		CRA		DPP		Ishin		Sansei		Mirai		JCP		Reiwa	
PR block	Total seats	Votes (%)	Seats	Votes (%)	Seats	Votes (%)	Seats	Votes (%)	Seats	Votes (%)	Seats	Votes (%)	Seats	Votes (%)	Seats	Votes (%)	Seats
Chūgoku	10	43.2	5	20.6	2	9.1	1	7.1	1	8.4	1	—	—	3.7	0	2.9	0
Hokkaido	8	37.0	4	24.6	3	8.9	1	3.8	0	6.6	0	5.5	0	5.4	0	3.1	0
Hokuriku–Shinetsu	10	42.1	3	19.8	4	9.8	1	7.0	1	8.7	1	—	—	4.3	0	3.0	0
Kinki	28	30.4	10	14.3	5	7.0	2	23.2	8	6.8	2	5.9	0	5.1	1	2.6	0
Kyushu	20	39.9	10	18.7	4	8.0	2	5.9	1	8.2	2	5.9	1	3.3	0	3.3	0
Northern Kanto	19	37.0	8	19.3	4	10.3	2	5.3	1	8.3	2	7.7	1	4.2	1	3.0	0
Shikoku	6	42.0	4	18.2	1	13.0	1	7.4	0	8.4	0	—	—	4.2	0	3.0	0
Southern Kanto	23	35.6	4	19.2	7	10.6	3	6.2	2	7.2	2	9.2	3	4.2	1	2.7	1
Tohoku	12	41.2	6	21.2	3	9.9	1	4.2	0	7.1	1	6.0	1	4.0	0	3.1	0
Tōkai	21	37.7	10	17.2	4	12.0	3	5.7	1	7.6	2	6.9	1	3.5	0	3.1	0
Tokyo	19	33.1	3	16.5	5	11.0	3	5.7	1	6.3	2	13.1	4	6.0	1	2.6	0
Total	176	36.7	67	18.2	42	9.7	20	8.6	16	7.4	15	6.7	11	4.4	4	2.9	1
Source: NHK

=== Party-list vote by prefecture ===
Prefecture	Party-list vote (%)							
Prefecture	LDP	CRA	DPP	Ishin	Sansei	Mirai	JCP	Reiwa
Aichi	36.0	16.3	12.2	6.3	7.4	7.4	3.6	2.9
Akita	44.3	17.1	14.8	5.5	5.3	4.4	3.4	2.4
Aomori	42.2	22.6	8.5	3.6	6.6	5.1	4.4	3.5
Chiba	37.0	20.3	10.2	5.2	7.4	8.4	4.0	2.6
Ehime	44.7	19.9	8.8	6.8	9.7	—	3.2	3.1
Fukui	45.7	15.6	10.0	7.6	11.9	—	2.3	2.4
Fukuoka	37.3	18.5	8.7	6.9	8.3	7.3	3.5	2.9
Fukushima	42.2	23.6	7.8	3.7	7.3	5.3	4.1	2.8
Gifu	40.9	17.3	9.9	5.4	8.2	6.2	3.3	3.6
Gunma	38.5	18.7	8.8	4.6	10.2	6.9	4.3	3.1
Hiroshima	40.1	21.0	10.3	8.3	8.2	—	3.5	3.0
Hokkaido	37.0	24.6	8.9	3.8	6.6	5.5	5.4	3.1
Hyōgo	33.9	16.1	7.1	17.8	7.0	6.4	4.2	2.7
Ibaraki	40.8	18.5	9.8	5.4	8.3	6.5	3.3	2.9
Ishikawa	44.7	15.3	10.9	8.7	9.6	—	3.0	2.9
Iwate	38.5	22.2	9.9	3.7	7.4	5.8	4.8	3.9
Kagawa	39.4	15.0	23.3	6.9	6.6	—	2.7	2.3
Kagoshima	44.6	19.3	6.2	5.0	8.3	6.0	2.6	2.8
Kanagawa	34.2	18.2	11.2	7.1	7.0	10.0	4.4	2.7
Kōchi	41.0	20.0	8.7	5.5	8.5	—	8.6	3.6
Kumamoto	43.0	17.0	6.6	6.2	9.8	5.8	2.8	3.2
Kyoto	32.3	15.2	7.5	14.9	6.5	6.8	9.1	2.8
Mie	38.8	21.5	8.2	5.7	8.1	5.9	3.2	3.1
Miyagi	39.1	21.9	8.3	4.8	8.1	7.8	4.0	2.8
Miyazaki	41.4	19.2	9.8	6.4	7.7	4.2	2.7	3.1
Nagano	36.6	22.9	9.8	6.7	8.1	—	6.6	3.7
Nagasaki	42.7	18.5	10.7	5.9	6.9	4.9	2.8	2.9
Nara	43.6	12.6	7.9	15.2	5.2	5.0	4.2	2.1
Niigata	43.5	22.6	8.5	5.8	7.6	—	3.7	2.9
Ōita	38.2	21.6	7.6	5.7	8.3	5.1	3.2	2.8
Okayama	44.5	20.1	8.6	6.7	8.2	—	4.0	2.7
Okinawa	35.3	19.6	6.8	4.2	7.8	5.0	6.3	6.4
Osaka	23.6	13.3	6.2	32.3	6.7	5.6	4.8	2.6
Saga	42.9	16.7	6.5	3.9	7.8	4.9	2.0	2.6
Saitama	34.2	19.8	11.0	5.5	7.7	8.7	4.8	2.9
Shiga	36.4	12.7	8.9	15.6	7.4	6.5	4.9	3.3
Shimane	45.4	22.5	7.8	5.2	7.7	—	4.2	2.9
Shizuoka	38.8	16.8	14.5	4.7	7.3	6.6	3.4	3.4
Tochigi	40.9	18.8	9.6	5.4	8.5	6.2	2.7	3.2
Tokushima	41.6	17.9	10.6	10.9	8.4	—	3.7	3.2
Tokyo	33.1	16.5	11.0	5.7	6.3	13.1	6.0	2.6
Tottori	39.6	28.0	8.1	5.2	7.7	—	4.0	2.8
Toyama	45.6	14.3	11.5	8.5	9.0	—	3.2	2.6
Wakayama	40.1	15.3	7.6	13.5	7.6	4.5	4.9	2.7
Yamagata	42.9	16.7	14.0	3.9	6.7	5.7	3.4	3.5
Yamaguchi	47.1	17.2	8.4	7.0	9.5	—	3.1	3.0
Yamanashi	40.7	22.2	7.9	4.2	7.5	5.9	3.9	3.3
Total votes	36.7	18.2	9.7	8.6	7.4	6.7	4.4	2.9
Source: NHK

== Policy making ==
Despite an increasingly unpredictable domestic and international environment, policy making conforms to well established postwar patterns. The close collaboration of the ruling party, the elite bureaucracy and important interest groups often make it difficult to tell who exactly is responsible for specific policy decisions.

=== Policy development in Japan ===
After a largely informal process within elite circles in which ideas were discussed and developed, steps might be taken to institute more formal policy development. This process often took place in deliberation councils (shingikai). There were about 200 shingikai, each attached to a ministry; their members were both officials and prominent private individuals in business, education, and other fields. The shingikai played a large role in facilitating communication among those who ordinarily might not meet.

Given the tendency for real negotiations in Japan to be conducted privately (in the nemawashi, or root binding, process of consensus building), the shingikai often represented a fairly advanced stage in policy formulation in which relatively minor differences could be thrashed out and the resulting decisions couched in language acceptable to all. These bodies were legally established but had no authority to oblige governments to adopt their recommendations. The most important deliberation council during the 1980s was the Provisional Commission for Administrative Reform, established in March 1981 by Prime Minister Suzuki Zenko. The commission had nine members, assisted in their deliberations by six advisers, twenty-one "expert members," and around fifty "councillors" representing a wide range of groups. Its head, Keidanren president Doko Toshio, insisted that the government agree to take its recommendations seriously and commit itself to reforming the administrative structure and the tax system.

In 1982, the commission had arrived at several recommendations that by the end of the decade had been actualized. These implementations included tax reform, a policy to limit government growth, the establishment in 1984 of the Management and Coordination Agency to replace the Administrative Management Agency in the Office of the Prime Minister, and privatization of the state-owned railroad and telephone systems. In April 1990, another deliberation council, the Election Systems Research Council, submitted proposals that included the establishment of single-seat constituencies in place of the multiple-seat system.

Another significant policy-making institution in the early 1990s was the Liberal Democratic Party's Policy Research Council. It consisted of a number of committees, composed of LDP Diet members, with the committees corresponding to the different executive agencies. Committee members worked closely with their official counterparts, advancing the requests of their constituents, in one of the most effective means through which interest groups could state their case to the bureaucracy through the channel of the ruling party.

== Opinion polls ==
A 2026 Ipsos opinion poll found the most common political issues were inflation, low wages and taxation.

== History ==
=== Post-war ===
Political parties had begun to revive almost immediately after the Allied occupation began because of surrender of Japan in World War II. Left-wing organizations, such as the Japan Socialist Party and the Japanese Communist Party, quickly reestablished themselves, as did various conservative parties. The old Rikken Seiyūkai and Rikken Minseitō came back as, the Liberal Party (Nihon Jiyūtō) and the Japan Progressive Party (Nihon Shimpotō) respectively. The first postwar general election was held in 1946 (women were given the franchise for the first time in 1946), and the Liberal Party's vice president, Yoshida Shigeru (1878–1967), became prime minister.

For the 1947 general election, anti-Yoshida forces left the Liberal Party and joined forces with the Progressive Party to establish the new Democratic Party (Minshutō). This divisiveness in conservative ranks gave a plurality to the Japan Socialist Party, which was allowed to form a cabinet, which lasted less than a year. Thereafter, the socialist party steadily declined in its electoral successes. After a short period of Democratic Party administration, Yoshida returned in late 1948 and continued to serve as prime minister until 1954.

Even before Japan regained full sovereignty, the government had rehabilitated nearly 80,000 people who had been purged, many of whom returned to their former political and government positions. A debate over limitations on military spending and the sovereignty of the Emperor ensued, contributing to the great reduction in the Liberal Party's majority in the first post-occupation elections (October 1952). After several reorganizations of the armed forces, in 1954 the Japan Self-Defense Forces (JSDF) were established under a civilian director. Cold War realities and the hot war in nearby Korea also contributed significantly to the United States-influenced economic redevelopment, the suppression of communism, and the discouragement of organized labor in Japan during this period.

Continual fragmentation of parties and a succession of minority governments led conservative forces to merge the Liberal Party (Jiyūtō) with the Japan Democratic Party (Nihon Minshutō), an offshoot of the earlier Democratic Party, to form the Liberal Democratic Party (Jiyū-Minshutō; LDP) in November 1955, called 1955 System. This party continuously held power from 1955 through 1993, except for a short while when it was replaced by a new minority government. LDP leadership was drawn from the elite who had seen Japan through the defeat and occupation. It attracted former bureaucrats, local politicians, businessmen, journalists, other professionals, farmers, and university graduates.

In October 1955, socialist groups reunited under the Japan Socialist Party (JSP), which emerged as the second most powerful political force. It was followed closely in popularity by the Komeito, founded in 1964 as the political arm of the Soka Gakkai (Value Creation Society), until 1991, a lay organization affiliated with the Nichiren Shōshū Buddhist sect. The Komeito emphasized the traditional Japanese beliefs and attracted urban laborers, former rural residents, and women. Like the Japan Socialist Party, it favored the gradual modification and dissolution of the Japan-United States Mutual Security Assistance Pact.

=== 1990s ===
The LDP domination lasted until the National Diet Lower House general election on 18 July 1993, in which LDP failed to win a majority. A coalition of new parties and existing opposition parties formed a governing majority and elected a new non-LDP prime minister, Morihiro Hosokawa (leader of Japan New Party), in August 1993. His government's major legislative objective was political reform, consisting of a package of new political financing restrictions and major changes in the electoral system. The coalition succeeded in passing landmark political reform legislation in January 1994.

In April 1994, Prime Minister Hosokawa resigned. Prime Minister Tsutomu Hata (leader of Japan Renewal Party) formed the successor coalition government, Japan's first minority government in almost 40 years. Prime Minister Hata resigned less than two months later. Prime Minister Tomiichi Murayama (leader of JSP) formed the next government in June 1994 with the coalition of JSP, the LDP, and the small New Party Sakigake. The advent of a coalition containing the JSP and LDP shocked many observers because of their previously fierce rivalry.

Prime Minister Murayama served from June 1994 to January 1996. He was succeeded by Prime Minister Ryutaro Hashimoto (president of the LDP), who served from January 1996 to July 1998. Prime Minister Hashimoto headed a loose coalition of three parties until the July 1998 Upper House election, when the two smaller parties cut ties with the LDP. Hashimoto resigned due to a poor electoral performance by the LDP in the Upper House elections. He was succeeded as party president of the LDP and prime minister by Keizō Obuchi, who took office on 30 July 1998. The LDP formed a governing coalition with the Liberal Party in January 1999, and Obuchi remained prime minister. The LDP-Liberal coalition expanded to include the New Komeito Party in October 1999.

=== 2000s ===
Prime Minister Obuchi suffered a stroke in April 2000 and was replaced by Yoshirō Mori. After the Liberal Party left the coalition in April 2000, Prime Minister Mori welcomed a Liberal Party splinter group, the New Conservative Party, into the ruling coalition. The three-party coalition made up of the LDP, New Komeito, and the New Conservative Party maintained its majority in the Diet following the June 2000 Lower House elections.

After a turbulent year in office in which he saw his approval ratings plummet to the single digits, Prime Minister Mori agreed to hold early elections for the LDP presidency in order to improve his party's chances in crucial July 2001 Upper House elections. On 24 April 2001, riding a wave of grassroots desire for change, maverick politician Junichiro Koizumi defeated former prime minister Hashimoto and other party stalwarts on a platform of economic and political reform.

Koizumi was elected as Japan's 56th Prime Minister on 26 April 2001. On 11 October 2003, Prime Minister Koizumi dissolved the lower house and he was re-elected as the president of the LDP. Likewise, that year, the LDP won the general election, even though it suffered setbacks from the new opposition party, the liberal and social-democratic Democratic Party (DPJ). A similar event occurred during the 2004 Upper House election as well.

On 8 August 2005, Prime Minister Junichiro Koizumi called for a snap general election to the lower house, as threatened, after LDP stalwarts and opposition DPJ parliamentarians defeated his proposal for a large-scale reform and privatization of Japan Post, which besides being Japan's state-owned postal monopoly is arguably the world's largest financial institution, with nearly 331 trillion yen of assets. The election was scheduled for 11 September 2005, with the LDP achieving a landslide victory under Junichiro Koizumi's leadership.

The ruling LDP started losing hold in 2006. No prime minister except Koizumi had good public support. On 26 September 2006, the new LDP President Shinzo Abe was elected by a special session of the National Diet to succeed Junichiro Koizumi as the next prime minister. He was Japan's youngest post-World War II prime minister and the first born after the war. On 12 September 2007, Abe surprised Japan by announcing his resignation from office. He was replaced by Yasuo Fukuda, a veteran of LDP.

In the meantime, on 4 November 2007, the leader of the main opposition party, Ichirō Ozawa announced his resignation from the post of party president, after controversy over an offer to the DPJ to join the ruling coalition in a grand coalition, but has since, with some embarrassment, rescinded his resignation.

On 11 January 2008, Prime Minister Yasuo Fukuda forced a bill allowing ships to continue a refueling mission in the Indian Ocean in support of US-led operations in Afghanistan. To do so, PM Fukuda used the LDP's overwhelming majority in the Lower House to ignore a previous "no-vote" of the opposition-controlled Upper House. This was the first time in 50 years that the Lower House voted to ignore the opinion of the Upper House. Fukuda resigned suddenly on 1 September 2008, just a few weeks after reshuffling his cabinet. On 1 September 2008, Fukuda's resignation was designed so that the LDP did not suffer a "power vacuum". It thus caused a leadership election within the LDP, and the winner, Tarō Asō (Shigeru Yoshida's grandson) was chosen as the new LDP president on 24 September 2008, he was appointed as the 92nd Prime Minister after the House of Representatives voted in his favor in the extraordinary session of the National Diet.

Later, on 21 July 2009, Prime Minister Asō dissolved the House of Representatives and general election was held on 30 August. The election results for the House of Representatives were announced on 30 and 31 August 2009. The opposition party DPJ led by Yukio Hatoyama (Ichirō Hatoyama's grandson), won a majority by gaining 308 seats (10 seats were won by its allies the Social Democratic Party and the People's New Party). On 16 September 2009, the leader of DPJ, Hatoyama was elected by the House of Representatives as the 93rd Prime Minister of Japan.

=== 2010s ===
On 2 June 2010, Hatoyama resigned due to lack of fulfillments of his policies, both domestically and internationally and soon after, on 8 June, Akihito, Emperor of Japan ceremonially swore in the newly elected DPJ's leader, Naoto Kan as the 94th prime minister. Kan suffered an early setback in the 2010 Japanese House of Councillors election. In a routine political change in Japan, DPJ's new leader and former finance minister of Kan Cabinet, Yoshihiko Noda was cleared and elected by the National Diet as 95th prime minister on 30 August 2011. He was officially appointed as prime minister in the attestation ceremony by Emperor Akihito at the Tokyo Imperial Palace on 2 September 2011.

Noda dissolved the lower house on 16 November 2012 (as he failed to get support outside the Diet on various domestic issues i.e. consumption tax, nuclear energy) and general election was held on 16 December. The results were in favor of the LDP, which won an absolute majority in the leadership of former prime minister Shinzo Abe. He was appointed as the 96th Prime Minister of Japan on 26 December 2012. With the changing political situation, earlier in November 2014, Prime Minister Abe called for a fresh mandate for the Lower House. In an opinion poll the government failed to win public trust due to bad economic achievements in the two consecutive quarters and on the tax reforms.

The general election was held on 14 December 2014, and the results were in favor of the LDP and its ally New Komeito. Together they managed to secure a huge majority by winning 325 seats for the Lower House. The opposition, DPJ, could not manage to provide alternatives to the voters with its policies and programs. "Abenomics", the ambitious self-titled fiscal policy of the current prime minister, managed to attract more voters in this election, many Japanese voters supported the policies. Shinzō Abe was sworn as the 97th prime minister on 24 December 2014 and would go ahead with his agenda of economic revitalization and structural reforms in Japan.

Prime Minister Abe was elected again for a fourth term after the 2017 general election. It was a snap election called by Prime Minister Shinzo Abe. Abe's ruling coalition won a clear majority with more than two-thirds of 465 seats in the lower house of Parliament (House of Representatives). The opposition was in deep political crisis.

In July 2019, Japan had a national election. The ruling Liberal Democratic Party (LDP) of Prime Minister Abe won a majority of seats in the upper house of Parliament (House of Councillors, now called the Senate). However, Abe failed to achieve the two-thirds majority, and the ruling coalition could not amend the constitution.

=== 2020s ===
Contemporary issues such as economic challenges, demographic shifts, and environmental concerns play a significant role in shaping political discourse, highlighting the interplay between these social issues and political responses. Ultimately, the potential for overcoming anxiety over governance is a critical theme, suggesting that increased political participation and engagement could lead to more effective governance and a reduction in public anxiety, all of which contribute to the complex and dynamic nature of Japanese politics.

On 28 August 2020, following reports of ill-health, Abe resigned citing health concerns, triggering a leadership election to replace him as prime minister. Abe was the longest-serving prime minister in the political history of Japan.

After winning the leadership of the governing Liberal Democratic Party (LDP), Chief Cabinet Secretary Yoshihide Suga, a close ally of his predecessor, was elected as the 99th prime minister of Japan on 16 September 2020. On 2 September 2021, Suga announced that he would not seek reelection as LDP President, effectively ending his term as prime minister. On 4 October 2021, Fumio Kishida took office as new prime minister. Kishida was elected leader of the ruling Liberal Democratic Party (LDP) previous week. He was officially confirmed as the 100th prime minister following a parliamentary vote with appointment by Emperor Naruhito at Tokyo Imperial Palace. On 31 October 2021, the ruling Liberal Democratic Party (LDP) held onto its single party majority in the general election.

On 8 July 2022, former prime minister Shinzo Abe was shot and killed at a campaign rally in Nara for the 2022 Japanese House of Councillors election. State funeral of Abe was held on 27 September at Nippon Budokan.

The Economist Intelligence Unit (EIU) rated Japan a "full democracy" its report for 2023. According to the V-Dem Democracy indices, Japan was the 23rd most electoral democratic country in the world as of 2023.

On 1 October 2024, Japan’s parliament confirmed Shigeru Ishiba, new leader of the ruling Liberal Democratic Party (LDP), as the new prime minister to replace Fumio Kishida.

Ishiba announced his resignation as prime minister on 7 September 2025, following a decline in public approval ratings to 23% and weeks of infighting in the LDP. In October 2025, Sanae Takaichi was elected to succeed him as party president, becoming the first woman to serve in the role. Later that same month, Komeito announced that it would leave the ruling coalition. She became prime minister on 21 October, after signing a confidence and supply agreement with Ishin.

== See also ==
- Anarchism in Japan
- Censorship in Japan
- Conservatism in Japan
- Foreign relations of Japan
- Government of Japan
- Law of Japan
- Liberalism in Japan
- Honebuto no hōshin
- Neoconservatism in Japan
- Political extremism in Japan
- Progressivism in Japan
- Socialism in Japan
- Political status of women in Japan
- Anti-fascism
- Post–World War II anti-fascism
