= List of Japanese films of 1968 =

A list of films released in Japan in 1968 (see 1968 in film).

== List of films ==
Japanese films released in 1968
Title	Japanese Title	Release date	Director	Cast	Genre	Notes
	送り狼	1968.__.__	Akitaka Kimata			
	或る色魔	1968.__.__	Akitaka Kimata			
	ユートピアベィビィ	1968.__.__	小山甫			
	猟色の罠	1968.__.__	Akitaka Kimata			
	鞭と陰獣	1968.__.__	Haruo Matsubara			
	セックス	1968.__.__	Kinya Ogawa			
	CONFESSION 遙かなる憧れギロチン恋の旅	1968.__.__	Nobuhiko Ōbayashi			
	にっぽん零年	1968.__.__	Kazuo Kawabe, Shigeya Fujita			
	歓びのセックス	1968.__.__	Toshio Okuwaki			
	続・花と蛇 赤い拷問	1968.__.__	Haruo Matsubara			
	悪女乱行	1968.__.__	Kinya Ogawa			
	悪徳女高医	1968.__.__	Hajime Sasaki			
	朝まで抱いて	1968.__.__	Hajime Sasaki			
	夜の歓楽街 あな探し	1968.__.__	Kan Mukai			
	甘い色魔	1968.__.__	Hisashi Yamauchi			
	妖しい性の女	1968.__.__	Takeo Takagi			
	恐怖のサディスト 異常性犯罪	1968.__.__	Kōji Seki			
	刑法208条 異常暴行罪	1968.__.__	Toshio Okuwaki			
	異常体験	1968.__.__	Toshio Okuwaki			
	色狼	1968.__.__	Hajime Sasaki			
	色板道	1968.__.__	Kiyoshi Komori			
	うぶ殺し	1968.__.__	Shōji Shinagawa			
	犯す	1968.__.__	Atsushi Yamatoya			
	恐るべき密戯	1968.__.__	Akitaka Kimata			
	男と女の肉時計	1968.__.__	Kan Mukai			
	お妾女高生	1968.__.__	Hajime Sasaki			
	女が乱れるとき	1968.__.__	Hajime Sasaki			
	女の奥底	1968.__.__	Masanao Sakao			
	女の痙攣	1968.__.__	Toshio Okuwaki			
	女の順番 いろごのみ	1968.__.__	中川順夫			
	回春部屋+	1968.__.__	Mamoru Watanabe			
	狂い花	1968.__.__	風魔三郎			
	狂った夫婦生活	1968.__.__	北見一郎			
	狂った牝猫	1968.__.__	Akitaka Kimata			
	現代夫婦読本	1968.__.__	Shinya Yamamoto			
	好色ガードマン	1968.__.__	Hajime Sasaki			
	0号夫人の告白より 好色秘話	1968.__.__				
	告白 現代（秘）女残酷史	1968.__.__	大沼寛			
	殺しのセックス	1968.__.__	Ryōsuke Kurahashi			
	好色番外地 色道仁義	1968.__.__	Hideki Miki			
	色欲地獄	1968.__.__	石垣伝			
	灼熱の暴行	1968.__.__	Akitaka Kimata			
	獣欲の女	1968.__.__	Haruo Matsubara			
	情怨の穴場	1968.__.__	Haruo Matsubara			
	情欲の陥し穴	1968.__.__	Kan Kataoka			
	女学生の寝室	1968.__.__	Ario Takeda			
	女子学生 処女遊び	1968.__.__	Shōji Shinagawa			
	処女強奪	1968.__.__	Kinya Ogawa			
	処女の生理	1968.__.__	Shinya Yamamoto			
	処女暴落	1968.__.__	Kinya Ogawa			
	女郎刑罰史	1968.__.__	Mamoru Watanabe			
	真実の処女	1968.__.__	Osamu Yamashita			
	新人四十八手 裏表	1968.__.__	Kaoru Umezawa			
	すすり泣き 非行性犯罪	1968.__.__	Seiichi Fukuda			
	絶唱	1968.__.__	安芸敬三			
	胎児の子守唄	1968.__.__	Osamu Yamashita			
	血と肉の鍵	1968.__.__	常田一郎			
	乳房の絶叫	1968.__.__	Hideki Miki			
	東西情婦くらべ	1968.__.__	中川順夫			
	とこ惚れ	1968.__.__	Masanao Sakao			
	肉体手形	1968.__.__	Shintarō Kishi			
	肉体の餌	1968.__.__	Kaoru Umezawa			
	肉泥棒	1968.__.__	Masanao Sakao			
	肉風呂	1968.__.__	Kaoru Umezawa			
	肉魔	1968.__.__	Hideki Miki			
	肉欲の地獄	1968.__.__	常田一郎			
	濡れた人妻	1968.__.__	Toshio Okuwaki			
	濡れ濡れ	1968.__.__	中川順夫			
	覗く 透明のテクニック	1968.__.__	Kōji Seki			
	激しい愛撫	1968.__.__	Osamu Yamashita			
	半処女学生	1968.__.__	Takeo Takagi			
	婦女惨殺！！	1968.__.__	Kinya Ogawa			
	続・不良女学生	1968.__.__	Ario Takeda			
	変質者	1968.__.__	Ario Takeda			
	真昼の強姦	1968.__.__	Shinya Yamamoto			
	不見転処女	1968.__.__	Masanao Sakao			
	女獣	1968.__.__	石垣伝			
	現代悪女伝 牝のかまきり	1968.__.__	Mamoru Watanabe			
	牝蛇	1968.__.__	Ario Takeda			
	もち肌くずれ	1968.__.__	Seiichi Fukuda			
	柔肌の手なぐさみ	1968.__.__	Haruo Matsubara			
	妖婦の生態	1968.__.__	Seiichi Fukuda			
	夜を待つ乳房	1968.__.__	Satoru Kobayashi			
	夜の本番 未亡人ご指名	1968.__.__	Kan Mukai			
	凄艶 四所斬り	1968.__.__	Kiyoshi Komori			
Tournament	京	1968.__.__	Kon Ichikawa		Documentary	
	ザ・スパイダースの大進撃	1968.01.03	Kō Nakahira			
	ハナ肇の一発大冒険	1968.01.03	Yōji Yamada			
	やればやれるぜ 全員集合！！	1968.01.03	Yūsuke Watanabe			
	花の恋人たち	1968.01.03	Buichi Saitō			
	喜劇 初詣列車	1968.01.03	Masaharu Segawa			
	人間魚雷 あゝ回天特別攻撃隊	1968.01.03	Shigehiro Ozawa		WWII	
Bad Reputation's Forte	悪名十八番	1968.01.13	Kazuo Mori		Yakuza	
Sleepy Eyes of Death: Hell is a Woman	眠狂四郎女地獄	1968.01.13	Tokuzō Tanaka		Jidai-geki	
Yukyo Sangokushi: Tekka no Hanamichi	遊侠三国史 鉄火の花道	1968.01.13	Akinori Matsuo			
Outlaw: Gangster VIP	無頼より 大幹部	1968.01.13	Toshio Masuda	Tetsuya Watari, Chieko Matsubara	Yakuza	
Japan's Dark History: Shameful Business	日本暗黒史 情無用	1968.01.14	Eiichi Kudō		Yakuza	
Gambling Den: Presidential Gambling	博奕打ち 総長賭博	1968.01.14	Kōsaku Yamashita		Yakuza	
Devils-in-Law	春らんまん	1968.01.14	Yasuki Chiba	Michiyo Aratama, Yuriko Hoshi, Yoko Tsukasa		
Five Gents and Karate Grandpa	社長繁盛記	1968.01.14	Shue Matsubayashi	Hisaya Morishige, Daisuke Katō, Keiju Kobayashi	Comedy	
	喜劇 夫婦善哉	1968.01.15	Michiyoshi Doi			
	爽春	1968.01.15	Noboru Nakamura			
	ドレイ工場	1968.01.25	武田敦			
Woman Gambler 5	関東女賭博師	1968.01.27	Yoshio Inoue		Yakuza	
Otoko no Shobu: Byakko no Tetsu	男の勝負 白虎の鉄	1968.01.27	Kōsaku Yamashita		Yakuza	
The Secret of the Fylfot	忍びの卍	1968.01.27	Noribumi Suzuki		Jidai-geki / Ninja	
	秘録おんな牢	1968.01.27	Akira Inoue			
Niitakayama Nobore-Nihontekoku no hokai	ニイタカヤマノボレ －日本帝国の崩壊－	1968.01.27		Junnosuke Hiramitsu	Documentary	
	花月良宵 Hong Kong Rhapsody	1968.01.29	Umetsugu Inoue			
	眠れる美女	1968.01.31	Kōzaburō Yoshimura			
Affair in the Snow	樹氷のよろめき	1968.01.31	Yoshishige Yoshida			
	性の配当	1968.02.__	Kaoru Umezawa			
	日本(秘)風俗史 乳房	1968.02.__	Kōe Shindō			
	女体の渇き	1968.02.__	Giichi Nishihara			
	星影の波止場	1968.02.01	Shōgorō Nishimura			
	恋人と呼んでみたい	1968.02.01	Kenjirō Morinaga			
Death by Hanging	絞死刑	1968.02.03	Nagisa Oshima	Fumio Watanabe, Toshiro Ishido, Masao Adachi	Comedy drama	
Gambler's Farewell	博徒解散式	1968.02.09	Kinji Fukasaku		Yakuza	
	陸軍諜報33	1968.02.09	Tsuneo Kobayashi		WWII	
	あるセックス・ドクターの記録	1968.02.10	Tarō Yuge			
	戦後残酷物語	1968.02.10	Tetsuji Takechi			
	男の掟	1968.02.13	Mio Ezaki			
	藤猛物語 ヤマト魂	1968.02.13	Hideo Sekikawa			
	温泉ゲリラ 大笑撃	1968.02.14	Hirokazu Ichimura			
	惚れた強み	1968.02.14	Junzō Mizukawa			
The Luck of Station Front Plaza	喜劇 駅前開運	1968.02.14	Shiro Toyoda	Hisaya Morishige, Junzaburo Ban, Frankie Sakai	Comedy	
A Woman and the Beancurd Soup	女と味噌汁	1968.02.14	Heinosuke Gosho	Junko Ikeuchi, Keizo Kawasaki, Kei Satō	Drama	
	黒部の太陽	1968.02.17	Kei Kumai			
Temple Nuns	尼寺(秘)物語	1968.02.22	Sadao Nakajima		Jidai-geki	
Chilvarous Story of Japan: Broken Sentence	日本侠客伝 絶縁状	1968.02.22	Masahiro Makino		Yakuza	
Woman Gambler 6	女賭博師乗り込む	1968.02.24	Shigeo Tanaka		Yakuza	
The Great Villains	大悪党	1968.02.24	Yasuzō Masumura	Jirô Tamiya, Kei Satô, Mako Midori	Crime	
Five Gents and a Chinese Merchant	続社長繁盛記	1968.02.24	Shue Matsubayashi	Hisaya Morishige, Daisuke Katō, Keiju Kobayashi		
Kuroneko	藪の中の黒猫	1968.02.24	Kaneto Shindo	Kichiemon Nakamura, Nobuko Otowa, Kei Satō	Jidai-geki / Horror	
	強烈な情事	1968.03.__	Kinya Ogawa			
	昂奮	1968.03.__	Toshio Okuwaki			
	色道仁義	1968.03.__	Hideki Miki			
	蒼いフィルム 品さだめ	1968.03.__	Kan Mukai			
	腹貸し女	1968.03.__	Kōji Wakamatsu			
	男の挑戦	1968.03.01	Michiyoshi Doi			
	嵐に立つ	1968.03.01	Kazuo Hase			
	喜劇 競馬必勝法 大穴勝負	1968.03.05	Masaharu Segawa			
Gokudo	極道	1968.03.05	Kōsaku Yamashita		Yakuza	
	ジェットF104脱出せよ	1968.03.09	Mitsuo Murayama			
Nakano Spy School: The War That Broke Out Last Night	陸軍中野学校 開戦前夜	1968.03.09	Akira Inoue			
	ケメ子の唄	1968.03.16	Kōgi Tanaka			
	ミニミニ突撃隊	1968.03.16	Meijirō Umetsu			
The Bamboozlers	カモとねぎ	1968.03.16	Senkichi Taniguchi	Masayuki Mori, Mako Midori, Hisano Yamaoka		
Booted Babe, Busted Boss	100発100中 黄金の眼	1968.03.16	Jun Fukuda	Akira Takarada, Makoto Sato, Bibari Maeda		
	アンデルセン物語	1968.03.19	Kimio Yabuki			
	怪獣王子	1968.03.19	Keinosuke Tsuchiya			
Gamera vs. Viras	ガメラ対宇宙怪獣バイラス	1968.03.20	Noriaki Yuasa		Science fiction	
Yokai Monsters: One Hundred Monsters	妖怪百物語	1968.03.20	Kimiyoshi Yasuda			
Good-bye Moscow	さらばモスクワ愚連隊	1968.03.22	Hiromichi Horikawa	Yūzō Kayama, Toshiko Morita, Masahiko Togashi		
Two Hearts in the Rain	めぐりあい	1968.03.27	Hideo Onchi	Toshio Kurosawa, Wakako Sakai, Ryo Tamura		
	残雪	1968.03.30	Katsumi Nishikawa			
	進め！ジャガーズ 敵前上陸	1968.03.30	Yōichi Maeda			
	青春の風	1968.03.30	Shōgorō Nishimura			
Zoku Otoshimae	続決着	1968.03.30	Teruo Ishii			
Gambling Den: Raid	博奕打ち 殴り込み	1968.03.30	Shigehiro Ozawa		Yakuza	
Three Resurrected Drunkards	帰って来たヨッパライ	1968.03.30	Nagisa Oshima	Kazuhiko Katō, Norihiko Hashida, Osamu Kitayama		
	お産と梅毒	1968.04.__	Kinya Ogawa			
	急所攻め	1968.04.__	Kan Mukai			
	女の手さばき	1968.04.__	Shin Murakami			
	女の秘絵図	1968.04.__	Kōsei Hayasaka			
	情事残酷史	1968.04.__	Osamu Yamashita			
	夫婦交換	1968.04.__	Kaoru Umezawa			
	立体透視映画 異常性犯罪史	1968.04.__	Kōji Seki			
Absolutely Secret: Girl Torture	極秘 女拷問	1968.04.__	Kiyoshi Komori	Naomi Tani	Jidai-geki / Pink	
	とむらい師たち	1968.04.06	Kenji Misumi			
	喜劇 泥棒学校	1968.04.06	Tarō Yuge			
Drifters Desoyo	ドリフターズですよ！ 盗って盗って盗りまくれ	1968.04.10	Yusuke Watanabe	The Drifters		
The World is Waiting for Us	ザ・タイガース 世界はボクらを待っている	1968.04.10	Yoshinori Wada	The Tigers	Comedy	
	夜の手配師	1968.04.11	Shinji Murayama			
	いれずみ無残	1968.04.13	Hideo Sekikawa			
	ネオン太平記	1968.04.13	Tadahiko Isomi			
	みな殺しの霊歌	1968.04.13	Tai Katō			
Front Row Life	かぶりつき人生	1968.04.13	Tatsumi Kumashiro	Hatsue Tonooka		Kumashiro's first film
Gokuchu no Kaoyaku	獄中の顔役	1968.04.19	Yasuo Furuhata			
Daigashi	代貸	1968.04.19	Kiyoshi Saeki			
Lone Wolf	ひとり狼	1968.04.20	Kazuo Ikehiro		Jidai-geki	
	ぼん太の結婚屋 いろいろあらアな田舎ッぺ	1968.04.20	Kōji Chino			
Woman of the Snow	怪談雪女郎	1968.04.20	Tokuzō Tanaka		Jidai-geki	
Zankyo Musho	残侠無情	1968.04.20	Motomu Ida		Yakuza	
	思い出の指輪	1968.04.27	Kōichi Saitō			
	夜明けの二人	1968.04.27	Yoshitarō Nomura			
Mexican Free-for-All	クレージーメキシコ大作戦	1968.04.27	Takashi Tsuboshima	The Crazy Cats, Hajime Hana, Kei Tani		
Thoroughbred	サラブレッド	1968.04.27	Kensuke Nozaki		Documentary	
	赤道を駈ける男	1968.04.28	Buichi Saitō			
Top Gang Members: Villainy	大幹部 無頼	1968.04.28	Keiichi Ozawa		Yakuza	
	お愉しみ	1968.05.__	Osamu Takagi			
	陰乱	1968.05.__	Kan Mukai			
	学生娼婦	1968.05.__	Shōji Shinagawa			
	婚前交情記	1968.05.__	Shinya Yamamoto			
	女の色欲	1968.05.__	Hideki Miki			
	女体開花	1968.05.__	Toshio Okuwaki			
	性の階段	1968.05.__	Giichi Nishihara			
	肉体の契約書	1968.05.__	Mamoru Watanabe			
	猟奇 色情夜話	1968.05.__	Kaoru Umezawa			
	歪んだセックス	1968.05.__	Osamu Yamashita			
	毛の生えた拳銃	1968.05.__	Atsushi Yamatoya			
Woman Gambler 7	女賭博師鉄火場破り	1968.05.01	Yoshio Inoue		Yakuza	
A Past Record	前科者	1968.05.01	Kōsaku Yamashita			
Tokugawa: Women Genealogy	徳川女系図	1968.05.01	Teruo Ishii		Jidai-geki	
Sleepy Eyes of Death: In the Spider's Lair	眠狂四郎人肌蜘蛛	1968.05.01	Kimiyoshi Yasuda		Jidai-geki	
Homeless Ninja Scroll: Lose in All Directions	風来忍法帖 八方破れ	1968.05.08	Tetsuhiro Kawasaki	Kiyoshi Atsumi, Makoto Sato, Juro Sasa	Jidai-geki / Ninja	
Tarekomi	密告	1968.05.14	Masaharu Segawa			
	悪党社員遊侠伝	1968.05.15	Hirokazu Ichimura			
	喜劇爬虫類	1968.05.15	Yūsuke Watanabe			
	ザ・スパイダースの大騒動	1968.05.18	Kenjirō Morinaga			
	講道館破門状	1968.05.18	Akira Inoue			
The Saga of Tanegashima	鉄砲伝来記	1968.05.18	Kazuo Mori		Jidai-geki	
	娘の季節	1968.05.18	Hiromi Higuchi			
	産業スパイ	1968.05.21	Eiichi Kudō			
Yakuza on Horseback	馬賊やくざ	1968.05.21	Shigehiro Ozawa		Yakuza	
Nanami, The Inferno of First Love	初恋 地獄篇	1968.05.25	Susumu Hani			Entered into the 18th Berlin International Film Festival
Hippies of Kawachi	河内フーテン族	1968.05.25	Yasuki Chiba	Frankie Sakai, Hajime Hana, Yumiko Nogawa	Comedy	
Volcano of Station Front Plaza	喜劇 駅前火山	1968.05.25	Tatsuo Yamada	Hisaya Morishige, Frankie Sakai, Junzaburo Ban	Comedy	
	怪談バラバラ幽霊	1968.05.28	Kinya Ogawa			
	わが命の唄 艶歌	1968.05.29	Toshio Masuda			
The Eagle and the Wolf	明治血風録 鷹と狼	1968.05.29	Akinori Matsuo		Jidai-geki	
Cruel Ghost Legend	怪談残酷物語	1968.05.31	Kazuo Hase		Jidai-geki	
	新・いれずみ無残	1968.05.31	Hideo Sekikawa			
	エロチック風土記 替え床	1968.06.__	Kōji Seki			
	刑法177条 婦女脅迫暴行罪	1968.06.__	Masanao Sakao			
	純処女しらべ	1968.06.__	Kinya Ogawa			
	女子学生 極秘日記	1968.06.__	Kōe Shindō			
	情欲の女 あやまち	1968.06.__	Kōe Shindō			
	色気ざかり	1968.06.__	Kensuke Sawa			
	寝わざ師	1968.06.__	Masanao Sakao			
	性獄	1968.06.__	Haruo Matsubara			
	痴漢の季節	1968.06.__	Shinya Yamamoto			
	花と蛇より 肉の飼育	1968.06.__	Haruo Matsubara, Shintarō Kishi			
	肉体の欲求	1968.06.__	Kōji Wakamatsu			
	熱い犯行	1968.06.__	Hajime Sasaki			
	白い快感	1968.06.__	Seiichi Fukuda			
	裸女地獄	1968.06.__	Kiyoshi Komori			
	これがベトナム戦争だ！	1968.06.01	Shinkichi Noda			
	あゝ予科練	1968.06.01	Shinji Murayama		WWII	
	燃えつきた地図	1968.06.01	Hiroshi Teshigahara			
	セックス・チェック 第二の性	1968.06.01	Yasuzō Masumura			
Hymn to a Tired Man	日本の青春	1968.06.08	Masaki Kobayashi	Makoto Fujita, Michiyo Aratama, Toshio Kurosawa	Drama	
Judge and Jeopardy	首	1968.06.08	Shiro Moritani	Keiju Kobayashi, Yoko Minarnikaze, Keiji Furuyama	Drama	
	プロレス・W・リーグ 血ぬれた王者	1968.06.15	Yukio Noda			
	北海道物語	1968.06.15	杉原文治			
	こわしや甚六	1968.06.15	Hirokazu Ichimura			
Ghost Story of Peonies and Stone Lanterns	牡丹燈籠	1968.06.15	Satsuo Yamamoto		Jidai-geki	
	怪談おとし穴	1968.06.15	Kōji Shima			
The Drifting Avenger	荒野の渡世人	1968.06.15	Junya Satō			
	吹けば飛ぶよな男だが	1968.06.15	Yōji Yamada			
	西ヨーロッパの守り	1968.06.22	旦生正/宇川清隆			
Stormy Era	昭和のいのち	1968.06.22	Toshio Masuda			
How to be the Worst of Office Workers	サラリーマン悪党術	1968.06.22	Eizo Sugawa	Shoichi Ozawa, Reiko Dan, Toshio Kurosawa	Comedy	
Kill!	斬る	1968.06.22	Kihachi Okamoto	Tatsuya Nakadai, Etsushi Takahashi, Atsuo Nakamura	Jidai-geki / Chambara	
	温泉あんま芸者	1968.06.28	Teruo Ishii			
Return of Gokudo	帰ってきた極道	1968.06.28	Kōsaku Yamashita		Yakuza	
	愛の三分間指圧	1968.06.29	Tarō Yuge			
The Time of Reckoning	不信のとき	1968.06.29	Tadashi Imai	Ayako Wakao, Jirô Tamiya, Mariko Okada, Mariko Kaga	Drama	
	わが闘争	1968.06.30	Noboru Nakamura			
	強虫女と弱虫男	1968.06.30	Kaneto Shindō			
	0の陰獣 日本性犯罪史	1968.07.__	早坂絋			
	口説 あの手この手	1968.07.__	Shōji Shinagawa			
	ある妊婦	1968.07.__	Osamu Yamashita			
	女体の泥沼	1968.07.__	Katsuhito Mukoyama			
	真昼の抱擁	1968.07.__	Kan Kataoka			
	性の異色体験	1968.07.__	橘明			
	いろごと 秘中の秘	1968.07.__	Kōe Shindō			
	変態処女	1968.07.__	Shinya Yamamoto			
	暴行少女日記 ♀（メス）	1968.07.__	Kan Mukai			
	暴行犯	1968.07.__	Shinya Yamamoto			
	女浮世風呂	1968.07.10	Motomu Ida			
	艶説 明治邪教伝	1968.07.10	Michiyoshi Doi			
Ghost Cat of the Cursed Swamp	怪猫呪いの沼	1968.07.12	Yoshihiro Ishikawa		Jidai-geki	
Snake Woman's Curse	怪談 蛇女	1968.07.12	Nobuo Nakagawa	Seizaburo Kawazu, Yukie Kagawa, Shingo Yamashiro	Horror	
Hiroku Onna Gura	秘録おんな蔵	1968.07.13	Kazuo Mori		Jidai-geki	
The Green Years	年ごろ	1968.07.13	Masanobu Deme	Yoko Naito, Toshio Kurosawa, Masumi Okada	Drama	
Young Guy in Rio	リオの若大将	1968.07.13	Katsumi Iwauchi	Yūzō Kayama, Yuriko Hoshi, Mie Nakao		
Hoodlum Priest and the Gold Mint	続やくざ坊主	1968.07.13	Kazuoi Ikehiro	Shintaro Katsu, Yukiji Asaoka, Kayo Matsuo	Jidai-geki	
	天使の誘惑	1968.07.20	Kōgi Tanaka			
	虹の中のレモン	1968.07.20	Kōichi Saitō			
	ゲゲゲの鬼太郎	1968.07.21	Hiroshi Shidara			
	魔法使いサリー	1968.07.21	Hiroshi Shidara			
	ウルトラセブン	1968.07.21	Hajime Tsuburaya			
The Great Adventure of Horus, Prince of the Sun	太陽の王子 ホルスの大冒険	1968.07.21	Isao Takahata		Anime Fantasy adventure	
	ある女子高校医の記録 妊娠	1968.07.27	Tarō Yuge			
Woman Gambler 8	女賭博師尼寺開帳	1968.07.27	Shigeo Tanaka		Yakuza	
	ひもつき処女	1968.08.__	Masanao Sakao			
	引裂かれた処女	1968.08.__	Giichi Nishihara			
	好色魔	1968.08.__	Akitaka Kimata			
	女と男の味くらべ	1968.08.__	Takeo Takagi			
	女のうれし泣き	1968.08.__	Ario Takeda			
	色道一代 女の壺ぶり	1968.08.__	Kaoru Umezawa			
	女子学生 性の迷路	1968.08.__	Kinya Ogawa			
	人生四十八手 裏表	1968.08.__	Kaoru Umezawa			
	凄絶 四所斬り	1968.08.__	Kiyoshi Komori			
	新宿フーテン族 性のハレンチ	1968.08.__	NISHIMURA Reo			
	崩れた官能	1968.08.__	安芸敬三			
	未亡人責め	1968.08.__	Osamu Yamashita			
	性地帯 セックスゾーン	1968.08.__	Masao Adachi			
	海ひこ山ひこ	1968.08.01	Kazuhiko Watanabe			
Histories of the Chivalrous	侠客列伝	1968.08.01	Masahiro Makino		Yakuza	
	盛り場ブルース	1968.08.01	Michio Konishi			
Villainy: No Mercy	無頼非情	1968.08.01	Mio Ezaki		Yakuza	
Duel in the Storm	嵐の果し状	1968.08.01	Akinori Matsuo			
Destroy All Monsters	怪獣総進撃	1968.08.01	Ishirō Honda	Akira Kubo, Jun Tazaki, Yoshio Tsuchiya	Science fiction / Horror	
	日本ゲリラ時代	1968.08.03	Yūsuke Watanabe			
	昭和元禄ハレンチ節	1968.08.03	Hirokazu Ichimura, Toshirō Hasebe			
Yami o Kiku Ippatsu	闇を裂く一発	1968.08.10	Tetsutarō Murano			
Zatoichi and the Fugitives	座頭市果し状	1968.08.10	Kimiyoshi Yasuda	Shintaro Katsu, Takashi Shimura, Kayao Mikimoto	Jidai-geki / Chambara	
	ある色魔の告白 色欲の果て	1968.08.14	Mio Ezaki			
Wicked Priest	極悪坊主	1968.08.14	Kiyoshi Saeki		Yakuza	
Gambling Den of Fresh Blood	鮮血の賭場	1968.08.14	Takashi Nomura			
Uragiri no Ankokugai	裏切りの暗黒街	1968.08.14	Yasuo Furuhata			
Admiral Yamamoto	連合艦隊指令長官 山本五十六	1968.08.14	Seiji Maruyama	Toshiro Mifune, Yūzō Kayama, Toshio Kurosawa	WWII	
Black Lizard	黒蜥蝪	1968.08.14	Kinji Fukasaku	Akihiro Maruyama, Isao Kimura, Keiko Matsuoka	Crime, thriller	
Goke, Body Snatcher from Hell	吸血鬼ゴケミドロ	1968.08.14	Hajime Sato	Teruo Yoshida, Tomomi Sato, Hideo Ko	Science fiction / Horror	
Imaginary Paradise	空想天国	1968.08.14	Takeshi Matsumori	Kei Tani, Wakako Sakai, Akira Takarada	Comedy-fantasy	
Kanto Woman Yakuza	関東女やくざ	1968.08.24	Akira Inoue		Yakuza	
Two Bodyguards	二匹の用心棒	1968.08.24	Kenji Misumi		Jidai-geki	
	(秘)トルコ風呂	1968.08.27	Shinji Murayama			
Honor Among Brothers 7	兄弟仁義 逆縁の盃	1968.08.27	Noribumi Suzuki		Yakuza	
	ザ・スパイダースのバリ島珍道中	1968.08.28	Katsumi Nishikawa			
	だれの椅子？	1968.08.28	Kenjirō Morinaga			
	実話レポート アベック旅情	1968.09.__	Shinya Yamamoto			
	セックス女優残酷史	1968.09.__	Kan Mukai			
	ヒモと鎖	1968.09.__	Kiyoshi Funada			
	女責め たらい廻し	1968.09.__	Osamu Yamashita			
	情痴のしげみ	1968.09.__	Kinya Ogawa			
	色くるい	1968.09.__	Kensuke Sawa			
	色情診断	1968.09.__	Kan Kataoka			
	寝みだれ妻	1968.09.__	Shinya Yamamoto			
	性の裏表	1968.09.__	Yūsuke Uchida			
	赤い快楽	1968.09.__	Hajime Sasaki			
	舌なめずり	1968.09.__	早坂絋			
	透明人間 エロ博士	1968.09.__	Kōji Seki			
	日本性風俗史 無理心中	1968.09.__	Kan Mukai			
	不倫のたのしみ	1968.09.__	Hajime Sasaki			
	変態妻	1968.09.__	都築葉之助			
The Cheater	いかさま博奕	1968.09.03	Shigehiro Ozawa			
	釧路の夜	1968.09.04	Umetsugu Inoue			
	新宿育ち	1968.09.04	Kazuo Hase			
	喜劇 競馬必勝法 一発勝負	1968.09.06	Masaharu Segawa			
	フリーセックス 十代の青い性	1968.09.07	Yoshio Inoue			
Call of the Mountain	北穂高絶唱	1968.09.07	Tadashi Sawashima	Kinya Kitaoji, Yuriko Hoshi, Kunie Tanaka	Romantic melodrama	
My Brother, My Love	兄貴の恋人	1968.09.07	Shiro Moritani	Yūzō Kayama, Yoko Naito, Wakako Sakai		
Ukiyo-e Cruel Story	浮世絵残酷物語	1968.09.07	Tetsuji Takechi	Noriko Tatsumi	Pink	
	ある少女の告白 禁断の果実	1968.09.10	Noboru Kaji			
Red Peony Gambler	緋牡丹博徒	1968.09.14	Kōsaku Yamashita		Yakuza	
	初恋宣言	1968.09.15	Meijirō Umetsu			
	小さなスナック	1968.09.15	Kōichi Saitō			
	復讐の歌が聞える	1968.09.17	貞永高久/山根成之			
Gokudo Soldier	兵隊極道	1968.09.18	Kiyoshi Saeki		Yakuza	
	第50回全国高校野球選手権大会 青春	1968.09.21	Kon Ichikawa [Overall Direction]			
	あゝひめゆりの塔	1968.09.21	Toshio Masuda			
	孤島の太陽	1968.09.21	Kenji Yoshida			
	高校生芸者	1968.09.21	Tarō Yuge			
Woman Gambler 9	女賭博師絶縁状	1968.09.21	Shigeo Tanaka		Yakuza	
Adventure, Adventure	ドリフターズですよ！ 冒険冒険また冒険	1968.09.21	Yoshinori Wada	The Drifters		
	金瓶梅	1968.09.27	Kōji Wakamatsu			
Shogun's Joys of Torture	徳川女刑罰史	1968.09.28	Teruo Ishii	Yuki Kagawa	Jidai-geki / Ero guro	
	創世紀	1968.10.__	池内辰夫			
	お座敷四十八態	1968.10.__	Shinya Yamamoto			
	セックスドライブ	1968.10.__	Shōji Shinagawa			
	セックスの神秘	1968.10.__	Osamu Yamashita			
	穴地獄	1968.10.__	Kaoru Umezawa			
Modern Female Ninja: Flesh Hell	現代くノ一肉地獄	1968.10.__	Kan Mukai		Gendai-geki / Ninja	
	処女解禁	1968.10.__	都築葉之助			
	初夜が憎い	1968.10.__	Takashi Chiba			
	女のたこ部屋	1968.10.__	Ario Takeda			
	生理と妊娠	1968.10.__	Kinya Ogawa			
	続・肉体女優日記	1968.10.__	Hajime Sasaki			
	夜の寄生虫	1968.10.__	Kensuke Sawa			
Delinquent Boss	不良番長	1968.10.01	Yukio Noda		Yakuza	
	まっぴら社員遊侠伝	1968.10.05	Toshirō Hasebe			
	東シナ海	1968.10.05	Tadahiko Isomi			
Ama Kuzure	尼くずれ	1968.10.05	Kazuo Ikehiro			
Yakuza Soldier: Thievery	兵隊やくざ 強奪	1968.10.05	Tokuzō Tanaka		Yakuza	
Retaliation	縄張はもらった	1968.10.05	Yasuharu Hasebe	Akira Kobayashi, Joe Shishido, Hideaki Nitani	Yakuza	
Young Challengers	若者よ挑戦せよ	1968.10.05	Yasuki Chiba	Keiju Kobayashi, Toshio Kurosawa, Mitsuko Mori		
Gorotsuki	ごろつき	1968.10.12	Masahiro Makino			
	街に泉があった	1968.10.12	Masao Asano			
	女めくら 花と牙	1968.10.12	Hirokazu Ichimura			
	日本解放戦線 三里塚の夏	1968.10.12	Shinsuke Ogawa			
Legends of the Poisonous Seductress: Female Demon Ohyaku	妖艶毒婦伝 般若のお百	1968.10.12	Yoshihiro Ishikawa		Jidai-geki	
	九尾の狐と飛丸	1968.10.19	Shinichi Yagi			
	日本人ここに在り	1968.10.19	島内利男/清水進			
Three Scoundrels	三匹の悪党	1968.10.19	Akinori Matsuo		Yakuza	
	秘帳 女浮世草紙	1968.10.19	Motomu Ida			
	肉弾	1968.10.22	Kihachi Okamoto			
	砂の香り	1968.10.23	Katsuki Iwauchi			
	昭和元禄 TOKYO196X年	1968.10.23	Hideo Onchi			
Theater of Life: Hishakaku and Kiratsune	人生劇場 飛車角と吉良常	1968.10.25	Tomu Uchida		Yakuza	
	夜の歌謡シリーズ 命かれても	1968.10.25	Ryūichi Takamori			
	白昼堂々	1968.10.26	Yoshitarō Nomura			
Blackmail Is My Life	恐喝こそわが人生	1968.10.26	Kinji Fukasaku	Hiroki Matsukata	Crime	
	ある女子高校医の記録 初体験	1968.10.30	Michihiko Obimori			
	積木の箱	1968.10.30	Yasuzō Masumura			
	トルコ風呂 夜ごとの情熱	1968.11.__	Kinya Ogawa			
	異常暴行魔	1968.11.__	Toshio Okuwaki			
	飢えた獣欲	1968.11.__	Kaoru Umezawa			
	穴をねらえ！	1968.11.__	Kōe Shindō			
	好色マンション(秘)室	1968.11.__	Kinya Ogawa			
	失神のテクニック ハレンチレポート	1968.11.__	三魔瑛介			
	女色のもつれ	1968.11.__	Masanao Sakao			
	色獄道	1968.11.__	Kiyoshi Komori			
	性の暴力	1968.11.__	Toshio Okuwaki			
	肉の競艶	1968.11.__	Haruo Matsubara			
	肉責め	1968.11.__	Kaoru Umezawa			
	日本性犯罪史 白昼の暴行鬼	1968.11.__	Masanao Sakao			
	乳房の密猟	1968.11.__	Kensuke Sawa			
	不貞妻	1968.11.__	Kan Mukai			
	セックス人間	1968.11.__	Kōji Seki			
	女医残酷日記	1968.11.__	Kan Mukai			
	BG・ある19才の日記 あげてよかった！	1968.11.02	丹野雄二			
	コント55号 世紀の大弱点	1968.11.02	Yoshinori Wada			
Yokogami Yaburi no Zenkamono	横紙破りの前科者	1968.11.02	Shigehiro Ozawa			
	日本一の裏切り男	1968.11.02	Eizō Sugawa			
Villainy: Killer Goro	無頼 人斬り五郎	1968.11.02	Keiichi Ozawa		Yakuza	
	喜劇"夫"売ります！！	1968.11.09	Masaharu Segawa			
Genocide	昆虫大戦争	1968.11.09	Kazui Nihonmatsu	Keisuke Sonoi, Yusuke Kawazu, Emi Shindo	Science fiction	
The Living Skeleton	吸血髑髏船	1968.11.09	Hiroshi Matsuno	Kikko Matsuoka, Yasunori Irikawa, Masumi Okada	Horror	
Woman Gambler 10	女賭博師奥ノ院開帳	1968.11.16	Yoshio Inoue		Yakuza	
	続・秘録おんな牢	1968.11.16	Kimiyoshi Yasuda			
Vanity of the Shogun's Mistresses	大奥絵巻	1968.11.16	Kōsaku Yamashita		Jidai-geki	
Red Peony Gambler: Gambler's Obligation	緋牡丹博徒 一宿一飯	1968.11.22	Noribumi Suzuki		Yakuza	
	魔性の女	1968.11.22	Nozomu Yanase			
The Profound Desire of the Gods	神々の深き欲望	1968.11.22	Shōhei Imamura	Rentarō Mikuni	Comedy drama	
The Day the Sun Rose	祇園祭	1968.11.23	Tetsuya Yamanouchi		Jidai-geki	
	狙撃	1968.11.23	Hiromichi Horikawa			
	スクラップ集団	1968.11.24	Tomotaka Tasaka			
	極道社員遊侠伝	1968.11.24	Toshirō Hasebe			
Wicked Priest: Killer's Counting Song	極悪坊主 人斬り数え唄	1968.11.30	Takashi Harada		Yakuza	
	続セックス・ドクターの記録	1968.11.30	Tarō Yuge			
	濡れた二人	1968.11.30	Yasuzō Masumura			
	みだら妻 外道情炎	1968.12.__	Kan Mukai			
	甘い初夜	1968.12.__	Toshio Okuwaki			
	亀裂	1968.12.__	Akitaka Kimata			
	血の暴行	1968.12.__	Kaoru Umezawa			
	孤島のうめき	1968.12.__	Kōji Seki			
	告白	1968.12.__	大沼寛			
	残忍(秘)女責め	1968.12.__	Kaoru Umezawa			
	処女の弱点	1968.12.__	Kan Kataoka			
	女子学生残酷白書 真赤なうぶげ	1968.12.__	Mamoru Watanabe			
	性の悪態	1968.12.__	北見一郎			
	続・女郎妻	1968.12.__	橋本忠典			
	続・肉	1968.12.__	Kan Mukai			
	多角関係	1968.12.__	Kinya Ogawa			
	肉のほころび	1968.12.__	Jirō Komoro			
	妊婦分娩中絶	1968.12.__	Shinya Yamamoto			
	分娩 異色性風俗史	1968.12.__	Kōe Shindō			
	欲情のうずまき	1968.12.__	Kinya Ogawa			
	裸色殺法 ぬき身	1968.12.__	Kiyoshi Komori			
	裏切の色事	1968.12.__	Giichi Nishihara			
	穴じかけ	1968.12.__	Hajime Sasaki			
	夜の歌謡シリーズ 伊勢佐木町ブルース	1968.12.07	Shinji Murayama			
Hot Vacation	お熱い休暇	1968.12.07	Mitsunobu Hirayama	Norihei Miki, Kitsuko Matsuoka, Toki Shirozawa	Comedy	
Time for Undutiful Children	にっぽん親不孝時代	1968.12.07	Kunihiko Yamamoto	The Spiders		
	ある少女の告白 純潔	1968.12.14	Kenjirō Morinaga			
	蛇娘と白髪魔	1968.12.14	Noriaki Yuasa			
	新宿の肌	1968.12.14	Kazuhiko Saimura			
	霧にむせぶ夜	1968.12.14	Meijirō Umetsu			
Blazing Continent	燃える大陸	1968.12.14	Shōgorō Nishimura	Tetsuya Watari, Chieko Matsubara, Masumi Okada		
Yokai Monsters: Spook Warfare	妖怪大戦争	1968.12.14	Kuroda Yoshiyuki			
	ザ・タイガース 華やかなる招待	1968.12.19	山本邦彦			
	河童の三平 妖怪作戦	1968.12.19	Hidetoshi Kitamura			
	燃えろ！青春	1968.12.19	Takeshi Matsumori			
The Green Slime	ガンマー第3号 宇宙大作戦	1968.12.19	Kinji Fukasaku	Robert Horton, Luciana Paluzzi, Richard Jaeckel	Science fiction	American-Japanese co-production
	諜海花 The Brain-Stealers	1968.12.20	Umetsugu Inoue			
	コント55号と水前寺清子の神様の恋人	1968.12.28	Yoshitarō Nomura			
	喜劇 大安旅行	1968.12.28	Masaharu Segawa			
Woman Gambler 11	女賭博師みだれ壺	1968.12.28	Shigeo Tanaka		Yakuza	
New Abashiri Prison Story	新網走番外地	1968.12.28	Masahiro Makino		Yakuza	
Notorious Gambler	博徒列伝	1968.12.28	Shigehiro Ozawa		Yakuza	
	忘れるものか	1968.12.28	Akinori Matsuo			
Villainy: Black Sword	無頼 黒匕首	1968.12.28	Keiichi Ozawa		Yakuza	
Samaritan Zatoichi	座頭市喧嘩太鼓	1968.12.28	Kenji Misumi	Shintaro Katsu, Yoshiko Mita, Makoto Sato	Jidai-geki / Chambara	
	人のくらし百万年 マニ・マニ・マーチ	1968.12.29	Taiji Yabushita			
	さらば夏の光	1968.12.31	Yoshishige Yoshida			

== See also ==
- 1968 in Japan
- 1968 in Japanese television
