= 1967 in science fiction =

The year 1967 was marked, in science fiction, by the following:

== Events ==
The 25th annual Worldcon, Nycon 3, was held in New York City, USA

== Births and deaths ==
=== Births ===
- Ted Chiang
- Denis Villeneuve
- Lilly Wachowski

=== Deaths ===
- Hugo Gernsback

== Literary releases ==
=== Novels ===
- Counter-Clock World, by Philip K. Dick
- The Hole in the Zero, by M. K. Joseph
- Lord of Light, by Roger Zelazny

=== Children's books ===
- The White Mountains, the first book in The Tripods series by John Christopher

=== Short Stories ===
- Dangerous Visions (anthology), ed. by Harlan Ellison
- "I Have No Mouth, and I Must Scream", by Harlan Ellison

=== Comics ===
- Genma Wars, by Kazumasa Hirai and Shotaro Ishinomori, begins serialization in Weekly Shōnen Magazine
- The first Valérian story appeared in Pilote magazine

== Movies ==
- Chand Par Chadayee, dir. by T. P. Sundaram
- His Name Was Robert, dir. by Ilya Olshvanger
- Privilege, dir. by Peter Watkins
- The X From Outer Space, dir. by Kazui Nihonmatsu

== Television ==
- Captain Scarlet and the Mysterons
- The Invaders
- The Prisoner

== Awards ==
=== Hugos ===
- Best novel: The Moon is a Harsh Mistress, by Robert A. Heinlein
- Best novelette: "The Last Castle", by Jack Vance
- Best short story: "Neutron Star", by Larry Niven
- Best dramatic presentation: Star Trek — "The Menagerie", dir. by Marc Daniels, written by Gene Roddenberry
- Best professional magazine: If, ed. by Frederik Pohl
- Best professional artist: Jack Gaughan
- Best fanzine: Niekas, ed. by Edmund R. Meskys and Felice Rolfe
- Best fan writer: Alexei Panshin
- Best fan artist: Jack Gaughan

=== Nebulas ===
- Best novel: The Einstein Intersection, by Samuel R. Delany
- Best novella: Behold the Man, by Michael Moorcock
- Best novelette: "Gonna Roll the Bones", by Fritz Lieber
- Best short story: "Aye, and Gomorrah...", by Samuel R. Delany
