= List of horror films of 1968 =

A list of horror films released in 1968.

Horror films released in 1968
| Title | Director | Cast | Country | Notes |
|---|---|---|---|---|
| Any Body...Any Way (a.k.a. Behind Locked Doors) | Charles Romine | Joyce Denner, Eve Reeves, Daniel Garth | United States | |
| The Astro-Zombies | Ted V. Mikels | John Carradine, Wendell Corey, Tura Satana | United States | |
| The Blood Beast Terror | Vernon Sewell | Peter Cushing | United Kingdom | |
| Corruption | Robert Hartford-Davis | Peter Cushing, Sue Lloyd, Noel Trevarthen | United Kingdom | |
| Curse of the Crimson Altar (USA title: The Crimson Cult) | Vernon Sewell | Boris Karloff, Christopher Lee, Barbara Steele | United Kingdom | |
| The Devil Rides Out (USA title: The Devil's Bride) | Terence Fisher | Christopher Lee, Charles Gray | United Kingdom | |
| Dracula Has Risen from the Grave | Freddie Francis | Christopher Lee, Rupert Davies, Veronica Carlson | United Kingdom | |
| Fear Chamber | Juan Ibáñez, Jack Hill | Boris Karloff, Julissa, Carlos East, Isela Vega, Yerye Beirute, Santanón | Mexico | |
| Genocide | Kazui Nihonmatsu | Keisuke Sonoi, Yusuke Kawazu, Emi Shindo | Japan | |
| The Ghastly Ones | Andy Milligan | Veronica Radburn, Maggie Rogers, Hal Borske | United States | |
| Goke, Body Snatcher from Hell | Hajime Sato | Kathy Horan, Hideo Ko, Tomomi Sato | Japan | |
| The Green Slime | Kinji Fukasaku | Robert Horton, Luciana Paluzzi, Richard Jaeckel | United States; Japan | |
| Hour of the Wolf | Ingmar Bergman | Max von Sydow, Liv Ullmann, Gertrud Fridh | Sweden | |
| House of Evil | Juan Ibáñez, Jack Hill | Boris Karloff, Julissa, Andrés García | Mexico | |
| The Joy of Torture | Teruo Ishii | | Japan | |
| Kuroneko | Kaneto Shindo | Kichiemon Nakamura, Nobuko Otowa, Kiwako Taichi | Japan | |
| The Living Skeleton | Hiroshi Matsuno | Kikko Matsuoka, Yasunori Irikawa, Masumi Okada | Japan | |
| The Mad Doctor of Blood Island | Eddie Romero | John Ashley, Angelique Pettyjohn, Ronald Remy | United States; Philippines | |
| Mantis in Lace | William Rostler | Susan Stewart, Steve Vincent, M. K. Evans | United States | |
| The Mark of the Werewolf | Enrique López Eguiluz | Paul Naschy | Spain | |
| Night of the Living Dead | George A. Romero | Duane Jones, Judith O'Dea, Karl Hardman | United States | |
| Nights of the Werewolf | René Govar | Paul Naschy, Peter Beaumont, Monique Brainville | Spain; France | |
| Rape of the Vampire | Jean Rollin | Solange Pradel, Bernard Letrou, Ursula Pauly | France | |
| Rosemary's Baby | Roman Polanski | Mia Farrow, John Cassavetes, Ruth Gordon | United States | |
| Satanik | Piero Vivarelli | Magda Konopka, Julio Pena, Armando Calvo | Italy; Spain | |
| Secret Ceremony | Joseph Losey | Elizabeth Taylor, Mia Farrow, Robert Mitchum | United Kingdom | |
| Snake Woman's Curse | Nobuo Nakagawa | Seizaburo Kawazu, Yukie Kagawa, Sachiko Kuwahara | Japan | |
| Snow Ghost | Tokuzo Tanaka | Shino Fujimura, Akira Ishihama, Machiko Hasegawa | Japan | |
| Spider Baby | Jack Hill | Carol Ohmart, Mantan Moreland, Quinn K. Redeker | United States | |
| Spirits of the Dead | Federico Fellini, Louis Malle, Roger Vadim | Jane Fonda, Terence Stamp, Brigitte Bardot | France; Italy | |
| The Strange World of Coffin Joe | José Mojica Marins | José Mojica Marins | Brazil | |
| Succubus | Jesús Franco | Janine Reynaud, Jack Taylor, Howard Vernon | West Germany; Spain | |
| A Tale of Peonies and Lanterns | Satsuo Yamamoto | Kojiro Hongo, Miyoko Akaza, Michiko Otsuka | Japan | |
| Trilogy of Terror | Jose Mojica Marins, Ozualdo Candeias, Luiz Sergio Person | Vany Miller, Lucy Rangel, Lima Duarte | Brazil | |
| Twisted Nerve | Roy Boulting | Hywel Bennett, Hayley Mills, Billie Whitelaw | United Kingdom | |
| Witchfinder General (USA title: The Conqueror Worm) | Michael Reeves | Vincent Price, Ian Ogilvy, Hilary Dwyer | United Kingdom | |

== Citations ==
- Browning, John Edgar (2010). Dracula in Visual Media: Film, Television, Comic Book and Electronic Game Appearances, 1921–2010. McFarland. ISBN 978-0-7864-3365-0.
- Galbraith IV, Stuart (1996). The Japanese Filmography: 1900 through 1994. McFarland. ISBN 0-7864-0032-3.
- Hardy, Phil, ed. (1995). The Overlook Film Encyclopedia. Vol. 3. Overlook Press. ISBN 0-87951-624-0.
- Krafsur, Richard P., ed. (1997). The American Film Institute Catalog of Motion Pictures Produced in the United States: Feature Films, 1961–1970, Part 2. University of California Press. ISBN 0-520-20970-2.
- Mira, Alberto (2005). The Cinema of Spain and Portugal. Wallflower Press. ISBN 1-904764-44-4.
- Waddell, Calum (2009). Jack Hill: the exploitation and blaxploitation master, film by film. McFarland. ISBN 978-0-7864-3609-5.
- Young, R. G. (2000). The Encyclopedia of Fantastic Film: Ali Baba to Zombies. Hal Leonard Corporation. ISBN 1-55783-269-2.
