= The Living Skeleton =

- Theatrical release poster
- Directed by: Hiroshi Matsuno
- Written by: Kikuma Shimoiizaka; Kyūzō Kobayashi
- Produced by: Akira Inomata
- Starring: Kikko Matsuoka; Yasunori Irikawa; Masumi Okada; Nobuo Kaneko; Kō Nishimura
- Cinematography: Masayuki Katō
- Edited by: Kazuo Ōta
- Music by: Noboru Nishiyama
- Production company: Shochiku
- Release date: November 9, 1968 (Japan)
- Running time: 80 minutes
- Country: Japan
- Language: Japanese

The Living Skeleton (吸血髑髏船, Kyūketsu Dokurosen) is a 1968 Japanese horror film directed by Hiroshi Matsuno.

== Plot ==
The film begins in the past where a gang of pirates commandeer a ship and kill everyone on board. Three years later in a seaside village, a Catholic priest (Masumi Okada) has offered shelter to Saeko (Kikko Matsuoka) as her twin sister, Yoriko (also Matsuoka) has disappeared with her new husband at sea. Saeko later scuba dives with her boyfriend, the couple find a group of submerged human skeletons, chained together at the ankles near the ocean floor. That night, a ghost ship appears in the mist offshore as a voice from the ship calls out for Saeko.

== Cast ==
- Kikko Matsuoka as Saeko / Yoriko
- Yasunori Irikawa as Mochizuki
- Masumi Okada as Father Akashi / Tanuma
- Asao Uchida as Ejiri
- Asao Koike as Tsuji
- Toshihiko Yamamoto as Ono
- Keijiro Kikyo as Policeman
- Kaori Taniguchi as Mayumi
- Keiko Yanagawa as Sanae Suetsugu
- Nobuo Kaneko as Suetsugu
- Kô Nishimura as Dr. Nishizato
- Kaishu Uchida as Uchida
- Minoru Hirano as Colleague
- Hitoshi Takagi as Cargo Ship Sailor #1
- Kazuo Mayumida as Cargo Ship Sailor #2
- Michiko Takebe as Cargo Ship Sailor #3

== Production ==
Director Hiroshi Matsuno began working at the film production company Shochiku in 1950 and worked as an assistant director for filmmakers such as Daisuke Itō, Mikio Naruse, and Yoshitarō Nomura. Matsuno directed a few films starring Bunta Sugawara in the early sixties before working on The Living Skeleton. The Living Skeleton was co-written by Kikuma Shimoiizaka, a prolific mystery novelist in Japan.

== Release ==
The Living Skeleton was released on November 9, 1968 in Japan. It was released as a double feature with Genocide.

It was released on DVD by the Criterion Collection in a box set on November 20, 2012. The other films in the box set included The X from Outer Space, Goké, Body Snatcher from Hell, and Genocide.

== Reception ==
Slant Magazine referred to The Living Skeleton as "representing the peak of Shochiku's dalliance with horror convention" and a "chilling and genuinely unnerving black-and-white update of the bygone kaidan tradition". The Austin Chronicle referred to the film as "probably the most conventional of Schochiku's [sic] horror releases"

Professor Wheeler Winston Dixon of the University of Nebraska–Lincoln referred to the Criterion Collection's Eclipse set, calling the film "the most accomplished and sophisticated of the quartet in terms of its visual structure and narrative" and along with Genocide, "easily the most interesting entries".

== See also ==
- List of horror films of 1968
- List of Japanese films of 1968
