= Shochiku =

Japanese entertainment company

Shochiku Co., Ltd.

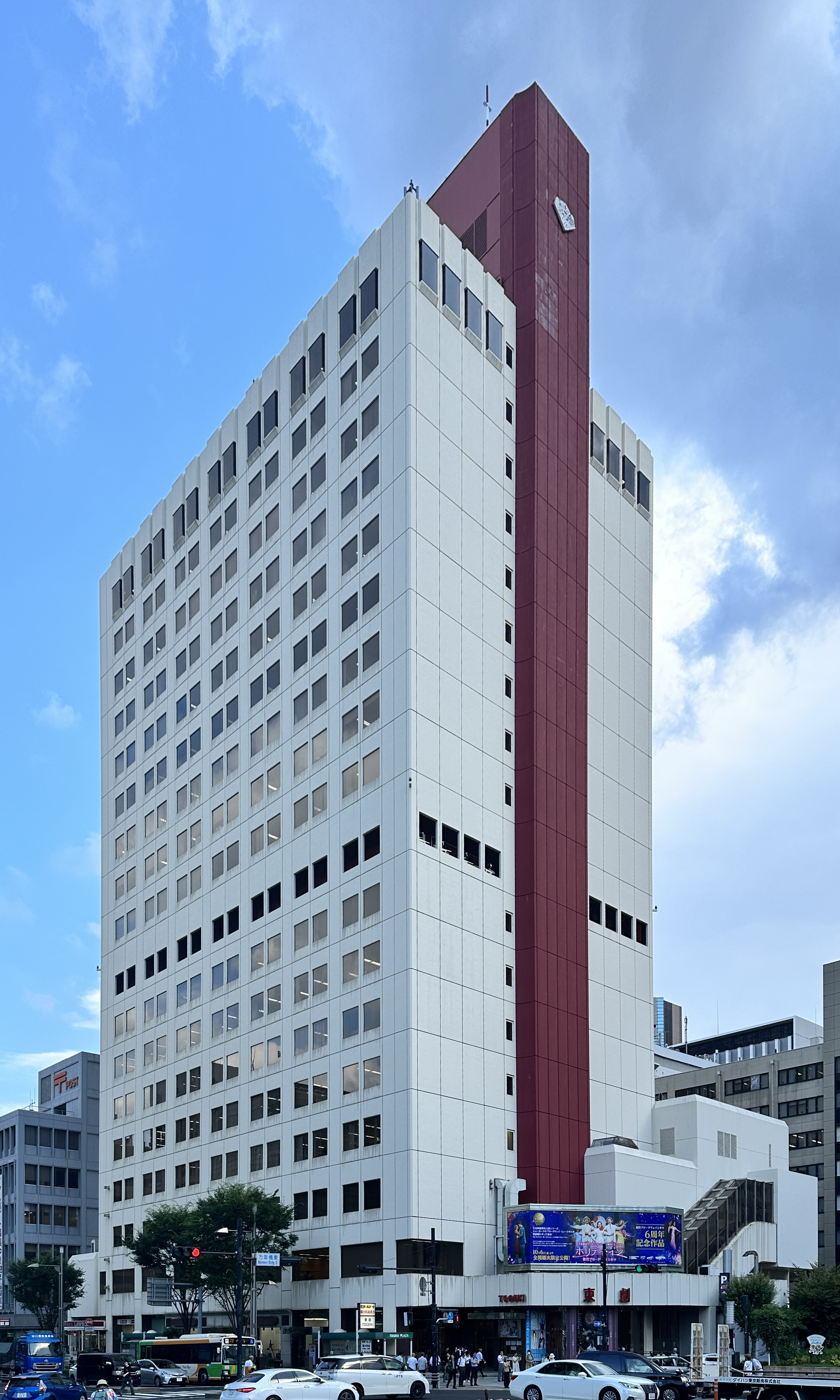
- Headquarters in Tsukiji, Chūō, Tokyo
- Native name: 松竹株式会社
- Romanized name: Shōchiku Kabushiki gaisha
- Formerly: Teikoku Katsudo Shashin Co., Ltd. (1920-1921); Shochiku Kinema Co., Ltd. (1921-1937)
- Type: Public (Kabushiki gaisha)
- Traded as: TYO: 9601; FSE: 9601
- Industry: Entertainment (film)
- Predecessor: Shochiku Kinema Gomei-sha
- Founded: 1895; 131 years ago (brand); November 8, 1920; 106 years ago (company)
- Founders: Takejirō Ōtani; Matsujirō Shirai
- Headquarters: Tsukiji 4-1-1, Chūō, Tokyo, Japan
- Revenue: 5.4 billion yen (2021)
- Number of employees: 1,427 (2021)
- Subsidiaries: Shochiku Geino; Shochiku Entertainment; Shochiku Studio; Shochiku Multiplex Theatres; Shochiku Broadcasting; Shochiku Music Publishing; Shochiku Costume; Shochiku Video Center; Shochiku Navi; Shochiku Service Network; Shochiku Show Biz Studio
- Website: www.shochiku.co.jp www.shochiku.co.jp/global/en/

Shochiku Co., Ltd. (Japanese: 松竹株式会社, Hepburn: Shōchiku Kabushiki gaisha) is a Japanese entertainment company. Founded in 1895, it initially managed kabuki theaters in Kyoto; in 1914, it also acquired ownership of the Kabuki-za theater in Tokyo. In 1920, Shochiku entered the film production industry and established the Kamata Film Studio. Currently, it is considered one of Japan's Big Four film studios and is the oldest among the Big Four. Shochiku is a member of the Motion Picture Producers Association of Japan (MPPAJ).

It also produces and distributes anime films, in particular those produced by Sunrise, a division of Bandai Namco Filmworks (which has a long-time partnership—the company released most, if not all, anime films produced by Sunrise). Its best remembered directors include Yasujirō Ozu, Kenji Mizoguchi, Mikio Naruse, Keisuke Kinoshita and Yōji Yamada. It has also produced films by highly regarded independent and "loner" directors such as Takashi Miike, Takeshi Kitano, Akira Kurosawa, Masaki Kobayashi and Taiwanese New Wave director Hou Hsiao-hsien.

== History ==
=== As Shochiku Kinema ===
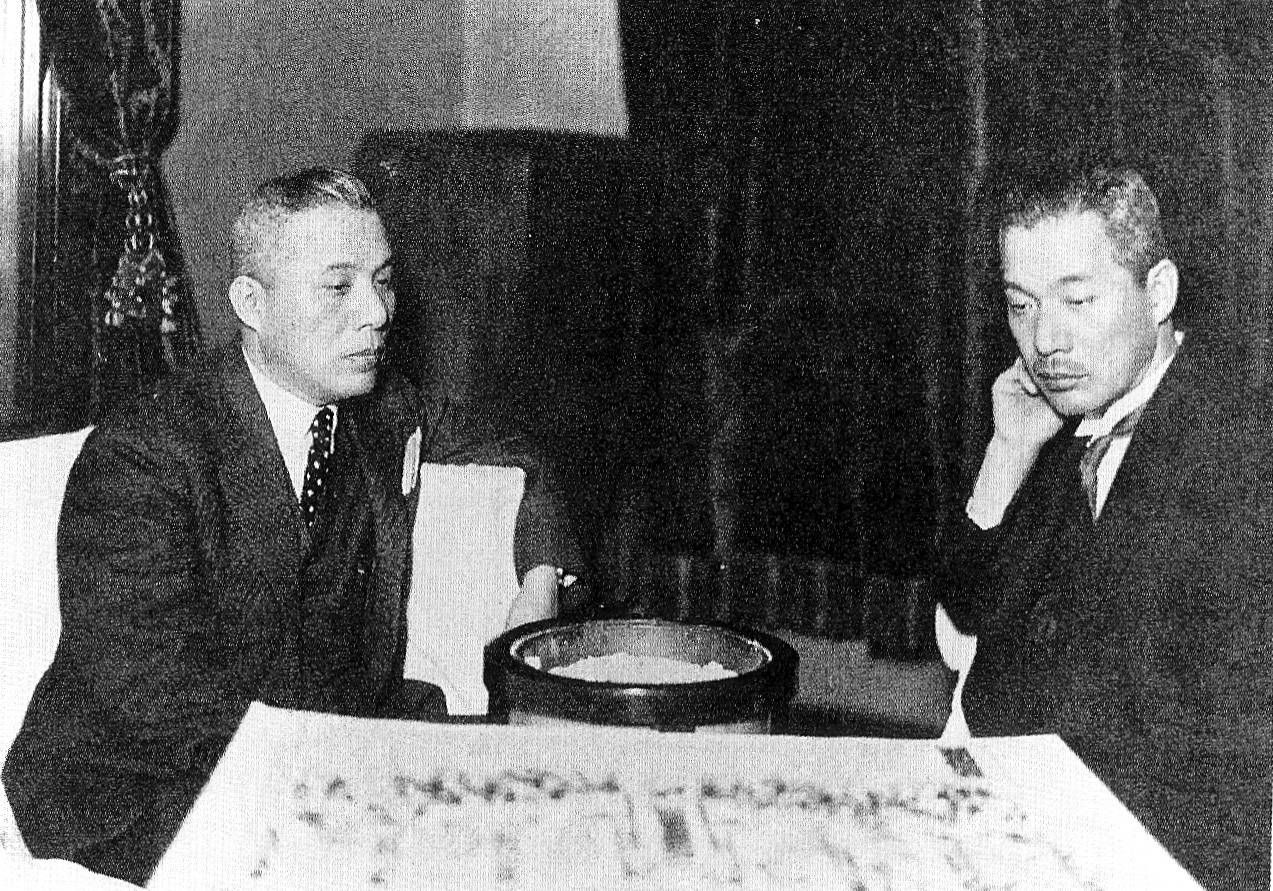
Otani Takejiro and Shirai Matsujiro in 1932

The company was founded in 1895 as a kabuki production company and later began producing films in 1920. Shochiku is considered the oldest company in Japan involved in present-day film production, but Nikkatsu began earlier as a pure film studio in 1912. Founded by the brothers Takejirō Ōtani (大谷竹次郎) and Matsujirō Shirai (白井松次郎), it was named "Matsutake" in 1902 after the combined kunyomi reading of the kanji take (bamboo) and matsu (pine) from their names, reflecting the traditional three symbols of happiness: bamboo, pine, and plum. The onyomi reading of Shōchiku first appeared in 1920 with the founding of the film production subsidiary "Shōchiku Kinema Gōmei-sha".

Shochiku grew quickly in the early years, expanding its business to many other Japanese live theatrical styles, including Noh and Bunraku, and established a near monopoly due to its ownership of theaters, as well as kabuki and shimpa drama troupes.

The company began making films in 1920, about a decade after its main rival Nikkatsu. The company sought to break away from the prevailing pattern of jidai-geki and to emulate Hollywood standards. It was the first film studio to abandon the use of female impersonators and brought new ideas, including the star system and the sound stage to Japan. It built its main studio at Kamata, named Shochiku Kamata Studio, between Tokyo and Yokohama, and hired Henry Kotani, a Japanese who had worked in Hollywood as an actor and cameraman to direct its first film, Island Woman (Shima no Onna, 1920). It also hired the prominent theater director Kaoru Osanai to head a school at the studio, which produced the film Souls on the Road (1921), a film directed by Minoru Murata which is considered "the first landmark film in Japanese history".

However, Shochiku's early history was difficult, as audiences preferred the more action-packed jidai-geki historical swashbucklers over the shinpa melodramas, and its Kamata studios were destroyed by the 1923 Great Kantō earthquake, forcing a temporary relocation to Kyoto.

With the reopening of its Kamata studios, Shochiku also introduced the shomin-geki genre, with stories reflecting the lives of the lower-middle urban classes. These dramas proved immensely popular, and marked the start of the careers of many prominent directors (including Ozu, Naruse, and Hiroshi Shimizu) and actors (including Kinuyo Tanaka).

In 1931, Shochiku released the first "talkie" made in Japan: The Neighbor's Wife and Mine (Madamu to nyōbō, 1930). Filming became increasingly difficult at the Kamata studios during the 1930s with the rapid industrialization of the surrounding area, such as the construction of munitions factories and metal foundries, and Shochiku decided to close the studio and relocate to Ofuna, near Kamakura in 1936. The following year, Shochiku Kinema was merged with its parent company, Shochiku Entertainment, and adopted the new name of Shochiku Corporation.

=== As Shochiku Corporation ===
An old Shochiku ident until 1999

During the war years, Shochiku's president, Shiro Kido, helped establish the Dai Nippon Eiga Kyokai (Greater Japan Film association), whose purpose was to coordinate the industry's efforts with Japanese government policy. From the mid-1930s until 1945, the films produced by Shochiku and other Japanese movie companies were propagandistic. After the surrender of Japan, Kido and Shochiku's co-founder Otani were arrested and charged with Class-A war crimes by the Allied occupation authorities; however, Otani's charges were ultimately dropped after the list of war criminals was deemed too large.

In 1953, after the end of the occupation, Kido returned to Shochiku and revived the melodramatic style of films which had been a Shochiku trademark in the pre-war era. Directors associated with Shochiku in this era included Ozu, Keisuke Kinoshita, and Noboru Nakamura. Many of the films during the 1950s were aimed primarily at female audiences. In particular, Hideo Oba's three-part What is Your Name? (Kimi no na wa?) in 1953 was the most commercially successful film of the period. Ozu's Tokyo Story, made in 1953, later earned considerable accolades, being selected in the 2012 Sight & Sound international critics poll as the third best film of all time.

Toho was Shochiku's primary rival during this period, competing for talent and properties as well as with the influx of Hollywood films and the rise of television. By the start of the 1960s, Shochiku's films were criticized as "old-fashioned" with the popularity of rival Nikkatsu's Taiyo-zoku youth-orientated movies. The studio responded by launching the Japanese New Wave (Nuberu bagu) which also launched the career of Nagisa Oshima among others, though Oshima soon went independent; the films of Oshima and other film makers were not financially successful and the company changed its policies.

However, the growing threat from television led to the bankruptcy of Shochiku's competitors Shintoho in 1961 and Daiei in 1971, whereas Nikkatsu and Toei turned to gangster movies and soft pornography to maintain attendance, while Toho continued to thrive with its kaiju films and prestige talent roster. Shochiku held its family-orientated audience largely due to the phenomenal success of the Tora-san series directed by Yoji Yamada from 1969 through 1997. However, with the death of its star Kiyoshi Atsumi, the series came to an end, and the company faced increasing financial difficulties. In 1986, Shochiku decided to focus on exporting products, such as towards a large, worldwide effort that was scheduled for 1987 to promote the company's classics throughout the west.

The Ofuna studio was briefly transformed into a theme park, Kamakura Cinema World, but this was closed in 1998 and the site was sold off in 2000 to Kamakura Women's College. Since that time, Shochiku has relied on its film studio and backlot in Kyoto. Yamada's "The Twilight Samurai" (Tasogare Seibei, 2002) was nominated for an Oscar as Best Foreign Language Picture.

Shochiku served as a distributor of theatrical anime. Major titles have included the Cardcaptor Sakura films, the Mobile Suit Gundam films, Origin: Spirits of the Past, Piano no Mori, Ghost in the Shell, Fullmetal Alchemist the Movie: Conqueror of Shamballa, Fullmetal Alchemist: The Sacred Star of Milos, Sword of the Stranger, Fairy Tail the Movie: Phoenix Priestess, The Dog of Flanders and Jungle Emperor Leo.

== Shareholders ==
as of October 2015

- Kabuki-za Theatrical Corp., 3.44%
- Mizuho Corporate Bank, 3.22%

== Partial list of Shochiku's films ==
- Island Woman (Shima no Onna) (1920), directed by Henry Kotani
- Souls on the Road (1921), directed by Minoru Murata
- The Neighbor's Wife and Mine (1931), directed by Heinosuke Gosho, talkie
- I Was Born, But... (1932), directed by Yasujirō Ozu
- Every-Night Dreams (1933), directed by Mikio Naruse
- Mr. Thank You (1936), directed by Hiroshi Shimizu
- Momotaro's Divine Sea Warriors, directed by Mitsuyo Seo
- A Ball at the Anjo House (1947), directed by Kozaburo Yoshimura
- President and a Female Clerk (1948), music by Akira Ifukube
- The New Version of the Ghost of Yotsuya (1949) a.k.a. Shinshaku Yotsuya kaidan; filmed in two parts
- Carmen Comes Home (1951); in Color
- The Idiot (1951); in Monochrome
- Twenty-Four Eyes (1954)
- The Mask of Destiny (1955)
- The Dancing Mistress (1957) a.k.a. Kaidan Iro-Zange Kyoran Onna Shisho, directed by Ryosuke Kurahashi
- The Ballad of Narayama (1958); in Color/GrandScope
- Harakiri (1962) a.k.a. Seppuku; in Shochiku-Regalscope
- Samurai Spy (1962) a.k.a. Spy Hunter; in Shochiku-European Scope
- The X From Outer Space (1967) a.k.a. Uchu daikaiju Guirara / Giant Space Monster Guilala, directed by Kazui Nihonmatsu; in Color/Scope
- Black Lizard (1968) a.k.a. Kurotokage; in Color/Scope
- Curse of the Blood/ Kaidan zankoku monogatari (1968) a.k.a. Cruel Ghost Legend; in Color/Scope
- Goké, Body Snatcher from Hell (1968) a.k.a. Vampire Gokemidoro; in Color/Scope
- Genocide (1968) a.k.a. War of the Insects, directed by Kazui Nihonmatsu; in Color/Scope
- The Living Skeleton (1968) in Black and White/Scope
- The Black Rose Inn (1969) a.k.a. Kurobarano yakata
- The Rendezvous (1972); in Color (Fujicolor)/CinemaScope
- The Castle of Sand (1974); in Color/Scope
- Village of the Eight Gravestones (1977) a.k.a. Yatsu hukamura
- Demon Pond (1979) a.k.a. Yashagaike
- Children of Nagasaki (1982); in Color/Widescreen
- Super Mario Bros.: The Great Mission to Rescue Princess Peach! (1986), animated feature film
- Hachikō Monogatari (1987) a.k.a. The Tale of Hachikō, directed by Seijirō Kōyama
- The Discarnates (1988); in Color/VistaVision
- Venus Wars (1989), animated feature film
- The Guyver (1991), co-produced with Brian Yuzna
- Jankenman: The Great Monster Battle (1992), animated short feature film
- Floral Magician Mary Bell: The Key of the Phoenix (1992), animated short feature film
- Fatal Fury: The Motion Picture (1994), animated feature film
- Jungle Emperor Leo (1997), animated feature film
- Cardcaptor Sakura: The Movie (1999), animated feature film
- Cardcaptor Sakura Movie 2: The Sealed Card (2000), animated feature film
- Ah! My Goddess: The Movie (2000), animated feature film
- Monster X Strikes Back: Attack the G8 Summit (2008), features the return of Guilala after 41 years of absence
- A Silent Voice (2016), animated feature film
- Violet Evergarden: Eternity and the Auto Memory Doll (2019)
- Tokyo Taxi (2025)

== See also ==
- Asakusa International Theater, a former movie theater
- Toho
- Shintoho
- Tsuburaya Productions
- Daiei Film
- Kadokawa Daiei Studio
- Nikkatsu
- Toei Company
- Nintendo
