= 1968 in Japanese television =

Events in 1968 in Japanese television.

== Channels ==
Launches:

- December 24 - TV Shizuoka

== Debuts ==
Show	Station	Premiere Date	Genre	Original Run
Cyborg 009	NET	April 5	anime	April 5, 1968 – September 27, 1968
GeGeGe no Kitaro	Fuji TV	January 3	anime	January 3, 1968 – March 30, 1969
Johnny Cypher in Dimension Zero	Fuji TV	October 21	anime	October 21, 1968 – March 29, 1969
Key Hunter	TBS	April 6	drama	April 6, 1968 - April 7, 1973
Mighty Jack	Fuji Television	April 6	tokusatsu	April 6, 1968 – June 29, 1968

== Ongoing shows ==
- Music Fair, music (1964-present)
- Hyokkori Hyō Tanjima, anime (1964-1969)

== Endings ==
Show	Station	Ending Date	Genre	Original Run
Akakage	Kansai TV	March 27	tokusatsu	April 5, 1967 – March 27, 1968
Chibikko Kaiju Yadamon	Fuji TV	March 25	anime	October 2, 1967 – March 25, 1968
Cyborg 009	NET	September 27	anime	April 5, 1968 – September 27, 1968
Giant Robo	NET	April 1	tokusatsu	October 11, 1967 – April 1, 1968
Mighty Jack	Fuji TV	April 6	tokusatsu	April 6, 1968 – June 29, 1968
Mach GoGoGo	Fuji TV	March 31	anime	April 2, 1967 - March 31, 1968
Ōgon Bat	Yomimuri TV	March 23	anime	April 1, 1967 – March 23, 1968
Oraa Guzura Dado	Fuji TV	September 25	anime	October 7, 1967 – September 25, 1968
Perman	TBS	April 14	anime	April 2, 1967 - April 14, 1968
Ribbon no Kishi	Fuji TV	April 7	anime	April 2, 1967 – April 7, 1968
Ultra Seven	TBS	September 8	tokusatsu	October 1, 1967 – September 8, 1968

== See also ==
- 1968 in anime
- 1968 in Japan
- List of Japanese films of 1968
