= 1968 in film =

The year 1968 in film involved some significant events, notably the releases of Stanley Kubrick's 2001: A Space Odyssey and Franklin J. Schaffner's Planet of the Apes, as well as two highly successful musical films, Funny Girl and Oliver!, the former earning Barbra Streisand the Academy Award for Best Actress (an honour she shared with Katharine Hepburn for her role in The Lion in Winter) and the latter winning both the Best Picture and Best Director awards.

== Events ==
- June 12 – Roman Polanski's controversial horror film Rosemary's Baby is released in the United States.
- October – Popular manga series Golgo 13 is launched in Japan, eventually resulting in two live-action feature films, an anime film, an original video animation, an anime television series and six video games.
- November 1 – The MPAA's film rating system is introduced.

== Awards ==
Category/Organization	26th Golden Globe Awards February 24, 1969		41st Academy Awards April 14, 1969	22nd BAFTA Awards April 14, 1969
Category/Organization	Drama	Comedy or Musical	41st Academy Awards April 14, 1969	22nd BAFTA Awards April 14, 1969
Best Film	The Lion in Winter	Oliver!		The Graduate
Best Director	Paul Newman; Rachel, Rachel		Carol Reed; Oliver!	Mike Nichols; The Graduate
Best Actor	Peter O'Toole; The Lion in Winter	Ron Moody; Oliver!	Cliff Robertson; Charly	Spencer Tracy; Guess Who's Coming to Dinner
Best Actress	Joanne Woodward; Rachel, Rachel	Barbra Streisand; Funny Girl	Katharine Hepburn; The Lion in Winter; Barbra Streisand; Funny Girl	Katharine Hepburn; Guess Who's Coming to Dinner; The Lion in Winter
Best Supporting Actor	Daniel Massey; Star		Jack Albertson; The Subject Was Roses	Ian Holm; The Bofors Gun
Best Supporting Actress	Ruth Gordon; Rosemary's Baby			Billie Whitelaw; Twisted Nerve; Charlie Bubbles
Best Screenplay, Adapted	Stirling Silliphant; Charly		James Goldman; The Lion in Winter	Buck Henry and Calder Willingham; The Graduate
Best Screenplay, Original	Stirling Silliphant; Charly		Mel Brooks; The Producers	Buck Henry and Calder Willingham; The Graduate
Best Original Score	Alex North; The Shoes of the Fisherman		John Barry; The Lion in Winter; Johnny Green; Oliver!	John Barry; The Lion in Winter
Best Original Song	"The Windmills of Your Mind"; The Thomas Crown Affair			N/A
Best Foreign Language Film	War and Peace			N/A

Palme d'Or (Cannes Film Festival): canceled due to events of May 1968

Golden Lion (Venice Film Festival):

Die Artisten in der Zirkuskuppel: Ratlos (Artists under the Big Top: Perplexed), directed by Alexander Kluge, West Germany

Golden Bear (Berlin Film Festival):

Ole dole doff (Who Saw Him Die?), directed by Jan Troell, Sweden

== Top-grossing films (U.S.) ==
The top ten 1968 released films by box office gross in North America are as follows:

Highest-grossing films of 1968
Rank	Title	Distributor	Domestic rentals
1	Funny Girl	Columbia	$24,900,000
2	2001: A Space Odyssey	MGM	$21,500,000
3	The Odd Couple	Paramount	$20,000,000
4	Bullitt	Warner Bros.	$19,000,000
5	Oliver!	Columbia	$16,800,000
6	Planet of the Apes	20th Century Fox	$15,000,000
7	Rosemary's Baby	Paramount	$15,000,000
8	Romeo and Juliet	Paramount	$14,500,000
9	Yours, Mine and Ours	United Artists	$11,500,000
10	The Lion in Winter	AVCO Embassy	$10,006,000

== 1968 films ==
=== By country/region ===
- List of American films of 1968
- List of Argentine films of 1968
- List of Australian films of 1968
- List of Bangladeshi films of 1968
- List of British films of 1968
- List of Canadian films of 1968
- List of French films of 1968
- List of Hong Kong films of 1968
- List of Indian films of 1968
  - List of Hindi films of 1968
  - List of Kannada films of 1968
  - List of Malayalam films of 1968
  - List of Marathi films of 1968
  - List of Tamil films of 1968
  - List of Telugu films of 1968
- List of Japanese films of 1968
- List of Mexican films of 1968
- List of Pakistani films of 1968
- List of South Korean films of 1968
- List of Soviet films of 1968
- List of Spanish films of 1968

=== By genre/medium ===
- List of action films of 1968
- List of animated feature films of 1968
- List of avant-garde films of 1968
- List of comedy films of 1968
- List of drama films of 1968
- List of horror films of 1968
- List of science fiction films of 1968
- List of thriller films of 1968
- List of western films of 1968

== Short film series ==
- Looney Tunes (1930–1969)
- Merrie Melodies (1931–1969)
- Speedy Gonzales (1953–1968)
- Daffy Duck (1937–1968)
- Cool Cat (1967–1969)
- Merlin the Magic Mouse (1967–1969)

== Births ==
- January 1 - Tom DeSanto, American producer and screenwriter
- January 2
  - Cuba Gooding Jr., American actor
  - Evan Parke, Jamaican-born American actor
- January 5 - Carrie Ann Inaba, American actress and singer
- January 6 – John Singleton, American director and writer (d. 2019)
- January 9 – Joey Lauren Adams, American actress
- January 12
  - Farrah Forke, American actress (d. 2022)
  - Rachael Harris, American actor and comedian
- January 14 – LL Cool J, American rapper, actor
- January 15
  - Rosanne Sorrentino, American former child actress
  - Chad Lowe, American actor
- January 17 - Louis Lombardi, American actor
- January 18 - David Ayer, American filmmaker
- January 19 – Matt Hill, Canadian actor, voice actor, comedian
- January 20
  - Chris Miller, American voice actor, animator, director, screenwriter and storyboard artist
  - Melissa Rivers, American television host and actress
- January 29 – Edward Burns, American actor and producer
- January 31 - Matt King, English actor, DJ and comedian
- February 1 – Pauly Shore, American actor
- February 8 - Gary Coleman, American actor and comedian (d. 2010)
- February 12
  - Josh Brolin, American actor
  - Chynna Phillips, American singer and actress
- February 13 - Kelly Hu, American actress, voice artist, former fashion model and beauty queen
- February 14
  - Alicia Borrachero, Spanish actress
  - Phil Lewis, American actor, comedian and director
- February 15 - Robert Schwentke, German director and screenwriter
- February 18 – Molly Ringwald, American actress
- February 21 - Patrick Gallagher, Canadian actor
- February 24 - Mitch Hedberg, American stand-up comedian (d. 2005)
- March 2 – Daniel Craig, British actor
- March 4 – Patsy Kensit, English actress
- March 6 - Moira Kelly, American actress
- March 11 - Simone Buchanan, Australian actress
- March 12
  - Aaron Eckhart, American actor
  - Jason Lively, American actor
- March 14 - James Frain, English actor
- March 15 - Sean Bridgers, American actor, screenwriter and producer
- March 18 - Juan Carlos Vellido, Spanish actor
- March 20
  - Jaime Cardriche, American actor (d. 2000)
  - Lawrence Makoare, New Zealand actor of Māori descent
- March 21 - Greg Ellis, English actor
- March 23 - Abigail Cruttenden, English actress
- March 26 - Max Perlich, American actor
- March 29
  - Sabrina Impacciatore, Italian actress
  - Lucy Lawless, New Zealand actress and singer
- March 30
  - Donna D'Errico, American actress
  - Celine Dion, Canadian singer
  - Roland Kickinger, Austrian actor and bodybuilder
- April 3 - Charlotte Coleman, English actress (d. 2001)
- April 8
  - Patricia Arquette, American actress
  - Shawn Fonteno, American actor and rapper
- April 9 - Jay Chandrasekhar, American comedian, director, screenwriter, actor and editor
- April 10 - Orlando Jones, American stand-up comedian and actor
- April 11 - Dimitri Diatchenko, American actor (d. 2020)
- April 12 - Alicia Coppola, American actress
- April 13 - Andrew Pleavin, English actor
- April 14 – Anthony Michael Hall, American actor
- April 16 - John Gatins, American screenwriter, director and actor
- April 17 - Adam McKay, American director, producer, screenwriter and comedian
- April 18
  - Mary Birdsong, American actress, comedian, writer and singer
  - David Hewlett, British-born Canadian actor, writer and director
- April 19 – Ashley Judd, American actress
- April 22 - Piera Coppola, American voice actress
- April 23 – Chris Williams, Canadian-American animator, director, screenwriter and voice actor
- April 24
  - Aidan Gillen, Irish actor
  - Stacy Haiduk, American actress
- May 3 – Amy Ryan, American actress
- May 6 - Paul Bazely, English actor
- May 7 - Traci Lords, American actress and singer
- May 10 - Adrian Scarborough, English actor
- May 11 - Jeffrey Donovan, American actor
- May 12 - Tony Hawk, American actor and professional skateboarder
- May 16 - Stephen Mangan, English actor, comedian and presenter
- May 19 - Kyle Eastwood, American film composer
- May 20 – Timothy Olyphant, American actor
- May 21 - Tom Goodman-Hill, English actor
- May 25
  - Kevin Heffernan, American actor, writer, producer and director
  - Joseph D. Reitman, American actor, producer, director and writer
- May 27 - Spencer Kayden, American actress, comedian and writer
- May 28 - Kylie Minogue, Australian actress and singer
- June 2
  - Navid Negahban, Iranian-American actor
  - Nickolai Stoilov, Bulgarian-American actor and writer
- June 4
  - Sean Gullette, American director, writer, screenwriter, actor and producer
  - Joey Mazzarino, American actor, puppeteer, writer and director
  - Scott Wolf, American actor
- June 9 - Eddie Marsan, English actor
- June 10 - Bill Burr, American stand-up comedian, actor and writer
- June 12 - Sarah Trigger, retired British actress
- June 14 - Faizon Love, Cuban-born American actor and comedian
- June 15 - Fred Tatasciore, American voice actor
- June 16 - James Patrick Stuart, American actor
- June 17 - Mary Stein, American actress
- June 18 - Jay Tavare, American actor
- June 19 - Kim Walker, American actress (d. 2001)
- June 20
  - Jon Glaser, American actor, comedian and writer
  - Robert Rodriguez, American filmmaker and visual effects supervisor
  - Samantha Spiro, English actress and singer
- June 26 - Travis Fine, American actor, writer, director and producer
- June 27 - Paul Rae, American actor
- June 29 - Brian d'Arcy James, American actor and musician
- July 1 - Jordi Mollà, Spanish actor, writer and filmmaker
- July 5 - Michael Stuhlbarg, American actor
- July 7
  - Danny Jacobs, American actor and comedian
  - Allen Payne, American actor
- July 8 – Billy Crudup, American actor
- July 11 – Conrad Vernon, American voice actor, director, writer and storyboard artist
- July 15
  - Rosalinda Celentano, Italian actress
  - Eddie Griffin, American comedian and actor
  - Stan Kirsch, American actor (d. 2020)
- July 17 - Beth Littleford, American actress and comedian
- July 18
  - Grant Bowler, New-Zealand-Australian actor
  - Alex Désert, American actor and musician
- July 19 - William Houston, English actor
- July 21 - Samuli Edelmann, Finnish actor and singer
- July 23 - Shawn Levy, Canadian director, producer and actor
- July 24
  - Kristin Chenoweth, American actress and singer
  - Troy Kotsur, American actor
  - Laura Leighton, American actress
- July 26 – Olivia Williams, British actress
- July 27
  - Cliff Curtis, New Zealand actor
  - Julian McMahon, Australian-American actor (d. 2025)
- July 30 - Terry Crews, American actor, comedian, activist, artist, bodybuilder and former professional football player
- August 4 - Daniel Dae Kim, South Korean-American actor and producer
- August 6 - Lisa Boyle, American actress
- August 7 - Sophie Lee, Australian actress
- August 8 - Jimmy Jean-Louis, Haitian actor and producer
- August 9
  - Gillian Anderson, American-British actress
  - Eric Bana, Australian actor
  - McG, American director and producer
- August 10
  - Cate Shortland, Australian screenwriter, director and writer
  - Rickey Smiley, American stand-up comedian, television host and actor
- August 11
  - Anna Gunn, American actress
  - Sophie Okonedo, British actress
- August 14
  - Catherine Bell, British actress and model
  - Terry Notary, American actor and stunt co-ordinator/double
- August 15 - Debra Messing, American actress
- August 17
  - Andrew Koenig, American character actor, director, editor and writer (d. 2010)
  - Helen McCrory, English actress (d. 2021)
- August 21 - Julian Lewis Jones, Welsh actor
- August 22 - Casper Christensen, Danish comedian and actor
- August 25
  - David Alan Basche, American actor
  - Raz Degan, Israeli actor, director and cinematographer
- August 27 - Lisa Marie Newmyer, American actress
- August 28 – Billy Boyd, Scottish actor
- September 2
  - Kristen Cloke, American actress
  - Jonathan Goldstein, American filmmaker
- September 4 – John DiMaggio, American actor and voice actor
- September 5 - Glenn Fleshler, American actor
- September 6 - Mark Ivanir, Israeli actor
- September 7 - Camille Japy, Belgian-French actor
- September 8
  - Brian Huskey, American character actor, comedian and writer
  - Simon J. Smith, British animator, director, visual effects artist and voice actor
- September 9
  - Nathan Lee Graham, American actor and singer
  - Julia Sawalha, English actress
- September 10 – Guy Ritchie, English director, screenwriter
- September 12 - Paul F. Tompkins, American comedian, actor and writer
- September 15 – Danny Nucci, American actor
- September 16
  - Marc Anthony, American singer-songwriter and actor
  - Walt Becker, American filmmaker
- September 19 – Shawn Doyle, Canadian actor
- September 20 - Chad Stahelski, American stuntman and director
- September 22 – Megan Hollingshead, American voice actress
- September 23 - Michelle Thomas, American actress (d. 1998)
- September 25
  - Eddie Baroo, Australian actor, screenwriter and singer
  - Will Smith, American actor
- September 26
  - Jim Caviezel, American actor
  - Ben Shenkman, American actor
- September 27
  - Patrick Muldoon, American actor, film producer, and musician (d. 2026)
  - Charlie Spradling, retired American actress
- September 28 – Naomi Watts, British actress
- September 29
  - Massi Furlan, Italian-American actor and producer
  - Luke Goss, English actor
- October – Musola Cathrine Kaseketi, Zambian director
- October 1 - Jay Underwood, American actor
- October 2
  - Lucy Cohu, English actress
  - Joey Slotnick, American actor
  - Curtiss Cook, American character actor
- October 8 - Emily Procter, American actress
- October 9
  - Pete Docter, American animator, director, screenwriter, producer, voice actor and chief creative officer of Pixar
  - James Dreyfus, English actor
- October 11
  - Tiffany Grant, American voice actress
  - Jane Krakowski, American actress and singer
- October 12
  - Hugh Jackman, Australian actor
  - Adam Rich, American actor (d. 2023)
- October 13
  - Tisha Campbell, American actress
  - Alex Ferns, Scottish actor and television personality
- October 16
  - Randall Batinkoff, American actor
  - Todd Stashwick, American actor
  - Elsa Zylberstein, French actress
- October 17 - Ziggy Marley, Jamaican singer-songwriter, musician and actor
- October 19 - Yayan Ruhian, Indonesian martial artist and actor
- October 22 - Jay Johnston, American actor and comedian
- October 23 - Maria Darling, British voice actress
- October 24 - Mark Walton, American story artist and voice actor
- October 25
  - Melinda McGraw, American actress
  - Christopher McQuarrie, American screenwriter, director and producer
- October 27 – Dileep, Indian actor
- October 28 - Stephen Hunter, New Zealand actor
- October 29
  - John Farley, American actor and comedian
  - Grayson McCouch, American actor
- November 4 - Gary Stretch, British boxer, actor, producer and screenwriter
- November 5
  - J.D. Evermore, American actor
  - Sam Rockwell, American actor
  - Aitana Sánchez-Gijón, Spanish-Italian actress
- November 6 – Kelly Rutherford, American actress
- November 8
  - Bruno Gunn, American actor
  - Parker Posey, American actress
- November 9 - Erol Sander, Turkish-German actor
- November 10
  - Tracy Morgan, American actor, voice actor and comedian
  - Tom Papa, American actor and comedian
- November 12 - Aya Hisakawa, Japanese voice actress and singer
- November 16 - James Parks, American actor
- November 18
  - Romany Malco, American actor and rapper
  - Owen Wilson, American actor
- November 19
  - Mark Bonnar, Scottish actor
  - Derek Drymon, American animator, writer, storyboard artist, director, comedian and producer
- November 21
  - Todd Farmer, American screenwriter and actor
  - Sean Schemmel, American voice actor
- November 23
  - Brennan Brown, American actor
  - Jake La Botz, American singer-songwriter and actor
- November 25 - Jill Hennessy, Canadian actress and singer
- November 26 - Chris Coppola, American actor and comedian
- November 27 - Michael Vartan, French-American actor
- December 2
  - Lucy Liu, American actress
  - Suzy Nakamura, American actress
- December 3 – Brendan Fraser, American-Canadian actor
- December 5 - Margaret Cho, American stand-up comedian, actress and musician
- December 6
  - Oliver Masucci, German actor
  - Donnell Rawlings, American comedian, actor and radio host
- December 7 – Greg Ayres, American voice actor
- December 13 - Scott Stuber, American film producer
- December 16 - Peter Dante, American character actor, comedian and singer
- December 18
  - Craig Grant, American poet and actor (d. 2021)
  - Casper Van Dien, American actor
  - Daniel Oreskes, American actor
  - Nina Wadia, British actress and comedian
- December 19
  - Marcial Di Fonzo Bo, Argentine actor
  - Ken Marino, American actor, comedian, and screenwriter
- December 20 - Joe Cornish, English comedian and filmmaker
- December 22 - Dina Meyer, American actress
- December 23 - Angela Jones, American actress
- December 25 - Klea Scott, Panamanian-born Canadian actress
- December 26 - Byron Howard, American animator, director, producer and screenwriter

== Deaths ==
- January 7 - Hugo Butler, 53, Canadian screenwriter, Edison, the Man, Lassie Come Home
- January 18 – John Ridgely, 58, American actor, The Big Sleep, God Is My Co-Pilot
- January 25 - Virginia Maskell, 31, British actress, Only Two Can Play, Virgin Island
- February 4 – Eddie Baker, 70, American actor, Oranges and Lemons, Giant
- February 7 – Nick Adams, 36, American actor, Pillow Talk, Rebel Without a Cause
- February 13 – Mae Marsh, 73, American actress, The Birth of a Nation, 3 Godfathers
- February 20 – Anthony Asquith, 65, British director, The V.I.P.s, The Winslow Boy
- March 10 – Helen Walker, 47, American actress, Impact, Call Northside 777
- March 11 – Pearl Doles Bell, 84, American film scenarist, novelist and editor, Her Elephant Man
- March 16 – June Collyer, 63, American actress, Hangman's House, A Face in the Fog
- March 18 - Harry Kurnitz, 60, American screenwriter, Witness for the Prosecution, How to Steal a Million
- March 20 – Carl Theodor Dreyer, 79, Danish director, The Passion of Joan of Arc, Gertrud
- March 24 – Alice Guy-Blaché, 94, pioneer French/American filmmaker, The Pit and the Pendulum, The Great Adventure
- March 30 – Bobby Driscoll, 31, American actor, Peter Pan, Treasure Island
- April 5 – Lois Andrews, 44, American actress, Dixie Dugan, The Desert Hawk
- April 6 – Keith Pyott, 66, English actor, Village of the Damned
- April 16 – Fay Bainter, 74, American actress, Woman of the Year, The Children's Hour
- April 24 – Tommy Noonan, 46, American actor, A Star is Born, Gentlemen Prefer Blondes
- May 5 – Albert Dekker, 62, American actor, The Wild Bunch, Kiss Me Deadly
- May 9
  - Albert Lewin, 73, American director, Pandora and the Flying Dutchman, The Picture of Dorian Gray
  - Marion Lorne, 84, American actress, The Graduate, Strangers on a Train
- May 10 – Scotty Beckett, 38, American actor, My Favorite Wife, The Jolson Story
- May 21 – Doris Lloyd, 71, British actress, Disraeli, Kind Lady
- May 23 – James Burke, 81, American actor, Little Orphan Annie, The Timber Trail
- May 25 – Charles K. Feldman, 64, American producer, A Streetcar Named Desire, The Seven Year Itch
- May 26 - Joseph MacDonald, 62, Mexico-born American cinematographer, My Darling Clementine, The Young Lions
- May 27 – Denise Legeay, 70, French actress, Happy Couple, Zigano
- May 31 – Preben Uglebjerg, 37, Danish actor, Pigen og vandpytten
- June 4 – Dorothy Gish, 70, American actress, The Cardinal, Orphans of the Storm
- June 7 – Dan Duryea, 61, American actor, Winchester '73, Scarlet Street
- June 8 - Patricia Jessel, 47, British actress, The City of the Dead, A Funny Thing Happened on the Way to the Forum
- June 21 – Ingeborg Spangsfeldt, 72, Danish actress
- June 24 – Tony Hancock, 44, British comedian, Call Me Genius, The Punch and Judy Man
- June 29 – Hans Egede Budtz, 78, Danish actor, Nøddebo Præstegård
- July 1 – Virginia Weidler, 41, American actress, The Philadelphia Story, The Women
- July 12 – Antonio Pietrangeli, 49, Italian director, It Happened in Rome, The Magnificent Cuckold
- July 27 – Lilian Harvey, 62, British actress and singer, Waltz of Love, Let's Live Tonight
- July 30 – Alexander Hall, 74, American director, Here Comes Mr. Jordan, Little Miss Marker
- August 23 – Hunt Stromberg, 74, American producer, The Thin Man, The Great Ziegfeld
- August 25 – John George, 70, Ottoman-born American actor, Charley's Aunt, Don Juan
- August 26 – Kay Francis, 63, American actress, Black Orchids, Little Men
- August 30 – William Talman, 53, American actor, The Hitch-Hiker, Crashout
- August 31 – Dennis O'Keefe, 60, American actor, T-Men, Raw Deal
- September 3 – Isabel Withers, 72, American actress, Possessed, Lady of Burlesque
- September 16 - Nedrick Young, 54, American screenwriter, Inherit the Wind, The Defiant Ones
- September 18 – Franchot Tone, 63, American actor, The Mutiny on the Bounty, Advise & Consent
- September 24 - Virginia Valli, 70, American actress, The Pleasure Garden, Evening Clothes
- October 18 – Lee Tracy, 70, American actor, Dinner at Eight, The Best Man
- October 29 – Pert Kelton, 61, American actress, The Music Man, Sing and Like It
- October 30 – Ramon Novarro, 69, Mexican actor, Ben-Hur, Mata Hari
- November 8 – Wendell Corey, 54, American actor, Rear Window, Harriet Craig
- November 9 – Gerald Mohr, 54, American actor, Gilda, The Angry Red Planet
- November 13 – Berthold Bartosch, 74, Bohemian filmmaker, The Idea
- November 18 – Walter Wanger, 74, American producer, Cleopatra, I Want to Live!
- November 20 – Helen Gardner, 84 American actress, Cleopatra
- November 25 – Upton Sinclair, 90, American author and producer, There Will Be Blood, The Gnome-Mobile
- December 2 – Colin Kenny, 79, Irish actor, The Adventures of Robin Hood, Captain Blood
- December 4 - Archie Mayo, 77, American director, The Petrified Forest, A Night in Casablanca
- December 5 – Fred Clark, 54, American actor, White Heat, Auntie Mame
- December 12 – Tallulah Bankhead, 66, American actress, Lifeboat, Stage Door Canteen, Die! Die! My Darling
- December 14 – Jack Rice, 75, American actor, Lady, Let's Dance, Beware of Blondie
- December 15 – Dorothy Abbott, 47, American actress, South Pacific, Red, Hot and Blue
- December 20 - John Steinbeck, 66, American author and screenwriter, Viva Zapata!, The Red Pony
- December 28 - Harry Woods, 79, American actor, Days of Jesse James, The Ghost Rider

== Film debuts ==
- Rutanya Alda – Greetings
- John Aprea – Bullitt
- Robin Askwith – if...
- Eileen Atkins – Inadmissible Evidence
- Tom Atkins – The Detective
- Florinda Bolkan – Candy
- Philip Bosco – A Lovely Way to Die
- Sônia Braga – The Red Light Bandit
- Wilford Brimley – Bandolero!
- Don Calfa – No More Excuses
- Joanna Cassidy – Bullitt
- John Cleese – Interlude
- Corinne Cléry – Les Poneyttes
- Sam Coppola – No Way to Treat a Lady
- Kenneth Cranham – Oliver!
- Patti D'Arbanville – Flesh
- Timothy Dalton – The Lion in Winter
- Sybil Danning – Komm nur, mein liebstes Vögelein
- Don Fellows – The Detective
- Frederic Forrest – The Filthy Five
- Allen Garfield – Greetings
- Ellen Geer – Petulia
- Marla Gibbs – Yours, Mine and Ours
- Gerrit Graham – Greetings
- Jon Gries – Will Penny
- John Hallam – The Charge of the Light Brigade
- Goldie Hawn – The One and Only, Genuine, Original Family Band
- Don Henderson – A Midsummer Night's Dream
- Barbara Hershey – With Six You Get Eggroll
- Howard Hesseman – Petulia
- Anthony Hopkins – The Lion in Winter
- Bo Hopkins – Dayton's Devils
- Lauren Hutton – Paper Lion
- Graham Jarvis – Bye Bye Braverman
- Tony Jay – Majuba: Heuwel van Duiwe
- Lainie Kazan – Dayton's Devils
- Stacy Keach – The Heart Is a Lonely Hunter
- Udo Kier – Shameless
- Sally Kirkland – Blue
- Terry Kiser – Rachel, Rachel
- Ittoku Kishibe – Za taigâsu: Sekai wa bokura o matteiru
- Richard Libertini – The Night They Raided Minsky's
- Roger Lloyd-Pack – The Magus
- Peter Maloney – Greetings
- Chuck McCann – The Heart Is a Lonely Hunter
- Malcolm McDowell – if...
- Chuck Norris – The Wrecking Crew
- Jennifer O'Neill – For Love of Ivy
- Austin Pendleton – Petulia
- Barry Primus – The Brotherhood
- David Proval – The Boston Strangler
- Paul Reubens – The Brotherhood
- Joely Richardson – The Charge of the Light Brigade
- Talia Shire – The Wild Racers
- Donald Sumpter – The Lost Continent
- Leigh Taylor-Young – I Love You, Alice B. Toklas
- Dan van Husen – The Cats
