= Goke, Body Snatcher from Hell =

1968 film directed by Hajime Sato

Goké, Body Snatcher from Hell
- Theatrical release poster
- Directed by: Hajime Sato
- Screenplay by: Susumu Takaku; Kyuzo Kobayashi
- Based on: Gokemidoro by Tomio Sagisu
- Produced by: Takashi Inomata
- Starring: Teruo Yoshida; Tomomi Sato; Eizo Kitamura; Hideo Ko; Kazuo Kato; Yuko Kusunoki; Masaya Takahashi; Nobuo Kaneko
- Cinematography: Shizuo Hirase
- Edited by: Akimitsu Terada
- Music by: Shunsuke Kikuchi
- Production company: Shochiku
- Distributed by: Shochiku
- Release date: August 14, 1968 (Japan)
- Running time: 84 minutes
- Country: Japan
- Languages: Japanese; English

Goké, Body Snatcher from Hell (Japanese: 吸血鬼ゴケミドロ, Hepburn: Kyūketsuki Gokemidoro; lit. 'Vampire Gokemidoro') (Note: Also known as Goké the Vampire) is a 1968 Japanese science fiction horror film directed by Hajime Sato. The film is loosely based on the 1967 tokusatsu series Gokemidoro, produced by P Productions.

== Plot ==
After receiving a radio message about a bomb threat against the plane, co-pilot Sugisaka checks the passengers' bags for the bomb, clearing them all, apart from one man who has no bag. Stewardess Kuzumi opens an unaccompanied suitcase under a bench, finding a rifle. The man pulls a gun on Sugisaka and orders the pilot to fly to Okinawa. He shoots out the plane's transistor radio just as it breaks the news about a UFO over Japan with Japanese and U.S. Air Force fighters in pursuit. A luminous object streaks past overhead, knocking out the airplane's control and causing an engine fire. The aircraft crashes on an uncharted deserted island.

Only a handful of people survived the crash: Sugisaka; Kuzumi; Mrs. Neal, an American widow; Senator Mano of the Constitutional Democratic Party; weapons exporter Tokiyasu and his wife Noriko; psychiatrist Momotake; space biologist Professor Sagai; and the young man who called in the bomb threat. The hijacker suddenly sits up, grabs Kuzumi, and escapes into the jungle, encountering the spaceship. Kuzumi hides, but the hijacker steps into a clearing and walks toward the spaceship as if he were called to it. A dark blob oozes towards the hijacker, whose forehead splits wide open, causing Kuzumi to scream and pass out.

Sugisaka finds the unconscious Kuzumi and carries her back to the plane. Dr. Momotake later hypnotizes her to recount the events in the jungle. The teenager who called in the bomb threat attacks Dr. Momotake, causing him to fall off a cliff, where he comes across the hijacker, who kills him by draining his blood.

As the survivors discuss finding water, they hear a knock at the door. Sugisaka opens it to find the hijacker lying on the ground with a big scar on his forehead. The survivors carry the hijacker inside and dress his wound. Tokiyasu then uses the rifle to force everyone out of the plane, and he locks himself safely inside with the hijacker. Right after, Tokiyasu's screams are heard, and the door unlocks. Everyone goes inside to find Tokiyasu dead, drained of all blood. The hijacker appears and carries Noriko off to the spaceship. At sunrise, Noriko is seen standing on a ridge. She speaks, but with the voice of the alien, the Gokemidoro. It is revealed that the Gokemidoro has invaded Earth, intending to eradicate the human race. Noriko then plunges off the ridge, shriveling into a cadaver.

The passengers argue about whether extraterrestrials would invade Earth. Professor Sagai theorizes that the hijacker turned into a vampire. Mano challenges them to prove there are vampires, causing the others to plan to sacrifice someone to the Gokemidoro. The survivors shove the teenager outside as the hijacker slowly advances towards him. The teenager pulls out the bomb he has been hiding and threatens to blow up the plane unless they let him back in. They refuse, and the teenager triggers the bomb, killing himself and blowing a large opening in the airplane, wounding Professor Sagai. Mano runs off with Mrs. Neal. When the hijacker catches up with them, Mano pushes Mrs. Neal toward hijacker to save himself. Mrs. Neal shoots several times but misses. The hijacker kills her.

Mano escapes back to the plane with the hijacker right behind him. The remaining survivors leave the plane to help Mano, but he runs past them, locking the plane door behind him. While Mano watches from inside the airplane, Sugisaka tosses a bucket of airplane fuel at the hijacker, then sets him on fire.

The Gokemidoro crawls out of the burning hijacker, creeps into the plane, and enters Professor Sagai's forehead. Sagai drains Mano, then turns to Sugisaka and Kuzumi, who manage to escape. Sagai follows them until he is swept off a hill by a landslide. Sugisaka and Kuzumi keep running while Sagai goes back to the spaceship. Once there, the Gokemidoro crawls out, reducing Sagai to dust.

Sugisaka and Kuzumi reach a highway, finding every human in the cars and the city dead. The Gokemidoro informs them that no one will be spared.

In the epilogue, Sugisaka and Kuzumi are wandering on rocky terrain. In orbit around Earth, a whole fleet of Gokemidoro spaceships awaits the order to attack.

== Cast ==
- Teruo Yoshida as Ei Sugisaka
- Tomomi Sato as Kazumi Asakura
- Eizo Kitamura as Gôzô Mano
- Hideo Ko as Hirofumi Teraoka
- Kathy Horan as Mrs. Neal
- Yuko Kusunoki as Noriko Tokuyasu
- Harold Conway as the Ambassador
- Kazuo Kato as Dr. Momotake
- Hiroyuki Nishimoto as the airplane captain
- Nobuo Kaneko as Mr. Tokuyasu
- Masaya Takahashi as Toshiyuki Saga
- Toshihiko Yamamoto as Matsumiya
- Keiichi Noda as Gokemidoro (voice)

== Release ==
Goké, Body Snatcher from Hell was released in Japan on 14 August 1968. It was released by Pacemaker Films in the United States in 1977. When released to U.S. television and home video, the film was re-titled Body Snatcher From Hell.

It was released on DVD by the Criterion Collection in a box set on November 20, 2012. Other films in the box set included The X from Outer Space, The Living Skeleton, and Genocide.

== Reception and legacy ==
An article on Turner Classic Movies written in 2006 calls Goké, Body Snatcher from Hell a "masterpiece" of 1960s sci-fi, noting: "Dark and intense (like cinematic espresso), Goke had no obvious place in the scheme of marketing Japanese SF to the West. Too far off the Godzilla reservation, it was simply ignored for years."

In a contemporary review, the Monthly Film Bulletin reviewed an 83-minute English-dubbed version of the film. The review described the film as an "Uninspired mélange of flying saucers and vampirism" that was "woodenly directed and bogged down by long stretches of melodramatic dissension among the characters which acts as an uneasy springboard for much preaching and moralizing about why mankind deserves to be taken over by invaders from another world."

Goké, Body Snatcher from Hell has gained a cult following and influenced numerous works. Most notably, Quentin Tarantino, an outspoken admirer, paid homage to it in Kill Bill: Volume 1 (2003) by including an almost identical shot of a plane flying against a vivid, eerie red sky, which he filmed at a Japanese studio. It also inspired John Carpenter's The Thing (1982).

Japanese filmmaker Masaharu Take has described the movie as a source of profound childhood trauma, explaining that it left a deep and lasting impression on him as a young viewer. He has since expressed interest in remaking it.

== See also ==
- List of horror films of 1968
- List of Japanese films of 1968
