= Masaya Takahashi (actor) =

Japanese actor (1930–2014)

- 高橋 昌也
- Born: March 16, 1930; Ushigome, Tokyo, Empire of Japan (now Shinjuku, Tokyo)
- Died: January 16, 2014 (aged 83); Yamanashi Prefecture, Japan
- Occupations: Actor, theatre director
- Years active: 1954–2013
- Spouse(s): Haruko Kato (m. 1958; div. 1973) Yachiyo Fujii (m. 1974; div. 1999) Unknown (m. 1999–2014)
- Children: 1

Masaya Takahashi (高橋 昌也, Takahashi Masaya; March 16, 1930 – January 16, 2014) was a Japanese actor and theatre director. He appeared in a wide range of films over six decades, including Goke, Body Snatcher from Hell (1968), Belladonna of Sadness (1973), Godzilla, Mothra and King Ghidorah: Giant Monsters All-Out Attack (2001), Returner (2002), and Air Doll (2009).

== Life and career ==
Masaya Takahashi was born on March 16, 1930, in Ushigome (present-day Shinjuku), Tokyo. He graduated from Tokyo Metropolitan Toyama High School and later from the Haiyuza Acting School (second class). He began his career in 1954 by participating in the founding of the Shinjin-kai theatre company.

Over the following decades, he was a central figure in Japanese theatre, joining Shiki Theatre Company in 1956 and Bungakuza in 1961. In 1963, he left Bungakuza with actors including Hiroshi Akutagawa, Hitoshi Takagi, and Kyōko Kishida to help establish Gekidan Kumo. Following the company's split in 1975, he joined Engekishūdan En, where he shifted focus primarily to directing, notably staging many plays by Minoru Betsuyaku.

In 1987, Takahashi became artistic director of the Ginza Saison Theatre, a position he held until the theatre closed in 1999. During this period, he directed numerous stage productions, including the long-running overseas comedy series starring Tetsuko Kuroyanagi. He maintained a close professional and personal friendship with Kuroyanagi for nearly 60 years. Although he largely paused his acting work while serving as artistic director, he returned to film and television roles in the 2000s.

He was married three times: first to actress Haruko Kato (m. 1958–div. 1973), then to Yachiyo Fujii (1974–1999), with whom he had a daughter, and finally to a woman 38 years his junior in 1999, whom he stayed married to until his death. In 1993, Takahashi was diagnosed with advanced esophageal cancer and underwent surgery to remove his entire esophagus, but he made a successful recovery and continued working into his later years. Takahashi died on January 16, 2014, at a hospital in Yamanashi Prefecture from respiratory failure at the age of 83.

== Selected filmography ==
- Ningen Gyorai Kaiten (1955) - debut
- Goke, Body Snatcher from Hell (1968) as Toshiyuki Saga, an astrobiologist
- Belladonna of Sadness (1973) as Milord (voice)
- Submersion of Japan (1973) as Professor Yamashiro
- Godzilla, Mothra and King Ghidorah: Giant Monsters All-Out Attack (2001) as an elderly bicycle shop owner
- Returner (2002) as Liu Laoban
- University of Laughs (2004) as a police officer
- Air Doll (2009) as Keiichi, former high school teacher
- Dear Doctor (2009)
- 1,778 Stories of Me and My Wife (2011)
- The Complex (2013) as Old Man Shinosaki
- R100 (2013) as a theatre audience member
