= Genocide (1968 film) =

- Theatrical release poster
- Directed by: Kazui Nihonmatsu
- Screenplay by: Susumu Takaku
- Story by: Kingen Amada
- Produced by: Tsuneo Kosumi
- Starring: Keisuke Sonoi; Yûsuke Kawazu; Emi Shindô
- Cinematography: Shizuo Hirase
- Edited by: Akimitsu Terada
- Music by: Shunsuke Kikuchi
- Production company: Shochiku
- Release date: November 9, 1968 (Japan)
- Running time: 84 minutes
- Country: Japan
- Language: Japanese

Genocide (Japanese: 昆虫大戦争, Hepburn: Konchu daisenso; lit. 'Great Insect War'), also known as War of the Insects, is a 1968 Japanese science fiction horror film directed by Kazui Nihonmatsu.

== Plot summary ==
The film opens with stock footage of an atomic blast and transitions to the Anan Archipelago, a fictional island group resembling the Ryukyo Islands. Here, Akiyama Joji is meant to be collecting rare insects for biologist Dr. Nagumo but is instead found with Annabelle, a blonde woman. Overhead, an American bomber plane carrying an H-bomb experiences an insect-induced flashback in one of its crew, Charly, causing a panic. The plane is soon engulfed by a massive swarm of insects, leading to a catastrophic crash with four parachutes spotted descending.

In the aftermath, a US Air Force search party is dispatched to recover the missing H-bomb, led by Lieutenant-Colonel Gordon. Meanwhile, on another island, Joji's wife, Yukari, fights off the advances of her employer, Kudo, while dealing with suspicions about Joji’s prolonged absence. The American search party finds Charly unconscious and discovers the dead bodies of the other airmen, marked by strange wounds. Joji, who had found a military-issue watch under an abandoned parachute and tried to sell it, is arrested and accused of the airmen’s deaths when the watch is traced back to the crash site.

Dr. Nagumo receives a plea for help from Yukari and arrives on the island to assist Joji. Nagumo's investigation reveals that the wounds on the airmen were caused by insect bites, but his claims are met with skepticism. Meanwhile, Annabelle is revealed to have a deep connection with the insects, driven by a traumatic past involving her family's torture during the war. She is also involved with "Eastern bloc" spies, planning to use the insects as a weapon.

Charly, tortured by the spies, confirms the existence of the H-bomb before being dumped back on the island, where he becomes a threat to Yukari and Junko, a local doctor. Charly's madness and subsequent death reveal more about the insects' deadly capabilities, including laying eggs in human tissue. As the situation escalates, Nagumo and his allies are captured by the spies and Annabelle, who reveals her ultimate plan to use the insects for global genocide.

In a final effort, Joji sacrifices himself to save Yukari from the attacking insects. Nagumo and the survivors attempt to evacuate the island, but the Americans, led by Gordon, plan to detonate the H-bomb to cover up the incident and eliminate the insect threat. Despite Nagumo’s desperate attempts to prevent the detonation, the film ends on a note of impending doom, questioning humanity's future and the destructive potential of scientific experimentation gone awry.

== Cast ==
- Keisuke Sonoi as Dr. Yoshito Nagumo
- Yûsuke Kawazu as Joji Akiyama
- Emi Shindo as Yukari Akiyama
- Reiko Hitomi as Junko Komura
- Eriko Sono as Nagumo’s assistant
- Kathy Horan as Annabelle (Japanese voice actor: Haruko Kitahama)
- Chico Roland as Charlie (Japanese voice actor: Kazuya Tatekabe)
- Ralph Jesser as Lieutenant Colonel Gordon (Japanese voice actor: Gorō Naya)
- Toshiyuki Ichimura as Seborey Kudo
- Tadayoshi Ueda as Tsuneo Matsunaga
- Hiroshi Aoyama as Toru Fujii
- Hideaki Komori as Yokoi
- Saburo Aonuma as Detective
- Mike Daneen as Aircraft Captain
- Franz Gruber as Doctor
- Harold S. Conway as Commander
- William Douyuak as Correspondent

== Production ==
Genocide was co-written by Susumu Takaku, an anime and live-action screenwriter. The films staff includes Shizuo Hirase as the cinematographer who also worked on the Shochiku films The X from Outer Space and Goké, Body Snatcher from Hell.

== Release ==
Genocide was released in Japan on 9 November 1968. It was released as a double feature with The Living Skeleton. The film was released in the United States by Shochiku Films of America in 1969. The film was promoted under the title War of the Insects on this release.

The Criterion Collection released Genocide on DVD in a compilation set titled When Horror Came to Shochiku through their Eclipse label. The box set was released on November 20, 2012.

== Reception ==
Slant Magazine described the film as "appropriately harrowing" and one where women "come under the most direct indictment". The review opined that Nihonmatsu "handles with considerably more skill than his prior Shochiku effort" and that "Genre films don't often cover as much ground stylistically or thematically as Genocide, let alone get more bleak (the film ultimately hinges on the potential detonation of a hydrogen bomb and the single mother who may have to single-handedly repopulate a country), but as the last horror film Shochiku would produce, it's suitably ambitious and apocalyptic in its finality." Sight & Sound described Genocide as an "accident of a film" that "plays mostly as a national symptom, in a legacy of scenarios devised both to make sense of, and to reduce to pulp the memories of nuclear heat-death".

== See also ==
- List of horror films of 1968
- List of Japanese films of 1968
- List of science fiction films of the 1960s
