= 1968 in Japan =

- Decades: 1940s; 1950s; 1960s; 1970s; 1980s
- See also: Other events of 1968; History of Japan • Timeline • Years

Events in the year 1968 in Japan.

== Incumbents ==
- Emperor: Hirohito
- Prime Minister: Eisaku Satō (Liberal Democratic)
- Chief Cabinet Secretary: Toshio Kimura until November 30, Shigeru Hori
- Chief Justice of the Supreme Court: Masatoshi Yokota
- President of the House of Representatives: Mitsujirō Ishii
- President of the House of Councillors: Yūzō Shigemune

=== Governors ===
- Aichi Prefecture: Mikine Kuwahara
- Akita Prefecture: Yūjirō Obata
- Aomori Prefecture: Shunkichi Takeuchi
- Chiba Prefecture: Taketo Tomonō
- Ehime Prefecture: Sadatake Hisamatsu
- Fukui Prefecture: Heidayū Nakagawa
- Fukuoka Prefecture: Hikaru Kamei
- Fukushima Prefecture: Morie Kimura
- Gifu Prefecture: Saburō Hirano
- Gunma Prefecture: Konroku Kanda
- Hiroshima Prefecture: Iduo Nagano
- Hokkaido: Kingo Machimura
- Hyogo Prefecture: Motohiko Kanai
- Ibaraki Prefecture: Nirō Iwakami
- Ishikawa Prefecture: Yōichi Nakanishi
- Iwate Prefecture: Tadashi Chida
- Kagawa Prefecture: Masanori Kaneko
- Kagoshima Prefecture: Saburō Kanemaru
- Kanagawa Prefecture: Bunwa Tsuda
- Kochi Prefecture: Masumi Mizobuchi
- Kumamoto Prefecture: Kōsaku Teramoto
- Kyoto Prefecture: Torazō Ninagawa
- Mie Prefecture: Satoru Tanaka
- Miyagi Prefecture: Shintaro Takahashi
- Miyazaki Prefecture: Hiroshi Kuroki
- Nagano Prefecture: Gon'ichirō Nishizawa
- Nagasaki Prefecture: Katsuya Sato
- Nara Prefecture: Ryozo Okuda
- Niigata Prefecture: Shiro Watari
- Oita Prefecture: Kaoru Kinoshita
- Okayama Prefecture: Takenori Kato
- Osaka Prefecture: Gisen Satō
- Saga Prefecture: Sunao Ikeda
- Saitama Prefecture: Hiroshi Kurihara
- Shiga Prefecture: Kinichiro Nozaki
- Shiname Prefecture: Choemon Tanabe
- Shizuoka Prefecture: Yūtarō Takeyama
- Tochigi Prefecture: Nobuo Yokokawa
- Tokushima Prefecture: Yasunobu Takeichi
- Tokyo: Ryōkichi Minobe
- Tottori Prefecture: Jirō Ishiba
- Toyama Prefecture: Minoru Yoshida
- Wakayama Prefecture: Masao Ohashi
- Yamagata Prefecture: Tōkichi Abiko
- Yamaguchi Prefecture: Masayuki Hashimoto
- Yamanashi Prefecture: Kunio Tanabe

== Events ==
- Japan at the 1968 Summer Olympics
- Japan at the 1968 Winter Olympics

=== January ===
- January 23 – Mushi (Osamu Tezuka) Production, as predecessor of Tezuka Production was founded.
- Unknown date: Komeda Coffeehouse, as known well coffeehouse chain in nationwide, founded in Nagoya.

=== February ===
- February 19: 1968–69 Japanese university protests sparked over a dispute within the University of Tokyo medical school.

=== March ===
- March 2: Fuji-Q Highland officially open in Fujiyoshida, Yamanashi Prefecture.

=== April ===
- April 1: 1968 Hyūga-nada earthquake
- April 1: Abukuma Express line opened
- April 12: Kasumigaseki Building opened, was the first modern office skyscraper and tallest building in Tokyo until 1970.
- April 15: Tōmei Expressway opened

=== May ===
- May 16: 1968 Tokachi earthquake

=== June ===
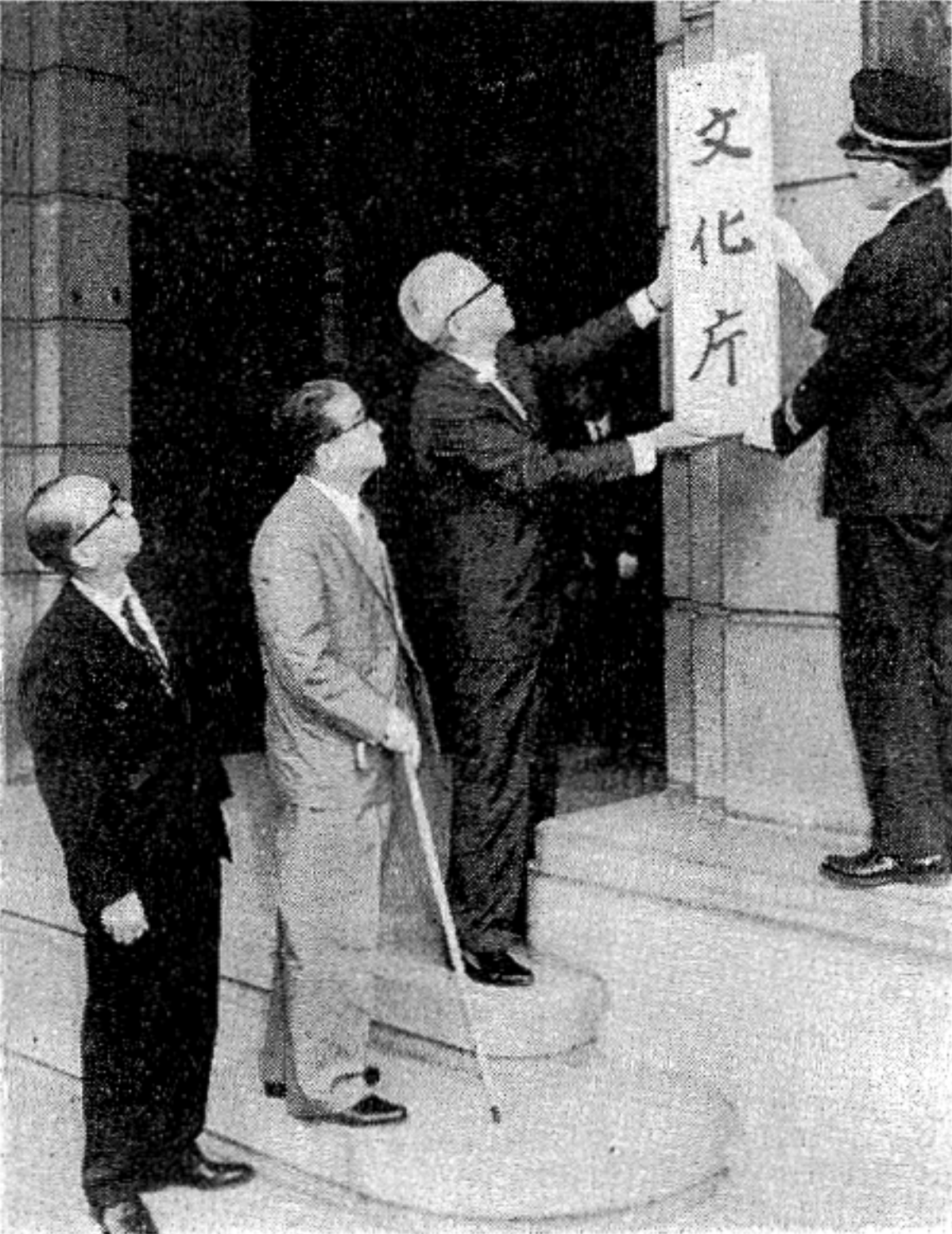
Minister of Education at the opening ceremony.

- June 15: Agency for Cultural Affairs established.
- June 16: Terrorist incident on the Yokosuka Line kills 1.
- June 26: Bonin Islands returned to Japan by United States Navy after 23-year occupation.

=== July ===
- July 1: Postal code system adopted in Japan.
- July 7: Shintaro Ishihara and others are elected to the House of Councillors.

=== August ===
- August 18: 1968 Hida river bus accident, two charter buses occur debris flow, following push into Hida River, Gifu Prefecture, due after heavy torrential rain. According to local official confirmed report, 104 people lost to lives with one of worst road accident in Northeast Asia.

=== October ===
- October: Golgo 13, which becomes the longest-running ongoing manga, makes its debut on Big Comic.
- October 21: New Left forces occupy Shinjuku Station for International Anti-War Day. Arrests are made.

=== November ===
- November 2: A resort hotel fire in Arima Spa, Kobe, Hyogo Prefecture, according to Fire and Disaster Management Agency official confirmed report, 30 person lost to lives, with 44 person wounded.

=== December ===
- December 10: 300 million yen robbery
- December 27: Toei Mita Line opened.

== Births ==
- January 1: Miki Higashino, pianist and composer
- January 22: Heath, musician (d. 2023)
- February 22: Kazuhiro Sasaki, former Japan professional and Major League Baseball pitcher
- April 1:
  - Masumi Kuwata, former professional baseball pitcher
  - Ryōta Takeda, politician
- April 11: Yōichi Okabayashi, former professional baseball pitcher
- April 29: Yoshiaki Koizumi, video game designer, director, producer, and business executive of Nintendo
- May 1: Akiko Kijimuta, former tennis player
- May 4: Momoko Kikuchi, actress and singer
- July 5: Ken Akamatsu, manga artist and politician
- November 12: Aya Hisakawa, voice actress
- November 25: Shingo Takatsu, professional baseball coach and former pitcher
- November 30: Rica Matsumoto, actress, voice actress, and singer
- December 25: Koichi Ogata, former baseball manager and player

== Deaths ==
- January 9: Kōkichi Tsuburaya, athlete (suicide) (b. 1940)
- January 29: Tsuguharu Foujita, painter (b. 1886)
- July 19: Kan Shimozawa, novelist (b. 1892)
- September 23: Kogo Noda, screenwriter (b. 1893)

== See also ==
- 1968 in Japanese television
- List of Japanese films of 1968
- 1968 in Japanese music
