= The X from Outer Space =

- Theatrical release poster
- Directed by: Kazui Nihonmatsu
- Screenplay by: Eibi Motomochi; Moriyoshi Ishida; Kazui Nihonmatsu
- Produced by: Wataru Nakajima
- Starring: Toshiya Wazaki; Itoko Harada; Shinichi Yanagisawa; Hiroshi Fujioka; Eiji Okada
- Cinematography: Shizuo Hirase; Sentura Okoshi
- Edited by: Yoshi Sugihara
- Music by: Taku Izumi
- Production company: Shochiku
- Release date: March 25, 1967 (Japan)
- Running time: 89 minutes
- Country: Japan
- Language: Japanese

The X from Outer Space (宇宙大怪獣ギララ, Uchū Daikaijū Girara; lit. 'Cosmic Giant Monster Guilala') is a 1967 Japanese science fiction kaiju film directed by Kazui Nihonmatsu, and stars Eiji Okada and Toshiya Wazaki.

Stock footage of the monster Guilala from the film was reused in the 2008 comedy film Monster X Strikes Back: Attack the G8 Summit.

== Plot ==
The spaceship AAB Gamma is dispatched from Japan to the planet Mars to investigate reports of UFOs seen near the Red Planet. When the spaceship arrives, it encounters one of the UFOs, which suddenly sprays the AAB Gamma with spores. A sample of the spores is returned to Earth, where one of them begins to develop.

The spore is accidentally exposed to acid, and grows into a giant creature that is named "Guilala". It continues to feed on any kind of energy source, and grows bigger and more powerful. The monster begins a reign of destruction through Tokyo. It spits fireballs, feeds on nuclear fuel, turns into a flaming orb to travel great distances by air in mere minutes, and destroys all aircraft and tanks in its path. Guilala is finally defeated by fighter jets laden with bombs, which coat it in a substance called "Guilalanium", a substance that prevents it from absorbing energy. This causes Guilala to shrink down to its original spore form. Stored in a glass container filled with Guilalanium, it is rendered permanently harmless. The government promptly launches it back into space, where it will orbit the Sun in a nigh-inescapable heliocentric orbit for the foreseeable future.

== Production ==
The X from Outer Space and Gappa: The Triphibian Monster by Nikkatsu were produced and released simultaneously by different companies. Both shared similarities in production systems, being produced by the company Japan Tokusatsu Production (Note: Japan Tokusatsu Production was founded by Eiji Tsuburaya's acquaintances such as Keiji Kawakami, Akira Watanabe, and Yukio Odagiri.) and involving Eiji Tsuburaya's teams. Both films were among the non-Daiei kaiju projects that received tax-based governmental loans (Note: Not all studios received the loans; Toho and Toei Company didn't use the service on purpose, and Ishihara International Productions and other independent production studios that were instead turned down for their managerial competences.) that resulted from the Daiei president and Gamera co-writer Masaichi Nagata's attempt to export Japanese films, especially of the kaiju and tokusatsu genres, for the purpose of attracting foreign currencies to revive the declining Japanese cinema. Both films became a part of the social phenomena First Kaiju Boom, which was formed through these governmental promotions.

Under the influence of the Six-Company Agreement (Five-Company Agreement), which was led by Masaichi Nagata, Tsuburaya's involvement in The X from Outer Space and Gappa: The Triphibian Monster wasn't publicly announced, although his participation was apparent to filmmakers.

== Cast ==
- Toshiya Wazaki as Captain K. Sano
- Itoko Harada as Michiko Taki
- Shinichi Yanagisawa as H. Miyamoto
- Eiji Okada as Dr. Katō
- Ryūji Kita as Emergency operations center chief
- Takanobu Hozumi as FAFC technical officer
- Noriyuki Watanabe as FAFC operator
- Jun Kashima as FAFC operator
- Peggy Neal as Lisa Schneider (Japanese voice actor: Reiko Mutō)
- Franz Gruber as Dr. Berman (Japanese voice actor: Tamio Ōki)
- Mike Daneen as Dr. Stein (Japanese voice actor: Teiji Ōmiya)
- Keisuke Sonoi as Dr. M. Shioda
- Torahiko Hamada as Mr. Kimura
- Hiroshi Fujioka as Moon base worker
- Sōnosuke Oda as Moon base worker
- Kōji Nakata as Commissioner General of the National Police Agency
- Kamon Kawamura as Electrical substation worker
- Eizō Kaimai as Guilala

== Release ==
The X From Outer Space was released in Japan on 25 March 1967. The film was never released theatrically in the United States, but instead was released directly to television in 1968 by American International Television.

The Criterion Collection released The X from Outer Space on DVD through their Eclipse label in a boxed set entitled When Horror Came to Shochiku (which also includes Goké, Body Snatcher from Hell, The Living Skeleton and Genocide). This DVD set offers both an English subtitled and a dubbed version of the film. This boxed set was released on November 20, 2012.

== Reception ==
Film historian Chuck Stephens described the film as having "a well-deserved reputation as one of the silliest and, as a consequence, most beloved rubber-suit monster movies ever made". Sight & Sound described the film as a "harebrained kaiju epic" that was "Cheesy, rich in comic non sequiturs and scored with an unpredictable mishmash of 1960s pop and bossa nova. X fits comfortably into one's stoned best-bad-movie rental evening". Author and film critic Glenn Erickson characterized the film as "simply... terrible," describing the monster as "a preposterous concoction, [being] a 20-story chicken with a head shaped like a jet plane." Writing for Turner Classic Movies, critic Nathaniel Thompson wrote that the film "offers a substantial amount of entertainment value (and unintentional humor), thanks to its dual menaces of a gloppy space entity and a rampaging chicken monster," and included a "jaw-dropping and vaguely pornographic dispatching of the beast at the end."

== Legacy ==
There existed unsuccessful film remake attempts in the 1990s. Among the revivals of Godzilla and Gamera, Shochiku launched a Guilala project by appointing Kazuyuki Izutsu and Shinichi Ichikawa, however the project was terminated during the process of evaluation. Shortly after, Kazuyoshi Okuyama proposed Keita Amemiya to direct a remake after the completion of Moon Over Tao: Makaraga (1997). Following Amemiya's resignation, Okuyama attempted to continue the project by appointing another director, yet the Guilala reboot faced another cancellation. Consequently, Monster X Strikes Back: Attack the G8 Summit (2008) was produced about a decade after.

Several Shochiku-related projects have utilized stock footages and props of the 1967 film, and had introduced cameo appearances of the kaiju Guilala, such as in The Bad News Bears Go to Japan (1978), Tora-san's Forbidden Love (1984), and Boys Be Ambitious (1996) by aforementioned Kazuyuki Izutsu. Guilala was also used as a mascot by the amusement park Kamakura Cinema World, which was located within the Shochiku Ōfuna Studio. With the release of the 2008 remake, its director Minoru Kawasaki produced a specialized Den Ace installment to feature The X from Outer Space, and Guilala appeared in a television commercial by the American staffing agency Ladders, Inc.

Guilala has also been featured and referenced among other mediums, such as boy's and manga magazines in the Showa era, the popular manga series KochiKame: Tokyo Beat Cops,, Natsuhiko Kyogoku's novel series USO Makoto Yōkai Hyaku Monogatari, and so on.

== See also ==
- Gappa: The Triphibian Monster
- List of Japanese films of 1967
- List of science fiction films of the 1960s
