= Masumi Okada =

Japanese actor (1935–2006)

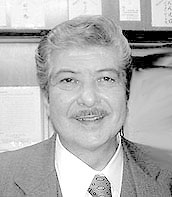
- Born: Otto Sevaldsen; September 22, 1935; Nice, Provence-Alpes-Côte d'Azur, France
- Died: May 29, 2006 (aged 70); Tokyo, Japan
- Other name: 'Fanfan'
- Education: Saint Joseph College, Yokohama
- Occupations: Actor; producer; singer; comedian; television personality
- Spouses: Mamako Yoneyama; Midori Fujita; Keiko Yarita
- Children: 4
- Relatives: Eline Eriksen (aunt)

Japanese name
- Kanji: 岡田眞澄
- Hiragana: おかだ ますみ
- Katakana: オカダ マスミ
Transcriptions
- Romanization: Okada Masumi

Masumi Okada (岡田眞澄, Okada Masumi; born Otto Sevaldsen; September 22, 1935 – May 29, 2006) was a French-born Japanese actor, tarento, and film producer.

== Early life ==
Okada was born in Nice, France, to a Japanese father and a Danish mother. His father, Minoru Okada, was an artist and his mother, Ingeborg Sevaldsen, was the sister of Eline Eriksen, the model for the "Mermaid of Copenhagen". He had an elder brother, Taibi Okada, who later became a tarento under the stage name 'E.H. Eric." French law at the time meant that Okada was initially registered under his Western name - Otto Sevaldsen. He was raised in a multilingual environment, fluent in French, Japanese, and (later) English.

The elder Okada was an associate of Chaïm Soutine who moved to Nice from Paris, and was oft patronized by Kunio Kishida. Masumi Okada spent his early childhood in La Gaude until 1939. Due to the outbreak of World War II, Okada's father took the family to Japanese Taiwan, and Okada attended school in Taipei for a time. However, his father was pursued relentlessly by the Kempeitai, and his mother could not bear it any longer and left Japan.

After the war, Okada moved to a housing complex for repatriates in Akasaka, Tokyo. As 'Otto Sevaldsen', he attended Saint Joseph International School (SJIS) in Yokohama, graduating in 1952.

== Career ==
In 1952, while still a student at SJIS, Okada debuted as an actor in a musical at the Nichigeki Music Hall. He signed with Nikkatsu Corporation in 1954, appearing in his first film, "Hatsukoi Kanariya Musume"/"Canary Girl's First Love", the following year.

In 1956, Okada was cast as the bandmaster in Takumi Furukawa and Shintaro Ishihara's "Taiyo no Kisetsu"/"Season of the Sun". This performance led to his appearance in the companion film, "Kurutta Kajitsu"/"Crazed Fruit" (1956), in which he played the cool, laid-back, finger-snapping Amerasian, "Frank Hirosawa", the unofficial leader of a band of young "rebels without a cause". Okada allegedly stole every scene in which he appeared.

In a career which spanned more than five decades, Okada went on to appear in over 140 films. A talented and versatile entertainer, he was also active on stage and television. His credits include all genres in the three media—from stage musicals to horror films, from comedies to historicals to tragedies, and from Shakespeare to science-fiction.

Okada's mixed ethnicity and proficiency in Japanese, English and French enabled him to portray a wide range of characters, in roles as diverse as "Count Dracula" in "The Vampire Dracula Comes To Kobe" (1979) to "Brother Michael" in James Clavell's "Shogun" (1980). He acted as the French physicist, "Dr. Jules Masson", in Ishiro Honda's "Latitude Zero"/"Ido Zero Daisakusen"/"Atragon II" (1969). In the film, "Marco" (1973), he was the Chinese ambassador, "Ti Wai". In "Bye-Bye, Jupiter"/"Sayonara, Jupiter" (1984), he was cast as "Dr. Mohammed Mansur", and in "Getting Any?" (1994) -- a comedy with "Beat" Takeshi Kitano—Okada made a cameo appearance as the Russian leader, Joseph Vissarionovich Stalin. Okada's film credits also included "Arashi wo yobu otoko"/"Man Who Causes a Storm" (1957), "Akai hatoba"/"Red Quay" (1958), "Ankoku no Ryoken"/"Passport to Darkness" (1959), "Yoru no nagare"/"Evening Storm" (1960), "Oneechan wa tsuiteru ze"/"Anything Goes Three Dolls' Way" (1960), "Kyuketsu Dokurosen"/"Living Skeleton" (1968), "Moeru Tairiku"/"The Blazing Continent" (1968), "Isoge! Wakamono: Tomorrow Never Waits"/"Hurry, Young Ones! Tomorrow Never Waits" (1974), "Hishu monogatari"/"A Tale of Sorrow and Sadness" (1977), "Fuku no hana"/"Winter's Flower" (1978), "Umi to dokuyaku"/"The Sea and Poison" (1986), "CF Garu"/"Commercial Film Girl" (1989), "The Hunted" (1995), "Izo" (2004) and "Shiberia Chotokkyu 5"/"Siberia Express 5" (2005).

Okada's other contributions to the film industry include his role as a producer for both "Battle Royale" (2000) and "Battle Royale II: Requiem" (2003), as well as "Chichan wa sokyu no muko" (date of release: January 19, 2008). He was also the executive producer of "Blue" (2002), a critically acclaimed film about the relationship between two schoolgirls involved in a lesbian crush.

Okada's stage credits include the Toho musicals, in which he starred after leaving Nikkatsu Corporation, as well as the French musical, "La Cage aux Folles", which ran for over 400 performances. In 2001, he appeared as the French philosopher and writer, Voltaire, in a Japanese-language version of the operetta, "Candide", by Leonard Bernstein, the composer of "West Side Story" (1957).

Okada also founded the theater company, Gekidan Keyaki, in Japan.

In 1962, Okada appeared in NHK's "Wakai Kisetsu". In 1966, Masumi Okada was cast as the newspaper reporter, "Ito Mura" in Osamu Tezuka's television series, "The Space Giants" (aka "Ambassador Magma", "Space Avenger" and "Monsters From Outer Space"), produced by P Productions and directed by Hidehito Ueda. Okada also starred in the 1980s series, "Miracle Girl", a Japanese television detective drama, and the 1998 series, "Nemureru Mori"/"A Sleeping Forest". In the Tunnels' 1988 parody, "Kamen Norida", Okada played Joker's "Colonel Fanfan". Okada's performances were not restricted to Japanese audiences. "The Space Giants", "Latitude Zero", "Marco", "Shogun" and "The Hunted" were some of his credits which became international hits, and brought him into contact with actors such as Joseph Cotten, Richard Jaeckel and Cesar Romero ("Latitude Zero"), Desi Arnaz Jr. and Zero Mostel ("Marco"), Richard Chamberlain and John Rhys-Davies ("Shogun") and Christopher Lambert ("The Hunted").

Okada was a regular judge in the "Iron Chef" series, and the host-presenter for many Japanese variety and game shows, including NTV's celebrity quiz show, "Sarujie". In "Sarujie", he wore a monkey suit and make-up, in line with the theme of the show -- "saru" translates into "monkey", and, "jie"/"chie", "wit", the term "sarujie" meaning "shallow cunning". Okada was a Master of Ceremonies, and was the emcee for many beauty pageants held in Japan. For over two decades, he served as the host-presenter for The International Beauty Pageant, popularly known as the Miss International contest. Tall (5 ft. 11 3/4 inches / 1.82 metres), good-looking, charming, charismatic, suave and witty, with his affectionate personality and magnetism, he could always liven up a show, regardless of its audience and the other participants in the show. Again, his ability to speak fluent Japanese, English and French proved to be an asset, as were his powerful, deep and sensuous vocals.

Masumi Okada was appointed as one of Japan's Ambassadors to the Hans Christian Andersen 2005 bicentenary, a list of events organized in celebration of the nineteenth-century Danish author's life and works. Okada said of Andersen: "To the future Andersen: Why? Why? Why? There were many "whys" during my childhood. And although the years have passed there are still many things I do not understand, but that makes life fascinating. The passion of asking "why" is called "curiosity". I have heard that Andersen's father read many stories to Andersen when he was a child. A book is a magical thing, and once you turn the pages, you can travel and experience many things. For example, you can fly, talk to flowers and animals, and even live under water. I am sure that Andersen's inspiration and his eternal message of "Love, Courage, Hope and Dream" grew from his father's storytelling. Anyone who harbours the curiosity to read books is himself a potential future Andersen."

Masumi Okada devoted his entire life to the entertainment industry and never retired from show business. In June 2005, he was diagnosed with throat (esophageal) cancer, and underwent surgery. Less than three months later, he was again in front of the cameras, hosting the Miss International 2005 beauty pageant in Tokyo, although his fatigue surfaced towards the end of the show when he apparently read out the names of the top 12 contestants—Miss Venezuela, Miss Philippines, Miss Brazil, Miss Japan, Miss Dominican Republic, Miss Colombia, Miss Turkey, Miss Finland, Miss France, Miss Ukraine, Miss Peru and Miss Serbia and Montenegro—in the space of 20 seconds. Nevertheless, the show was a huge success, with wide media coverage.

== Personal life ==
Okada was married three times. In 1960, he announced his two-year "contractual marriage" to the renowned dancer and mime choreographer, Mamako Yoneyama—a union which ended even before the first year was over. Okada then remained single for over a decade; in 1972, he married Japanese actress Midori Fujita, with whom he had three sons, the eldest of whom, Yoshihiro Okada Makoto, is currently an actor and DJ in Japan. 22 years later, Okada divorced Fujita, and, in 1995, at the age of 60 years, he took his third wife, Keiko Yarita, a 34-year-old flight stewardess, who gave him his fourth child, a daughter named Tomomi, in 1998 who later become Miss International Japan 2019.

The turn of the millennium brought two tragic deaths in Okada's life. In 2000, his elder brother, Taibi, died of Parkinson's Disease in Sprecklesville, Maui Island, Hawaii. Then, on July 27, 2004, Okada's third son with Fujita was found hanged at his mother's home in the Denenchofu suburb of Tokyo. Shocked, Okada did not attend his son's private funeral the following day, but called a press conference a month later to refute allegations by the Shuukan Josei magazine that there had been bad blood between him and his 26-year-old son, who was an assistant stage designer with a theater company prior to his suicide. Okada said at the press conference, "I don't know why. It's been hard ....... and so sad when the child dies before the parent."

Okada was affectionately known by the fan nickname Fanfan (ファンファン).

=== Death ===
Okada suffered a relapse of his malignancy and was re-hospitalized, but succumbed to his illness at a Tokyo hospital on May 29, 2006.

== Selected filmography ==
- Hatsukoi kanariya musume (1955) – Shinkichi
- Midori harukani (1955) – Prince of Moon
- Haru no yo no dekigoto (1955) – Tomio (Tommy)
- Ginza 24 chou (1955) – Mineo Akaishi
- Taiyo no kisetsu (1956) – Bandmaster
- Crazed Fruit (1956) – Hirosawa Frank
- Hungry Soul, Part II (1956)
- Gyûnyû ya Furankî (1956)
- Okinawa no Tami (1956)
- Otemba san'nin shimai: Odoru taiyô (1957) – Tetsuo Izumi
- Watashi wa zenkamono de aru (1957)
- Madamu (1957)
- Nikutai no hankô (1957) – Billy
- Sun in the Last Days of the Shogunate (幕末太陽伝 Bakumatsu taiyōden) (1957) – Kisuke
- Frankie Bûchan no zoku aa gunkaki: Nyogo ga-shima funsenki (1957)
- Arashi wo Yobu Otoko (1957) – Shinsuke, Miyako's brother
- Tokyo yaro to onna-domo (1958)
- Yoru no kiba (1958) – Santa, a pickpocket
- Yogiri no dai-ni kokudô (1958) – Sidney Oka
- Shundeini (1958) – Kenkichi Hiranuma
- Haneda hatsu 7 ji 50 pun (1958) – Shinji Baba
- Akai hatoba (1958) – Taabô
- Kanzenna yûgi (1958) – Kazu Tomita
- Akai lamp no shûressha (1958) – Nakamura kun
- Kanzen na asobî (1958)
- Chî no gâmpeki (1958)
- Kurutta datsugoku (1959) – Kunio Iwakami
- Kenjû 0 gô (1959) – Eric
- Ankoku no ryoken (1959)
- Dynamite ni hi o tsukero (1959) – Jirô Sugi
- Uwaki no kisetsu (1959)
- Kaze no aru michi (1959) – Hideo Mayama
- Umi no wanâ (1959)
- Nirenjû no tetsu (1959)
- Hatoba no muho mono (1959)
- Fudôtoku kyôiku kôza (1959) – Tatsuya Oka
- Kyanpasu hyakutoban: Yori gakusei yaro to masume tachi (1960)
- Roku-san-sei gurentai (1960) – Jumpei Kanzaki
- Datô – Knock Down (1960) – Gorô Nakahara
- Ore wa ginza no ki e itai (1960) – McLane
- Yoru no nagare (1960) – English Teacher
- Tenka no Kaidanji Tosshin Tarô (1960)
- Nankai no noroshi (1960) – Tsujii
- Oneechan wa tsuiteru ze (1960) – Yasuo Taki
- Kuchibue ga nagareru minato machi (1960)
- Taiheiyo no katsugiboshi (1961) – Andy Shirai
- Kigeki: Tonkatsu ichidai (1963) – Marius
- Palembang kishû sakusen (1963)
- Kyojin Ôkuma Shigenobu (1963) – Satô
- Hibari, Chiemi, Izumi: Sannin yoreba (1964)
- Niji o tsukamu koibito tachi (1965)
- Yoake no uta (1965) – Nogami
- Shichinin no yajû (1967, part 1, 2)
- Kimi wa koibito (1967)
- Nippon ichi no otoko no naka no otoko (1967) – Toshio Okamoto
- Toshigoro (1968) – Yoshiharu Kokura
- The Living Skeleton (1968) – Father(Akashi) / Tanuma
- Moeru tairiku (1968) – Kenneth
- Latitude Zero (1969) – Dr. Jules Masson
- Shin Abashiri Bangaichi: Fubuki no Hagure Okami (1970)
- Marco (1973) – Ti Wai
- Isoge! Wakamono (1974) – Nakahara
- A Tale of Sorrow and Sadness (1977)
- Fuyu no Hana (1978) – Shinkichi Mie
- Ashita no Jô 2 (1981) – Jose Mendosa (voice)
- Kagi (1983)
- Bye-Bye Jupiter (1984) – Dr. Mohammed Mansur
- Tokei – Adieu l'hiver (1986)
- The Sea and Poison (1986) – Hattori
- Umi e, See You (1988)
- Kaitō Ruby (1988)
- CF gâru (1989) – Kumazwa
- Peesuke: Gatapishi monogatari (1990)
- Jingi (1991)
- Itsuka dokokade (1992)
- Getting Any? (1995, cameo appearance) – Stalin
- The Hunted (1995) – Lt. Wadakura
- Ai Suru (1997) – Professor
- Hakuchi (1999) – Head manager
- Siberian Express 5 (2003)
- IZO (2004)
- Shiberia Chôtokkyû 5 (2005) – Pietro Yoshida
- Damejin (2006)
- Waru: kanketsu-hen (2006) – (final film role)

=== Dubbing ===
- Dracula (Count Dracula (Frank Langella))
