= Kikko Matsuoka =

Japanese actress (born 1947)

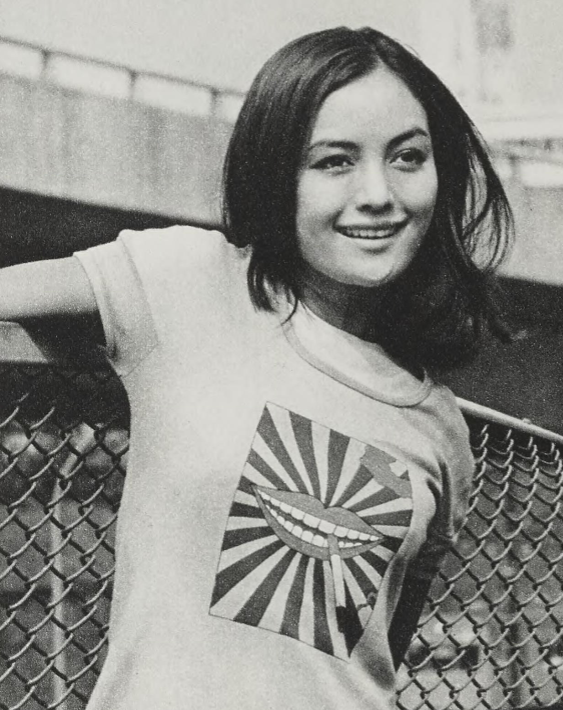
- Kikko (1967)
- Born: Kikuko Matsuoka; February 11, 1947 (age 78)
- Occupation: Actress
- Spouse: Hayato Tani

Kikko Matsuoka (松岡 きっこ, Matsuoka Kikko; born February 11, 1947) is a Japanese actress. Her real name is Kikuko Matsuoka (松岡 紀公子, Matsuoka Kikuko).

== Career ==
Starting as a child actress, Matsuoka made her film debut in 1957 with Daiei Film's Tokyo hanzai chizu. Appearing in several dozen films, including the horror film The Living Skeleton (Kyūketsu dokuro sen), she was also a gravure idol in the late 1960s. She was even seen in the 1967 James Bond film You Only Live Twice as a diver girl, but was uncredited. Also working on television, she appeared in over thirty television dramas, including recurring roles on hit shows like Key Hunter and The Guardman. She was also a regular on landmark variety shows like Kyosen Maetake gebageba 90-pun. Arguably her most memorable work on television was as a weekly co-host for over ten years on the late night news show 11PM, which itself lasted for over twenty years.

It was during her television work that she met the actor Hayato Tani; they announced their engagement in 1978 and married in 1981. The couple have appeared in many Japanese television programs together, including the hit gameshow Takeshi's Castle, where Matsuoka guest starred by encouraging her husband, General Tani, not to give up.

In 1971, Matsuoka recorded the album '25 Ji' for Teichiku records (catalogue number SL 1324) in Japan. The same year, the album was released in Taiwan on Tailee records in a slightly different cover (catalogue number TLA 1214). The album features orchestrated music over which Matsuoka delivers hushed spoken word vocals and interludes. In 2021, Teichiku re-released the album (catalogue number TEA 13). Original 1971 copies are very hard to find and valuable.

== Selected filmography ==
- Bushido, Samurai Saga (1963)
- You Only Live Twice (1967)
- Black Lizard (1968)
- The Living Skeleton (1968)
- Black Rose Mansion (1969)
- Nemuri Kyōshirō manji giri (1969)
