= Kazui Nihonmatsu =

Japanese film director (born 1922)

- 二本松 嘉瑞
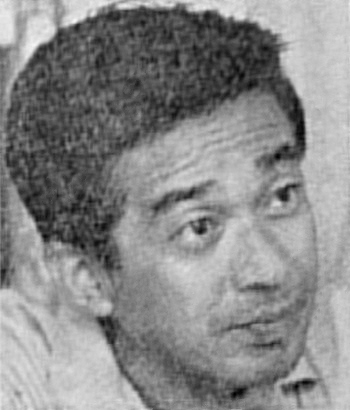
- Born: Yoshimitsu Nihonmatsu; 9 April 1922; Kamakura, Japan
- Died: before 2001
- Occupation(s): Assistant director, director, screenwriter
- Years active: 1951–1968

Kazui Nihonmatsu (二本松 嘉瑞, Nihonmatsu Yoshimitsu) (born 9 April 1922, date of death unknown) was a Japanese film director.

== Biography ==
After graduating in Business at the Waseda University, Nihonmatsu was hired at the Shochiku Ofuna Photographic Office in 1948 and later became assistant director to filmmakers such as Akira Kurosawa, Keisuke Kinoshita and more often to Masaki Kobayashi.

As a director, Nihonmatsu directed two kaiju films: The X from Outer Space and Genocide, both produced by Shochiku, at its first experiences producing J-Horror films.

Nihonmatsu died prior to 2001.

== Filmography ==
=== Assistant director ===
- Carmen Comes Home (1951, directed by Keisuke Kinoshita)
- The Idiot (1951, directed by Akira Kurosawa)
- Youth of the Son (1952, directed by Masaki Kobayashi)
- Sincere Heart (1953, directed by Masaki Kobayashi)
- The Thick-Walled Room (1956, directed by Masaki Kobayashi)
- The Inheritance (1962, directed by Masaki Kobayashi)

=== Director ===
- The X from Outer Space (1967, also screenwriter)
- Genocide (1968)
