= List of Japanese films of 1966 =

A list of films released in Japan in 1966 (see 1966 in film).

== List of films ==
Japanese films released in 1966
Title	Japanese Title	Release date	Director	Cast	Genre	Notes
	追跡	1966.__.__	Hiroshi Manabe			
	幻日	1966.__.__	Tetsuji Takechi			
	艶夢	1966.__.__	Kan Mukai			
	密通	1966.__.__	Kōji Wakamatsu			
Young Boss: The Ambush	若親分喧嘩状	1966.01.01	Kazuo Ikehiro		Yakuza	
	だかれて泣け	1966.01.__	Isao Tsukimori			
	鏡の秘事	1966.01.__	Takeo Takagi			
	処女遍歴	1966.01.__	Yoshiyuki Murakami			
	女で銭を抱け	1966.01.__	Masanao Sakao			
	女王蜂の欲望	1966.01.__	Kinya Ogawa			
	女肌	1966.01.__	Seiji Kai			
	情事の餌	1966.01.__	日森功			
	真夜中のあがき	1966.01.__	Shinya Yamamoto			
	人妻の予定日	1966.01.__	Kan Mukai			
	赤い肌影	1966.01.__	Jirō Tsurumaki			
	狙われた女達	1966.01.__	Ario Takeda			
	肉体の河	1966.01.__				
	浅草の踊り子 濡れた素肌	1966.01.__	Mamoru Watanabe			
	番頭お色け日記	1966.01.__	Shō Fujita			
	不良女学生	1966.01.__	Jirō Tsurumaki			
	未亡人日記	1966.01.__	Kensuke Sawa			
	裸の復讐	1966.01.__	Takeo Takagi, Haruo Matsubara			
	裸身	1966.01.__				
	爛熟	1966.01.__	Seiichi Fukuda			
New Yakuza Soldier	新・兵隊やくざ	1966.01.03	Tokuzō Tanaka		Yakuza	
The Boss of Pick-Pocket Bay	無責任清水港	1966.01.03	Takashi Tsuboshima	Hitoshi Ueki, Kei Tani, Hajime Hana	Jidai-geki parody	
Shacho gyojoki	社長行状記	1966.01.03	Shue Matsubayashi	Hisaya Morishige, Asami Kuji, Hirokazu Matsumura		
Flower and Dragon 2: Duel at Dokai Bay	続花と龍 洞海湾の決斗	1966.01.13	Kōsaku Yamashita		Yakuza	
Brutal Tales of Chivalry 2: The Chinese Lion and Peony Tattoo	昭和残侠伝 唐獅子牡丹	1966.01.13	Kiyoshi Saeki		Yakuza	
	源氏物語	1966.01.14	Tetsuji Takechi		Jidai-geki	
Crest of a Man: Dragon and Tiger Cruelty	男の紋章 竜虎無情	1966.01.14	Akinori Matsuo		Yakuza	
	五匹の紳士	1966.01.15	Hideo Gosha			
The Spider Tattoo	刺青	1966.01.15	Yasuzō Masumura		Jidai-geki	
Yabure Shomon	破れ証文	1966.01.15	Shigeo Tanaka			
	望郷と掟	1966.01.15	Yoshitarō Nomura			
Kigeki Ekimae benten	喜劇 駅前弁天	1966.01.15	Kozo Saeki	Hisaya Morishige, Junzaburo Ban, Frankie Sakai	Comedy	
Rise Against the Sword	暴れ豪右衛門	1966.01.15	Hiroshi Inagaki	Toshiro Mifune, Nobuko Otowa, Makoto Sato	Jidai-geki	
The Thin Line	女の中にいる他人	1966.01.25	Mikio Naruse	Keiju Kobayashi, Michiyo Aratama, Tatsuya Mihashi		
Seventeen Ninja: The Great Battle	十七人の忍者 大血戦	1966.01.26	Motohiro Torii		Jidai-geki / Ninja	
Kobanzame Oyakusha Jingi	小判鮫 お役者仁義	1966.01.26	Tadashi Sawashima		Jidai-geki	
	この虹の消える時にも	1966.01.27	Kenjirō Morinaga			
	黒い賭博師 悪魔の左手	1966.01.27	Kō Nakahira			
The Virgin Witness	処女が見た	1966.01.29	Kenji Misumi		Jidai-geki	
	復讐の切り札	1966.01.29	Shunkai Mizuho			
	つれこみ	1966.02.__	Hiroshi Uchida			
	もだえの夜	1966.02.__	Tetsurō Yamaguchi			
	やくざ処女	1966.02.__	Seiji Kai		Yakuza	
	悪女日記	1966.02.__	Kan Mukai			
	官能の虜	1966.02.__	Seishirō Kanzaki			
	獣の欲望	1966.02.__	Taizō Nanbu			
	処女無情	1966.02.__	Hiroya Nakano			
	初めての感触	1966.02.__	Osamu Yamashita			
	女・三百六十五夜	1966.02.__	Takeo Takagi, Jirō Karasawa			
	女の狂宴	1966.02.__	Mamoru Watanabe			
	女の秘密	1966.02.__	Yasuyoshi Ogura			
	砂の穴 情事のからくり	1966.02.__	Kinnosuke Fukada			
	制服の絶叫	1966.02.__	Giichi Nishihara			
	足入れ	1966.02.__	Hiroya Nakano			
	体当りマンハント旅行	1966.02.__	Fumihiro Ito			
	肉体の階段	1966.02.__	Fumi Matsui			
	肌が知っている	1966.02.__	Fumio Kurokawa			
	浮気契約	1966.02.__	Ichirō Kyōdō			
	夜まで待てない	1966.02.__	Saburō Kyōdō			
	猟奇の果て	1966.02.__				
The Heart of the Mountain	こころの山脈	1966.02.02	Kozaburo Yoshimura	Hisano Yamaoka, Jukichi Uno, Kazuko Yoshiyuki		
Chilvarous Story of Japan: Blood Fight at Kanda Festival	日本侠客伝 血斗神田祭り	1966.02.03	Masahiro Makino		Yakuza	
	夜の牝犬	1966.02.03	Shinji Murayama		Yakuza	
	愛して愛して愛しちゃったのよ	1966.02.05	Motomu Ida			
	火の太鼓	1966.02.05	Kazuo Hase			
	侠勇の花道 ドス	1966.02.05	Hiroki Matsuno			
Carmen from Kawachi	河内カルメン	1966.02.05	Seijun Suzuki	Yumiko Nogawa, Ruriko Ito, Chikaco Miyagi		
	われら人間家族	1966.02.11	勝目貫久			
Silence Has No Wings	とべない沈黙	1966.02.11	Kazuo Kuroki	Mariko Kaga, Minoru Hiranaka, Shoichi Ozawa		
	ザ・ガードマン 東京忍者部隊	1966.02.12	Tarō Yuge			
The Dragon's Fangs	鉄火場仁義	1966.02.12	Motomu Ida			
Shinobi no Mono 7: Mist Saizo Strikes Back	忍びの者 新・霧隠才蔵	1966.02.12	Kazuo Mori		Jidai-geki / Ninja	
Black Tight Killers	俺にさわると危ないぜ	1966.02.12	Yasuharu Hasebe	Akira Kobayashi, Chieko Matsubara, Mieko Nishio	Gendai-geki / Ninja	
Onna wa ikuman aritotemo	女は幾万ありとても	1966.02.12	Toshio Sugie	Akira Takarada, Tadao Takashima, Yu Fujiki		
Odoshi	脅迫（おどし）	1966.02.17	Kinji Fukasaku			
	四畳半物語 娼婦しの	1966.02.17	Masashige Narusawa			
	顔を貸せ	1966.02.19	Namio Yuasa			
	黒幕	1966.02.19	Satoru Kobayashi			
	あばずれ	1966.02.25	Yūsuke Watanabe		Drama	
	大空に乾杯	1966.02.25	Buichi Saitō			
	二人の世界	1966.02.25	Akinori Matsuo			
Showa Saidai no Kaoyaku	昭和最大の顔役	1966.02.25	Kiyoshi Saeki		Yakuza	
5 Gents on the Spot	続社長行状記	1966.02.25	Shue Matsubayashi	Hisaya Morishige, Frankie Sakai, Keiju Kobayashi		
The Sword of Doom	大菩薩峠	1966.02.25	Kihachi Okamoto	Tatsuya Nakadai, Yūzō Kayama, Michiyo Aratama	Jidai-geki	
	銭のとれる男	1966.02.26	Tetsutarō Murano			
The Thieves' Who's Who	泥棒番付	1966.02.26	Kazuo Ikehiro		Jidai-geki	
	うまず女	1966.03.__	Mamoru Watanabe			
	しびれる歓び	1966.03.__	小角高治			
	よろめき	1966.03.__	Kiyoshi Ishiyama			
	一夜妻	1966.03.__	Shinya Yamamoto			
	求愛体操	1966.03.__	Hajime Okada			
	泣かされた女	1966.03.__	Osamu Yamashita			
	狂った欲求	1966.03.__	Ryōsuke Kurahashi			
	血は太陽よりも赤い	1966.03.__	Kōji Wakamatsu			
	合鍵の女	1966.03.__	Saburō Kyōdō			
	熟したつぼみ	1966.03.__	Shin Murakami			
	処女非情	1966.03.__				
	人妻がもえるとき	1966.03.__	遠藤由希夫			
	雪肌の情熱	1966.03.__	Jirō Tsurumaki			
	多情	1966.03.__	Yasuyoshi Ogura			
	昼と夜の顔	1966.03.__	Kōe Shindō			
	白痴女	1966.03.__	武市芽良夫			
	魔性の人妻	1966.03.__	Takeo Takagi, Haruo Matsubara			
	未婚のひめごと	1966.03.__	Kinnosuke Fukada			
	毛	1966.03.__	Kiyoshi Komori			
	夜ひらく花	1966.03.__	Takeo Takagi			
	乱れた夜	1966.03.__	石山堅			
	乱れ花	1966.03.__				
	嵐の女体	1966.03.__	Kinya Ogawa			
	炎と掟	1966.03.05	Umetsugu Inoue			
	血と涙と墓場	1966.03.05	Sōichi Ōya			
	日本ゼロ地帯 夜を狙え	1966.03.05	Teruo Ishii			
Hatamoto Yakuza	旗本やくざ	1966.03.10	Sadao Nakajima		Jidai-geki	
Nyobon Hakai	女犯破戒	1966.03.10	Eiichi Kudō		Jidai-geki	
Bad Reputation's Cherry Tree	悪名桜	1966.03.12	Tokuzō Tanaka		Yakuza	
Cat Girl Gamblers: Abandoned Fangs of Triumph	賭場の牝猫 捨身の勝負	1966.03.12	Haruyasu Noguchi		Yakuza	
Sleepy Eyes of Death: The Mask of the Princess	眠狂四郎多情剣	1966.03.12	Akira Inoue		Jidai-geki	
The Pornographers	エロ事師たちより 人類学入門	1966.03.12	Shohei Imamura	Shoichi Ozawa, Sumiko Sakamoto, Masaomi Kondo		
Izuko eo	何処へ	1966.03.16	Kozo Saeki	Yūzō Kayama, Yuriko Hoshi, Junko Ikeuchi		
Nippon ichi no gorigan otoko	日本一のゴリガン男	1966.03.16	Kengo Furusawa	Hitoshi Ueki, Kunie Tanaka, Mie Hama		
	運が良けりゃ	1966.03.19	Yōji Yamada			
	日本大侠客	1966.03.19	Masahiro Makino		Yakuza	
	非行少女ヨーコ	1966.03.19	Yasuo Furuhata			
	涙の連絡船	1966.03.19	Hideo Sakurai			
	わが愛星を祈りて	1966.03.26	Kōji Shima			
	氷点	1966.03.26	Satsuo Yamamoto			
	哀愁の夜	1966.03.27	Katsumi Nishikawa			
	青春ア・ゴーゴー	1966.03.27	Kenjirō Morinaga			
	われらの友情	1966.04.01	Yūzō Satō			
	愛欲	1966.04.01	Junya Satō			
Kutsukake Tokijiro: The Lonely Yakuza	沓掛時次郎 遊侠一匹	1966.04.01	Tai Katō		Jidai-geki	
	春一番	1966.04.01	Hirokazu Ichimura			
	お電話頂戴	1966.04.__	Kōji Wakamatsu			
	くずれる女	1966.04.__	Takashi Chiba			
	我慢できない	1966.04.__	Shintarō Kishi			
	狂った女神	1966.04.__	Shinya Yamamoto			
	玉ころがし	1966.04.__	Kiyoshi Komori			
	穴場	1966.04.__	Kinya Ogawa			
	婚前交渉	1966.04.__	Shinya Yamamoto			
	十七才の体験	1966.04.__	小角高治			
	女の中の性	1966.04.__				
	女子学生が見た	1966.04.__	Kei Miyaguchi			
	女体標本	1966.04.__	Akitaka Kimata			
	色ざんまい	1966.04.__	Takeo Takagi			
	赤い渦	1966.04.__	Taizō Nanbu			
	続・情事の履歴書	1966.04.__	Kan Mukai			
	軟派	1966.04.__	Hiroshi Uchida			
	肉の鎖	1966.04.__	Takeo Takagi			
	乳房日記	1966.04.__	Saburō Kyōdō			
	熱い渇き	1966.04.__	Saburō Kyōdō			
Night in Bangkok	バンコックの夜	1966.04.03	Yasuki Chiba	Yūzō Kayama, Chang Mei-Yao, Yuriko Hoshi		Japanese-Taiwanese-Hong Kong co-production
Wakai musume ga ippai	若い娘がいっぱい	1966.04.03	Masanori Kakei	Mie Hama, Yuki Nakagawa, Nami Tamura		
	ほんだら捕物帖	1966.04.09	Kazuo Mori			
Zoku Teppo Inu	続鉄砲犬	1966.04.09	Mitsuo Murayama			
Japanese Chivalrous Story: The Bloodstained Challenge	日本仁侠伝 血祭り喧嘩状	1966.04.10	Toshio Masuda		Yakuza	
Tokyo Drifter	東京流れ者	1966.04.10	Seijun Suzuki	Tetsuya Watari, Chieko Matsubara, Hideaki Nitani	Yakuza	
Patriotism	憂国	1966.04.12	Yukio Mishima, Domoto Masaki	Yukio Mishima, Yoshiko Tsuruoka		
	ゴキブリ部隊	1966.04.13	Mikio Koyama			
The Protector	のれん一代 女侠	1966.04.13	Tadashi Sawashima			
	雨の中の二人	1966.04.16	Hideo Sakurai			
	男の魂	1966.04.16	Meijirō Umetsu			
Moment of Terror	ひき逃げ	1966.04.16	Mikio Naruse	Hideko Takamine, Yoko Tsukasa, Eitaro Ozawa	Drama-thriller	
Tanuki no osama	狸の王様	1966.04.16	Kajiro Yamamoto	Keiju Kobayashi, Reiko Dan, Mitsuko Kusabue		
Daimajin	大魔神	1966.04.17	Kimiyoshi Yasuda	Miwa Takada, Yoshihiko Aoyama, Jun Fujimaki	Jidai-geki / Tokusatsu	
Gamera vs. Barugon	大怪獣決闘 ガメラ対バルゴン	1966.04.17	Shigeo Tanaka	Kyoko Enami, Kojiro Hongo, Akira Natsuki	Kaiju	
Honor Among Brothers	兄弟仁義	1966.04.23	Kōsaku Yamashita		Yakuza	
Abashiri Prison: Duel in the Wilderness	網走番外地 荒野の対決	1966.04.23	Teruo Ishii		Yakuza	
	青春のお通り 愛して泣いて突っ走れ	1966.04.27	Buichi Saitō			
	青春大統領	1966.04.27	Mio Ezaki			
	喜劇 駅前漫画	1966.04.28	Kōzō Saeki			
Adventures of Takla Makan	奇巌城の冒険	1966.04.28	Senkichi Taniguchi	Toshiro Mifune, Mie Hama, Tadao Nakamaru	Historical fantasy	
	暖流	1966.04.29	Yoshitarō Nomura			
	天下の快男児	1966.04.29	Kazuo Hase		Drama	
	のたうち	1966.05.__	Mamoru Watanabe			
	ひき裂かれた情事	1966.05.__	Kōji Wakamatsu			
	やわ肌ざんげ	1966.05.__	Jirō Tsurumaki			
	危険な同棲	1966.05.__	Hiroya Nakano			
	処女の絶叫	1966.05.__	Osamu Yamashita			
	初夜ふたたび	1966.05.__	小林大平			
	女の玩具	1966.05.__	Isao Tsukimori			
	情炎の報酬	1966.05.__	Kinnosuke Fukada			
	寝がえり	1966.05.__	Seiichi Fukuda			
	新妻のあやまち	1966.05.__	Fumihiro Ito			
	青い体臭	1966.05.__	Saburō Kyōdō			
	多情日記	1966.05.__	Toshiya Fujita			
	二股かける女	1966.05.__	Kan Mukai			
	燃える肌	1966.05.__	Giichi Nishihara			
Kanto Yakuza Arashi	関東やくざ嵐	1966.05.03	Shigehiro Ozawa		Yakuza	
The Young Boss Enters	若親分乗り込む	1966.05.03	Akira Inoue		Yakuza	
	続・おんな番外地	1966.05.03	Michio Konishi			
Zatoichi's Vengeance	座頭市の歌が聞える	1966.05.03	Tokuzō Tanaka	Shintarō Katsu	Jidai-geki / Chambara	
	帰ってきた狼	1966.05.11	Shōgorō Nishimura			
	太陽が大好き	1966.05.11	Mitsuo Wakasugi			
	青春の言葉より 風にきけ雲にきけ	1966.05.14	Mamoru Miyazaki			
	東京無宿	1966.05.14	Namio Yuasa			
	魚群アフリカを行く	1966.05.15	Minoru Tanaka			
Yakuza Gurentai	893愚連隊	1966.05.15	Sadao Nakajima		Yakuza	
Yukyo Sandai	遊侠三代	1966.05.15	Shinji Murayama			
Omedeto Hironomiya-sama	おめでとう浩宮さま	1966.05.15			Documentary short	
Orinpikku Tokyo taikai-Seki no kando	東京オリンピック 世紀の感動	1966.05.15	Nobumasa Kawamoto		Documentary	
	赤いグラス	1966.05.18	Kō Nakahira			
	涙になりたい	1966.05.18	Kenjirō Morinaga			
	姫路城	1966.05.21	Kōzō Ueno			
	雁	1966.05.21	Kazuo Ikehiro			
	空いっぱいの涙	1966.05.21	Junzō Mizukawa			
	三等兵親分	1966.05.21	Masaharu Segawa			
The Secret of the Urn	丹下左膳 飛燕居合斬り	1966.05.21	Hideo Gosha		Jidai-geki	
	野菊のごとき君なりき	1966.05.21	Sōkichi Tomimoto			
It Started in the Alps	アルプスの若大将	1966.05.28	Kengo Furusawa	Yūzō Kayama, Yuriko Hoshi, Kunie Tanaka		
The Man from Planet Alpha	クレージーだよ 奇想天外	1966.05.28	Takashi Tsuboshima	Kei Tani, Makoto Fujita, Hitoshi Ueki		
	逢いたくて逢いたくて	1966.06.01	Mio Ezaki			
	夜霧の慕情	1966.06.01	Akinori Matsuo			
	あまい唇	1966.06.__	Takashi Chiba			
	悪僧	1966.06.__	Kan Mukai			
	悪徳医 産婦人科日記	1966.06.__	Seiichi Fukuda			
	汚辱の女	1966.06.__	Takeo Takagi, Shintarō Kishi			
	危険な戯れ	1966.06.__	Namio Yuasa			
	花と蛇より 骨まで縛れ	1966.06.__	Takeo Takagi			
	私は見られた	1966.06.__	Kiyoshi Komori			
	女が指を咬むとき	1966.06.__	Fumihiro Ito			
	女の奥	1966.06.__	Takeo Takagi			
	女高生地帯	1966.06.__	Ario Takeda			
	女豹一番勝負	1966.06.__	Kinnosuke Fukada			
	情事の報酬	1966.06.__	常田一郎			
	色ぼけ	1966.06.__	Haruo Matsubara			
	新・妾	1966.06.__	Hiroya Nakano			
	肉体の会話	1966.06.__	久我光			
	浮気虫	1966.06.__	Osamu Yamashita			
	欲望の異常者	1966.06.__	Kinya Ogawa			
	日本を叱る シャッター0	1966.06.02	Taijirō Tamura, Hirotatsu Fujiwara, Yukio Sugiura			
	ド根性大将	1966.06.02	Michiyoshi Doi			
	友を送る歌	1966.06.02	Katsumi Nishikawa			
	カミカゼ野郎 真昼の決斗	1966.06.04	Kinji Fukasaku			
	酔いどれ博士	1966.06.04	Kenji Misumi			
	地獄の野良犬	1966.06.04	Ryūichi Takamori		Yakuza	
Nakano Spy School	陸軍中野学校	1966.06.04	Yasuzō Masumura			
	日本のさけます	1966.06.11	Tadashi Inaba			
	紀ノ川 花の巻 文緒の巻	1966.06.11	Noboru Nakamura			
	悪童	1966.06.12	Yūsuke Watanabe			
	骨までしゃぶる	1966.06.12	Tai Katō			
Japanese Chivalrous Story: The Yakuza of Flowers	日本仁侠伝 花の渡世人	1966.06.15	Haruyasu Noguchi		Yakuza	
	放浪のうた	1966.06.15	Takashi Nomura			
Tairiku Nagaremono	大陸流れ者	1966.06.19	Kōsaku Yamashita			
	夜の青春シリーズ 赤い夜行虫	1966.06.19	Shinji Murayama		Yakuza	
	殿方御用心	1966.06.22	Shigeru Doi			
	複雑な彼	1966.06.22	Kōji Shima			
Jajauma narashi	じゃじゃ馬ならし	1966.06.22	Toshio Sugie	Tadao Takashima, Junko Ikeuchi, Mie Hama		
	風車のある街	1966.06.25	Kenjirō Morinaga			
Rakugo yaro-Daidassen	落語野郎 大脱線	1966.06.30	Toshio Sugie	Yonemaru Katsura, Danshi Tatekawa, Shinji Maki		
Shin • Jiken kisha - Daitokai no wana	新・事件記者 大都会の罠	1966.06.30	Kazuo Inoue	Tomoo Nagai, Keisuke Sonoi, Aiichi Yamada		
Otoko no Shobu	男の勝負	1966.07.01	Sadao Nakajima		Yakuza	
	熱い血の男	1966.07.01	Meijirō Umetsu			
	艶やかな夢	1966.07.__	Kan Mukai			
	新拷問刑罰史 拷問	1966.07.__	Kiyoshi Komori			
	臭	1966.07.__	Minoru Ariyoshi			
	女のふくらみ	1966.07.__	Jirō Tsurumaki			
	女学生のあやまち	1966.07.__	Shinya Yamamoto			
	女高生のふるえ	1966.07.__	Takashi Yokoi			
	妾と狆	1966.07.__	Mitsugu Hamamura			
	情婦	1966.07.__	Akitaka Kimata			
	絶品の女	1966.07.__	Mamoru Watanabe			
	胎児が密猟する時	1966.07.__	Kōji Wakamatsu			
	半処女	1966.07.__	Kōji Seki			
	“非公開”の激情	1966.07.__	小角高治			
	非行少女の群れ	1966.07.__	Namio Yuasa			
	不純な快楽	1966.07.__	Hiroya Nakano			
	乱気流の悶え	1966.07.__	Ario Takeda			
	白の人造美女	1966.07.__	Kōji Wakamatsu			
Terror Beneath the Sea	海底大戦争	1966.07.01	Hajime Satō	Shin'ichi Chiba, Peggy Neal, Franz Gruber		
	処刑の島	1966.07.02	Masahiro Shinoda			
The Betrayal	大殺陣 雄呂血	1966.07.02	Tokuzō Tanaka		Jidai-geki	
	骨まで愛して	1966.07.09	Buichi Saitō			
	大悪党作戦	1966.07.09	Teruo Ishii			
Seven Gamblers	博徒七人	1966.07.09	Shigehiro Ozawa		Yakuza	
	夜のバラを消せ	1966.07.09	Toshio Masuda			
Brutal Tales of Chivalry 3: The Lone Wolf	昭和残侠伝 一匹狼	1966.07.09	Kiyoshi Saeki		Yakuza	
	貴様と俺	1966.07.13	Tarō Yuge			
Yakuza Soldier: Escape	兵隊やくざ 脱獄	1966.07.13	Kazuo Mori		Yakuza	
The Mad Atlantic	怒濤一万浬	1966.07.13	Jun Fukuda	Toshiro Mifune, Tatsuya Mihashi, Makoto Sato		
Zero • Faitaa-Daikusen	ゼロ・ファイター 大空戦	1966.07.13	Shiro Moritani	Yūzō Kayama, Makoto Sato, Tatsuyoshi Ehara		
History of a Man's Face	男の顔は履歴書	1966.07.15	Tai Katō			
	白昼の通り魔	1966.07.15	Nagisa Ōshima			
The Face of Another	他人の顔	1966.07.15	Hiroshi Teshigahara	Tatsuya Nakadai, Machiko Kyō		
	なかよし合奏団	1966.07.21	Iwao Setō		Drama	
Watari, The Ninja Boy	大忍術映画 ワタリ	1966.07.21	Sadao Funadoko		Jidai-geki / Tokusatsu / Ninja	
Cyborg 009	サイボーグ009	1966.07.21	Yugo Serikawa			Animated film
	冷凍魚	1966.07.30	菅家陣彦			
	おはなはん	1966.07.30	Yoshitarō Nomura			
	愛の手紙は幾歳月	1966.07.30	Sōkichi Tomimoto			
	私、違っているかしら	1966.07.30	Akinori Matsuo			
	私は負けない	1966.07.30	Akira Inoue			
	涙くんさようなら	1966.07.30	Shōgorō Nishimura			
	恋と涙の太陽	1966.07.30	Umetsugu Inoue			
Jyanguru taite	ジャングル大帝	1966.07.31	Eiichi Yamamoto			Animated film
Tsuru no ongaeshi	つるのおんがえし	1966.07.31	Kazuhiko Watanabe			Animated short film
The War of the Gargantuas	フランケンシュタインの怪獣	1966.07.31	Ishirō Honda	Russ Tamblyn, Kumi Mizuno, Kenji Sahara	Kaiju	
	あなたの留守に？	1966.08.__	Kinya Ogawa			
	もだえ花	1966.08.__	石山堅			
	わなの喘ぎ	1966.08.__	Ichirō Kyōdō			
	愛欲の果て	1966.08.__	Giichi Nishihara			
	餌	1966.08.__	Kan Mukai			
	甘い体臭	1966.08.__	Satoru Kobayashi			
	偽れる性	1966.08.__	Kōhei Shimamura			
	泣き濡れた処女	1966.08.__	Ryō Hida			
	蛇淫の肌	1966.08.__	Takeo Takagi			
	女子大生の抵抗	1966.08.__	Mamoru Watanabe			
	色なさけ	1966.08.__	Takeo Takagi			
	真赤な砂	1966.08.__	Kinnosuke Fukada			
	生娘	1966.08.__	Shinya Yamamoto			
	肌香の熱風	1966.08.__	Kōe Shindō			
	未知のセックス	1966.08.__	Osamu Yamashita			
	夜行性人種	1966.08.__				
	あなたの命	1966.08.13	Buichi Saitō			
	スチャラカ社員	1966.08.13	Yōichi Maeda			
	帰らざる波止場	1966.08.13	Mio Ezaki			
Honor Among Brothers 2	続兄弟仁義	1966.08.13	Kōsaku Yamashita		Yakuza	
Return of Giant Majin	大魔神怒る	1966.08.13	Kenji Misumi		Jidai-geki / Tokusatsu	
	坊っちゃん	1966.08.13	Hirokazu Ichimura			
Abashiri Prison: Duel in the South	網走番外地 南国の対決	1966.08.13	Teruo Ishii		Yakuza	
Zatoichi's Pilgrimage	座頭市海を渡る	1966.08.13	Kazuo Ikehiro	Shintaro Katsu, Michiyo Yasuda, Takahiko Tono	Jidai-geki / Chambara	
Big Wind at the Spa	喜劇 駅前番頭	1966.08.14	Kozo Saeki	Hisaya Morishige, Junzaburo Ban, Frankie Sakai		
Tenamonya Tokaido	てなもんや東海道	1966.08.14	Shue Matsubayashi	Makoto Fujita, Hajime Hana, Kei Tani		
	男度胸で勝負する	1966.08.26	Shinji Murayama			
Nippon Ankokugai	日本暗黒街	1966.08.26	Masaharu Segawa		Yakuza	
	遙かなる慕情 星のフラメンコ	1966.08.26	Kenjirō Morinaga			
	女のみづうみ	1966.08.27	Yoshishige Yoshida			
	本能	1966.08.27	Kaneto Shindō			
3 Biki no tanuki	3匹の狸	1966.08.31	Hideo Suzuki	Junzaburo Ban, Akira Takarada, Shoichi Ozawa		
Shin • Jiken kisha - Satsui no oka	新・事件記者 殺意の丘	1966.08.31	Kazuo Inoue	Tomoo Nagai, Keisuke Sonoi, Aiichi Yamada		
	テクニック	1966.09.__	Osamu Yamashita			
	ぬすまれた官能	1966.09.__	Akira Igarashi			
	炎の女	1966.09.__	Giichi Nishihara			
	甘い吐息	1966.09.__	Takeo Takagi			
	激痛	1966.09.__	Kiyoshi Komori			
	私は玩具ではない	1966.09.__	Shigeru Aoyama			
	十七才の体臭	1966.09.__	小角高治			
	情炎	1966.09.__	Kan Mukai			
	情事の渓谷	1966.09.__	Ario Takeda			
	乳房の週末	1966.09.__	Ryō Hida			
	悲器	1966.09.__	Namio Yuasa			
	夜の日記	1966.09.__	Kinya Ogawa			
	夜は憎い	1966.09.__	Namio Yuasa			
	脂のしたたり	1966.09.03	Tokuzō Tanaka			
Young Boss 5	若親分あばれ飛車	1966.09.03	Shigeo Tanaka		Yakuza	
	殺るかやられるか	1966.09.07	Takashi Nomura			
	三匹の牝猫	1966.09.07	Motomu Ida			
Black Ninja	まぼろし黒頭巾 闇に飛ぶ影	1966.09.08	Junji Kurata		Jidai-geki / Ninja	
	一万三千人の容疑者	1966.09.08	Hideo Sekikawa		Drama	
	太陽に突っ走れ	1966.09.08	Ryūichi Takamori			
Nichigeki [Kayama Yuzo sho] yori–utau wakadaisho	日劇「加山雄三ショー」より 歌う若大将	1966.09.10	長野卓	Yūzō Kayama, Takio Shima, The Launchers	Concert film	
Panchi yaro	パンチ野郎	1966.09.10	Katsumi Iwauchi	Toshio Kurosawa, Yuriko Hoshi, Ryu Wakuta		
	横堀川	1966.09.15	Hideo Ōba			
	汐風の中の二人	1966.09.15	Hideo Sakurai			
	愛と死の記録	1966.09.17	Koreyoshi Kurahara			
	可愛いくて凄い女	1966.09.17	Michio Konishi			
	絶唱	1966.09.17	Katsumi Nishikawa			
	続・酔いどれ博士	1966.09.17	Akira Inoue			
	日本の翼	1966.09.17	武田敦			
Chilvarous Story of Japan: Duel at Kaminari Gate	日本侠客伝 雷門の決斗	1966.09.17	Masahiro Makino		Yakuza	
Nakano Spy School: Cloud Number One Directive	陸軍中野学校 雲一号指令	1966.09.17	Kazuo Mori			
Bride of the Andes	アンデスの花嫁	1966.09.23	Susumu Hani	Sachiko Hidari, Ancermo Fukuda, Kōji Takahashi		
	かあちゃんと11人の子ども	1966.10.01	Heinosuke Gosho			
Kyokaku Sangokushi Sadogashima no Ketto	侠客三国志 佐渡ケ島の決斗	1966.10.01	Kiyoshi Saeki			
	殺人者	1966.10.01	Kimiyoshi Yasuda			
	三等兵親分出陣	1966.10.01	Mikio Koyama			
	赤い天使	1966.10.01	Yasuzō Masumura			
	沈丁花	1966.10.01	Yasuki Chiba			
	おはなはん 第二部	1966.10.01	Yoshitarō Nomura			
	異常な体験	1966.10.__	Kan Mukai			
	禁じられた乳房	1966.10.__	Kinya Ogawa			
	結婚より同棲	1966.10.__				
	黒い痴情	1966.10.__	Ryō Hida			
	指にかける女	1966.10.__	Giichi Nishihara			
	柔肌の掟	1966.10.__	Haruo Matsubara			
	女の砦	1966.10.__	Kan Kataoka			
	女道楽	1966.10.__	Osamu Yamashita			
	女郎妻	1966.10.__	Takeo Takagi			
	人妻の秘密	1966.10.__	Shinya Yamamoto			
	赤い情事	1966.10.__	Seiichi Fukuda			
	肌に泣く女	1966.10.__	Haruo Matsubara			
	非情の罠	1966.10.__	小角浩			
Once a Rainy Day	あこがれ	1966.10.01	Hideo Onchi	Michiyo Aratama, Yoko Naito, Ryo Tamura		
	栄光への挑戦	1966.10.08	Toshio Masuda			
	不敵なあいつ	1966.10.08	Shōgorō Nishimura			
	「空の起点」より 女は復讐する	1966.10.15	Kazuo Hase			
	阿片台地 地獄部隊突撃せよ	1966.10.15	Tai Katō			
Shiroi Kyotō	白い巨塔	1966.10.15	Satsuo Yamamoto	Jiro Tamiya, Eijirō Tōno, Takahiro Tamura		
Ninkyo Happo Yabure	仁侠八方破れ	1966.10.22	Motomu Ida		Yakuza	
Kigeki Aogeba totoshi	喜劇 仰げば尊し	1966.10.22	Minoru Shibuya	Hisaya Morishige, Ai Sasaki, Etsuko Ichihara	Comedy	
Swindler Meets Swindler	狸の休日	1966.10.22	Kajiro Yamamoto	Tadao Takashima, Ichiro Arishima, Mitsuko Kusabue	Comedy	
Hokkai no Abare Ryu	北海の暴れ竜	1966.10.25	Kinji Fukasaku			
Game of Chance	浪曲子守歌	1966.10.25	Ryūichi Takamori		Yakuza	
	フォークで行こう 銀嶺は恋してる	1966.10.26	Umetsugu Inoue			
Gontakure	ごんたくれ	1966.10.29	Tetsutarō Murano			
	さよなら列車	1966.10.29	Meijirō Umetsu			
	私は泣かない	1966.10.29	Kenji Yoshida			
	処女受胎	1966.10.29	Kōji Shima			
	白鳥	1966.10.29	Katsumi Nishikawa			
How to Win a Race	喜劇 駅前競馬	1966.10.29	Kozo Saeki	Hisaya Morishige, Junzaburo Ban, Frankie Sakai		
Kureeji daisakusen	クレージー大作戦	1966.10.29	Kengo Furusawa	Hitoshi Ueki, Hajime Hana, Kei Tani		
Jigoku no Okite ni Ashita Hanai	地獄の掟に明日はない	1966.10.30	Yasuo Furuhata			
Judo vs. Karate	任侠柔一代	1966.10.30	Sadao Nakajima		Yakuza	
	堕胎	1966.11.01	Masao Adachi			
	0線旅館	1966.11.__	Kan Kataoka			
	悪の愉しみ	1966.11.__	Ryōsuke Kurahashi			
	悪女志願	1966.11.__	Namio Yuasa			
	禁じられたテクニック	1966.11.__	Kan Mukai			
	禁じられた性	1966.11.__	Yoshitsugu Ōi			
	初体験	1966.11.__	Shinya Yamamoto			
	女と男の0地帯	1966.11.__	Satoru Kobayashi			
	女の破局	1966.11.__	Ryō Hida			
	女の反応	1966.11.__	Satoru Kobayashi			
	女教師の秘密	1966.11.__	Akitaka Kimata			
	女高生ジャングル	1966.11.__	Mamoru Watanabe			
	情怨の砂漠	1966.11.__	Takaya Ōuchi			
	随喜の涙	1966.11.__	Kiyoshi Komori			
	肉色	1966.11.__	Ryō Hida			
	裏窓の情事	1966.11.__	Shigeru Aoyama			
	猟奇	1966.11.__	Shintarō Kishi			
	媚薬の罠	1966.11.__	Kōji Seki			
	処女？戦慄	1966.11.__	Ichirō Kyōdō			
Tokyo Drifter: Love the Color of the Crimson Sea	続・東京流れ者 海は真っ赤な恋の色	1966.11.09	Kenjirō Morinaga		Yakuza	
Yakuza Soldier: Great Escape	兵隊やくざ 大脱走	1966.11.09	Tokuzō Tanaka		Yakuza	
Sleepy Eyes of Death: Sword of Villainy	眠狂四郎無頼剣	1966.11.09	Kenji Misumi		Jidai-geki	
Fighting Elegy	けんかえれじい	1966.11.09	Seijun Suzuki	Hideki Takahashi		
	展覧会の絵	1966.11.11	Nobuo Ōnuki, Takateru Miwa, Shingo Matsuo, Taku Sugiyama, Shunsaku Ban			
	なつかしい風来坊	1966.11.12	Yōji Yamada			
Blazing Sword	土方歳三 燃えよ剣	1966.11.12	Hirokazu Ichimura		Jidai-geki	
	海に生きる	1966.11.13	Zensuke Ōshima		Drama	
	湖の琴	1966.11.13	Tomotaka Tasaka			
Otazune Mono Shichinin	お尋ね者七人	1966.11.19	Shigehiro Ozawa			
Samurai Wolf	牙狼之介	1966.11.19	Hideo Gosha		Jidai-geki	
	暗黒航路	1966.11.20	Takashi Nomura			
Shin Yukyo-Den	新遊侠伝	1966.11.20	Buichi Saitō		Yakuza	
Come Marry Me	お嫁においで	1966.11.20	Ishirō Honda	Yūzō Kayama, Yoko Naito, Keiko Sawai		
Fuji-san Chokkakko	富士山直滑降	1966.11.20		Yuichiro Miura	Documentary	
Rakugo yaro-Obaka jidai	落語野郎 大馬鹿時代	1966.11.20	Toshio Sugie	Yonemaru Katsura, Danshi Tatekawa, Shinji Maki		
Woman Gambler	女の賭場	1966.11.26	Shigeo Tanaka		Yakuza	
	命果てる日まで	1966.11.26	Yoshitarō Nomura			
	野良犬	1966.11.26	Yoshio Inoue			
	恋する年ごろ	1966.11.26	Mamoru Miyazaki			
	0番地の女	1966.12.__	Kiyoshi Komori			
	かよい妻	1966.12.__	Kan Mukai			
	価値ある女	1966.12.__	Osamu Yamashita			
	快楽のうず潮	1966.12.__	Takaya Ōuchi			
	学生妻	1966.12.__	Kan Mukai			
	狂った挑発	1966.12.__	Namio Yuasa			
	結婚詐欺	1966.12.__	Seiichi Fukuda			
	処女生態	1966.12.__	Kiyoshi Komori			
	情事の末路	1966.12.__				
	痴情の診断書	1966.12.__	新藤高守			
	虹の乳房	1966.12.__	Shinya Yamamoto			
	美しき悪女	1966.12.__	Giichi Nishihara			
	おゆきさん	1966.12.03	Noboru Kaji			
	ボスは俺の拳銃で	1966.12.03	Shinji Murayama			
	五泊六日	1966.12.03	Yūsuke Watanabe			
Big Wind from Tokyo	石中先生行状記	1966.12.07	Seiji Maruyama	Akira Takrada, Toshio Kurosawa, Keiko Sawai		
	アジア秘密警察	1966.12.10	Akinori Matsuo			
	そっくり大逆転	1966.12.10	Michiyoshi Doi			
Shinobi no Mono 8: Three Enemies	新書・忍びの者	1966.12.10	Kazuo Ikehiro		Jidai-geki / Ninja	
	日本一のマジメ人間	1966.12.10	Hiroki Matsuno			
	嵐を呼ぶ男	1966.12.10	Toshio Masuda			
Return of Daimajin	大魔神逆襲	1966.12.10	Kazuo Mori	Hideki Ninomiya, Masahide Kizuka, Shinji Hori	Jidai-geki / Tokusatsu	
Golden Ninja	冒険大活劇 黄金の盗賊	1966.12.13	Tadashi Sawashima		Jidai-geki / Ninja	
	裏切りの季節	1966.12.13	Atsushi Yamatoya, Kōji Wakamatsu			
Ebirah, Horror of the Deep	ゴジラ・エビラ・モスラ 南海の大決闘	1966.12.17	Jun Fukuda	Akira Takarada, Kumi Mizuno		
Korega seishun da!	これが青春だ！	1966.12.17	Takeshi Matsumori	Yosuke Natsuki, Yoko Fujiyama, Reiko Dan		
	黄金バット	1966.12.21	Hajime Satō			
The Magic Serpent	怪竜大決戦	1966.12.21	Tetsuya Yamauchi	Hiroki Matsukata, Tomoko Ogawa, Rytaro Otomo	Jidai-geki / Tokusatsu / Ninja	
	神火101 殺しの用心棒	1966.12.23	Teruo Ishii			
	出獄の盃	1966.12.24	Umetsugu Inoue			
	傷だらけの天使	1966.12.24	Kenji Yoshida			
	小さい逃亡者	1966.12.24	Teinosuke Kinugasa, Eduard Bocharov			
	酔いどれ波止場	1966.12.24	Akira Inoue			
	男の顔は切札	1966.12.24	Masahiro Makino			
	逃亡列車	1966.12.24	Mio Ezaki			
Honor Among Brothers 3	兄弟仁義 関東三兄弟	1966.12.30	Kōsaku Yamashita		Yakuza	
Abashiri Prison: Duel in the Snow	網走番外地 大雪原の対決	1966.12.30	Teruo Ishii		Yakuza	
	鳥獣戯画	1966.12.31	Yasuo Matsukawa			
	伝統工芸 －技と人－	1966.12.31	Kōzō Ueno			

== See also ==
- 1966 in Japan
- 1966 in Japanese television
