= List of Japanese films of 1965 =

A list of films released in Japan in 1965 (see 1965 in film).

== Box-office ranking ==
Rank	Title	Director	Cast	Box office
1	Red Beard	Akira Kurosawa	Toshiro Mifune	¥3.6 hundred million
2	Abashiri Prison 4	Teruo Ishii	Ken Takakura	¥2.9 hundred million
3	Kantō Hatashijō	Shigehiro Ozawa	Kōji Tsuruta	¥2.5 hundred million
4	Abashiri Prison 3	Teruo Ishii	Ken Takakura	¥2.4 hundred million
5	Nihon Kyōkaku den 3	Masahiro Makino	Ken Takakura	¥2.4 hundred million

== List of films ==
Japanese films released in 1965
Title	Japanese Title	Release date	Director	Cast	Genre	Notes
	堅々獄夫婦庭訓	1965.__.__	Tadanori Yokoo			
	女体110番	1965.__.__	南博邦			
	愛のデザイン	1965.__.__	Kōji Wakamatsu			
	血と肉と罪と	1965.__.__	Kinnosuke Fukada			
	棘ある愛撫	1965.__.__	Jirō Tsurumaki			
	鉛の慕情	1965.__.__	Kōji Wakamatsu			
	ただれた愛欲	1965.01.__	Taizō Nanbu			
	やめてくれ	1965.01.__	Haruhiko Kawamura			
	乾いた舗道	1965.01.__	Kōe Shindō			
	禁じられた遠い道	1965.01.__	Namio Yuasa			
	雌牝	1965.01.__	Kinya Ogawa			
	女の悶え	1965.01.__	Takeo Takagi			
	色じかけ	1965.01.__	Taizō Nanbu			
	色と欲	1965.01.__	Takahide Shindō			
	赤い肌の門	1965.01.__	Kan Kataoka			
	離婚屋開業中	1965.01.__	Kōji Wakamatsu			
	歪んだ裸形	1965.01.__	Kinya Ogawa			
Kaoyaku	顔役	1965.01.03	Teruo Ishii			
Five Gents Ninja Trick Book	社長忍法帖	1965.01.03	Shūe Matsubayashi		Comedy	
	大根と人参	1965.01.03	Minoru Shibuya			
Lord Tokugawa Ieyasu	徳川家康	1965.01.03	伊藤大輔		Jidai-geki	
	涙にさようならを	1965.01.03	Yōichi Maeda			
Samurai Assassin	侍	1965.01.03	Kihachi Okamoto	Toshiro Mifune, Keiju Kobayashi, Michiyo Aratama	Jidai-geki	
Kwaidan	怪談	1965.01.06	Masaki Kobayashi	Rentarō Mikuni, Keiko Kishi, Kazuo Nakamura	Jidai-geki	
	ごろつき犬	1965.01.13	Tetsutarō Murano			
Sleepy Eyes of Death: Sword of Fire	眠狂四郎炎情剣	1965.01.13	Kenji Misumi		Jidai-geki	
	あねといもうと	1965.01.15	Yoshirō Kawazu			
	あの雲に歌おう	1965.01.15	Kōji Ōta		Drama	
	いも侍 抜打ち御免	1965.01.15	Hiroki Matsuno			
Hunger Straits	飢餓海峡	1965.01.15	Tomu Uchida			
	拳銃無頼 流れ者の群れ	1965.01.15	Haruyasu Noguchi			
	大日本ハッタリ伝	1965.01.15	Ren Yoshimura			
Kigeki Ekimae iin	喜劇 駅前医院	1965.01.15	Kozo Saeki	Hisaya Morishige, Junzaburo Ban, Frankie Sakai	Comedy	
None But the Brave	勇者のみ	1965.01.15	Frank Sinatra	Frank Sinatra, Tatsuya Mihashi, Takeshi Kato	War	Japanese-American co-production
	花実のない森	1965.01.23	Sōkichi Tomimoto			
Suruga Pleasure Quarter: Violent Courage	駿河遊侠伝 度胸がらす	1965.01.23	Kazuo Mori	Shintaro Katsu, Yukiko Fuji, Miyuki Kuwano	Jidai-geki	
	40年大相撲初場所 前半戦	1965.01.24	Torahiko Ise [composition]			
	愛しながらの別れ	1965.01.24	Mio Ezaki			
	花咲く乙女たち	1965.01.24	Nozomu Yanase			
	この声なき叫び	1965.01.30	Hirokazu Ichimura			
	ひも	1965.01.30	Hideo Sekikawa		Yakuza	
Chilvarous Story of Japan: Episode in Osaka	日本侠客伝 浪花篇	1965.01.30	Masahiro Makino		Yakuza	
	母の歳月	1965.01.30	Junzō Mizukawa			
Five Gents' Trick Book	社長忍法帖	1965.01.31	Shue Matsubayashi	Hisaya Morishige, Asami Kuji, Keiju Kobayashi	Comedy	
Nami kage	波影	1965.01.31	Shiro Toyoda	Ayako Wakao, Mayumi Ozora, Kyu Sazanka		
	しゃぶりつくせ	1965.02.__	Taizō Nanbu			
	情炎の私刑	1965.02.__	Kiyoshi Komori			
	盗まれた肌	1965.02.__	Kei Miyaguchi			
	肉体の賭け	1965.02.__	Satoru Kobayashi			
	曝かれた大陸	1965.02.__	松崎耿三			
	夫婦生活	1965.02.__	Takeo Takagi			
	40年大相撲初場所 後半戦	1965.02.03	Torahiko Ise [composition]			
	ギャングの肖像	1965.02.03	Takumi Furukawa		Yakuza	
	現代悪党仁義	1965.02.03	Kō Nakahira			
Daiso Samo	大捜査網	1965.02.06	Mitsuo Murayama			
Ura Kaidan	裏階段	1965.02.06	Umetsugu Inoue			
	お座敷小唄	1965.02.13	Kinya Sakai			
	サラリーマンの勲章	1965.02.13	Manao Horiuchi			
War of Roses	バラケツ勝負	1965.02.13	Sadatsugu Matsuda			
Kenju Yaro	拳銃野郎	1965.02.13	Motomu Ida		Yakuza	
	黒い猫	1965.02.13	Yūsuke Watanabe		Drama	
	投げたダイスが明日を呼ぶ	1965.02.13	Yōichi Ushihara			
Underworld: Annihilation Tactics	暗黒街全滅作戦	1965.02.14	Jun Fukuda		Yakuza	
	肉体の学校	1965.02.14	Ryō Kinoshita			
	女めくら物語	1965.02.20	Kōji Shima			
The Bloody Shuriken	赤い手裏剣	1965.02.20	Tokuzō Tanaka		Jidai-geki	
Tattooed Magistrate	いれずみ判官	1965.02.25	Tadashi Sawashima		Jidai-geki	
Ninja Chushingura	忍法忠臣蔵	1965.02.25	Yasuto Hasegawa		Jidai-geki / Ninja	
	背後の人	1965.02.26	Mitsuo Yagi			
	皇太子ご夫妻タイ国の旅	1965.02.27	Katsumi Ōmori			
	美しさと哀しみと	1965.02.28	Masahiro Shinoda			
Story of a Prostitute	春婦伝	1965.02.28	Seijun Suzuki	Yumiko Nogawa		
	金色の肌	1965.03.__	Kiyoshi Komori			
	女臭	1965.03.__	田家不二男			
	傷だらけの欲望	1965.03.__	Satoru Kobayashi			
	性宴	1965.03.__	Namio Yuasa			
	鉄火芸者	1965.03.__	Kōji Seki			
	肉体のドライブ	1965.03.__	Takahide Shindō			
	濡れた牝馬	1965.03.__	Tatsuo Asano			
	変態	1965.03.__	Takashi Shiga			
	あばれ騎士道	1965.03.06	Isamu Kosugi			
	城取り	1965.03.06	Toshio Masuda		Jidai-geki	
	暴れ犬	1965.03.06	Kazuo Mori			
	孤独の賭け	1965.03.10	Shinji Murayama		Drama	
	われら劣等生	1965.03.13	Yūzō Satō			
Young Boss	若親分	1965.03.13	Kazuo Ikehiro		Yakuza	
Yakuza Soldier	兵隊やくざ	1965.03.13	Yasuzō Masumura		Yakuza	
	陽のあたる椅子	1965.03.13	Tetsuhiro Kawasaki			
The Hoodlum Soldier	兵隊やくざ	1965.03.13	Yasuzo Masumura	Shintaro Katsu, Takahiro Tamura, Eiko Taki	Yakuza	
	ガリバーの宇宙旅行	1965.03.20	Yoshio Kuroda		Anime	
	少年忍者 風のフジ丸 まぼろし魔術団	1965.03.20	Daisaku Shirakawa, Kimio Yabuki		Anime	compilation of TV episodes
	狼少年ケン おく病なライオン	1965.03.20	Yūgo Serikawa		Anime	
	悲しき別れの歌	1965.03.20	Katsumi Nishikawa			
	北国の街	1965.03.20	Nozomu Yanase			
Tokyo Olympiad	東京オリンピック	1965.03.20	Kon Ichikawa		Documentary	
	殴り込み侍	1965.03.31	Hiroki Matsuno		Jidai-geki	
	可愛いあの娘	1965.03.31	Ryūichi Takamori		Drama	
	虹をつかむ恋人たち	1965.03.31	Masaharu Segawa		Drama	
The Birth of Judo	明治の風雪 柔旋風	1965.03.31	Kunio Watanabe	Soichi Hirai, Yoko Matsuyama, Shintaro Kuraoka	Judo	
	くされ縁	1965.04.__	Takashi Shiga			
	異常者	1965.04.__	Jun Sugiura			
	炎を抱く女	1965.04.__	Kan Kataoka			
	姦婦	1965.04.__	Kei Miyaguchi			
	甘い陶酔	1965.04.__	Jirō Tsurumaki			
	狂い咲き	1965.04.__	Shinya Yamamoto			
	黒・白・黒？	1965.04.__	Kinya Ogawa			
	死ぬほど抱いて	1965.04.__	Saburō Kyōdō			
	女こまし	1965.04.__	Taizō Nanbu			
	情事の履歴書	1965.04.__	Kōji Wakamatsu			
	情事の罠	1965.04.__	Isao Tsukimori			
	色ざんげ	1965.04.__	Fumihiro Ito			
	売春	1965.04.__	Tatsuo Asano			
	枕探し	1965.04.__	Tamizō Shibuya			
	牝蜂	1965.04.__	Namio Yuasa			
	夜の聖女	1965.04.__	神戸恭介			
	ウナ・セラ・ディ東京	1965.04.02	Yoshiaki Banshō			
	40年大相撲春場所	1965.04.03	Torahiko Ise [composition]			
	さすらいは俺の運命	1965.04.03	Motomu Ida			
Zatoichi's Revenge	座頭市二段斬り	1965.04.03	Akira Inoue		Jidai-geki	
Nezumi-Kozo Jirokichi	鼠小僧次郎吉	1965.04.03	Kenji Misumi		Jidai-geki	
Crest of a Man: Ambush on the Highway	男の紋章 喧嘩街道	1965.04.03	Eisuke Takizawa		Yakuza	
Red Beard	赤ひげ	1965.04.03	Akira Kurosawa	Toshirō Mifune, Yūzō Kayama, Tsutomu Yamazaki	Jidai-geki	
	アンコ椿は恋の花	1965.04.10	Hideo Sakurai			
	雪国	1965.04.10	Hideo Ōba			
Cold Rice, Osan, Chan	冷飯とおさんとちゃん	1965.04.10	Tomotaka Tasaka		Jidai-geki	
	こゝから始まる	1965.04.14	Takashi Tsuboshima			
	青春の裁き	1965.04.14	Isamu Kosugi			
	落葉の炎	1965.04.14	Masuo Maeda			
	帯をとく夏子	1965.04.17	Shigeo Tanaka			
	夜の勲章	1965.04.17	Tetsutarō Murano		Yakuza	
	河内ぞろ あばれ凧	1965.04.18	Mio Ezaki			
	関東流れ者	1965.04.18	Shigehiro Ozawa		Yakuza	
Abashiri Prison	網走番外地	1965.04.18	Teruo Ishii	Ken Takakura	Yakuza	First successful Yakuza film First in Abashiri Prison series
	大日本チャンバラ伝	1965.04.21	Ren Yoshimura			
	かわいい浩宮さま	1965.04.24				
	すっ飛び野郎	1965.04.28	Hirokazu Ichimura			
	我が青春	1965.04.28	Manao Horiuchi			
	未成年 続・キューポラのある街	1965.04.29	Takashi Nomura			
Tears of Thanks	涙をありがとう	1965.04.29	Kenjirō Morinaga		Yakuza	
	おゝい雲！	1965.05.01	Masaharu Segawa			
	にっぽん泥棒物語	1965.05.01	Satsuo Yamamoto		Drama	
Sleepy Eyes of Death: Sword of Satan	眠狂四郎魔性剣	1965.05.01	Kimiyoshi Yasuda		Jidai-geki	
	0の抵抗	1965.05.__	Isao Tsukimori			
	BG物語 好きならあげる	1965.05.__	Hideaki Ōnishi			
	いろ女	1965.05.__	Yoshihisa Sanada			
	艶説四谷怪談	1965.05.__	Toshiya Fujita		Jidai-geki	
	好色	1965.05.__	Saburō Kyōdō			
	好色森の石松	1965.05.__	Masayoshi Ōnuki		Jidai-geki	
	鎖の女	1965.05.__	Jirō Tsurumaki			
	妾ごろし	1965.05.__	Jirō Tsurumaki			
	雪の涯て（青春0地帯）	1965.05.__	Kōe Shindō			
	狙われた新妻	1965.05.__	Masato Hoshiai			
	太陽のヘソ	1965.05.__	Kōji Wakamatsu			
	痴情の系図	1965.05.__	Jun Matsuura			
	肉	1965.05.__	Kan Mukai			
	日本奇説性祭記	1965.05.__	新井裕司, Ryōsuke Ibuki			
Bad Reputation's Banner	悪名幟	1965.05.01	Tokuzō Tanaka		Yakuza	
The Grand Contest	大勝負	1965.05.08	Umetsugu Inoue		Jidai-geki	
	東京パラリンピック 愛と栄光の祭典	1965.05.15	Kimio Watanabe			
	悪魔のようなすてきな奴	1965.05.15	Michio Konishi		Drama	
	証人の椅子	1965.05.15	Satsuo Yamamoto			
	おゝ猛妻	1965.05.16	Yoshio Hishida			
	その口紅が憎い	1965.05.16	Kazuo Hase			
	意気に感ず	1965.05.16	Buichi Saitō			
	最後の審判	1965.05.16	Hiromichi Horikawa			
	青春前期 青い果実	1965.05.16	Kiyoshi Horiike			
Homeless Ninja Scroll	風来忍法帖	1965.05.16	Tetsuhiro Kawasaki		Jidai-geki / Ninja	
Wanderers: Three Yakuza	股旅三人やくざ	1965.05.22	Tadashi Sawashima		Jidai-geki	
	色ごと師春団治	1965.05.22	Masahiro Makino			
	40年大相撲夏場所 前半戦	1965.05.26	Torahiko Ise [composition]			
	日本列島	1965.05.26	Kei Kumai			
	夜明けのうた	1965.05.26	Koreyoshi Kurahara			
	動乱のベトナム	1965.05.27	赤佐政治			
	雲を呼ぶ講道館	1965.05.27	Tarō Yuge			
	ぜったい多数	1965.05.28	Noboru Nakamura			
	霧の旗	1965.05.28	Yōji Yamada			
Nippon ichi no goma suri otoko	日本一のゴマすり男	1965.05.29	Kengo Furusawa	Hitoshi Ueki, Mie Hama, Mie Nakao		
Sanshiro Sugata	姿三四郎	1965.05.29	Seiichirō Uchikawa	Yūzō Kayama, Tsutomu Yamazaki, Eiji Okada	Jidai-geki / Judo	
	あばずれ	1965.06.__	Mamoru Watanabe			
	つまみ喰い	1965.06.__	Shinya Yamamoto			
	愛撫	1965.06.__	Fumihiro Ito			
	汚された肌	1965.06.__	Shō Fujita			
	砂利の女	1965.06.__	Kan Mukai			
	種馬	1965.06.__	Kei Miyaguchi			
	処女流転	1965.06.__	Seiji Kai			
	女子学生を狙え！	1965.06.__	Toshio Nanba			
	色好み三度笠	1965.06.__	Takeo Takagi			
	真夜中の処女	1965.06.__	Shin Nakazawa			
	水中裸の浮世絵 蛇魂	1965.06.__	Gorō Same			
	美人局	1965.06.__	Kiyoshi Komori			
	浮世絵の女	1965.06.__	Shirō Azuma			
	腐肉の群れ	1965.06.__	Rentarō Mikuni			
	暴行拷問私刑秘史 赤い門	1965.06.__	Kōji Miura			
	夜匐い虫	1965.06.__	Kensuke Sawa			
Secrets Behind the Wall	壁の中の秘事	1965.06.__	Kōji Wakamatsu			Entered into the 15th Berlin International Film Festival
	40年大相撲夏場所 後半戦	1965.06.02	Torahiko Ise [composition]			
	一発かましたれ	1965.06.05	Mikio Koyama		Comedy	
	逃亡	1965.06.05	Michio Konishi		Drama	
	黒い雪	1965.06.09	Tetsuji Takechi		Drama	
	夜霧の脱出	1965.06.09	Isamu Kosugi			
	呼んでるぜあの風が	1965.06.12	Hiromu Edagawa			
	昨日のあいつ今日のおれ	1965.06.12	Yoshikazu Ōtsuki			
	狸穴町0番地	1965.06.12	Keigo Kimura			
Shinobi no Mono 6: Iga Mansion	忍びの者 伊賀屋敷	1965.06.12	Kazuo Mori		Jidai-geki / Ninja	
	いろ	1965.06.13	Shinji Murayama		Yakuza	
	暗黒街仁義	1965.06.13	Yūsuke Watanabe		Yakuza	
Retreat from Kiska	太平洋奇跡の作戦 キスカ	1965.06.19	Seiji Maruyama	Toshiro Mifune, So Yamamura, Makoto Sato	WWII	
	処女喪失	1965.06.20	Motomu Ida			
You Can At Least Try	おれについてこい！	1965.06.20	Hiromichi Horikawa	Hajime Hana, Yumi Shirakawa, Chikage Awashima		
Zoku Nishi no Osho - Higashi no Taisho	続・西の王将東の王将	1965.06.20	Toshio Sugie	Kei Tani, Makoto Fujita, Reiko Dan		
	命しらずのろくでなし	1965.06.23	Mio Ezaki			
	清作の妻	1965.06.25	Yasuzō Masumura			
Fangs of Revenge	復讐の牙	1965.06.25	Umetsugu Inoue			
	おしゃべりな真珠	1965.06.26	Yoshirō Kawazu			
	ちんころ海女っこ	1965.06.26	Yōichi Maeda			
The Third Contest	主水之介三番勝負	1965.06.27	Tetsuya Yamanouchi		Jidai-geki	
	蝶々雄二の夫婦善哉	1965.06.27	Masahiro Makino		Comedy	
	00の乳房	1965.07.__	Kōe Shindō			
	あゝ性戦異常あり	1965.07.__	Kan Kataoka			
	いろ地獄	1965.07.__	Giichi Nishihara			
	いろ盗人	1965.07.__	Haruo Matsubara			
	うずき	1965.07.__	瑞田俊二			
	かどわかし	1965.07.__	Satoru Kobayashi			
	ヒップで勝負	1965.07.__	Kōji Seki			
	悪の痴態	1965.07.__	Shirō Azuma			
	陰獣	1965.07.__	Taizō Nanbu			
	漁色	1965.07.__	Kensuke Sawa			
	好色あんま日記	1965.07.__	Yoshitachi Sunayama			
	女にして	1965.07.__	Saburō Kyōdō			
	女の凶器	1965.07.__	Jirō Tsukushi			
	性に泣く女	1965.07.__	Kinya Ogawa			
	性の代償	1965.07.__	Toshiya Fujita			
	性の爆発	1965.07.__	Jirō Karasawa			
	熱い夜	1965.07.__	Susumu Okano			
	冒涜の罠	1965.07.__	Kōji Wakamatsu			
	未公開の情事	1965.07.__	Shinya Yamamoto			
	未成熟	1965.07.__	Shunichi Nao			
	誘拐	1965.07.__	Satoru Kobayashi			
	真紅な海が呼んでるぜ	1965.07.03	Akinori Matsuo			
	青いくちづけ	1965.07.03	Yoshio Inoue			
Tosei Ichidai	渡世一代	1965.07.03	Buichi Saitō		Yakuza	
Bwana Toshi	ブワナ・トシの歌	1965.07.03	Susumu Hani	Kiyoshi Atsumi, Hamisi Salehe, Tsutomu Shimomoto		
Kigeki Ekimae kinyu	喜劇 駅前金融	1965.07.04	Kozo Saeki	Hisaya Morishige, Junzaburo Ban, Frankie Sakai	Comedy	
	関東やくざ者	1965.07.10	Shigehiro Ozawa		Yakuza	
Abashiri Prison Continuation	続網走番外地	1965.07.10	Teruo Ishii		Yakuza	
	調子のいい奴 いたずらの天才	1965.07.10	Kazui Nihonmatsu			
Samurai Spy	異聞猿飛佐助	1965.07.10	Masahiro Shinoda	Kōji Takahashi, Seiji Miyaguchi, Tetsuro Tamba	Jidai-geki / Ninja	
	青春とはなんだ	1965.07.14	Toshio Masuda			
	青春のお通り	1965.07.14	Kenjirō Morinaga			
Life of Matsu the Untamed	無法松の一生	1965.07.14	Kenji Misumi		Jidai-geki	
	スーパー・ジェッター	1965.07.24	Kiyoshi Ōnishi			
	宇宙パトロールホッパ	1965.07.24	Taiji Yabushita		Anime	
	宇宙少年ソラン	1965.07.24	Tsunetoki Seko			
	風のフジ丸 少年忍者大猿退治	1965.07.24	Daisaku Shirakawa, 村上鎮雄		Anime	compilation of TV episodes
	狼少年ケン 誇りたかきゴリラ	1965.07.24	Isao Takahata		Anime	
	素敵な今晩わ	1965.07.24	Yoshitarō Nomura			
Crest of a Man: Ruten's Law	男の紋章 流転の掟	1965.07.24	Eisuke Takizawa		Yakuza	
	裸の青春	1965.07.24	Junzō Mizukawa			
Illusion of Blood	四谷怪談	1965.07.25	Shiro Toyoda	Tatsuya Nakadai, Mariko Okada, Junko Ikeuchi	Jidai-geki	
Tanuki no taisho	狸の大将	1965.07.25	Kajiro Yamamoto	Keiju Kobayashi, Keiko Awaji, Yu Fujiki		
	006は浮気の番号	1965.07.28	Toshirō Ōmi			
Cat Girl Gamblers	賭場の牝猫	1965.07.28	Haruyasu Noguchi		Yakuza	
	不倫	1965.07.31	Shigeo Tanaka			
	六人の女を殺した男	1965.07.31	Kōji Shima			
	怪談せむし男	1965.08.01	Hajime Satō		Drama	
	黒い賭博師	1965.08.01	Kō Nakahira		Yakuza	
Chivalrous Nature	任侠木曽鴉	1965.08.01	Eiichi Kudō		Jidai-geki	
	エッチ重役	1965.08.__	Tamizō Shibuya			
	愛欲	1965.08.__	Takeo Takagi			
	快楽の終焉	1965.08.__	佐々木一子			
	狂った本能	1965.08.__	Saburō Kyōdō			
	激情のハイウェー	1965.08.__	Giichi Nishihara			
	処女未亡人	1965.08.__	Kan Kataoka			
	女体烙印	1965.08.__	Haruo Matsubara			
	招かれざる指	1965.08.__	遠藤芙美夫			
	赤いしごき 日本毒婦伝	1965.08.__	風魔三郎			
	絶倫	1965.08.__	Kiyoshi Komori			
	痴情の密漁	1965.08.__	Kinya Ogawa			
	燃える女	1965.08.__	Ryōsuke Ibuki			
	夜の女炎	1965.08.__	Takashi Yamada			
	裸の世代	1965.08.__	Isao Tsukimori			
	嬲る	1965.08.__	沖全吉			
	毒唇	1965.08.__	Kōji Seki			
	あの娘と僕 スイム・スイム・スイム	1965.08.07	Hirokazu Ichimura			
	若いしぶき	1965.08.07	Mitsuo Yagi			
Frankenstein vs. Baragon	フランケンシュタイン対地底怪獣	1965.08.08	Ishirō Honda	Tadao Takashima, Nick Adams, Kumi Mizuno		
Standby Collegiate	海の若大将	1965.08.08	Kengo Furusawa	Yuzo Kayami, Yuriko Hoshi, Kunie Tanaka		
	ダニ	1965.08.12	Hideo Sekikawa		Yakuza	
Chilvarous Story of Japan: Episode in Eastern Japan	日本侠客伝 関東篇	1965.08.12	Masahiro Makino		Yakuza	
We Will Remember	戦場にながれる歌	1965.08.13	Zenzo Matsuyama	Kiyoshi Kodama, Yoichi Mashio, Masanari Nihei		
Young Boss: Release From Prison	若親分出獄	1965.08.14	Kazuo Ikehiro		Yakuza	
	星と俺とできめたんだ	1965.08.14	Motomu Ida			
Yakuza Soldier Continued	続・兵隊やくざ	1965.08.14	Tokuzō Tanaka		Yakuza	
	明日は咲こう花咲こう	1965.08.14	Mio Ezaki			
	俺たちの恋	1965.08.21	Kazuo Hase			
	馬鹿っちょ出船	1965.08.21	Hideo Sakurai			
The Kingdom of Jirocho Part 4	次郎長三国志 甲州路殴り込み	1965.08.25	Masahiro Makino		Jidai-geki	
	大日本殺し屋伝	1965.08.25	Haruyasu Noguchi			
Mushukumono Jingi	無宿者仁義	1965.08.25	Umetsugu Inoue			
Stories of Bastards: Born Under a Bad Star	悪太郎伝 悪い星の下でも	1965.08.25	Seijun Suzuki	Ryozo Kasahara		
White Rose of Hong Kong	香港の白い薔薇	1965.08.25	Jun Fukuda	Tsutomu Yarazaki, Chang Mei-Yao, Akira Takarada		
Pleasures of the Flesh	悦楽	1965.08.29	Nagisa Ōshima		Yakuza	
	血と掟	1965.08.29	Namio Yuasa		Yakuza	
	しごかれた情欲	1965.09.__	Masayoshi Ōnuki			
	愛欲の叫び	1965.09.__	Taira Takano			
	火遊び	1965.09.__	Yūji Ōno			
	花と蛇	1965.09.__	Shintarō Kishi			
	快楽	1965.09.__	Fumihiro Ito			
	四つの乳房	1965.09.__	Hideki Miki			
	十代の呻吟	1965.09.__	Kaoru Umezawa			
	処女の領収書	1965.09.__	Tetsurō Yamaguchi			
	処女無残	1965.09.__	Taizō Nanbu			
	妾の子	1965.09.__	沖全吉			
	青い悦楽	1965.09.__	Tadashi Asaoka			
	赤いしたたり	1965.09.__	Miki Tashiro			
	素肌の叫び	1965.09.__	星名雅人			
	憎い肌	1965.09.__	Shō Fujita		Drama	
	肉体の報酬	1965.09.__	Giichi Nishihara			
	乳ぼくろ	1965.09.__	Fumihiro Ito		Drama	
	腐肉の喘ぎ	1965.09.__	Kōe Shindō			
	密戯	1965.09.__	Kan Mukai			
	野郎と牝犬	1965.09.__	Shinya Yamamoto			
	欲求不満	1965.09.__	Masayoshi Ōnuki			
	裸女山脈	1965.09.__	川合茂貴			
	流転の愛欲	1965.09.__	Kan Kataoka			
	歪んだ関係	1965.09.__	Kōji Wakamatsu		Drama	
	あゝ零戦	1965.09.04	Mitsuo Murayama		WWII	
	スパイ	1965.09.04	Satsuo Yamamoto			
	怪談片目の狼	1965.09.04	Tsuneo Kobayashi		Supernatural	
Miyamoto Musashi V: Duel at Ganryu Island	宮本武蔵 巌流島の決斗	1965.09.04	Tomu Uchida		Jidai-geki	
	三匹の野良犬	1965.09.04	Yōichi Ushihara		Yakuza	
Chichibu Suikoden: Hissatsu Ken	秩父水滸伝 必殺剣	1965.09.04	Haruyasu Noguchi		Yakuza	
Beast Alley	けものみち	1965.09.05	Eizo Sugawa	Junko Ikeuchi, Keiju Kobayashi, Eitaro Ozawa		
Hana no o Edo no hokaibo	花のお江戸の法界坊	1965.09.05	Seiji Hisamatsu	Frankie Sakai, Keiko Awaji, Mariko Okada	Jidai-geki	
	あいつとの冒険	1965.09.18	Kiyoshi Horiike		Drama	
	喜劇 各駅停車	1965.09.18	Kazuo Inoue		Comedy	
	喜劇 大親分	1965.09.18	Kinya Sakai			
New Kurama Tengu	新・鞍馬天狗	1965.09.18	Kimiyoshi Yasuda		Jidai-geki	
Snake Princess	新蛇姫様 お島千太郎	1965.09.18	Tadashi Sawashima		Jidai-geki	
	東京は恋する	1965.09.18	Nozomu Yanase		Drama	
Tale of Meiji Era Chivalry: Third in Succession	明治侠客伝 三代目襲名	1965.09.18	Tai Katō			
Fort Graveyard	血と砂	1965.09.18	Kihachi Okamoto	Toshiro Mifune		
Sword of the Beast	獣の剣	1965.09.18	Hideo Gosha	Mikijiro Hira	Jidai-geki	
Zatoichi and the Doomed Man	座頭市逆手斬り	1965.09.18	Issei Mori	Shintaro Katsu, Kanbei Fujiyama, Eiko Taki	Jidai-geki / Chambara	
	やさぐれの掟	1965.09.30	Namio Yuasa			
	青雲やくざ	1965.09.30	Meijirō Umetsu		Yakuza	
	タバコと灰	1965.10.01	Sadao Tsukioka			
	しずく	1965.10.01	Osamu Tezuka			
	かも	1965.10.01	Hideo Sekikawa		Yakuza	
	泣かせるぜ	1965.10.01	Akinori Matsuo			
	血と海	1965.10.01	Takashi Nomura			
Brutal Tales of Chivalry	昭和残侠伝	1965.10.01	Kiyoshi Saeki		Yakuza	
	可愛い悪魔 このまま殺して	1965.10.__	Yūzō Fuji			
	めかけ芸者	1965.10.__	Isao Tsukimori			
	愛欲の白い肌	1965.10.__	Fumihiro Ito			
	悪の卵	1965.10.__	中村精			
	強烈な情事	1965.10.__	Kinya Ogawa			
	紅壺	1965.10.__	Mamoru Watanabe			
	処女の反撥	1965.10.__	Kazuo Kuramoto			
	女の砂丘	1965.10.__	Shō Fujita			
	女の性	1965.10.__	Takeo Takagi			
	女の痛恨	1965.10.__	Osamu Yamashita			
	女の林	1965.10.__	Fukujirō Yamazaki			
	女高生日記	1965.10.__	Isao Saitō			
	情死	1965.10.__	Kiyoshi Komori			
	情夫と牝	1965.10.__	Mamoru Watanabe			
	痴情の罠	1965.10.__	Seiji Kai			
	泥沼の歓び	1965.10.__	Miki Yamane			
	肉体の傷あと	1965.10.__	Tamizō Shibuya			
	濡れた女	1965.10.__	Haruo Matsubara			
	熱い樹液	1965.10.__	Toshiya Fujita, Susumu Okano			
	蜜のおとし穴	1965.10.__	Shinya Yamamoto			
	野武士	1965.10.__	Ryōsuke Kurahashi			
	黒い誘惑	1965.10.02	Umetsugu Inoue			
	妻の日の愛のかたみに	1965.10.02	Sōkichi Tomimoto			
	黒い賭博師 ダイスで殺せ	1965.10.08	Mio Ezaki		Yakuza	
Crest of a Man: I Am A Killer	男の紋章 俺は斬る	1965.10.08	Motomu Ida		Yakuza	
	大工太平記	1965.10.09	Shirō Toyoda			
	六條ゆきやま紬	1965.10.09	Zenzō Matsuyama			
	おんな番外地 鎖の牝犬	1965.10.15	Shinji Murayama			
Ninkyo Otoko Ippiki	任侠男一匹	1965.10.15	Masahiro Makino		Yakuza	
	求婚旅行	1965.10.16	Hirokazu Ichimura			
Sword Devil	剣鬼	1965.10.16	Kenji Misumi		Jidai-geki	
	続・柔旋風 四天王誕生	1965.10.16	Masateru Nishiyama			
Pickpocket	掏摸（すり）	1965.10.16	Tarō Yuge			
	悪の階段	1965.10.23	Hideo Suzuki			
	怪盗X 首のない男	1965.10.23	Isamu Kosugi			
Cat Girl Gamblers: Naked Flesh Paid Into the Pot	賭場の牝猫 素肌の壺振り	1965.10.23	Haruyasu Noguchi		Yakuza	
International Secret Police: Key of Keys	国際秘密警察 鍵の鍵	1965.10.23	Senkichi Taniguchi	Tatsuya Mihashi, Tadao Nakamaru, Susumu Kurobe		
	大阪ど根性物語 どえらい奴	1965.10.24	Noribumi Suzuki		Drama	
Breaking Down The Magistrate	天保遊侠伝 代官所破り	1965.10.24	Tetsuya Yamanouchi		Jidai-geki	
	学生仁義	1965.10.27	Mitsuo Murayama			
Bad Reputation is Invicible	悪名無敵	1965.10.27	Tokuzō Tanaka		Yakuza	
	ぼくはどうして涙がでるの	1965.10.30	Kenjirō Morinaga			
	恐山の女	1965.10.30	Heinosuke Gosho			
	父と娘の歌	1965.10.30	Buichi Saitō			
	暴力の港 虎と狼	1965.10.30	Michiyoshi Doi			
Kanto Hamonjo	関東破門状	1965.10.31	Shigehiro Ozawa			
	喜劇 駅前大学	1965.10.31	Kōzō Saeki			
	大冒険	1965.10.31	Kengo Furusawa			
Abashiri Prison: Love for the Homeland	網走番外地 望郷篇	1965.10.31	Teruo Ishii		Yakuza	
	あやまち	1965.11.__	Taihei Kobayashi			
	ギラついた裸獣の群れ	1965.11.__	Ryōsuke Kurahashi			
	やくざ芸者	1965.11.__	Kyōko Ōgimachi		Yakuza	
	愛欲の十三階段	1965.11.__	Takeo Takagi			
	灰色の悶え	1965.11.__	Kazuo Kimata			
	甘い唾液	1965.11.__	Bunta Matsui			
	禁じられた肌	1965.11.__	Ario Takeda			
	娼婦真紀子抄 砂の女	1965.11.__	Kinnosuke Fukada			
	埋蔵金物語 残虐の穴	1965.11.__	Kōji Seki			
	十八人の脱走娘	1965.11.__	Tatsuo Asano			
	女ざかり	1965.11.__	Kiyoshi Komori			
	女の崖	1965.11.__	Masafusa Ozaki			
	妾ら花	1965.11.__	Fumihiro Ito			
	情怨の女子大生	1965.11.__	Susumu Okano			
	情事の果て	1965.11.__	Jirō Karasawa			
	色舞	1965.11.__	Kan Mukai			
	赤いぼうふら	1965.11.__	Haruo Matsubara			
	狙われた肌	1965.11.__	Takashi Yamada			
	素肌のおんな	1965.11.__				
	尼僧の門	1965.11.__	Hiroshi Minamikawa			
	肉の炎	1965.11.__	Mitsuomi Takahashi			
	肉体女優日記	1965.11.__	Shinya Yamamoto			
	背徳	1965.11.__	Ryōsuke Kurahashi			
	肌のあやまち	1965.11.__	Osamu Yamashita			
	不倫妻	1965.11.__	Seishirō Kanzaki			
	夜ごとの牝猫	1965.11.__	Kinya Ogawa			
	夜のいたずら	1965.11.__	Masanao Sakao			
	夜の亀裂	1965.11.__	Seiji Kai			
	欲望のあらし	1965.11.__	Taizō Nanbu			
	第三の情事	1965.11.__	Takashi Chiba			
	血と肉	1965.11.__	Kinnosuke Fukada		Drama	
	牝狼	1965.11.__	竜神昇			
	地獄の波止場	1965.11.13	Masaharu Segawa		Yakuza	
	密告者	1965.11.13	Shigeo Tanaka			
	牝犬脱走	1965.11.13	Tarō Yuge			
	野郎に国境はない	1965.11.13	Kō Nakahira			
Yakuza G-Men: Meiji Underworld	やくざGメン 明治暗黒街	1965.11.13	Eiichi Kudō		Yakuza	
Tattooed Life	刺青一代	1965.11.13	Seijun Suzuki	Hideki Takahashi	Yakuza	
Flower and Dragon	花と龍	1965.11.20	Kōsaku Yamashita		Yakuza	
	続青雲やくざ 怒りの男	1965.11.20	Kazuo Hase		Yakuza	
	逃亡と掟	1965.11.20	Namio Yuasa			
	流れ者仁義	1965.11.20	Hideo Sekikawa		Yakuza	
	あんま太平記	1965.11.21	Kōzō Saeki			
Conquest	悪党	1965.11.21	Kaneto Shindō		Jidai-geki	
	結婚相談	1965.11.23	Kō Nakahira			
	水で書かれた物語	1965.11.23	Yoshishige Yoshida			
New Kurama Tengu: Duel on Gojo Hill	新・鞍馬天狗 五條坂の決闘	1965.11.27	Yoshiyuki Kuroda		Jidai-geki	
Gamera	大怪獣ガメラ	1965.11.27	Noriaki Yuasa	Eiji Funakoshi, Harumi, Junichiro Yamashiko		
	あばかれた欲情	1965.12.__	Tamizō Shibuya			
	すすり泣く肌	1965.12.__	木俣和子			
	ぬま	1965.12.__	Toshio Nanba			
	現代悪女伝 ピンクピンク作戦	1965.12.__	Kinnosuke Fukada			
	愛欲のいけにえ	1965.12.__	Susumu Okano			
	悦楽の代償	1965.12.__	Kazuo Yamamoto			
	チコという女 可愛い肌	1965.12.__	Giichi Nishihara			
	乾いた処女	1965.12.__	Kaoru Umezawa			
	狂った愛欲	1965.12.__	Toshiya Fujita			
	口説き	1965.12.__	Kentarō Masuda			
	熟した汗	1965.12.__	遠藤芙未夫			
	初めての夜	1965.12.__	Hiroshi Naitō			
	女色ごと師	1965.12.__	山崎憲文			
	女肌のにおい	1965.12.__	Kei Miyaguchi			
	情事に賭けろ	1965.12.__	Takashi Chiba			
	情痴の罠	1965.12.__	Seiji Kai			
	色欲のもつれ	1965.12.__	Kinya Ogawa			
	深夜の戯れ	1965.12.__	Ichirō Kyōdō			
	制服の転落	1965.12.__	Shō Fujita			
	肉体の迷路	1965.12.__				
	破戒女	1965.12.__	Kan Mukai			
	背徳の女	1965.12.__	武市芽良夫			
	肌の餌	1965.12.__				
	牝猫のにおい	1965.12.__				
	欲望の血がしたたる	1965.12.__	Kōji Wakamatsu			
	裸の餌	1965.12.__	石山堅			
	蠢き	1965.12.__	Kentarō Masuda			
	贅肉	1965.12.__	遠藤芙未夫			
	拳銃無宿 脱獄のブルース	1965.12.04	Kenjirō Morinaga			
	高原のお嬢さん	1965.12.04	Nozomu Yanase			
	無頼漢仁義	1965.12.04	Yūsuke Watanabe		Yakuza	
	夜の悪女	1965.12.04	Shinji Murayama		Yakuza	
	100発100中	1965.12.05	Jun Fukuda			
	さよならはダンスの後に	1965.12.05	Mitsuo Yagi			
	若い野ばら	1965.12.05	Mamoru Miyazaki			
	馬鹿と鋏	1965.12.05	Senkichi Taniguchi			
	ザ・ガードマン 東京用心棒	1965.12.11	Akira Inoue			
Hondara Kenpo	ほんだら剣法	1965.12.11	Kazuo Mori		Jidai-geki	
	ユンボギの日記	1965.12.11	Nagisa Ōshima			
Gang Top Tactics	ギャング頂上作戦	1965.12.18	Umetsugu Inoue		Yakuza	
	ハイウェイの王様	1965.12.18	Hirokazu Ichimura			
	マカオの竜	1965.12.18	Mio Ezaki			
Onmitsu Samurai Kiki Ippatsu	隠密侍危機一発	1965.12.18	Kōsaku Yamashita		Jidai-geki	
Nagurikomi Kanto-Sei	殴り込み関東政	1965.12.18	Haruyasu Noguchi		Yakuza	
	怒濤の対決	1965.12.18	Masateru Nishiyama			
Young Beats	エレキの若大将	1965.12.19	Katsuki Iwauchi		WWII	
Invasion of Astro-Monster	怪獣大戦争	1965.12.19	Ishirō Honda	Akira Takarada, Nick Adams, Kumi Mizuno	Science fiction	Japanese-American co-production
Zatoichi and the Chess Expert	座頭市地獄旅	1965.12.24	Kenji Misumi		Jidai-geki	
Teppo Inu	鉄砲犬	1965.12.24	Tetsutarō Murano			
	オバケのQ太郎	1965.12.25	Itsurō Yamaguchi, 大隅正秋			
	狼少年ケン 地底の女王 わんぱく作戦	1965.12.25	Yūgo Serikawa, Hiroshi Ikeda		Anime	
	四つの恋の物語	1965.12.28	Katsumi Nishikawa			
	赤い谷間の決斗	1965.12.28	Toshio Masuda			
Kanto Hatashijo	関東果し状	1965.12.31	Shigehiro Ozawa			
	赤い鷹	1965.12.31	Umetsugu Inoue			
	暖春	1965.12.31	Noboru Nakamura			
Abashiri Prison: Hokkai Territory	網走番外地 北海篇	1965.12.31	Teruo Ishii		Yakuza	

== See also ==
- 1965 in Japan
- 1965 in Japanese television
