= Theater of Life =

Theater of Life may refer to the following:

- Theater of Life (人生劇場, Jinsei Gekijō), a popular series of novels written by Shirō Ozaki
  - Theater of Life (1936 film), a 1936 film adaptation directed by Tomu Uchida
  - Theater of Life (1938 film), a 1938 film adaptation directed by Yasuki Chiba
  - Theater of Life Part One: Youth and Lust (人生劇場 第一部 青春愛欲篇), a 1952 film adaptation directed by Shin Saburi
  - Theater of Life Part Two: Spirit and Turmoil (人生劇場 第二部 残侠風雲篇), a 1953 film adaptation directed by Shin Saburi
  - Theater of Life Part Three: Nostalgia: Kira, Sanshū (人生劇場望郷篇 三州吉良港), a 1954 film adaptation directed by Shin Saburi
  - Theater of Life: Youth (人生劇場 青春篇), a 1958 film adaptation directed by Toshio Sugie
  - New Theater of Life (新人生劇場), a 1963 film adaptation directed by Tarō Yuge
  - Theater of Life: Hishakaku (人生劇場 飛車角), a 1963 derivative work directed by Tadashi Sawashima
  - Theater of Life: Return of Hishakaku (人生劇場 続 飛車角), a 1963 derivative work directed by Tadashi Sawashima
  - Theater of Life: New Hishakaku Story (人生劇場 新・飛車角), a 1964 derivative work directed by Tadashi Sawashima
  - Theater of Life (1964 film), a 1964 film adaptation directed by Toshio Musada
  - Hishakaku and Kiratsune: A Tale of Two Yakuza (人生劇場 飛車角と吉良常), a 1968 derivative work directed by Tomu Uchida
  - Theater of Life: Youth, Lust and Spirit (人生劇場 青春篇 愛欲篇 残侠篇), a 1972 film adaptation directed by Tai Kato
  - Theater of Life (1983 film), a 1983 film adaptation co-directed by Junya Satō, Kinji Fukasaku, and Sadao Nakajima
  - Animated Classics of Japanese Literature: Theater of Life, a 1986 animated adaptation of the Youth chapter

Theater of Life may also refer to:

- Theater of Life (인생극장), a 1983 South Korean film starring Won Mi-kyung
- Theater of Life (2016 film), a 2016 Canadian documentary
- "Theater of Life", a 2000 single by Japanese singer Konomi Suzuki used as the opening theme to the anime series Deca-Dence
- "Grand Theater of Life", a song composed by Yasunori Mitsuda for the 2022 video game Xenoblade Chronicles 3
