= 1966 in Japan =

- Decades: 1940s; 1950s; 1960s; 1970s; 1980s
- See also: Other events of 1966; History of Japan; Timeline; Years

Events from the year 1966 in Japan. Under the Japanese calendar, this year is known as Shōwa 41.

== Incumbents ==
- Emperor: Hirohito
- Prime Minister: Eisaku Satō (Liberal Democratic)
- Chief Cabinet Secretary: Tomisaburo Hashimoto until August 1, Kiichi Aichi until December 3, Kenji Fukunaga
- Chief Justice of the Supreme Court: Kisaburo Yokota until August 5, Masatoshi Yokota from August 6
- President of the House of Representatives: Kikuchirō Yamaguchi until December 3, Kentarō Ayabe until December 26
- President of the House of Councillors: Yūzō Shigemune

=== Governors ===
- Aichi Prefecture: Mikine Kuwahara
- Akita Prefecture: Yūjirō Obata
- Aomori Prefecture: Shunkichi Takeuchi
- Chiba Prefecture: Taketo Tomonō
- Ehime Prefecture: Sadatake Hisamatsu
- Fukui Prefecture: Eizō Kita
- Fukuoka Prefecture: Taichi Uzaki
- Fukushima Prefecture: Morie Kimura
- Gifu Prefecture: Yukiyasu Matsuno (until 16 October); Saburō Hirano (starting 17 October)
- Gunma Prefecture: Konroku Kanda
- Hiroshima Prefecture: Iduo Nagano
- Hokkaido: Kingo Machimura
- Hyogo Prefecture: Motohiko Kanai
- Ibaraki Prefecture: Nirō Iwakami
- Ishikawa Prefecture: Yōichi Nakanishi
- Iwate Prefecture: Tadashi Chida
- Kagawa Prefecture: Masanori Kaneko
- Kagoshima Prefecture: Katsushi Terazono
- Kanagawa Prefecture: Iwataro Uchiyama
- Kochi Prefecture: Masumi Mizobuchi
- Kumamoto Prefecture: Kōsaku Teramoto
- Kyoto Prefecture: Torazō Ninagawa
- Mie Prefecture: Satoru Tanaka
- Miyagi Prefecture: Shintaro Takahashi
- Miyazaki Prefecture: Hiroshi Kuroki
- Nagano Prefecture: Gon'ichirō Nishizawa
- Nagasaki Prefecture: Katsuya Sato
- Nara Prefecture: Ryozo Okuda
- Niigata Prefecture: Juichiro Tsukada (until 28 March); Shiro Watari (starting 8 May)
- Oita Prefecture: Kaoru Kinoshita
- Okayama Prefecture: Takenori Kato
- Osaka Prefecture: Gisen Satō
- Saga Prefecture: Sunao Ikeda
- Saitama Prefecture: Hiroshi Kurihara
- Shiga Prefecture: Kyujiro Taniguchi (until 6 December); Kinichiro Nozaki (starting 7 December)
- Shimane Prefecture: Choemon Tanabe
- Shizuoka Prefecture: Toshio Saitō
- Tochigi Prefecture: Nobuo Yokokawa
- Tokushima Prefecture: Yasunobu Takeichi
- Tokyo: Ryōtarō Azuma
- Tottori Prefecture: Jirō Ishiba
- Toyama Prefecture: Minoru Yoshida
- Wakayama Prefecture: Shinji Ono
- Yamagata Prefecture: Tōkichi Abiko
- Yamaguchi Prefecture: Masayuki Hashimoto
- Yamanashi Prefecture: Hisashi Amano

== Events ==
- January 9 – The Kanai Building fire in Kawasaki City, Kanagawa Prefecture leaves 12 dead, 14 injured.
- February 4 -All Nippon Airways Flight 60 crashes into Tokyo Bay, killing all 133 people on board.
- March 4 – Canadian Pacific Air Lines Flight 402 crashes while landing at night with poor visibility at Tokyo International Airport, with 64 out of 72 on board killed.
- March 5 – BOAC Flight 911 crashes while encountering severe Clear-air turbulence over Mount Fuji shortly after taking off from Tokyo International Airport, killing all 124 on board.
- March 11 – A spa hotel caught fire in Minakami, Gunma Prefecture, causing 30 deaths, 29 injuries, according to Japan Fire and Disaster Management Agency official confirmed report.
- March 25 – Hachinohe Rinkai Line was opened.
- April 1 – Japan switches to the Metric system.
- April 26 – Japan's biggest postwar public transportation strike.
- June 28 – Typhoon Kit hit eastern Honshu, kills 83 persons, injures 91 persons, according to Fire and Disaster Management Agency official confirmed reported.
- June 30 &ndash； July 2 &ndash； A first The Beatles concert show in Nippon Budokan, Chiyoda, Tokyo,
- August 22 – Frontier Tea Product Manufacturing, as predecessor of Ito En founded in Shizuoka City.
- September 25 – Two typhoons Helen and Ida landed in Japan on same days, according to Japanese government official confirmed report, total 317 persons were human fatalities with 824 persons were hurt.
- November 11 – All Nippon Airways Flight 533 crashes into the Seto Inland Sea, killing all 50 on board.
- Undated
  - Yamanashi Women's Junior College is founded.
  - Japanese birth rates plummeted due to the superstition that girls born in the year of the Fire Horse will grow up to kill their husbands.

== Births ==
- January 5 – Yuri Amano, voice actress
- January 17 – Jyoji Morikawa, author and illustrator
- January 17 – Hiroko Mita, actress
- January 28 – Seiji Mizushima, anime director
- January 31 – Nobuyuki Hoshino, former professional baseball pitcher
- February 4 – Kyōko Koizumi, actress and singer
- February 5 – Maiko Kawakami, actress
- March 7 – Atsushi Sakurai, singer (died 2023)
- April 3 – Mina Tominaga, voice actress
- April 19 – El Samurai, professional wrestler
- April 27 – Yoshihiro Togashi, author and illustrator
- June 26 – Yūko Minaguchi, voice actress
- July 11 – Kentaro Miura, manga artist (died 2021)
- July 12 – Taiji Sawada, musician (died 2011)
- July 15 – Masatoshi Nagase, actress
- July 25 – Wataru Takagi, voice actor
- July 28 – Shikao Suga, singer
- August 4 – Kensuke Sasaki, professional wrestler
- August 14 – Honami Suzuki, actress
- August 30 – Mikako Kotani, former synchronised swimming athlete
- September 2 – Yu Hayami, singer and actress
- September 11 – Kiko, Crown Princess of Japan, wife of Fumihito, Crown Prince of Japan
- October 8 – Toshiro Yufune, former professional baseball pitcher
- October 27 – Masanobu Takashima, actor
- October 31 – Koji Kanemoto, professional wrestler
- November 2 – Yoshinari Ogawa, professional wrestler
- November 6 – Kae Araki, voice actress
- November 13 – Mieharu, actor
- November 28 – Narumi Yasuda, actress
- December 12 – Último Dragón, professional wrestler
- December 17 – Yuko Arimori, former marathon runner
- December 22 – Sayuri Kokusho, actress
- December 27 – Masahiro Fukuda, former footballer

== Deaths ==
- January 10 – Nishizō Tsukahara, admiral (b. 1887)
- March 6 – Michitaro Tozuka, admiral (b. 1890)
- April 23 – George Ohsawa, dietist, founder of Macrobiotics (b. 1893)
- June 7 – Yoshishige Abe, philosopher and politician (b. 1883)
- June 15 – Sankichi Takahashi, admiral (b. 1882)
- July 12 – D.T. Suzuki, philosopher (b. 1870)
- September 12 – Aketo Nakamura, general (b. 1889)
- September 13 – Tomoshige Samejima, admiral (b. 1889)
- November 9 – Jisaburō Ozawa, admiral (b. 1886)
- November 14 – Zengo Yoshida, admiral (b. 1885)

== See also ==
- 1966 in Japanese television
- List of Japanese films of 1966
- 1966 in Japanese music
