= Tamaki Katori =

Japanese actress (1938–2015)

- 香取環
- Born: 21 October 1938; Kumamoto, Japan
- Died: 12 October 2015 (aged 76)

Tamaki Katori (香取環; 21 October 1938 – 12 October 2015) was a Japanese actress best known for her appearances in "pink film" during the 1960s and early 1970s. Katori was the star of Flesh Market (1962), the first of these softcore pornographic films made in Japan. With over 600 film credits between 1962 and 1972, she was one of the most prolific Japanese adult film actresses of the 1960s, and became known as the "Pink Princess" of the first wave of pink films.

== Life and career ==
=== Early life ===
Tamaki Katori was born in 1938. After being chosen as Kumamoto's entry in the Miss Universe Kumamoto beauty pageant, Katori was hired by Japan's oldest major film studio, Nikkatsu.

=== Flesh Market ===
Katori was still acting in supporting roles at Nikkatsu when she appeared in director Satoru Kobayashi's controversial 1962 film, Flesh Market. The first Japanese film to contain nudity (director Seijun Suzuki's Gate of Flesh, made for Nikkatsu in 1964, would become the first mainstream Japanese film to contain nude scenes), Flesh Market was shut down by the police and censored before it could be re-released. Officially considered the first pink film—the softcore pornographic genre which would dominate Japan's domestic cinema in the 1960s and 1970s-- Flesh Market became a huge box-office success. Even with the limited distribution it received as an independent production, Flesh Market, which was made for 8 million yen, took in over 100 million yen.

=== Nikkatsu ===
At Nikkatsu, Katori continued playing supporting roles, notably in several early films directed by future pink film master, Kōji Wakamatsu. In his pre-pink days at Nikkatsu, from 1963 to 1965, Wakamatsu made 20 low-budget exploitation movies based on current events such as sensational crimes and disasters. Though at first the work was steady, Katori was barely surviving on the bit-part wages from Nikkatsu. When the major film studios started facing a decline in audiences, they began cutting back in film output. Katori's income suffered as well.

=== Pink films ===
In the years after Flesh Market's release, several independent studios began specializing in the new pink film genre that had sprung up in the wake of that film's success. When one of these studios was willing to give Katori a contract to star in their pink films, she accepted the offer. She later explained, "They offered me 20,000 yen a movie. It was an incredible sum in those days. I hadn't been able to make it in mainstream movies because people said with my baby face and big boobs I was unbalanced, but those attributes turned out to be exactly what the pink movie business was looking for."

At Aoi Eiga studio, established in 1966 to specialize in these low-budget and profitable Pink films, Katori often worked in the sensationalistic and exploitative films of director Giichi Nishihara. Nishihara's films of the 1960s and 1970s would lead critics to call him both "Japan's sleaziest movie-maker," and "a cult favorite among devotees of extreme cinema." In Staircase of Sex (1968) Nishihara starred Katori with two foreign models in an attempt to cash in on the exotic appeal of the Caucasian performers. Allmovie critic Robert Firsching comments on her work for the director at this studio, "Katori... deserves some sort of medal for valor after allowing Nishihara and Aoi Eiga studios to have her brutally raped five times in four films."

Early in his career, "Pillar of Pink" director Mamoru Watanabe collaborated with Atsushi Yamatoya-- Seijun Suzuki's screenwriter on Branded to Kill—in several films. Katori starred in the team's 1969 film Women Hell Song: Man-Killing Benten, an atypical pink film inspired by Toei's Red Peony Gambler series. Jasper Sharp singles out a scene in which Katori makes love in an abandoned temple, as one of the most striking set pieces in the pink film genre.

Katori worked with Kōji Wakamatsu again in the late 1960s and early 1970s, after he had left Nikkatsu to form his own production company. In the Masao Adachi-scripted Sex Jack (1970), Katori appears as the lone female member of a group of anti-government radical students who plan to assassinate the prime minister and hijack a plane to North Korea. Shown at the Cannes Film Festival in 1971, French censors claimed the film was "anti-social". One of Katori's final films with Wakamatsu was Sex Family (1971), which starred future Nikkatsu Roman Porno queen, Junko Miyashita.

A leading actress of the first-wave of the Pink film from 1964 to 1972, a period which was dominated by independent studios, Katori retired from acting just as her old employer, Nikkatsu, was taking over the genre and establishing the second period of Pink film, the Roman Porno era.

=== Retirement ===
After retirement from film, Katori was married to actor Jun Funado for seven years. After they divorced, she married Toshio Okuwaki, director of such pink films as Bed Dance (1967), which featured an early appearance by Naomi Tani. Okuwaki had been Katori's director in several of her own pink film appearances. A third husband moved with her back to her hometown of Kumamoto, where he went to work for the pharmaceutical company Katori's father had owned. Though she gained a child from this marriage, she was eventually divorced again."

After her third divorce, Katori decided to support herself. She first ran a gasoline station, and, as of 2006, was running a company canteen. Reflecting on her role as a pioneering pink film star, Katori said, "I enjoyed my acting, but I never really got used to the atmosphere of the pink movie business." However, she added, "I've got no regrets about my time in the entertainment world. I'd still go back there now to perform if there was a part for this old girl."

Three films that Katori had made in 1969 with her second husband, Toshio Okuwaki were shown at the 2003 Yamagata International Documentary Film Festival. In September 2009, the 1960s careers of Katori and director Giichi Nishihara—working together and separately—were the subject of a retrospective at the Kobe Planet Film Archive. She died in 2015.

== Partial filmography ==
- Market of Flesh (肉体の市場 - Nikutai no Ichiba) (2/27/1962) dir: Satoru Kobayashi
- Okinawan Ghost Story: Upside-Down Ghost / Chinese Ghost Story: Breaking A Coffin (沖縄怪談逆吊り幽霊 支那怪談死棺破り - Okinawa kaidan: Sakaduri Yūrei / China Kaidan: Shikan Yaburi) (6/13/1962) dir: Kobayashi Satoru
- Sweet Trap (甘い罠 - Amai Wana) (9/3/1963) dir: Kōji Wakamatsu
- Tough Girls a.k.a. Savage Women (激しい女たち - Hageshii Onnatachi) (10/1/1963) dir: Kōji Wakamatsu
- A Bitch's Gamble (めす犬の賭け - Mesuinu no Kake) (3/17/1964) dir: Kōji Wakamatsu
- Sex Diary a.k.a. Flesh Actress Diary (肉体女優日記 - Nikutai Joyū Nikki) (11/1965)
- (狙う - Nerau) (1/21/1967) dir: Giichi Nishihara
- (泣き濡れた情事 - Nikinureta Jōji) (3/28/1967) dir: Giichi Nishihara
- Indecent Relationship (乱れた関係 - Midareta Kankei) (5/9/1967) dir: Giichi Nishihara
- Seduction of Flesh a.k.a. Temptation of the Flesh (肉体の誘惑 - Nikutai No Yūwaku) (7/11/1967) dir: Giichi Nishihara
- (桃色電話 - Momoiro Denwa) (8/26/1967) dir: Giichi Nishihara
- Abnormal Reaction: Ecstasy (異常な反応 悶絶 - Ijo na Hanno: Monzetsu) (11/21/1967) dir: Giichi Nishihara
- Female Trap (牝罠 - Mesuwana) (12/1967) dir: Giichi Nishihara
- Misused (Zoku Jōji no Rirekisho) (1967) dir: Kan Mukai
- Staircase of Sex (性の階段 - Sei no Kaidan) (5/1968) dir: Giichi Nishihara
- Ripped Virgin (引裂かれた処女 - Hikisakareta Shojo) (8/1968) dir: Giichi Nishihara
- I Hate the Wedding Night! (初夜が憎い - Shoya ga Nikui!) (10/1968) dir: Takashi Chiba
- (裏切の色事- Uragiri no Irogoto) (12/1968) dir: Giichi Nishihara
- Adultery (婚外情事 - Kongaijoji) (1969) dir: Kōji Wakamatsu
- Despicable Man-Killing Benten (男ごろし 極悪弁天 - Otoko Goroshi Gokuaku Benten) (1969) dir: Mamoru Watanabe
- New Jack and Betty (ニュージャック＆ベティ - Nyū Jakku & Beti) (1969) dir: Isao Okishima
- Sexy Angel (おいろけ天使 - Oiroke Tenshi) (2/1969) dir: Giichi Nishihara
- Sex Jack (性賊 セックスジャック - Seizoku Sekkusujakku) (1970) dir: Kōji Wakamatsu
- Women Hell Song: Shakuhachi Benten (Onna Jigoku Uta: Shakuhachi Benten) (1970) dir: Mamoru Watanabe
- Sex Cycle: The Woman Who Wants to Die (性輪廻 死にたい女 - Segura Magura: Shinitai Onna) (4/1971) dir: Kōji Wakamatsu
- Sex Family (性家族 - Sei Kazoku) (12/1971) dir: Kōji Wakamatsu (star: Junko Miyashita)
- Porno Pilgrimage (ポルノ遍歴 - Porno Henreki) (1969) dir: Mamoru Watanabe

== Television appearances ==
- Playgirl (プレイガール) (TV Tokyo dramatic series) Episode 37, guest appearance

== Sources ==
- Connell, Ryann (March 2, 2006). "Japan's former Pink Princess trades raunchy scenes for rural canteen". Mainichi Shimbun.
- Sharp, Jasper (2008). Behind the Pink Curtain: The Complete History of Japanese Sex Cinema. Guildford: FAB Press. ISBN 978-1-903254-54-7.
- "TAMAKI KATORI". The Complete Index to World Film.
- Tamaki Katori at IMDb
- "香取環 (Tamaki Katori)" (in Japanese). Japanese Movie Database.
- Weisser, Thomas; Yuko Mihara Weisser (1998). Japanese Cinema Encyclopedia: The Sex Films. Miami: Vital Books : Asian Cult Cinema Publications. ISBN 1-889288-52-7.
