= 1965 in Japan =

- Decades: 1940s; 1950s; 1960s; 1970s; 1980s
- See also: Other events of 1965; History of Japan • Timeline • Years

Events from the year 1965 in Japan.

== Incumbents ==
- Emperor: Hirohito
- Prime Minister: Eisaku Satō (Liberal Democratic)
- Chief Cabinet Secretary: Tomisaburo Hashimoto
- Chief Justice of the Supreme Court: Kisaburo Yokota
- President of the House of Representatives: Naka Funada until December 20, Kikuchirō Yamaguchi
- President of the House of Councillors: Yūzō Shigemune

=== Governors ===
- Aichi Prefecture: Mikine Kuwahara
- Akita Prefecture: Yūjirō Obata
- Aomori Prefecture: Shunkichi Takeuchi
- Chiba Prefecture: Taketo Tomonō
- Ehime Prefecture: Sadatake Hisamatsu
- Fukui Prefecture: Eizō Kita
- Fukuoka Prefecture: Taichi Uzaki
- Fukushima Prefecture: Morie Kimura
- Gifu Prefecture: Yukiyasu Matsuno
- Gunma Prefecture: Konroku Kanda
- Hiroshima Prefecture: Iduo Nagano
- Hokkaido: Kingo Machimura
- Hyogo Prefecture: Motohiko Kanai
- Ibaraki Prefecture: Nirō Iwakami
- Ishikawa Prefecture: Yōichi Nakanishi
- Iwate Prefecture: Tadashi Chida
- Kagawa Prefecture: Masanori Kaneko
- Kagoshima Prefecture: Katsushi Terazono
- Kanagawa Prefecture: Iwataro Uchiyama
- Kochi Prefecture: Masumi Mizobuchi
- Kumamoto Prefecture: Kōsaku Teramoto
- Kyoto Prefecture: Torazō Ninagawa
- Mie Prefecture: Satoru Tanaka
- Miyagi Prefecture: Yoshio Miura (until 8 February); Shintaro Takahashi (starting 31 March)
- Miyazaki Prefecture: Hiroshi Kuroki
- Nagano Prefecture: Gon'ichirō Nishizawa
- Nagasaki Prefecture: Katsuya Sato
- Nara Prefecture: Ryozo Okuda
- Niigata Prefecture: Juichiro Tsukada
- Oita Prefecture: Kaoru Kinoshita
- Okayama Prefecture: Takenori Kato
- Osaka Prefecture: Gisen Satō
- Saga Prefecture: Sunao Ikeda
- Saitama Prefecture: Hiroshi Kurihara
- Shiga Prefecture: Kyujiro Taniguchi
- Shiname Prefecture: Choemon Tanabe
- Shizuoka Prefecture: Toshio Saitō
- Tochigi Prefecture: Nobuo Yokokawa
- Tokushima Prefecture: Kikutaro Hara (until 15 September); Yasunobu Takeichi (starting 9 October)
- Tokyo: Ryōtarō Azuma
- Tottori Prefecture: Jirō Ishiba
- Toyama Prefecture: Minoru Yoshida
- Wakayama Prefecture: Shinji Ono
- Yamagata Prefecture: Tōkichi Abiko
- Yamaguchi Prefecture: Masayuki Hashimoto
- Yamanashi Prefecture: Hisashi Amano

== Events ==
- February 14 – An All Nippon Airways Douglas DC-3 aircraft crashes into Mount Nakanoone in Shizuoka Prefecture, killing both occupants of the plane.
- February 22 – A gas explosion at a coal mine in Hokkaido kills 61.
- June 1 – Coal mine explosion in Fukuoka Prefecture kills 237.
- June 22 – Treaty on Basic Relations between Japan and the Republic of Korea signed in Tokyo.
- August 1 – According to an official confirmed report from the Japan Coast Guard, the cruise ship Yasoshima Maru collided with a runaway tugboat and capsized in Osaka Bay, total 20 passenger and crew were lost to lives.
- September 18 – Comet Ikeya–Seki first sighted by Japanese astronomers.
- October 7 – Seven Japanese fishing boat capsized near Agrihan Island by Typhoon Carmen, According to an official confirmed report from the JCG, total 209 crew were fatalities.
- October 15 – Meijō Line begins operations.
- Unknown date – Kyoto Sangyo University was founded.

== Births ==
- January 5 – Rei Sakuma, voice actress
- January 14 – Shouhei Kusaka (Born Hiroshi Tokoro), actor of 1989 Metal Hero Series Kidou Keiji Jiban.
- February 18 – Masaki Saito, former professional baseball pitcher
- March 20 – Taeko Kawata, voice actress
- March 21 – Wakana Yamazaki, voice actress
- April 15 – Sōichi Noguchi, astronaut
- April 22 – Arihiro Hase, actor and voice actor (d. 1996)
- May 2 – Aohisa Takayasu, actor of 1992 Super Sentai Series Kyoryu Sentai Zyuranger.
- May 8 – Momoko Sakura, Japanese manga artist (Chibi Maruko-chan) (d. 2018)
- May 10 – Kiyoyuki Yanada, voice actor
- May 13 – Hikari Ōta, comedian
- May 23 – Kappei Yamaguchi, voice actor
- May 24 – Shinichiro Watanabe, anime director
- May 31 – Yōko Sōmi, voice actress
- June 6 – Megumi Ogata, voice actress and singer
- June 11 – Yasuko Sawaguchi, actress
- July 3 – Shinya Hashimoto, professional wrestler (d. 2005)
- July 13 – Akina Nakamori, pop singer and actress.
- August 2 – Hisanobu Watanabe, baseball player and coach
- August 18
  - Kōji Kikkawa, singer
  - Ikue Ōtani, voice actress
- August 28 – Satoshi Tajiri, video game designer, creator of Pokémon
- September 27 – Robert Baldwin, actor
- October 4 – Michiko Neya, voice actress
- October 7 – Kumiko Watanabe, voice actress
- November 20
  - Yoshiki, rock composer, pianist and drummer (X Japan)
  - Takeshi Kusao, voice actor
- November 21 – Yuriko Yamaguchi, voice actress
- November 29 – Yutaka Ozaki, songwriter and rock star (d. 1992)
- November 30 – Fumihito, Crown Prince of Japan
- December 7 – Teruyuki Kagawa, actor
- December 8 – Kotono Mitsuishi, voice actress
- December 26 – Toshihide Wakamatsu, actor of 1991 Super Sentai Series Chojin Sentai Jetman.

== Deaths ==
- March 4 – Hachirō Arita, politician (b. 1884)
- July 19 – Haruo Umezaki, writer (b. 1915)
- July 28 – Rampo Edogawa, author and critic (b. 1894)
- July 30 – Jun'ichirō Tanizaki, writer, novelist (b. 1886)
- August 13 – Hayato Ikeda, Prime Minister (b. 1899)
- December 27 – Morita Fukui, lawyer, prosecutor, politician and first Commissioner of baseball in Japan (b. 1885)
- December 29 – Kosaku Yamada, composer and conductor (b. 1886)

== See also ==
- 1965 in Japanese television
- List of Japanese films of 1965
- 1965 in Japanese music
