= 1965 in Japanese music =

In 1965 (Shōwa 40), Japanese music was released on records, and there were charts, awards, contests and festivals.

During that year, Japan continued to have the third largest music market in the world.

== Awards, contests and festivals ==
The 8th Osaka International Festival (Japanese: 大阪国際フェスティバル) was held from 12 April to 2 May 1965. The 7th Japan Record Awards were held on 25 December 1965. The 16th NHK Kōhaku Uta Gassen was held on 31 December 1965.

The 14th Otaka prize was won by Michio Mamiya.

== Number one singles ==
=== Billboard ===
The following reached number 1 according to weekly singles charts published in Billboard:

- 2 January, 9 January, 16 January, 23 January, 30 January, 6 February and 13 February: Ozashiki Kouta - Mahina Stars and Matsuo Kazuko
- 20 February: Anko Tsubaki Wa Koi No Hana - Harumi Miyako
- 27 February, 6 March, 13 March, 20 March and 27 March: La plus belle pour aller danser - Sylvie Vartan
- 3 April, 10 April, 17 April, 24 April, 1 May, 8 May, 15 May, 22 May, 29 May and 5 June: Matsunoki Kouta (Japanese: まつのき小唄) - Yukiko Ninomiya (King) and Toshio Mishima (Columbia)
- 12 June: Abashiri Bangaichi - Ken Takakura (Teichiku) and Kazuo Shirane (Toshiba)
- 19 June, 26 June, 3 July, 10 July, 17 July, 24 July, 31 July, 7 August, 14 August, 21 August, 28 August, 4 September, 11 September, 18 September and 2 October: Onna Gokoro No Uta - Bob Satake
- 9 October, 16 October, 23 October, 30 October, 6 November, 13 November, 20 November, 27 November, 4 December: Aishite Aishite Aishichattanoyo - Mahina Stars and Miyoko Tashiro
- 11 December, 18 December, 25 December: Futari No Sekai - Yūjirō Ishihara (Theme song of the film Futari No Sekai)

Sega Enterprises

The following reached number 1 according to the weekly Sega Enterprises singles chart published in Billboard:

- 25 September: Onna Gokoro No Uta - Bob Satake

=== Cash Box ===
Local

The following reached number 1 according to the weekly local singles chart published in Cash Box:

- 2 January, 9 January, 16 January, 23 January, 30 January, 6 February, 13 February, 20 February, 27 February, 6 March, 13 March, 20 March, 27 March and 3 April: Ozashiki Kouta - Mahina Stars and Matsuo Kazuko
- 10 April, 17 April, 24 April, 1 May, 8 May, 15 May and 22 May: Matsunoki Kouta (Japanese: まつのき小唄) - Yukiko Ninomiya (King), Yukiji Asaoka (Toshiba) and Toshio Mishima (Columbia)
- 29 May, 5 June and 12 June: Abashiri Bangaichi - Ken Takakura
- 19 June, 26 June, 3 July, 10 July, 31 July, 7 August, 14 August, 21 August, 28 August and 4 September: Onna Gokoro No Uta - Bob Satake
- 11 September, 18 September, 25 September, 2 October, 9 October, 16 October, 23 October, 30 October, 6 November, 13 November, 20 November, 27 November, 4 December, 11 December and 18 December: Aishite Aishite Aishichattanoyo - Mahina Stars and Miyoko Tashiro
- 25 December: Namida No Renraku-sen - Harumi Miyako

International

The following reached number 1 according to the weekly international singles chart published in Cash Box:

- 2 January, 9 January, 16 January and 23 January: Soundtrack of La Ragazza Di Bube
- 30 January, 6 February, 13 February, 20 February, 27 February and 6 March: La plus belle pour aller danser - Sylvie Vartan (Victor) and Mie Nakao (Victor)
- 13 March, 20 March, 27 March, 3 April, 10 April and 17 April: Un buco nella sabbia - Mina (Fontana), Mieko Hirota (Columbia), Aiko Ito (Victor) and Sumiko Sakamoto (Toshiba)
- 24 April and 1 May: Diamond Head - The Ventures
- 8 May, 15 May and 22 May: Slaughter on 10th Avenue - The Ventures (Liberty) and Chappell (Folster)
- 29 May, 5 June and 12 June: Goldfinger - Shirley Bassey (UA), John Barry and his Orchestra (UA) and The Astronauts (RCA)
- 19 June: Do the Clam - Elvis Presley
- 26 June: Ticket to Ride - The Beatles
- 3 July, 10 July and 31 July: Dynamite - Cliff Richard
- 7 August and 14 August: Pearly Shells - Billy Vaughn
- 21 August, 28 August, 4 September, 11 September, 18 September, 25 September, 2 October and 9 October: Caravan - The Ventures
- 16 October, 23 October, 30 October and 6 November: Help! - The Beatles
- 13 November, 20 November, 27 November, 4 December, 11 December, 18 December: Poupée de cire, poupée de son - France Gall
- 25 December: Namida-Kun Sayonara - Johnny Tillotson (MGM) and Kyu Sakamoto (Toshiba)

== Annual charts ==
Hibari Misora's Yawara was number 1 in the Japanese kayokyoku annual singles chart published in Billboard.

== Classical music ==
The Tokyo Metropolitan Symphony Orchestra was founded.
The Japanese conductor Seiji Ozawa is named the fourth music director of the Toronto Symphony Orchestra.

== Electric guitars ==
There was an electric boom (Japanese: エレキブーム, ereki būmu) in the popularity and sales of electric guitar music and electric guitars. This was also called the "electric guitar boom" and the "electric guitar fad".

== Disco ==
The first discotheque opened on 18 November 1965.

== Film and television ==
The music of Tokyo Olympiad by Toshiro Mayuzumi won the 20th Mainichi Film Award for Best Music.

== Music industry ==
From April to September, $35.3 million worth of records were sold by the Japan Phonograph and Record Association. The music market was larger than Latin America's.

== Debuts ==
- Akiko Nakamura

== See also ==
- Timeline of Japanese music
- 1965 in Japan
- 1965 in music
- w:ja:1965年の音楽
