= Torawakamaru the Koga Ninja =

- Original Japanese movie poster
- Directed by: Tadashi Sawashima
- Written by: Tadashi Ogawa (screenplay); Jun'ichirō Tanizaki (story)
- Produced by: Toei Company
- Release date: December 15, 1957 (Japan)
- Running time: 63 minutes
- Country: Japan
- Language: Japanese

Torawakamaru the Koga Ninja (Japanese: 忍術御前試合, Hepburn: Ninjutsu gozen-jiai) is a black-and-white Japanese film directed by Tadashi Sawashima.
