= 1966 in Japanese television =

Events in 1966 in Japanese television.

== Channels ==
Launches:

- April 1 - Nippon News Network

== Debuts ==
Show	Station	Premiere Date	Genre	Original Run
Ambassador Magma	Fuji TV	July 4	tokusatsu	July 4, 1966 – September 25, 1967
New Jungle Emperor: Go Ahead Leo!	Fuji TV	October 5	anime	October 5, 1966 – March 29, 1967
Ultra Q	TBS	January 2	tokusatsu	January 2, 1966 – July 3, 1966
Ultraman	TBS	July 17	tokusatsu	July 17, 1966 – April 9, 1967

== Ongoing shows ==
- Music Fair, music (1964–present)
- Hyokkori Hyō Tanjima, anime (1964-1969)
- Obake no Q-tarō, anime (1965-1967)

== Endings ==
Show	Station	Ending Date	Genre	Original Run
Jungle Emperor	Fuji TV	September 28	anime	October 6, 1965 - September 28, 1966
Mighty Atom	Fuji TV	December 31	anime	January 1, 1963 - December 31, 1966
Planet Boy Papi	Fuji TV	May 27	anime	June 3, 1965 – May 27, 1966
Space Ace	Fuji TV	April 28	anime	May 8, 1965 - April 28, 1966
Tetsujin 28-go	Fuji TV	May 25	anime	October 20, 1963 – May 25, 1966
Ultra Q	TBS	July 3	tokusatsu	January 2, 1966 – July 3, 1966

== See also ==
- 1966 in anime
- 1966 in Japan
- List of Japanese films of 1966
