= 1965 in Japanese television =

Events in 1965 in Japanese television.

== Debuts ==
Show	Station	Premiere Date	Genre	Original Run
Dolphin Prince	Fuji TV	April 4	anime	April 4, 1965 – April 18, 1965
Jungle Emperor	Fuji TV	October 6	anime	October 6, 1965 – September 28, 1966
Obake no Q-tarō	TBS	August 29	anime	August 29, 1965 – June 28, 1967
Planet Boy Papi	Fuji TV	June 3	anime	June 3, 1965 – May 27, 1966
Space Ace	Fuji TV	May 8	anime	May 8, 1965 – April 28, 1966
Wonder 3	Fuji TV	June 3	anime	June 6, 1965 – June 27, 1966

== Ongoing shows ==
- Mighty Atom, anime (1963-1966)
- Tetsujin 28-go, anime (1963-1966)
- Phantom Agents, anime (1964-1966)
- Hyokkori Hyō Tanjima, anime (1964-1969)
- Music Fair, music (1964–present)

== Endings ==
Show	Station	Ending Date	Genre	Original Run
Big X	TBS	August 3	anime	August 3, 1964 – September 27, 1965
Dolphin Prince	Fuji TV	April 18	anime	April 4, 1965 – April 18, 1965
Galaxy Boy Troop	NHK	April 7	anime	April 7, 1963 – April 1, 1965
Shōnen Ninja Kaze no Fujimaru	NET	June 7	anime	June 7, 1964 – August 31, 1965
Shinobi no Mono	NET	July 24	drama	July 24, 1964 – July 30, 1965

== See also ==
- 1965 in anime
- 1965 in Japan
- List of Japanese films of 1965
