= Yamanashi Women's Junior College =

- 山梨県立女子短期大学
- Type: Public
- Active: 1966–2006
- President: Naohiro Tsurumi
- Location: Japan
- Nickname: kentan

Yamanashi Women's Junior College (山梨県立女子短期大学, Yamanashi Kenritsu Joshi Tanki Daigaku) was a junior college in Kōfu, Yamanashi, Yamanashi Prefecture, Japan.

The institute was founded in 1966 by Yamanashi Prefecture. Closed at 2006.
