= Kōji Seki =

Japanese pink film director

- Born: September 20, 1911; Tokyo City, Empire of Japan
- Occupation: Film director
- Years active: 1962–1985

Kōji Seki (関孝二, Seki Kōji) aka Takashi Seki (関孝司 or 関孝志, Seki Takashi) (born September 20, 1911, date of death unknown) was a Japanese film director, known for his pioneering work in the pink film genre. Among the accomplishments of Seki's career: he directed the first pink films for Kokuei, the oldest pink film company, Japan's first 3-D film, the world's first 3-D sex film, and Japan's first "invisible man" pink film.

== Life and career ==
=== Early life ===
Seki was born on September 20, 1911, near Kaminarimon in the Asakusa neighborhood of Tokyo, Japan. His father was in the construction business. After graduating from high school in 1930, Seki attended the Tokyo School of Fine Arts (merged into Tokyo University of the Arts in 1949), dropping out after one year. In 1937 he joined his father in working in the prop department of Ōizumi Films, a studio which was purchased by Toei Company in 1951. He eventually became deputy director for large props at the studio. He moved to Beijing where he worked with the North China Electric Co. before he was drafted into the army.

Returning to Japan after the war, Seki joined Radio Film Company (ラジオ映画)). His career as a director began here, where he filmed children's television documentaries focusing on nature and animals. Seki's films of this time bore such titles as Animal Story (どうぶつ物語), The World of Little Monsters (小さな怪物の世界) and Japanese Aesop's Fables (ニッポン・イソップ物語).

=== Pink film career ===
Kokuei, currently the oldest existing pink film studio, was founded in 1955 by Teruo Yamoto. The company began concentrating on sex films—imported films and filmed strip shows—in 1957. With the advent of the pink film genre in 1962, the studio decided to make a series of films which would exploit the nudity now possible in theatrical features by featuring semi-nude actresses in natural settings. With Seki's experience in nature and animal photography, he was hired as the director of these "Female Tarzan" films, the studio's first films in the pink genre. Seki's directorial debut was with Valley of Lust (情欲の谷間, Jōyoku no tanima) filmed in 1962—the year of Satoru Kobayashi's Flesh Market, the first film in the pink genre—and released in 1963. Through Valley of Lust, Seki was indirectly responsible for the name pinku eiga applied to Japanese theatrical softcore films. The films were called eroductions during most of the 1960s. In a review of Valley of Lust in the sports paper Naigai Times, writer Minoru Murai suggested that the genre should have a "Pink Ribbon Award" as an equivalent of the mainstream "Blue Ribbon" award given to films by the paper. The color pink was meant to suggest the blushing that the films induced in viewers. Seki filmed a sequel the year of the first film's release, Cave of Lust (情欲の洞窟, Jōyoku no dōkutsu) (1963).

In 1964, Seki directed writer Oniroku Dan's sister, Miyoko Kuroiwa, in the pink film House of Blind Lust (痴情の家). Kuroizawa was best known as a jazz singer. Seki gave future S&M Queen Naomi Tani her film debut with Special (スペシャル, Supesharu) (1967). He also became associated with Noriko Tatsumi, who is considered the first Queen of Japanese sex films. He directed Tatsumi in some of her best-known films, including Whore (1967) and Erotic Culture Shock: Swapping Partners (1969). Seki's 1967 film Perverted Criminal (変態魔, Hentaima) was Japan's first 3-D film, and, according to Allmovie, the world's first 3-D sex film. A story of a policeman's hunt for a rapist-murderer, this predominantly black & white film emphasizes the murders with color in addition to the 3-D. Comparing it to the later U.S. 3-D sexploitation film The Stewardesses (1969), Allmovie calls Hentaima "an altogether more gruesome affair featuring brutal rape, murder, and necrophilia." Seki remade the film as Abnormal Sex Crimes (Ijō sei hanzai, 1969). Seki's 1968 film, Invisible Man: Dr. Eros (透明人間・エロ博士, Tomei ningen: ero hakase) was the first pink film with an "invisible man" theme. The film has a military doctor who discovers how to make himself invisible. He uses this ability to peek on bathing women, and to execute robberies. The film inspired three sequels.

== Partial filmography ==
Title	Release date	Starring	Studio	Notes
Valley of Lust 情欲の谷間; Jōyoku no tanima	1963	Kazuko Mine	Kokuei	B/W; Inspired the Pink film label later applied to the eroduction
Cave of Lust 情欲の洞窟; Jōyoku no dōkutsu	1963-10	Aki Ema (as Minami Numajiri)	Kokuei	B/W
House of Blind Lust 痴情の家; Chijō no ie	1964-09-01	Miyoko Kuroiwa; Keiko Tachibana	Kokuei	B/W; 79 min.
Special スペシャル; Supesharu	1967-04	Rika Koyanagi; Naomi Tani; Noriko Tatsumi; Reiko Ōtsuki	Shin Nihon Eiga	Part color
Perverted Criminal 変態魔; Hentaima	1967-12-26	Setsu Shimizu; Shūhei Muto	Nippon Cinema	Part color The first 3-D sex film & Japan's first 3-D film
Abnormal Sex Crimes; Ijō sei hanzai	1968 (or 1969)	Mari Nagisa; Kohei Tsuzaki; Nami Katsura	Yamoto	Remake of Perverted Criminal (1967)
Erotic Culture Shock: Swapping Partners エロチック風土記替え床; Erotic fudoki - kaedoko	1968-06	Kazuko Takatori; Jun Kitamura; Noriko Tatsumi; Reiko Akikawa	Shin Nihon Eiga	Part color 71 min.
Molester Invisible Man 痴漢透明人間; Chikan tōmei ningen	1977-05	Yuzuru Ichimura; Sanae Shiba; Kayoko Sugi	Shintōhō Eiga	Color; 62 min.
Molester Invisible Man Part II: Women, Women, Women 痴漢透明人間ＰＡＲＴ II 女女女; Chikan tōmei ningen part II: onna onna onna	1977-10	Masayoshi Nogami; Etsuko Hara; Yumi Okazaki	Shintōhō Eiga	Color; 60 min.
Molester Invisible Man Part 3: Obscene? 痴漢透明人間ＰＡＲＴ３わいせつ？ Chikan tōmei ningen part III waisetsu?	1979-05	Kin'ichi Kusumi; Mayumi Sanjō	Shintōhō Eiga	Color; 60 min.

== Bibliography ==
=== English ===
- "KOJI SEKI". Complete Index to World Film.
- Koji Seki at IMDb
- Sharp, Jasper (2008). Behind the Pink Curtain: The Complete History of Japanese Sex Cinema. Guildford: FAB Press. pp. 48–49, 359. ISBN 978-1-903254-54-7.
- Weisser, Thomas; Yuko Mihara Weisser (1998). Japanese Cinema Encyclopedia: The Sex Films. Miami: Vital Books : Asian Cult Cinema Publications. ISBN 1-889288-52-7.

=== Japanese ===
- Kawashima (December 1976). "日本映画監督全集: 関孝二（せき こうじ） (Japanese Film Directors Complete: Koji Seki)". Kinema Junpo. Archived from the original on 2012-04-04.
- "関孝二 (Kōji Seki)" (in Japanese). allcinema.net.
- 関孝二 (in Japanese). Japanese Movie Database.
