= Giichi Nishihara =

Japanese film director and actor

- Born: 1929; Osaka, Japan
- Died: 16 August 2009 (aged 80)
- Other name: Shirō Sekiya
- Occupations: Film director, producer, cinematographer and screenwriter
- Years active: 1965–1986

Giichi Nishihara (西原 儀一, Nishihara Giichi; 1929 – 16 August 2009), also known as Shirō Sekiya (関谷四郎, Sekiya Shirō), was a Japanese film director, screenwriter, producer and actor best known for his low-budget and sensationalistic pink films made for his Aoi Eiga studios in the 1960s and 1970s. He has been called both "Japan's sleaziest movie-maker," and "a cult favorite among devotees of extreme cinema."

== Life and career ==
=== Early career ===
Born in 1929, Nishihara worked as a professional boxer during the early post-World War II years. His success in this capacity led to his entry to the film industry as an actor, playing the role of a fighter in director Kōzō Saeki's 1947 Daiei film, Town Of The Iron Fist or Street of Iron Fists (Tekken No Machi). Nishihara served as Saeki's assistant director in the 1949 film, Morning Star Song (歌の明星). In the early years of his career he worked as an actor and freelance filmmaker for several studios besides Daiei, including Shochiku, Mainichi Television and NHK.

=== Pink film and Aoi Eiga Studios ===
The first Japanese film to contain nudity, director Satoru Kobayashi's controversial Flesh Market, was released in 1962. It was shut down by the police and censored before it could be re-released, but the film became a huge box-office success. Even with the limited distribution it received as an independent production, Flesh Market, which was made for 6-8 million yen, took in over 100 million yen. With the success of this movie, the pink film genre—known as eroductions at the time—had been born. In the pink-boom atmosphere of the mid-1960s, many small studios were set up to produce these cheap and profitable softcore pornographic theatrical films. One such studio was Aoi Eiga, founded by Nishihara to produce his own films. Some have claimed the company was a "front" for the Osaka yakuza.

=== 1960s ===
Nishihara made his directorial debut with Highway of Passion (1965). In 1966, Tamaki Katori, star of Flesh Market, joined Aoi Eiga and quickly appeared in many films scripted and directed by Nishihara. To Aim at... (January 1967) was a crime drama, in which Katori is the only survivor after she battles with the three men with whom she has committed a major robbery. Weeping Affair (March 1967) was a melodrama about Katori's relationship with a middle-aged man and his daughter.

Indecent Relationship (May 1967) had Katori as a girl who is financially supporting her boyfriend by working at a hostess bar. When she finds out that the woman who owns the bar and her boyfriend are having an affair, she seeks revenge on them both. The Weissers judge this early work, "More back-alley junk from sleaze-meister Giichi Nishihara."

According to the Japanese Cinema Encyclopedia: The Sex Films, the main difference between Seduction of the Flesh (July 1967) and Nishihara's other "cinematic excesses" is that Katori is raped not once, but twice within the film's 72-minute duration. The story had Katori suffering these assaults while her husband is away, and then committing suicide in shame.

Pink Telephone (August 1967) was an atypical venture into comedy for Nishihara and Tamaki. The story concerns a man whose goal is to become Japan's number-one drunk. Abnormal Reaction: Ecstasy (November 1967), was an erotic thriller in which Katori co-starred as the mistress of a man who has faked his death. When the "widow" discovers that her husband is not actually dead, she gets her revenge by arranging to have both her husband and Katori impaled on stakes while in bed. Japanese Cinema Encyclopedia: The Sex Films calls this a "somewhat restrained early project" for the director, adding, "[t]he violence is fleeting. Even the sex scenes are stilted when compared to Nishihara's later efforts."

Ripped Virgin (1968) had Katori as a high school girl who discovers that the man who raped her is actually her boyfriend. The Weissers judge this film "surprisingly refined" considering that Nishihara is the director. Exploiting the exotic appeal of a white actresses, Nishihara co-starred Katori with two foreign actresses in Aoi Eiga's Staircase of Sex (1968).

=== 1970s ===
Nishihara's main actress, Tamaki Katori, left Aoi Eiga studios in the later 1960s, and then retired in 1972. With her, Nishihara had produced countless films for the studio which were profitable, but were not notably successful. It was not until he teamed up with actress Yuri Izumi in the early 1970s, that he began directing box-office hits. According to some Japanese sources, Nishihara and Izumi are married.

In the later half of the decade Nishihara and Izumi began making films for the major pink film studio Shintōhō Eiga. Nishihara's films for this studio include such titles as Please Rape Me Once More (starring Izumi) and Grotesque Perverted Slaughter (both 1976). About the latter film, the Weissers, in their Japanese Cinema Encyclopedia: The Sex Films report, "This is probably director Nishihara's best film, but that's like choosing from rat-bite fever, jungle rot, or tick-borne typhus. They're all pretty bad." Robert Firsching of Allmovie agrees with the Weisser's assessment, calling the film "Nishihara's most skillful film, as he concentrates on characterization and suspense far more here than in his usual sick rapefests."

His films of this period are noted for their "twisted plots delivered in an unnerving matter-of-fact style." A typical plot of one of Nishihara's "staggering sleaze-fests" of the 1970s can be found in Abnormal Passion Case: Razor (1977). The heroine of this film, Reiko, is worried about her father because he recently had a near-fatal heart attack while the two of them were making love. Out of concerns that he may have a stroke if their sexual relations continue, she goes to a lawyer for advice. The lawyer suggests that she get married so that her father will have to stop having sex with her. The lawyer then proceeds to rape Reiko. The rape is interrupted by a call from the lawyer's girlfriend. The lawyer then tells Reiko she can leave, as he doesn't need to rape her anymore—his girlfriend is coming over. Reiko persuades the lawyer to pretend to be her fiancée so that she can convince her father she's really going to be married. The ruse works only too well. The father believes her, and, in shock and grief, dies of a heart attack on the spot. Reiko then kills the lawyer with a butcher knife.

Nishihara retired from the film industry in 1985. In 2002 he published Yakuza Director (やくざ監督, Yakuza Kantoku), his memoirs which recounted his eventful life and encounters with criminals. In September 2009, the 1960s careers of Nishihara and actress Tamaki Katori—working together and separately—were the subject of a retrospective at the Kobe Planet Film Archive. Summarizing Nishihara's career, Allmovie writes, "No one ever accused Nishihara of being the most subtle filmmaker in the world, but at least he manages to keep the tawdry proceedings lively."

== Partial filmography ==
Title	Release date	Cast	Studio	Notes
Mad Passion Highway 激情のハイウェー; Gekijō no Haiuee	August 1965	Mayumi Aoi; Isao Matsui; Setsuko Moriya	Aoi Eiga	66 min. B&W; Nishihara's directorial debut(?)
To Aim At... 狙う; Nerau	January 21, 1967		Aoi Eiga	
Weeping Affair 泣き濡れた情事; Nakinureta Joji	March 28, 1967		Aoi Eiga	
Indecent Relationship 乱れた関係; Midareta Kankei	May 9, 1967	Tamaki Katori; Koji Satomi; Setsu Shimizu	Aoi Eiga	
Seduction of Flesh a.k.a. Temptation of the Flesh 肉体の誘惑; Nikutai No Yūwaku	July 11, 1967	Tamaki Katori; Chiyo Morizō; Noriko Chizuki; Masayoshi Nogami; Yūichi Minato; Joji Ohara	Aoi Eiga	72 min. Color
Pink Telephone 桃色電話; Momoiro Denwa	August 26, 1967		Aoi Eiga	
Abnormal Reaction: Ecstasy 異常な反応 悶絶; Ijo Na Hanno: Monzetsu	November 21, 1967	Tamaki Katori; Mari Azusa; Teruko Amano; Yasushi Matsura	Aoi Eiga	
Female Trap 牝罠; Mesuwana	December 1967	Tamaki Katori; Michi Nakahara; Chiyo Morizō; Mari Nagisa; Jirō Kokubu	Aoi Eiga	66 min. Part color
Staircase of Sex 性の階段; Sei no Kaidan	May 1968	Tamaki Katori; Edie McNair; Marilyn Weir	Aoi Eiga	71 min. Part color
Ripped Virgin 引裂かれた処女; Hikisakareta Shojo	August 1968	Tamaki Katori; Hiroshi Yajima	Aoi Eiga	
Betrayal of Affairs 裏切の色事; Uragiri no Irogoto	December 1968		Aoi Eiga	
Sexy Angel おいろけ天使; Oiroke Tenshi	February 1969	Tamaki Katori; Kazuko Shirakawa; Setsu Shimizu; Kōhei Tsuzaki; Jōji Ichimura; Kemi Ishiboshi	Aoi Eiga	74 min. Part color
Ghost Story of Sex 性の怪談; Sei No Kaidan	1972	Maki Kirikawa; Hiroshi Nishihara	Aoi Eiga	
The Devil Dwells in a Woman's Valley 女の谷に悪魔が棲む; Onna no Tani ni Akuma ga Sumu	September 1972	Hirimi Naka; Rina Takase; Aki Uehara; Yuri Izumi	Aoi Eiga	70 min. Part color Directed as Shirō Sekiya
Grotesque Perverted Slaughter aka Present-Day Bizarre Sex Crime 現代猟奇性犯罪; Gendai Ryoki Sei Hanzai	August 1976	Keiko Sugi; Kiyoshi Nakayama; Yuri Izumi	Aoi Eiga; Shintōhō Eiga	
Abnormal Passion Case: Razor 異常情痴事件:剃刀; Ijojochi Jiken: Kamisori	1977	Yuri Izumi; Jirō Kakubu	Aoi Eiga	
Please Rape Me Once More もう一度襲る！ Mou Ichido Yaru	January 1979	Yuri Izumi; Maki Kirikawa; Eiji Togawa; Hiroshi Nishihara	Shintōhō Eiga	

== Sources ==
- "Giichi Nishihara". Allmovie. Archived from the original on 26 April 2006.
- Toshio Maruo. "Giichi Nishihara". at The Complete Index to World Film.
- Giichi Nishihara at IMDb
- "西原儀一 (Nishihara Giichi)" (in Japanese). Japanese Movie Database.
- Nishihara, Giichi (2002). やくざ監督 東京進出 (Yakuza Director: Advance on Tokyo) (in Japanese). Wise Publications. ISBN 4-89830-131-2. (Nishihara's autobiography)
- Sharp, Jasper (2008). Behind the Pink Curtain: The Complete History of Japanese Sex Cinema. Guildford: FAB Press. pp. 52, 61, 182, 204, 353, 378. ISBN 978-1-903254-54-7.
- Weisser, Thomas; Yuko Mihara Weisser (1998). Japanese Cinema Encyclopedia: The Sex Films. Miami: Vital Books : Asian Cult Cinema Publications. ISBN 1-889288-52-7.
