= Tadashi Sawashima =

- 沢島 忠
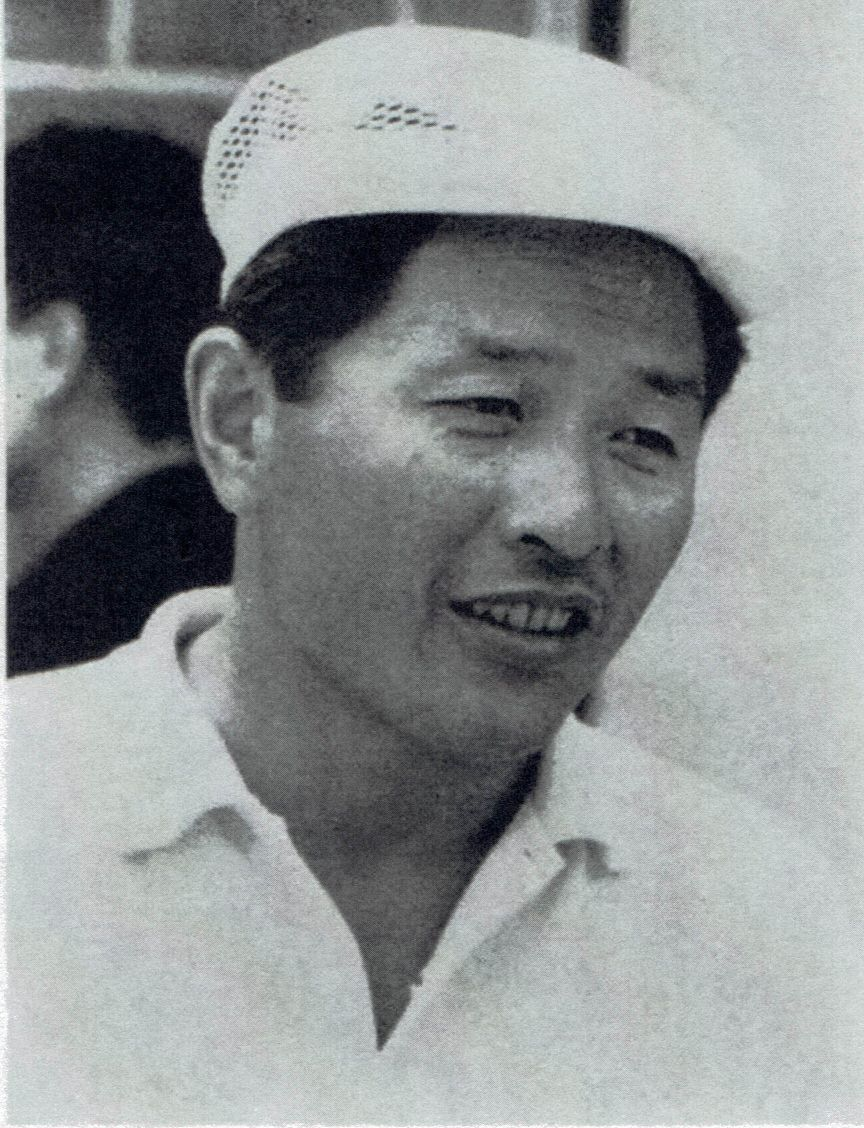
- Born: May 19, 1926; Kotō, Shiga, Japan
- Died: January 27, 2018 (aged 91)
- Occupations: Film director theatre director
- Years active: 1950–1977 (film); 1977–2018 (theatre)
- Known for: Ninkyo eiga films Theater of Life: Hishakaku
- Awards: Japan Academy Prize Special Award (2017)

Tadashi Sawashima (沢島 忠, Sawashima Tadashi) (19 May 1926 – 27 January 2018) was a Japanese film director and theatre director . He worked as a film director from the 1950s to the 1970s. He died on 27 January 2018 at the age of 91 from multiple organ failure.

== Career ==
Sawashima was born in Kotō, Shiga, Japan. He joined the Toei Studio in 1950, where he worked as an assistant director under Masahiro Makino and Kunio Watanabe before making his directional debut in 1957 with Torawakamaru the Koga Ninja. He became known for directing ninkyo eiga film for Toei' as well as jidaigeki production featuring start as Hibari Misora, Chiemi Eri, and Kinnosuke Nakamura. His final film was released in 1977, after which he mainly worked in theater. In his final years, he had been attempting to film a version of the Chushingura story, but did not succeed.

He received a special Award at the 40th Japan Academy Prize in recognition of his career in Japanese cinema.

== Partial filmography ==
He directed 49 films and wrote nine screenplays:

=== As director (partial filmography) ===
- Torawakamaru the Koga Ninja (忍術御前試合 Ninjutsu gozen-jiai) (1957)
- Drunken Sword (1962)
- Jinsei gekijo: Hishakaku (Theater of Life: Hishakaku) (1963)
- Jinsei gekijo: Zoku Hishakaku (Theater of Life: Return of Hishakaku) (1963)
- Jinsei gekijo: Shin Hishakaku (Theater of Life: New Hishakaku Story) (1964)
- Cry of the Mountain (1968)
- Shinsengumi: Assassins of Honor (1969)
- Boruneo taisho: Akamichi ni tokero (1969)
- Akō Rōshi (1979) (TV series) (episodes 1, 2, 12, 13, 33 and 34)

screenplays:
