= 1964 in film =

The year 1964 in film involved some significant events, including three highly successful musical films, Mary Poppins, My Fair Lady, and The Umbrellas of Cherbourg.

== Top-grossing films (U.S.) ==
The top ten 1964 released films by box office gross in North America are as follows:

Highest-grossing films of 1964
Rank	Title	Distributor	Domestic rentals
1	Mary Poppins	Buena Vista	$31,000,000
2	My Fair Lady	Warner Bros.	$30,000,000
3	Goldfinger	United Artists	$22,500,000
4	The Carpetbaggers	Paramount	$15,500,000
5	From Russia With Love	United Artists	$9,200,000
6	A Shot in the Dark	United Artists	$6,748,000
7	What a Way to Go!	20th Century Fox	$6,100,000
8	The Unsinkable Molly Brown	MGM	$6,040,000
9	The Pink Panther	United Artists	$5,935,000
10	A Hard Day's Night	United Artists	$5,800,000

== Events ==
- January 29 – 50-year-old actor Alan Ladd is found dead in bed at his home in Palm Springs, California. An autopsy confirms the cause of death as cerebral edema caused by an acute overdose of "alcohol and three other drugs" His death is ruled accidental. Ladd's final film, The Carpetbaggers, is released in April and, despite mostly negative reviews from critics, becomes a major commercial success.
- March 6 – Elvis Presley's 14th motion picture, Kissin' Cousins, is released to theaters.
- March 15 - Elizabeth Taylor marries Richard Burton.
- June 3 – The animated film Hey There, It's Yogi Bear! is released. Not only it is the first theatrical feature produced by Hanna-Barbera but also the first full-length theatrical animated film based on the animated television program.
- July 6 – A Hard Day's Night, the first Beatles film, premieres.
- August 27 – The film Mary Poppins is released. Not only is it a massive hit with both critics and audiences, but it also becomes Disney's highest-grossing film of all time. It goes on to win five Academy Awards, including Best Actress for Julie Andrews.
- October – In Photoplay magazine, Hedda Hopper announces that Sophia Loren and Paul Newman will star in the film version of Arthur Miller's play After the Fall, with Loren in the role that was written about Marilyn Monroe. The film is never made.

== Awards ==
Academy Awards:

Best Picture: My Fair Lady – Warner Bros.
Best Director: George Cukor – My Fair Lady
Best Actor: Rex Harrison – My Fair Lady
Best Actress: Julie Andrews – Mary Poppins
Best Supporting Actor: Peter Ustinov – Topkapi
Best Supporting Actress: Lila Kedrova – Zorba the Greek
Best Foreign Language Film: Yesterday, Today and Tomorrow (Ieri, oggi, domani), directed by Vittorio De Sica, Italy

Golden Globe Awards:

Drama:
Best Picture: Becket
Best Actor: Peter O'Toole – Becket
Best Actress: Anne Bancroft – The Pumpkin Eater

Comedy or Musical:
Best Picture: My Fair Lady
Best Actor: Rex Harrison – My Fair Lady
Best Actress: Julie Andrews – Mary Poppins

Other
Best Supporting Actor: Edmond O'Brien – Seven Days in May
Best Supporting Actress: Agnes Moorehead – Hush...Hush, Sweet Charlotte
Best Director: George Cukor – My Fair Lady

Palme d'Or (Cannes Film Festival):

Les Parapluies de Cherbourg (The Umbrellas of Cherbourg), directed by Jacques Demy, France

Golden Lion (Venice Film Festival):

Il deserto rosso (The Red Desert), directed by Michelangelo Antonioni, Italy

Golden Bear (Berlin Film Festival):

Susuz Yaz (Dry Summer), directed by Ismail Metin, Turkey

== 1964 film releases ==
United States unless stated

=== January–March ===
- January 1964
  - 19 January
    - Strait-Jacket
  - 22 January
    - The Comedy of Terrors
    - Pyro... The Thing Without a Face
    - Zulu
  - 29 January
    - Dr. Strangelove
    - Man's Favorite Sport?
  - 30 January
    - A Global Affair
    - Surf Party
- February 1964
  - 5 February
    - Man in the Middle
  - 10 February
    - The Incredibly Strange Creatures Who Stopped Living and Became Mixed-Up Zombies
  - 12 February
    - Seven Days in May
  - 19 February
    - Dead Ringer
    - Les Parapluies de Cherbourg
  - 26 February
    - He Rides Tall
- March 1964
  - 6 March
    - Kissin' Cousins
  - 8 March
    - The Last Man on Earth (United States/Italy)
  - 11 March
    - Becket
    - Mail Order Bride
  - 12 March
    - A Tiger Walks
  - 18 March
    - 7 Faces of Dr. Lao
    - The Flesh Eaters
    - Law of the Lawless
    - The Pink Panther
  - 19 March
    - Two Thousand Maniacs!
    - The World of Henry Orient
  - 25 March
    - Flight from Ashiya
    - The Misadventures of Merlin Jones
    - Muscle Beach Party
  - 26 March
    - The Fall of the Roman Empire
  - 28 March
    - The Incredible Mr. Limpet

=== April–June ===
- April 1964
  - 1 April
    - The Curse of the Living Corpse
    - Gunfighters of Casa Grande
  - 3 April
    - Dark Purpose
  - 5 April
    - The Best Man
  - 8 April
    - Paris When It Sizzles
    - The Strangler
  - 9 April
    - The Carpetbaggers
  - 14 April
    - The Quick Gun
  - 21 April
    - The Chalk Garden
    - French Dressing
  - 28 April
    - The Third Secret
    - Woman of Straw
  - 29 April
    - Mothra vs. Godzilla (Japan)
- May 1964
  - 2 May
    - The Bargee
    - The Thin Red Line
  - 6 May
    - The Visit
  - 11 May
    - What a Way to Go!
  - 13 May
    - The Eyes of Annie Jones
  - 14 May
    - Girl with Green Eyes
  - 19 May
    - Signpost to Murder
  - 20 May
    - Black Like Me
    - The Brass Bottle
    - Rhino!
    - Viva Las Vegas
  - 27 May
    - A Distant Trumpet
    - From Russia with Love
  - 29 May
    - 3 Nuts in Search of a Bolt
- June 1964
  - 1 June
    - The Horror of Party Beach
    - The New Interns
  - 3 June
    - For Those Who Think Young
    - Hey There, It's Yogi Bear!
    - Honeymoon Hotel
  - 4 June
    - 633 Squadron
    - The Three Lives of Thomasina
  - 10 June
    - Advance to the Rear
    - Bedtime Story
    - McHale's Navy
    - Wild and Wonderful
  - 11 June
    - The Unsinkable Molly Brown
  - 17 June
    - Robinson Crusoe on Mars
  - 23 June
    - A Shot in the Dark
    - The Young Lovers
  - 24 June
    - Flipper's New Adventure
    - The Masque of the Red Death
    - Robin and the 7 Hoods
  - 25 June
    - Circus World
  - 26 June
    - The Cavern

=== July–September ===
- July 1964
  - 2 July
    - The Moon-Spinners
    - The Pawnbroker
  - 3 July
    - Island of the Blue Dolphins
  - 6 July
    - A Hard Day's Night
  - 7 July
    - The Killers
  - 8 July
    - Lady in a Cage
  - 22 July
    - Bikini Beach
    - Good Neighbor Sam
    - Marnie
    - Shock Treatment
  - 29 July
    - Carry On Spying
    - One Potato, Two Potato
- August 1964
  - 5 August
    - Ride the Wild Surf
  - 6 August
    - The Night of the Iguana
  - 11 August
    - Crooks in Cloisters
    - Dogora (Japan)
  - 12 August
    - A House Is Not a Home
    - The Patsy
  - 14 August
    - Behold a Pale Horse
  - 16 August
    - Diary of a Bachelor
  - 26 August
    - The Beauty Jungle
    - I'd Rather Be Rich
  - 27 August
    - Mary Poppins
- September 1964
  - 2 September
    - The 7th Dawn
    - Bullet for a Badman
    - The Comedy Man
    - Topkapi
  - 4 September
    - The Gospel According to St. Matthew (Italy)
  - 11 September
    - Lorna
  - 12 September
    - A Fistful of Dollars (Italy)
  - 16 September
    - The Secret Invasion
  - 18 September
    - Goldfinger
  - 19 September
    - Nothing but a Man
  - 25 September
    - Fanny Hill
  - 27 September
    - Lilith

=== October–December ===
- October 1964
  - 3 October
    - Cheyenne Autumn
  - 7 October
    - Fail-Safe
  - 8 October
    - The Outrage
  - 11 October
    - Blood on the Arrow
    - The System
  - 14 October
    - Invitation to a Gunfighter
    - Send Me No Flowers
  - 20 October
    - The Black Torment
  - 24 October
    - The Lively Set
  - 27 October
    - The Americanization of Emily
  - 28 October
    - Rio Conchos
  - 29 October
    - The Naked Kiss
    - The Time Travelers
    - The Train
- November 1964
  - 2 November
    - Where Love Has Gone
  - 4 November
    - Kitten with a Whip
    - Youngblood Hawke
    - Your Cheatin' Heart
  - 5 November
    - Flight to Fury
  - 8 November
    - Fate Is the Hunter
  - 9 November
    - My Fair Lady
  - 10 November
    - Roustabout
    - Stage to Thunder Rock
  - 11 November
    - Pajama Party
  - 15 November
    - Back Door to Hell
  - 18 November
    - Goodbye Charlie
  - 21 November
    - Four Days in November
  - 25 November
    - Ensign Pulver
  - 26 November
    - Apache Rifles
  - 27 November
    - Looking for Love
- December 1964
  - 3 December
    - Dear Heart
  - 4 December
    - Kisses for My President
  - 10 December
    - Carry On Cleo
    - Father Goose
    - The Golden Head
  - 12 December
    - Raiders from Beneath the Sea
  - 16 December
    - The Disorderly Orderly
    - Hush...Hush, Sweet Charlotte
    - Zorba the Greek
  - 18 December
    - Emil and the Detectives
    - Get Yourself a College Girl
  - 20 December
    - Ghidorah, the Three-Headed Monster (Japan)
  - 22 December
    - Kiss Me, Stupid
  - 25 December
    - The Pleasure Seekers
    - Sex and the Single Girl
  - 28 December
    - Carol for Another Christmas
  - 30 December
    - The Night Walker

== Notable films released in 1964 ==
United States unless stated

=== # ===
- 3 Nuts in Search of a Bolt, starring Mamie Van Doren and Tommy Noonan
- 7 Faces of Dr. Lao, starring Tony Randall, Barbara Eden and Arthur O'Connell, with special effects by George Pal
- The 7th Dawn, starring William Holden and Susannah York
- 633 Squadron, starring Cliff Robertson, George Chakiris and Maria Perschy – (U.K.)

=== A ===
- Advance to the Rear, directed by George Marshall, starring Glenn Ford, Stella Stevens and Melvyn Douglas
- Adventures of Zatoichi (Zatōichi sekisho-yaburi), directed by Kimiyoshi Yasuda – (Japan)
- Ali Baba and the Seven Saracens
- The Alive and the Dead (Zhivye i myortvye) – (U.S.S.R.)
- All These Women (För att inte tala om alla dessa kvinnor), directed by Ingmar Bergman – (Sweden)
- The Americanization of Emily, directed by Arthur Hiller, starring James Garner and Julie Andrews
- Anatomy of a Marriage: My Days with Françoise, directed by André Cayatte – (France)
- Anatomy of a Marriage: My Days with Jean-Marc, directed by André Cayatte – (France)
- The Ape Woman (La donna scimmia), starring Ugo Tognazzi and Annie Girardot – (Italy/France)
- Assassination (Ansatu) – (Japan)
- At Midnight I'll Take Your Soul (À Meia-Noite Levarei Sua Alma) – (Brazil)
- Atentát – (Czechoslovakia)
- A Trip to the Moon
- Ayee Milan Ki Bela – (India)

=== B ===
- Back Door to Hell, starring Jimmie Rodgers and Jack Nicholson
- Backfire (Échappement libre), starring Jean-Paul Belmondo and Jean Seberg – (France)
- Ballad in Blue, directed by Paul Henreid and starring Ray Charles
- Band of Outsiders (Bande à part), directed by Jean-Luc Godard – (France)
- The Bargee, starring Harry H. Corbett and Eric Sykes – (U.K.)
- The Beauty Jungle, starring Ian Hendry – (U.K.)
- Becket, directed by Peter Glenville, starring Peter O'Toole and Richard Burton – (U.K./U.S.)
- Bedtime Story, starring Marlon Brando, David Niven and Shirley Jones
- Before the Revolution (Prima della rivoluzione), directed by Bernardo Bertolucci – (Italy)
- Behold a Pale Horse, directed by Fred Zinnemann, starring Gregory Peck, Anthony Quinn, Omar Sharif
- Belarmino, a Cinema Novo docufiction – (Portugal)
- The Best Man, directed by Franklin J. Schaffner, written by Gore Vidal, starring Henry Fonda and Cliff Robertson
- Bikini Beach, starring Frankie Avalon, Annette Funicello, Martha Hyer and Don Rickles
- Black God, White Devil (Deus e o Diabo na terra do sol) – (Brazil)
- Black Like Me, starring James Whitmore and Roscoe Lee Browne
- Black Peter (Cerný Petr), directed by Miloš Forman – (Czechoslovakia)
- The Black Torment, directed by Robert Hartford-Davis – (U.K.)
- Blood and Black Lace (6 donne per l'assassino), directed by Mario Bava – (Italy)
- Blood on the Arrow, directed by Sidney Salkow and starring Dale Robertson and Martha Hyer
- La bonne soupe (a.k.a. Careless Love), directed by Robert Thomas – (Italy/France)
- The Brass Bottle, starring Tony Randall, Burl Ives and Barbara Eden
- Bullet for a Badman, starring Audie Murphy, Darren McGavin and Ruta Lee

=== C ===
- A Carol for Another Christmas, starring Peter Sellers and Britt Ekland
- The Carpetbaggers, starring George Peppard, Carroll Baker and Elizabeth Ashley
- Carry On Cleo, starring Sid James and Amanda Barrie – (U.K.)
- Carry On Jack, starring Kenneth Williams and Bernard Cribbins – (U.K.)
- Carry On Spying, starring Kenneth Williams and Barbara Windsor – (U.K.)
- Castle of Blood (Danza macabra), directed by Antonio Margheriti and Sergio Corbucci – (Italy/France)
- Castle of the Living Dead (Il castello dei morti vivi), directed by Warren Kiefer – (Italy/France)
- The Chairman (Predsedatel) – (U.S.S.R.)
- The Chalk Garden, starring Deborah Kerr and Hayley Mills – (U.K.)
- Charulata, directed by Satyajit Ray – (India)
- Cheyenne Autumn, directed by John Ford, starring Carroll Baker, Richard Widmark, Edward G. Robinson and Karl Malden
- Circle of Love (La ronde), directed by Roger Vadim and starring Jane Fonda – (France)
- Circus World, starring John Wayne, Claudia Cardinale and Rita Hayworth
- The Comedy Man, starring Kenneth More and Cecil Parker – (U.K.)
- The Comedy of Terrors, starring Vincent Price, Peter Lorre, Boris Karloff, Basil Rathbone
- Crooks in Cloisters, starring Ronald Fraser and Barbara Windsor – (U.K.)
- The Curse of the Hidden Vault (Die Gruft mit dem Rätselschloß), directed by Franz Josef Gottlieb – (West Germany)
- The Curse of the Living Corpse, produced, written and directed by Del Tenney
- The Curse of the Mummy's Tomb, directed by Michael Carreras – (U.K.)

=== D ===
- Dark Purpose, starring Shirley Jones
- Dead Ringer, starring Bette Davis, Peter Lawford
- Dear Heart, directed by Delbert Mann, starring Geraldine Page, Glenn Ford and Angela Lansbury
- Dear John (Käre John), directed by Lars-Magnus Lindgren – (Sweden)
- Devil Doll, directed by Lindsay Shonteff – (U.K.)
- The Devil-Ship Pirates, starring Christopher Lee and Andrew Keir
- Diamonds of the Night (Démanty noci), directed by Jan Němec – (Czechoslovakia)
- Diary of a Bachelor, directed by Sandy Howard, starring William Traylor, Joe Silver and Dagne Crane
- Diary of a Chambermaid (Le journal d'une femme de chambre), directed by Luis Buñuel, starring Jeanne Moreau and Michel Piccoli – (France)
- The Disorderly Orderly, directed by Frank Tashlin, starring Jerry Lewis and Susan Oliver
- A Distant Trumpet, starring Troy Donahue, Suzanne Pleshette and Diane McBain
- Dog Eat Dog (Einer frisst den anderen), starring Jayne Mansfield – (West Germany/Italy/Liechtenstein)
- Dogora (a.k.a. Uchū Daikaijū Dogora), directed by Ishirō Honda – (Japan)
- Dosti (Friendship), directed by Satyen Bose – (India)
- Dr. Crippen, starring Donald Pleasence – (U.K.)
- Dr. Sex, directed by Ted V. Mikels
- Dr. Strangelove or: How I Learned to Stop Worrying and Love the Bomb, directed by Stanley Kubrick, starring Peter Sellers (in three roles) and George C. Scott – (U.K.)
- Dry Summer (Susuz Yaz), directed by Metin Erksan – (Turkey)

=== E ===
- The Earth Dies Screaming, starring Willard Parker, Virginia Field and Dennis Price – (U.K.)
- East of Sudan, starring Anthony Quayle, Sylvia Syms and Jenny Agutter – (U.K.)
- Empire, directed by Andy Warhol
- Ensign Pulver, a sequel to Mister Roberts, starring Robert Walker Jr. and Burl Ives
- El extraño viaje (The Strange Voyage), directed by Fernando Fernán Gómez – (Spain)
- The Evil of Frankenstein, directed by Freddie Francis – (U.K.)
- The Evil Stairs (마의 계단, Ma-ui gyedan), directed by Lee Man-hee – (South Korea)
- The Eyes of Annie Jones, starring Richard Conte and Francesca Annis – (U.K.)

=== F ===
- Face of the Screaming Werewolf, starring Lon Chaney – (Mexico/U.S.)
- Fail-Safe, directed by Sidney Lumet, starring Henry Fonda, Dan O'Herlihy and Walter Matthau
- The Fall of the Roman Empire, starring Sophia Loren, Stephen Boyd and Alec Guinness
- Fanny Hill, directed by Russ Meyer – (West Germany/U.S.)
- Fantômas, starring Jean Marais – (France)
- Fate Is the Hunter, starring Glenn Ford, Rod Taylor and Suzanne Pleshette
- Father Came Too!, starring James Robertson Justice, Leslie Phillips and Stanley Baxter – (U.K.)
- Father Goose, starring Cary Grant, Leslie Caron and Trevor Howard
- Father of a Soldier (Jariskats'is mama), directed by Revaz Chkheidze – (Georgia)
- The Fifth Horseman Is Fear (A Paty Jezdec je Strach), directed by Zbyněk Brynych – (Czechoslovakia)
- Fight, Zatoichi, Fight (Zatōichi kesshō-tabi), directed by Kenji Misumi – (Japan)
- First Men in the Moon, starring Edward Judd and Lionel Jeffries, with special effects by Ray Harryhausen – (U.K.)
- A Fistful of Dollars, directed by Sergio Leone, starring Clint Eastwood – (Italy)
- The Flesh Eaters, starring Martin Kosleck
- Flight from Ashiya, starring Yul Brynner and Richard Widmark
- Flipper's New Adventure, starring Luke Halpin and Pamela Franklin
- The Flower and the Angry Waves (Hana to dotō), directed by Seijun Suzuki – (Japan)
- For Men Only, directed by Mahmoud Zulfikar, starring Soad Hosny and Nadia Lutfi – (Egypt)
- For Those Who Think Young, starring Pamela Tiffin and James Darren
- Forest of the Hanged (Pădurea spânzuraţilor), directed by Liviu Ciulei – (Romania)
- Four Days in November, a documentary directed by Mel Stuart

=== G ===
- Gate of Flesh (Nikutai no mon), directed by Seijun Suzuki – (Japan)
- Gertrud, directed by Carl Theodor Dreyer – (Denmark)
- Get Yourself a College Girl, starring Mary Ann Mobley and Nancy Sinatra
- Ghidorah, the Three-Headed Monster (San Daikaijū: Chikyū Saidai no Kessen) – (Japan)
- The Ghost of Sierra de Cobre, starring Martin Landau, Judith Anderson and Diane Baker
- Girl with Green Eyes, starring Peter Finch and Rita Tushingham – (U.K.)
- A Global Affair, starring Bob Hope
- Goldfinger, starring Sean Connery as James Bond), with Honor Blackman, Shirley Eaton and Gert Fröbe – (U.K.)
- Goodbye Charlie, starring Debbie Reynolds, Tony Curtis and Pat Boone
- Good Neighbor Sam, starring Jack Lemmon and Romy Schneider
- The Gorgon, starring Peter Cushing, Barbara Shelley and Christopher Lee – (U.K.)
- The Gospel According to St. Matthew (Il vangelo secondo Matteo), directed by Pier Paolo Pasolini – (Italy)
- Greed in the Sun (Cent mille dollars au soleil), starring Jean-Paul Belmondo – (France)
- The Guns (Os Fuzis), directed by Ruy Guerra – (Brazil/Argentina)
- Guns at Batasi, starring Richard Attenborough and Jack Hawkins – (U.K.)
- The Guns of August, a documentary directed by Nathan Kroll and narrated by Fritz Weaver

=== H ===
- Hamlet (a.k.a. Richard Burton's Hamlet), starring Richard Burton
- Hamlet – (U.S.S.R.)
- Haqeeqat (Reality) – (India)
- A Hard Day's Night, directed by Richard Lester, starring the Beatles – (U.K.)
- Hey There, It's Yogi Bear!, a Hanna-Barbera feature production
- Hide and Seek, starring Ian Carmichael and Curd Jürgens – (U.K.)
- High Infidelity (Alta infedeltà), starring Nino Manfredi – (Italy)
- Honeymoon Hotel, starring Robert Morse and Robert Goulet
- The Horror of Party Beach, directed by Del Tenney
- Hot Enough for June, starring Dirk Bogarde and Sylva Koscina – (U.K.)
- A House Is Not a Home, starring Shelley Winters and Robert Taylor
- Hush... Hush, Sweet Charlotte, directed by Robert Aldrich, starring Bette Davis and Olivia de Havilland

=== I ===
- I Am Cuba (Soy Cuba), directed by Mikhail Kalatozov – (Cuba/U.S.S.R.)
- The Incredible Mr. Limpet, starring Don Knotts, Jack Weston and Andrew Duggan
- Intentions of Murder (Akai satsui), directed by Shōhei Imamura – (Japan)
- Invitation to a Gunfighter, starring Yul Brynner, George Segal, Janice Rule
- It's Not Just You, Murray!, a short film directed by Martin Scorsese
- Italiani brava gente, directed by Giuseppe De Santis – (Italy)

=== J ===
- Joseph Kilian (Postava k podpírání), directed by Pavel Juráček and Jan Schmidt – (Czechoslovakia)
- Joy House (Les felins), directed by René Clément, starring Alain Delon and Jane Fonda – (France)

=== K ===
- The Killers, directed by Don Siegel, starring Lee Marvin, Angie Dickinson, John Cassavetes and, in his final film, Ronald Reagan
- King & Country, directed by Joseph Losey, starring Dirk Bogarde and Tom Courtenay – (U.K.)
- Kiss Me Quick!, starring Althea Currier
- Kiss Me, Stupid, directed by Billy Wilder, starring Dean Martin and Kim Novak
- Kisses for My President, starring Polly Bergen and Fred MacMurray
- Kissin' Cousins, starring Elvis Presley and Yvonne Craig
- Kitten with a Whip, starring Ann-Margret and John Forsythe
- Kwaidan, directed by Masaki Kobayashi – (Japan)

=== L ===
- Lady General Hua Mu-lan (a.k.a. Hua Mu Lan) – (Hong Kong)
- Lady in a Cage, directed by Walter Grauman, starring Olivia de Havilland and James Caan
- Lana, Queen of the Amazons (Lana - Königin der Amazonen), starring Catherine Schell – (West Germany/Brazil)
- The Last Gun (Jim il primo), directed by Sergio Bergonzelli – (Italy)
- The Last Man on Earth (L'ultimo uomo della terra), starring Vincent Price – (United States/Italy)
- The Last Steps (Les pas perdus), starring Michèle Morgan and Jean-Louis Trintignant – (France)
- Leader, starring Dilip Kumar and Vyjayanthimala – (India)
- The Leather Boys, directed by Sidney J. Furie, starring Rita Tushingham – (U.K.)
- Lemonade Joe (Limonádový Joe aneb Koňská opera), directed by Oldřich Lipský – (Czechoslovakia)
- Let's Talk About Women (Se permettete parliamo di donne), directed by Ettore Scola – (Italy)
- Lilith, directed by Robert Rossen, starring Warren Beatty and Jean Seberg
- The Lively Set, starring James Darren, Pamela Tiffin and Doug McClure
- London in the Raw, a documentary about London nightlife – (U.K.)
- The Lonely Wife (Charulata), directed by Satyajit Ray – (India)
- The Long Hair of Death (I lunghi capelli della morte), directed by Antonio Margheriti – (Italy)
- The Long Ships, starring Richard Widmark and Sidney Poitier – (U.K./Yugoslavia)
- Looking for Love, starring Connie Francis
- Lorna, directed by Russ Meyer
- Love in 4 Dimensions (Amore in 4 dimensioni), directed by Mino Guerrini – (Italy)
- Loving Couples (Älskande par), directed by Mai Zetterling – (Sweden)
- The Luck of Ginger Coffey, directed by Irvin Kershner, starring Robert Shaw

=== M ===
- Madu Tiga (Three Wives), starring P. Ramlee – (Malaysia)
- The Magnificent Cuckold (Il magnifico cornuto), directed by Antonio Pietrangeli – (Italy)
- Mail Order Bride, directed by Burt Kennedy, starring Buddy Ebsen and Lois Nettleton
- Male Companion (Un monsieur de compagnie), directed by Philippe de Broca – (France)
- Male Hunt (La chasse à l'homme), starring Jean-Paul Belmondo – (France/Italy)
- Man in the Middle, starring Robert Mitchum
- Man's Favorite Sport?, directed by Howard Hawks, starring Rock Hudson and Paula Prentiss
- Marnie, directed by Alfred Hitchcock, starring Tippi Hedren and Sean Connery
- Marriage Italian Style (Matrimonio all'italiana), directed by Vittorio De Sica, starring Sophia Loren and Marcello Mastroianni – (Italy)
- A Married Woman (Une femme mariée), directed by Jean-Luc Godard – (France)
- Mary Poppins, starring Julie Andrews and Dick Van Dyke
- The Masque of the Red Death, starring Vincent Price, Hazel Court and Jane Asher – (U.K.)
- McHale's Navy, based on the television sitcom of the same name, starring Ernest Borgnine
- Men and Women (Noite Vazia), directed by Walter Hugo Khouri – (Brazil)
- The Misadventures of Merlin Jones, starring Annette Funicello and Tommy Kirk
- The Moon-Spinners, starring Hayley Mills
- Mothra vs. Godzilla (Godzilla vs. The Thing), directed by Ishirō Honda – (Japan)
- Murder Ahoy!, starring Margaret Rutherford and Lionel Jeffries
- Murder Most Foul, starring Margaret Rutherford and Ron Moody
- My Fair Lady, directed by George Cukor, starring Audrey Hepburn and Rex Harrison
- My Friend Lefterakis (O filos mou o Lefterakis) – (Greece)

=== N ===
- The Naked Kiss, directed by Samuel Fuller, starring Constance Towers
- The New Interns, starring Dean Jones and Michael Callan
- Night Must Fall, starring Albert Finney, Mona Washbourne and Susan Hampshire – (U.K.)
- The Night of the Iguana, directed by John Huston, starring Richard Burton, Ava Gardner, Deborah Kerr and Sue Lyon
- Night Train to Paris, starring Leslie Nielsen, Aliza Gur and Dorinda Stevens – (U.S./U.K.)
- The Night Walker, starring Barbara Stanwyck (her last film) and Robert Taylor
- Nightmare, directed by Freddie Francis – (U.K.)
- Nobody Waved Good-bye, directed by Don Owen – (Canada)
- Nothing But a Man, starring Ivan Dixon, Abbey Lincoln and Yaphet Kotto
- Nothing But the Best, starring Alan Bates and Millicent Martin – (U.K.)

=== O ===
- Of Human Bondage, starring Kim Novak, Laurence Harvey and Siobhán McKenna – (U.K.)
- One Potato, Two Potato, starring Barbara Barrie, Bernie Hamilton and Richard Mulligan
- Onibaba (Demon Woman), directed by Kaneto Shindo – (Japan)
- The Outrage, directed by Martin Ritt, starring Paul Newman, Laurence Harvey, Claire Bloom and Edward G. Robinson

=== P ===
- Pajama Party, starring Annette Funicello and Tommy Kirk
- Pale Flower (Kawaita hana) – (Japan)
- Panic Button, starring Jayne Mansfield and Maurice Chevalier
- Paris When It Sizzles, starring William Holden and Audrey Hepburn
- The Patsy, directed by and starring Jerry Lewis
- The Pawnbroker, directed by Sidney Lumet, starring Rod Steiger, Geraldine Fitzgerald and Brock Peters
- The Pleasure Seekers, starring Pamela Tiffin, Carol Lynley, Brian Keith, Tony Franciosa and Ann-Margret
- Point of Order!, a documentary directed by Emile de Antonio
- Psyche 59, directed by Alexander Singer – (U.K.)
- The Pumpkin Eater, starring Anne Bancroft and Peter Finch – (U.K.)

=== Q ===
- Quick, Before It Melts, starring George Maharis, Robert Morse, Anjanette Comer and Yvonne Craig
- The Quick Gun, starring Audie Murphy

=== R ===
- Raiders from Beneath the Sea, starring Ken Scott and Merry Anders
- Rattle of a Simple Man directed by Muriel Box, starring Diane Cilento and Harry H. Corbett – (U.K.)
- The Ravishing Idiot (Une ravissante idiote), starring Brigitte Bardot and Anthony Perkins – (France)
- Red Desert (Il deserto rosso), directed by Michelangelo Antonioni, starring Monica Vitti and Richard Harris – (Italy)
- Rhino!, starring Robert Culp
- Ride the Wild Surf, starring Tab Hunter, Fabian Forte, Shelley Fabares and Barbara Eden
- Ring of Spies, starring Bernard Lee – (U.K.)
- Rio Conchos, starring Stuart Whitman, Tony Franciosa, Richard Boone and Wende Wagner
- Robin and the 7 Hoods, starring Frank Sinatra, Dean Martin, Sammy Davis Jr. and Bing Crosby
- Robinson Crusoe on Mars, directed by Byron Haskin, starring Paul Mantee, Vic Lundin and Adam West
- Room 13 (Zimmer 13), directed by Harald Reinl – (Denmark/France/West Germany)
- Roustabout, starring Elvis Presley and Barbara Stanwyck
- Rudolph the Red-Nosed Reindeer – TV film by Rankin/Bass Productions

=== S ===
- Sallah Shabati, starring Chaim Topol – (Israel)
- Sangam, starring Vyjayanthimala, Raj Kapoor and Rajendra Kumar – (India)
- Santa Claus Conquers the Martians, directed by Nicholas Webster
- Séance on a Wet Afternoon, starring Kim Stanley and Richard Attenborough – (U.K.)
- The Secret Invasion, starring Stewart Granger and Mickey Rooney
- Seduced and Abandoned (Sedotta e abbandonata), starring Stefania Sandrelli – (Italy)
- Send Me No Flowers, starring Doris Day and Rock Hudson
- Seven Days in May, directed by John Frankenheimer, starring Kirk Douglas, Burt Lancaster, Fredric March and Ava Gardner
- Seven Up!, a documentary directed by Paul Almond – (U.K.)
- Sex and the Single Girl, starring Natalie Wood, Tony Curtis, Henry Fonda and Lauren Bacall
- Shehar Aur Sapna (The City and the Dream), directed by Khwaja Ahmad Abbas – (India)
- A Shot in the Dark, second Pink Panther film, directed by Blake Edwards. starring Peter Sellers and Elke Sommer – (U.K./U.S.)
- Sleep, by Andy Warhol
- Smokescreen, starring Yvonne Romain
- The Soft Skin (La peau douce), directed by François Truffaut, starring Françoise Dorléac – (France)
- Strait-Jacket, directed by William Castle, starring Joan Crawford and Diane Baker
- Swedish Wedding Night (Bröllopsbesvär), directed by Åke Falck – (Sweden)
- The System, starring Oliver Reed

=== T ===
- T.A.M.I. Show, a concert film filmed at the Santa Monica Civic Auditorium
- That Man from Rio (L'Homme de Rio), starring Jean-Paul Belmondo and Françoise Dorléac – (France)
- The Thin Red Line, starring Keir Dullea and Jack Warden
- This Is My Street, directed by Sidney Hayers – (U.K.)
- The Three Lives of Thomasina, starring Patrick McGoohan and Susan Hampshire – (UK/US)
- The Third Secret, starring Stephen Boyd and Pamela Franklin – (U.K.)
- Those Calloways, produced by Walt Disney and directed by Norman Tokar
- Three Outlaw Samurai (Sanbiki no samurai) – (Japan)
- La Tía Tula (Aunt Tula) – (Spain)
- A Tiger Walks, starring Brian Keith and Vera Miles
- Time of Indifference (Gli indifferenti), starring Claudia Cardinale, Rod Steiger and Shelley Winters – (Italy)
- The Time Travelers, starring Preston Foster and Merry Anders
- Tintin and the Blue Oranges (Tintin et les oranges bleues), starring Jean-Pierre Talbot – (France)
- To the Moon and Beyond, a film created for the 1964 New York World's Fair
- The Tomb of Ligeia, directed by Roger Corman, starring Vincent Price and Elizabeth Shepherd
- Topkapi, starring Melina Mercouri, Maximilian Schell and Peter Ustinov
- The Train, directed by John Frankenheimer, starring Burt Lancaster, Paul Scofield and Jeanne Moreau – (U.S./France/Italy)
- The Troops of Saint-Tropez (Le gendarme de Saint-Tropez), directed by Jean Girault – (France)
- Troubled Waters, (a.k.a. Man with Two Faces), starring Tab Hunter – (U.K.)
- Two Stage Sisters (Wŭtái Jiěmèi), directed by Xie Jin – (China)
- Two Thousand Maniacs!, directed by Herschell Gordon Lewis

=== U ===
- The Umbrellas of Cherbourg (Les parapluies de Cherbourg), directed by Jacques Demy, starring Catherine Deneuve and Nino Castelnuovo – (France)
- The Unsinkable Molly Brown, starring Debbie Reynolds, Harve Presnell and Ed Begley
- The Unvanquished (L'insoumis), starring Alain Delon – (France)

=== V ===
- The Visit, directed by Bernhard Wicki – (West Germany/U.S./France/Italy)
- Viva Las Vegas, starring Elvis Presley and Ann-Margret

=== W ===
- Weekend at Dunkirk (Week-end à Zuydcoote), directed by Henri Verneuil – (Italy/France)
- Welcome, or No Trespassing (Dobro pozhalovat, ili Postoronnim vkhod vospreshchyon), starring Yevgeniy Yevstigneyev – (U.S.S.R.)
- What a Way to Go!, starring Shirley MacLaine, Paul Newman, Robert Mitchum, Dean Martin, Gene Kelly, Bob Cummings and Dick Van Dyke
- Where Love Has Gone, starring Bette Davis and Susan Hayward
- Whirlwind (Shikonmado – Dai tatsumaki), directed by Hiroshi Inagaki – (Japan)
- White Voices (Le voci bianche), directed by Pasquale Festa Campanile and Massimo Franciosa – (Italy)
- Wild and Wonderful, starring Tony Curtis and Christine Kaufmann
- Wild West Story starring Carl-Gustaf Lindstedt, Lena Granhagen and Gerald Mohr
- Witchcraft, starring Lon Chaney and Jack Hedley – (U.K.)
- Woh Kaun Thi? (Who Was She?) – (India)
- Woman in the Dunes (Suna no onna), directed by Hiroshi Teshigahara – (Japan)
- Woman of Straw, starring Gina Lollobrigida and Sean Connery – (U.K.)
- World Without Sun (Le monde sans soleil), directed by Jacques-Yves Cousteau – (France)
- The World's Most Beautiful Swindlers (Les plus belles escroqueries du monde), composed of five segments – (France)
- Wonderful Life (U.S. title: Swingers' Paradise), starring Cliff Richard and the Shadows – (U.K.)
- The World of Henry Orient, directed by George Roy Hill, starring Peter Sellers, Paula Prentiss and Angela Lansbury

=== Y ===
- Yearning (Midareru), directed by Mikio Naruse – (Japan)
- The Yellow Rolls-Royce, starring Rex Harrison and Jeanne Moreau – (U.K.)
- The Young Lovers, starring Peter Fonda and Sharon Hugueny
- Youngblood Hawke, starring James Franciscus, Suzanne Pleshette and Geneviève Page
- Your Cheatin' Heart, a biopic of Hank Williams, starring George Hamilton

=== Z ===
- Zatoichi and the Chest of Gold (Zatōichi senryō-kubi), directed by Kazuo Ikehiro – (Japan)
- Zatoichi's Flashing Sword (Zatōichi abare dako), directed by Kazuo Ikehiro – (Japan)
- Zhavoronok (Жаворонок), starring Gennadi Yukhtin – (U.S.S.R.)
- Zindagi, starring Vyjayanthimala, Rajendra Kumar, Raaj Kumar and Prithviraj Kapoor – (India)
- Zogue fe Agaza, starring Salah Zulfikar and Laila Taher – (Egypt)
- Zorba the Greek, directed by Michael Cacoyannis, starring Anthony Quinn and Alan Bates – (Greece/U.K.)
- Zulu, directed by Cy Endfield, starring Stanley Baker, Michael Caine and Jack Hawkins – (U.K.)

== Short film series ==
- Looney Tunes (1930–1969)
- Terrytoons (1930–1964)
- Merrie Melodies (1931–1969)
- Speedy Gonzales (1953–1968)
- Bugs Bunny (1940–1964)
- Woody Woodpecker (1940–1972)
- Chilly Willy (1953–1972)
- Loopy De Loop (1959–1965)

== Births ==
- January 1
  - Crystal R. Fox, American actress and singer
  - Dedee Pfeiffer, American actress
- January 4
  - David Bowe, American character actor
  - Hristo Shopov, Bulgarian actor
- January 6
  - Lorne Cardinal, Canadian actor
  - Cara Seymour, British actress
- January 7 – Nicolas Cage, American actor, producer and director
- January 9 - Luca Lionello, Italian actor
- January 11 – Patrícia Pillar, Brazilian actress
- January 13 – Penelope Ann Miller, American actress
- January 14 - Mark Addy, English actor
- January 15 – Craig Fairbrass, English actor, producer, and screenwriter
- January 18
  - Jane Horrocks, English actress
  - Enrico Lo Verso, Italian actor
  - Michael Roberds, Canadian actor (d. 2016)
- January 19 - Ty Granderson Jones, Creole American actor, screenwriter and producer
- January 20 - Francesca Buller, English actress
- January 21 - Eric Matheny, American actor and screenwriter
- January 23 - Mariska Hargitay, American actress
- January 26 - Paul Johansson, American actor and director
- January 27 – Bridget Fonda, American actress
- February 1 - Linus Roache, British actor
- February 5 – Laura Linney, American actress
- February 10 - Francesca Neri, Italian actress
- February 14 - Valente Rodriguez, American actor
- February 15 – Chris Farley, American actor (d. 1997)
- February 16 – Christopher Eccleston, English actor
- February 17 - Angelica Page, American actress, director, producer and screenwriter
- February 18 – Matt Dillon, American actor
- February 20
  - Willie Garson, American actor (d. 2021)
  - Rodney Rowland, American actor
  - French Stewart, American actor
- February 21 - Adrian Schiller, English actor (d. 2024)
- February 22 - James Wlcek, American actor
- February 23 - Ronan Vibert, English actor (d. 2022)
- February 24 – Todd Field, American director and actor
- February 25 - Lee Evans, English stand-up comedian and actor
- February 26 - Mark Dacascos, American actor and martial artist
- February 27 - John Pyper-Ferguson, Canadian actor
- March 1 - Sean Gilder, English actor
- March 3 - Laura Harring, Mexican-American actress
- March 6 - Yvette Wilson, American actress and comedian (d. 2012)
- March 7
  - Ellen McElduff, Canadian actress
  - Wanda Sykes, American actress, comedian and writer
- March 8
  - Bob Bergen, American voice actor
  - Chris Browning, American actor
- March 9
  - Juliette Binoche, French actress
  - Valérie Lemercier, French actress, screenwriter and director
- March 11
  - Peter Berg, American director, producer, writer and actor
  - Emma Chambers, English actress (d. 2018)
  - Shane Richie, English actor, comedian, television presenter and singer
- March 16 - Gore Verbinski, American director, screenwriter, producer and musician
- March 17 – Rob Lowe, American actor
- March 23
  - Hope Davis, American actress
  - Chris Henchy, American director, producer and screenwriter
- March 25 - LisaGay Hamilton, American actress
- March 27 - Clive Rowe, British actor
- March 29 - Elle Macpherson, Australian actress and model
- March 30 - Ian Ziering, American actor
- April 2 - Jana Marie Hupp, American actress
- April 4 – David Cross, American actor and comedian
- April 6 - Deborah Theaker, Canadian actress
- April 7 – Russell Crowe, New Zealand actor
- April 8 - Biz Markie, American rapper and actor (d. 2021)
- April 9 - Daniel Escobar, American actor (d. 2013)
- April 12 - Mark Camacho, Canadian actor and voice actor
- April 13 - Caroline Rhea, Canadian-American actress, voice artist and stand-up comedian
- April 14
  - Bob Clendenin, American actor
  - Gina McKee, English actress
- April 16
  - Boyd Banks, Canadian stand-up comedian and actor
  - Yorick van Wageningen, Dutch actor
- April 17 - Lela Rochon, American actress
- April 20
  - Crispin Glover, American actor
  - Andy Serkis, English actor
- April 22 - Chris Makepeace, Canadian former actor
- April 24
  - Djimon Hounsou, American actor
  - Cedric the Entertainer, American actor and comedian
  - Gregory Sporleder, American actor and filmmaker
- April 25 – Hank Azaria, American actor, voice actor, comedian and producer
- May 1 - Scott Coffey, American actor, director, producer and screenwriter
- May 5 - Don Payne, American writer and producer (d. 2013)
- May 6
  - Dana Hill, American actress (d. 1996)
  - Lars Mikkelsen, Danish actor
- May 9 - Sonja Sohn, American actress and filmmaker
- May 10 - Sam Pancake, American actor, writer and comedian
- May 11 - Tim Blake Nelson, American actor, writer and director
- May 12
  - Tiffany Helm, American actress
  - Pierre Morel, French film director
- May 13
  - Stephen Colbert, American comedian, television host, and writer
  - Sakichi Sato, Japanese actor, director and screenwriter
  - Tom Verica, American actor, director and producer
- May 16 - Rebecca Front, English actress, writer and comedian
- May 19 - Sean Whalen, American actor and writer
- May 20 - Paolo Seganti, Italian actor
- May 22 - Mark Christopher Lawrence, American character actor, stand-up comedian and voice-over artist
- May 25 – Ray Stevenson, Irish actor (d. 2023)
- May 26 - Lenny Kravitz, American singer, songwriter and actor
- May 27 - Adam Carolla, American radio personality, comedian, actor and podcaster
- May 28 - Christa Miller, American actress
- June 3 - James Purefoy, English actor
- June 7
  - Judie Aronson, American actress
  - Gia Carides, Australian actress
- June 9 – Gloria Reuben, Canadian-American actress, producer, and singer
- June 10
  - Tony Martin, New Zealand comedian, writer and actor
  - Vincent Perez, Swiss actor, director and photographer
- June 12 - Paula Marshall, American actress
- June 13
  - Kathy Burke, English actress, comedian, writer, producer, and director
  - Laura Kightlinger, American actress, comedian and writer
- June 15 – Courteney Cox, American actress
- June 16 - Danny Burstein, American actor and singer
- June 21 – David Morrissey, English actor and filmmaker
- June 22
  - Hiroshi Abe, Japanese actor and model
  - Amy Brenneman, American actress and producer
  - Paterson Joseph, British actor
- June 23
  - Tara Morice, Australian actress and singer
  - Joss Whedon, American filmmaker and composer
- June 26 - Ian Tracey, Canadian actor
- June 27
  - Michael Reilly Burke, American actor
  - Terry Serpico, American actor
- June 29 - Kathleen Wilhoite, American actress and musician
- June 30
  - Ivan Trojan, Czech actor
  - Mark Waters, American screenwriter, director and producer
- July 1 - Peter Marquardt, American actor and video game producer (d. 2014)
- July 2 - Eric Michels, American actor (d. 2018)
- July 3
  - Peyton Reed, American director
  - Aleksei Serebryakov, Russian actor
  - Yeardley Smith, American actress, voice actress, writer, author, comedian and painter
- July 5 - Jillian Armenante, American actress
- July 7 - Tracy Reiner, American actress
- July 8 – Lam Suet, Hong Kong actor
- July 9 – Courtney Love, American singer, guitarist, songwriter, and actress
- July 11
  - Laura Cayouette, American actress, writer, producer and director
  - Greg Mottola, American director and screenwriter
- July 15
  - Galyn Görg, American actress (d. 2020)
  - Shari Headley, American actress
- July 16 – Canti Lau, Hong Kong actor
- July 17 - Heather Langenkamp, American actress, writer, director and producer
- July 19 - Peter Dobson, American actor
- July 20 - Dean Winters, American actor
- July 22
  - Adam Godley, English actor
  - David Spade, American actor, comedian, writer
- July 26
  - Sandra Bullock, American actress
  - Danny Woodburn, American actor and comedian
- July 28 — Lori Loughlin, American actress
- July 30
  - Vivica A. Fox, American actress
  - Jim Wise, American actor, singer, writer and composer
- August 1 - Melanie Shatner, American actress
- August 2 – Mary-Louise Parker, American actress
- August 4 - Sebastian Roché, French-American actor
- August 6 - Lisa Boyle, American actress and model
- August 7 - Tom McGrath, American voice actor, animator, screenwriter and director
- August 11 - Lawrence Monoson, American retired actor
- August 13 - Debi Mazar, American actress and television personality
- August 14 - Andrew Kevin Walker, American screenwriter and actor
- August 15 - Michael Berresse, American actor and director
- August 16 – William Salyers, American actor and voice actor
- August 18
  - Craig Bierko, American actor
  - Brian Stack, American actor, comedian and writer
- August 20 – Flaminia Cinque, English actress
- August 24 - Dana Gould, American stand-up comedian, actor and writer
- August 25
  - Saverio Guerra, American actor
  - Blair Underwood, American actor
- August 27 - Robert Bogue, American actor
- August 29
  - Dina Spybey, American actress
  - Stacey Travis, American actress
- August 30 - Nelson Ascencio, Cuban-American actor and comedian
- August 31 - Mark Lewis Jones, Welsh actor
- September 1 - Welker White, American actress
- September 2 – Keanu Reeves, Canadian actor
- September 5
  - Thomas Mikal Ford, American actor and comedian (d. 2016)
  - Amanda Ooms, Dutch-Swedish actress and writer
- September 6 - Rosie Perez, American actress
- September 8 - Mitchell Whitfield, American actor
- September 10
  - Raymond Cruz, American actor
  - Don Stephenson, American actor
- September 11 - Gary Lydon, British-Irish actor (d. 2026)
- September 14
  - Stephen Dunham, American actor (d. 2012)
  - Faith Ford, American actress
- September 16 - Molly Shannon, American actress and comedian
- September 19 - Jennifer Cooke, American former actress
- September 20 - Maggie Cheung, Hong Kong actress
- September 24 - Adam Alexi-Malle, Italian actor and singer
- September 28 - Janeane Garofalo, American actress, voice artist, stand-up comedian and writer
- September 30 - Monica Bellucci, Italian actress and model
- October 3 – Clive Owen, English actor
- October 6 - Dimiter Marinov, Bulgarian-American actor
- October 8 - Ian Hart, English actor
- October 9 - Guillermo del Toro, Mexican filmmaker
- October 10
  - Antonio Albanese, Italian comedian, actor, director and writer
  - Quinton Flynn, American film, television and voice actor
  - Tim Miller, American filmmaker
- October 12 - Allen Covert, American comedian, actor, writer and producer
- October 13 – Matt Walsh, American comedian and actor
- October 14
  - Adam Hollander, American actor (d. 1984)
  - David Kaye, Canadian-American voice actor
- October 15 - Richard Dillane, English actor
- October 22 – Bill Camp, American actor
- October 23 - David Sobolov, Canadian voice actor and director
- October 25 – Kevin Michael Richardson, American actor and voice actor
- October 30 - Mark Steven Johnson, American filmmaker
- October 31 - Kirk Jones, English director and screenwriter
- November 2
  - Lauren Vélez, American actress
  - Lorraine Vélez, American singer and actress
- November 5 - Famke Janssen, Dutch actress
- November 6 - Arkie Whiteley, Australian actress (d. 2001)
- November 7
  - Troy Byer, American director, screenwriter and actress
  - Garret T. Sato, American actor (d. 2020)
- November 11
  - Calista Flockhart, American actress
  - Angus Wright, American-born British actor
- November 14 – Patrick Warburton, American actor and voice artist
- November 16
  - Valeria Bruni Tedeschi, Italian-French actress, screenwriter and director
  - Harry Lennix, American actor
- November 17 - Ralph Garman, American actor, comedian, musician and radio host
- November 18 - Nadia Sawalha, British actress, television personality and YouTuber
- November 20 - Ned Vaughn, American actor
- November 21 - Liza Tarbuck, English actress, comedian and presenter
- November 23 - Boyd Kestner, American actor
- November 24
  - Garret Dillahunt, American actor
  - Conleth Hill, Irish actor
- November 27 - Adam Shankman, American director, producer, writer, actor and choreographer
- November 29 – Don Cheadle, American actor
- November 30 - Richard Brake, Welsh-born American character actor
- December 3 - Lisanne Falk, American former actress and producer
- December 4 – Marisa Tomei, American actress
- December 8
  - Teri Hatcher, American actress
  - John Refoua, American film editor (d. 2023)
- December 10 - Edith González, Mexican actress and dancer (d. 2019)
- December 15 - Paul Kaye, English comedian and actor
- December 16 - Paul C. Vogt, American actor and comedian
- December 18 - Stone Cold Steve Austin, American retired professional wrestler and actor
- December 19
  - Zhang Hanyu, Chinese actor
  - Ben Becker, German actor
- December 21 – Jack Noseworthy, American actor
- December 23
  - Shelley Malil, American actor
  - Reg Rogers, American actor
- December 24
  - Fabiana Udenio, Italian-Argentine actress
  - Mark Valley, American actor
- December 27
  - Ian Gomez, American actor
  - Theresa Randle, American actress
- December 29 - Michael Cudlitz, American actor
- December 30
  - George Newbern, American actor
  - Sophie Ward, British actress
- December 31 - Michael McDonald, American stand-up comedian, actor, screenwriter and director

== Deaths ==
- January 21 - Joseph Schildkraut, 67, Austrian actor, The Diary of Anne Frank, The Life of Emile Zola, Viva Villa!
- January 22 – Lissy Arna, 63, German actress, Eva in Silk, The Dance Goes On
- January 27 – Norman Z. McLeod, 65, American director, The Paleface, The Secret Life of Walter Mitty
- January 29 – Alan Ladd, 50, American actor, Shane, The Blue Dahlia
- February 19 – Edward Gargan, 62, American actor, Little Miss Broadway, Adventures of Gallant Bess
- February 24 – Frank Conroy, 73, British actor, The Ox-Bow Incident, The Naked City
- February 27 – Orry-Kelly, 66, Australian costume designer, Casablanca, The Maltese Falcon
- February 29 – Frank Albertson, 55, American actor, It's a Wonderful Life, Psycho
- March 1 – Dennis Moore, 56, American actor, The Lone Rider and the Bandit, Overland Stagecoach
- March 4 – Edwin August, 80, American actor, director and screenwriter
- March 10 – Arthur Hohl, 74, American actor, Cleopatra, Private Detective 62
- March 23 – Peter Lorre, 59, Hungarian actor, Casablanca, The Maltese Falcon
- March 24 – Kitty McShane, 66, Irish actress, Old Mother Riley
- April 18 – Ben Hecht, 70, American playwright and screenwriter, Notorious, His Girl Friday
- April 29 – J. M. Kerrigan, 79, Irish actor (Gone with the Wind)
- May 10 – Carol Haney, 39, American dancer, actress, The Pajama Game, Invitation to the Dance
- May 13 – Diana Wynyard, 58, British actress, Cavalcade, Gaslight
- June 20 - Edgar Barrier, 57, American actor, Phantom on the Opera, Macbeth
- June 27 – Mona Barrie, 54, British actress, Mystery Woman, Ladies Love Danger
- July 15 – Myles Connolly, 66, American screenwriter, State of the Union, Hans Christian Andersen
- July 26 – William A. Seiter, 73, American film director, The Beautiful and Damned, Sons of the Desert, Roberta
- August 5 – Charles Quigley, 58, American actor, The Shadow, The Game That Kills
- August 6
  - Cedric Hardwicke, 71, British actor, Rope, Suspicion
  - Reed Howes, 64, American model and actor, The Dawn Rider, Paradise Canyon
- August 12 – Ian Fleming, 56, British author of James Bond novels, Chitty Chitty Bang Bang
- August 27 – Gracie Allen, 69, American comedy actress, A Damsel in Distress, The Big Broadcast of 1936
- September 23 – Fred M. Wilcox, 56, American director, Forbidden Planet, Lassie Come Home
- September 28
  - Harpo Marx, 75, American comedy actor (The Marx Brothers), Duck Soup, A Night at the Opera
  - Nacio Herb Brown, 68, American songwriter and composer, The Broadway Melody, Glorifying the American Girl
- October 10 – Eddie Cantor, 72, American actor, singer, comedian, Whoopee!, Kid Millions
- October 15 – Cole Porter, 73, American composer and songwriter, Night and Day, High Society
- October 19 – Russ Brown, 72, American actor, Damn Yankees, Anatomy of a Murder
- October 22 – Whip Wilson, 53, American actor, Night Raiders
- October 23 – Jo Swerling, 71, American screenwriter, It's a Wonderful Life, Guys and Dolls
- October 27 – Rudolph Maté, 66, Hungarian cinematographer and director, D.O.A., When Worlds Collide
- November 10 – Sam Newfield, 64, American director, The Terror of Tiny Town, I Accuse My Parents
- November 22 – George Tomasini, 55, American film editor, Psycho, Rear Window
- December 11 – Percy Kilbride, 76, American actor, The Southerner, State Fair
- December 14 – William Bendix, 58, American actor, Lifeboat, Detective Story
- December 31 – Gertrude Michael, 53, American actress, Murder at the Vanities, Women in Bondage

== Film debuts ==
- Jenny Agutter – East of Sudan
- Elizabeth Ashley – The Carpetbaggers
- René Auberjonois – Lilith
- Erika Blanc – Il disco volante
- Stanley Brock – Black Like Me
- Jim Brown – Rio Conchos
- Ellen Burstyn – For Those Who Think Young
- David Carradine – Taggart
- Jean-Pierre Castaldi – Angélique, Marquise des Anges
- Cheng Pei-pei – The Last Woman of Shang
- Matt Clark – Black Like Me
- Tim Conway – McHale's Navy
- Pia Zadora – Santa Claus Conquers the Martians
- Kitty Courbois – Spuit Elf
- Maria Cumani Quasimodo – Shivers in Summer
- Dom DeLuise – Diary of a Bachelor
- Judi Dench – The Third Secret
- Paul Dooley – The Parisienne and the Prudes
- Olympia Dukakis – Lilith
- Sanjay Dutt – Yaadein
- Morgan Freeman – The Pawnbroker
- Brenda Fricker – Of Human Bondage
- George Furth – The Best Man
- Elliott Gould – Quick, Let's Get Married
- Clu Gulager – The Killers
- Moses Gunn – Nothing But a Man
- Julius Harris – Nothing But a Man
- James Earl Jones – Dr. Strangelove
- Lee Majors – Strait-Jacket
- Margaret Nolan – Saturday Night Out
- Charlotte Rampling – A Hard Day's Night
- Roy Scheider – The Curse of the Living Corpse
- Raquel Welch – A House Is Not a Home
