= List of Japanese films of 1964 =

A list of films released in Japan in 1964 (see 1964 in film).

== List of films ==
Japanese films released in 1964
Title	Japanese Title	Release date	Director	Cast	Genre	Notes
	KISS KISS KISS	1964.__.__	Tadanori Yokoo			
	アンソロジー No. 1	1964.__.__	Tadanori Yokoo			
	殺人 MURDER	1964.__.__	Makoto Wada			
	潜水艦カシオペア	1964.__.__	Hiroshi Manabe			
	恐るべき遺産	1964.__.__	Kōji Wakamatsu			
	私はベレット	1964.__.__	Nagisa Ōshima			
	シェルタープラン	1964.__.__	Motoharu Jōnouchi			
	裸の形	1964.__.__	Kōji Wakamatsu			
	狂ったうめき	1964.__.__	Kōe Shindō			
	黒い血のうずき	1964.__.__	Mamoru Makino			
	カメラは見た 痴情	1964.__.__	Tatsuo Asano			
	モンローのような女	1964.01.01	Minoru Shibuya			
Miyamoto Musashi IV: Duel at Ichijoji Temple	宮本武蔵 一乗寺の決斗	1964.01.01	Tomu Uchida		Jidai-geki	
	続・拝啓天皇陛下様	1964.01.01	Yoshitarō Nomura			
Tokyo Gang vs Hong Kong Gang	東京ギャング対香港ギャング	1964.01.01	Teruo Ishii		Yakuza	
	赤いハンカチ	1964.01.03	Toshio Masuda		Yakuza	
Hail the 3 Gents	社長紳士録	1964.01.03	Shue Matsubayashi	Hisaya Morishige, Keiju Kobayashi, Yoko Tsukasa	Comedy	
	温泉女医	1964.01.09	Keigo Kimura			
Vanquished Foes	人斬り笠	1964.01.09	Sadatsugu Matsuda		Jidai-geki	
	地獄命令	1964.01.09	Shigehiro Ozawa		Yakuza	
Sleepy Eyes of Death: Sword of Adventure	眠狂四郎勝負	1964.01.09	Kenji Misumi		Jidai-geki	
Whirlwind	士魂魔道 大竜巻	1964.01.13	Hiroshi Inagaki	Somegoro Ichikawa, Yosuke Natsuki, Makoto Sato	Jidai-geki / Ninja	
	図々しい奴	1964.01.15	Masaharu Segawa			
	成熟する季節	1964.01.15	Buichi Saitō			
	東海遊侠伝	1964.01.15	Motomu Ida		Yakuza	
The Samurai From Nowhere	道場破り	1964.01.15	Seiichirō Uchikawa		Jidai-geki	
	馬鹿まるだし	1964.01.15	Yōji Yamada			
Warrior of the Wind	風の武士	1964.01.15	Tai Katō		Jidai-geki / Ninja	
Yearning	乱れる	1964.01.15	Mikio Naruse	Hideko Takamine, Yūzō Kayama, Mitsuko Kusabue	Drama	
It Happened on Station Street	喜劇 駅前女将	1964.01.15	Kozo Saeki	Hisaya Morishige, Junzaburo Ban, Frankie Sakai		
	現代インチキ物語 騙し屋	1964.01.19	Yasuzō Masumura			
Dokonjō monogatari: Zuputo iyatsu	ど根性物語 図太い奴	1964.01.19	Kazuo Mori			
	39年大相撲初場所 前半戦	1964.01.25	Torahiko Ise [composition]			
	こんにちは、20歳	1964.01.25	Kenjirō Morinaga			
	駆け出し刑事	1964.01.25	Masuo Maeda			
Ninja Lord	忍び大名	1964.01.25	Yasushi Sasaki		Jidai-geki / Ninja	
	39年大相撲初場所 後半戦	1964.02.01	Torahiko Ise [composition]			
	現代金儲け物語	1964.02.01	Tatsuo Sakai			
	黒の爆走	1964.02.01	Sōkichi Tomimoto			
The Judo Generation: The Devil of Kodokan	柔道一代 講道館の鬼	1964.02.01	Kiyoshi Saeki			
Owarai Tonosama Dochu	大笑い殿さま道中	1964.02.01	Kōkichi Uchide		Jidai-geki	
Nihon-Mei Shobu Monogatari: Kodokan no Washi	日本名勝負物語 講道館の鷲	1964.02.01	Shunkai Mizuho			
	落第生とお嬢さん	1964.02.01	Kinya Sakai			
Cruel Gun Story	拳銃残酷物語	1964.02.01	Takumi Furukawa	Joe Shishido, Chieko Matsubara, Tamio Kawachi	Yakuza	
Kyofu no jikan	恐怖の時間	1964.02.01	Katsumi Iwauchi	Tsutomu Yamazaki, Yūzō Kayama, Yuriko Hoshi		
Otoko girai	男嫌い	1964.02.01	Ryo Kinoshita	Fubuki Koshiji, Keiko Awaji, Kyōko Kishida		
	激動の20世紀	1964.02.04				
	ジャコ万と鉄	1964.02.08	Kinji Fukasaku			
	美しい十代	1964.02.08	Ren Yoshimura			
The Kingdom of Jirocho Part 3	次郎長三国志 第三部	1964.02.08	Masahiro Makino		Jidai-geki	
The Flower and the Angry Waves	花と怒濤	1964.02.08	Seijun Suzuki	Akira Kobayashi, Chieko Matsubara, Osamu Takizawa	Yakuza	
Misutaa - Jyaiantsu-Shori no hata	ミスター・ジャイアンツ 勝利の旗	1964.02.12	Kozo Saeki	Shigeo Nagashima, Sadaharu Oh, Yomiuri Giants	Drama	
International Secret Police: Trap of Suicide Kilometer	国際秘密警察 虎の牙	1964.02.14	Jun Fukuda	Tatsuya Mihashi, Tadao Nakamaru, Susumu Kurobe	Crime	
	「女の小箱」より 夫が見た	1964.02.15	Yasuzō Masumura			
	殺られる前に殺れ	1964.02.15	Tarō Yuge			
Woman in the Dunes	砂の女	1964.02.15	Hiroshi Teshigahara	Eiji Okada, Kyōko Kishida, Hiroko Ito		
	駆逐艦雪風	1964.02.16	Tatsuo Yamada			
	寝言泥棒	1964.02.16	Manao Horiuchi			
	こんにちは赤ちゃん	1964.02.23	Motomu Ida			
	警視庁物語 自供	1964.02.23	Michio Konishi			
Three Ronin	三匹の浪人	1964.02.23	Tōru Hirayama		Jidai-geki	
Theater of Life	人生劇場	1964.02.23	Toshio Masuda		Yakuza	
	芸者学校	1964.02.29	Keigo Kimura			
	現代インチキ物語 ど狸	1964.02.29	Shigeo Tanaka			
3 Gents in the Snow Country	続社長紳士録	1964.02.29	Shue Matsubayashi	Hisaya Morishige, Keiju Kobayashi, Yoko Tsukasa	Comedy	
Tiger Flight	今日もわれ大空にあり	1964.02.29	Kengo Furusawa	Tatsuya Mihashi, Yosuke Natsuki, Makoto Sato	Action	
	女嫌い	1964.03.01	Hirokazu Ichimura			
Theater of Life: New Hishakaku Story	人生劇場 新・飛車角	1964.03.01	Tadashi Sawashima		Yakuza	
The Third Ninja	第三の忍者	1964.03.01	Toshikazu Kōno		Jidai-geki / Ninja	
	女・うらの裏	1964.03.__	Takeo Takagi			
	青春の情事	1964.03.__	Kōe Shindō			
	肉体の手形	1964.03.__	Satoru Kobayashi			
Pale Flower	乾いた花	1964.03.01	Masahiro Shinoda	Ryō Ikebe	Yakuza	
	月曜日のユカ	1964.03.04	Kō Nakahira			
	姿なき拳銃魔	1964.03.04	Isamu Kosugi			
Ukyonosuke's Reverse Ichimonji Cut	紫右京之介 逆一文字斬り	1964.03.12	Yasuto Hasegawa		Jidai-geki / Ninja	
	二匹の牝犬	1964.03.12	Yūsuke Watanabe			
Sword	剣	1964.03.14	Kenji Misumi			
	浅草の灯 踊子物語	1964.03.14	Buichi Saitō			
	仲間たち	1964.03.14	Nozomu Yanase			
Zatoichi and the Chest of Gold	座頭市千両首	1964.03.14	Kazuo Ikehiro	Shintaro Katsu, Shogo Shimada, Machiko Hasegawa	Jidai-geki / Chambara	
The Samurai From Somewhere	続・道場破り 問答無用	1964.03.15	Yasushi Kikuchi, Hiroki Matsuno		Jidai-geki	
	犯罪のメロディー	1964.03.15	Umetsugu Inoue			
	めす犬の賭け	1964.03.17	Kōji Wakamatsu			
The Joy of Being Young	続・若い季節	1964.03.20	Kengo Furusawa	Mie Nakao, Mari Sono, Yukari Ito	Musical comedy	
A Little Matchmaker	こんにちは赤ちゃん	1964.03.20	Shue Matsubayashi	Michiyo Azusa, Yasuo Tanabe, Keiju Kobayashi		
	狼少年ケン アラビアの怪人 魔の岩の決闘	1964.03.22	Sadao Tsukioka, Yūgo Serikawa			
	花嫁は十五才	1964.03.25	Mio Ezaki			
	無頼無法の徒 さぶ	1964.03.25	Takashi Nomura			
	狼少年ケン トーテンポールの魔人 ピストル騒動	1964.03.28	Hiroshi Ikeda, Kimio Yabuki			
The Spy Swordsman	隠密剣士	1964.03.28	Sadao Funadoko		Jidai-geki / Ninja	
Jūdō-mei Shōbu Monogatari: Hissatsu Ippon	柔道名勝負物語 必殺一本	1964.03.28	Masateru Nishiyama			
Children Hand in Hand	手をつなぐ子ら	1964.03.28	Susumu Hani		Documentary	
	青い目の嫁はん	1964.03.29	Yoshirō Kawazu			
	二十一歳の父	1964.03.29	Noboru Nakamura			
	女の秘境	1964.03.31	Hiroshi Takagi			
	0歳の女	1964.04.__	Kiyoshi Komori			
	黒の挑戦者	1964.04.04	Mitsuo Murayama			
	出撃	1964.04.04	Eisuke Takizawa			
	傷だらけの山河	1964.04.04	Satsuo Yamamoto			
	抜き射ちの竜 拳銃の歌	1964.04.04	Haruyasu Noguchi			
Kigeki Yoki na mibojin	喜劇 陽気な未亡人	1964.04.04	Shiro Toyoda	Frankie Sakai, Kyu Sakamoto, Michiyo Aratama		
Kutabare! Shaiyozoku	くたばれ！社用族	1964.04.04	Kozaburo Hatta	Makoto Fujita, Hideo Sunazuka, Shincho Kokontei		
An Outlaw	ならず者	1964.04.05	Teruo Ishii			
	車夫遊侠伝 喧嘩辰	1964.04.05	Tai Katō		Yakuza	
	ケチまるだし	1964.04.12	Mitsuo Fuwa			
	噂の風来坊	1964.04.12	Haruyasu Noguchi			
	花の舞妓はん	1964.04.12	Hirokazu Ichimura			
	帝銀事件 死刑囚	1964.04.12	Kei Kumai			
	夜の誘惑	1964.04.14	Yūji Ōno			
	アスファルト・ガール	1964.04.18	Kōji Shima			
	どろ犬	1964.04.18	Takaharu Saeki			
	江戸犯罪帳 黒い爪	1964.04.18	Kōsaku Yamashita		Jidai-geki	
Kino Kieta Otoko	昨日消えた男	1964.04.18	Kazuo Mori		Jidai-geki	
Aa baku dan	ああ爆弾	1964.04.18	Kihachi Okamoto	Yūnosuke Itō, Ichiro Nakaya, Ikio Sawamura	Thriller	
	黒い太陽	1964.04.19	Koreyoshi Kurahara			
	猟人日記	1964.04.19	Kō Nakahira			
Main Street in the Under World	暗黒街大通り	1964.04.25	Umetsugu Inoue		Yakuza	
	東京アンタッチャブル 売春地下組織	1964.04.25	Masuichi Iizuka			
	いいかげん馬鹿	1964.04.29	Yōji Yamada			
	潮騒	1964.04.29	Kenjirō Morinaga			
	拝啓総理大臣様	1964.04.29	Yoshitarō Nomura			
	夕陽の丘	1964.04.29	Akinori Matsuo			
Mothra vs. Godzilla	モスラ対ゴジラ	1964.04.29	Ishirō Honda	Akira Takarada, Yuriko Hoshi, The Peanuts		
Operation Lion Ant	蟻地獄作戦	1964.04.29	Takashi Tsuboshima	Tatsuya Nakadai, Makoto Sato, Tadao Nakamaru		
	狼少年ケン おばけ嫌い ジャングル最大の作戦	1964.05.01	Yoshio Kuroda, Isao Takahata			
	妾	1964.05.01	Kinya Ogawa			
	結婚生活入門	1964.05.__				
	濡れた手	1964.05.__	Akira Miwa			
	ど根性物語 銭の踊り	1964.05.02	Kon Ichikawa			
	宿無し犬	1964.05.02	Tokuzō Tanaka			
Echigo tsutsuishi oyashirazu	越後つついし親不知	1964.05.09	Tadashi Imai	Rentarō Mikuni, Yoshiko Sakuma	Crime drama	
	嘘は底抜け	1964.05.13	Manao Horiuchi			
	河内ぞろ どけち虫	1964.05.13	Toshio Masuda			
	若い港	1964.05.13	Nozomu Yanase			
Three Outlaw Samurai	三匹の侍	1964.05.13	Hideo Gosha	Tetsuro Tamba, Isamu Nagato, Mikijirō Hira	Jidai-geki	
	この道赤信号	1964.05.16	Toshirō Ōmi			
Boku wa bodigaado	僕はボディガード	1964.05.16	Seiji Hisamatsu	Kiyoshi Atsumi, Mie Hama, Ichiro Arishima		
Marriage if for the Doll	ひばり・チエミ・いづみ 三人よれば	1964.05.16	Toshio Sugie	Hibari Misora, Chiemi Eri, Izumi Yukimura	Musical	
	怪談残酷幽霊	1964.05.17	Satoru Kobayashi			
	赤い犯行	1964.05.17	Kōji Wakamatsu			
	君たちがいて僕がいた	1964.05.23	Ryūichi Takamori			
	獣の戯れ	1964.05.23	Sōkichi Tomimoto			
Shingo's Final Duel	新吾番外勝負	1964.05.23	Sadatsugu Matsuda		Jidai-geki	
	生きている狼	1964.05.23	Motomu Ida			
Sleepy Eyes of Death: Full Circle Killing	眠狂四郎円月斬り	1964.05.23	Kimiyoshi Yasuda		Jidai-geki	
	39年大相撲夏場所 前半戦	1964.05.24	Torahiko Ise [composition]			
	香華 前後篇	1964.05.24	Keisuke Kinoshita			
	青い乳房の埋葬	1964.05.26	Kiyoshi Komori			
Tadaima shinsatsu chu	ただいま診察中	1964.05.30	Nobuo Aoyagi	Keiju Kobayashi, Yoko Tsukasa, Takashi Shimura		
You Can Succeed, Too	君も出世ができる	1964.05.30	Eizo Sugawa	Frankie Sakai, Tadao Takashima, Keaton Masuda	Musical comedy	
	39年大相撲夏場所 後半戦	1964.05.31	Torahiko Ise [composition]			
	間諜中野学校 国籍のない男たち	1964.05.31	Haruyasu Noguchi			
Gate of Flesh	肉体の門	1964.05.31	Seijun Suzuki	Joe Shishido, Satoko Kasai, Yumiko Nogawa	Yakuza / Drama	
	女の十戒	1964.06.__	Kan Kataoka			
	女子学生の記録	1964.06.__	小角高治			
	女体の死角	1964.06.__	Kan Kataoka			
	女狼	1964.06.__	Satoru Kobayashi			
	独立グラマー部隊	1964.06.__	Kinya Ogawa			
	覗かれた個室	1964.06.__	Gorō Kadono			
	夜の魔性	1964.06.__	Namio Yuasa			
	夜の裸を探せ	1964.06.__	Daisuke Yoshimura			
	続・図々しい奴	1964.06.03	Masaharu Segawa			
The Great Duel	大殺陣	1964.06.03	Eiichi Kudō		Jidai-geki	
	十七才の狼	1964.06.05	Yoshio Inoue			
Suruga Pleasure Quarter: Gambling Storm	駿河遊侠伝 賭場荒し	1964.06.05	Kazuo Mori		Jidai-geki	
	おかあさんのばか	1964.06.07	Junzō Mizukawa			
	太陽を抱く女	1964.06.07	Yoshiaki Banshō			
Hot Spring Ghost	喜劇 駅前怪談	1964.06.11	Kozo Saeki	Hisaya Morishige, Junzaburo Ban, Frankie Sakai	Comedy	
The Gay Braggart	日本一のホラ吹き男	1964.06.11	Kengo Furusawa	Hitoshi Ueki, Mie Hama, Kyu Sazanka	Comedy	
	狼少年ケン 月夜の出来事	1964.06.14	Hiroshi Ikeda			
	おふくろ	1964.06.14	Osamu Sakai			
	路傍の石	1964.06.14	Miyoji Ieki			
	何処へ	1964.06.18	Katsumi Nishikawa			
	太陽西から昇る	1964.06.18	Mio Ezaki			
Tale of Evil Priest's Chivalry	悪坊主侠客伝	1964.06.20	Hideaki Ōnishi			
	黒の凶器	1964.06.20	Akira Inoue			
	銃殺	1964.06.20	Tsuneo Kobayashi			
	犯罪教室	1964.06.20	Shunkai Mizuho			
Daydream	白日夢	1964.06.21	Tetsuji Takechi	Kanako Michi	Pink	
	女体難破船	1964.06.26	Taizō Nanbu			
Shark	鮫	1964.06.27	Tomotaka Tasaka		Jidai-geki	
	死にざまを見ろ	1964.06.28	Takumi Furukawa			
Intentions of Murder	赤い殺意	1964.06.28	Shohei Imamura	Masumi Harukawa, Akira Nishimura, Shigeru Tsuyuguchi	Drama	
	恐るべき女子学生 思春期前期	1964.06.30	Kōe Shindō			
	血とダイヤモンド	1964.07.01	Jun Fukuda			
	裸の重役	1964.07.01	Yasuki Chiba			
	日本脱出	1964.07.04	Yoshishige Yoshida			
	無茶な奴	1964.07.04	Kōji Shima			
Assassination	暗殺	1964.07.04	Masahiro Shinoda	Tetsuro Tamba, Shima Iwashita, Eitaro Ozawa	Jidai-geki	
	妾の体に悪魔がいる	1964.07.08	Takeo Takagi			
	悪の紋章	1964.07.11	Hiromichi Horikawa			
	悪女	1964.07.11	Yūsuke Watanabe			
Shinobi no Mono 4: Siege	忍びの者 霧隠才蔵	1964.07.11	Tokuzō Tanaka		Jidai-geki / Ninja	
Gambler	博徒	1964.07.11	Shigehiro Ozawa		Yakuza	
	無責任遊侠伝	1964.07.11	Toshio Sugie			
Zatoichi's Flashing Sword	座頭市あばれ凧	1964.07.11	Kazuo Ikehiro	Shintaro Katsu, Naoko Kubo, Mayumi Nagisa	Jidai-geki / Chambara	
	鉄火場破り	1964.07.12	Buichi Saitō			
	風と樹と空と	1964.07.12	Akinori Matsuo			
	39年大相撲 波乱の名古屋場所	1964.07.15	Torahiko Ise [composition]			
	痴漢	1964.07.15	Tatsuo Asano			
	こちら婦人科	1964.07.18	Tsuneo Tabata			
	裸一貫	1964.07.18	Mitsuo Yagi			
	エイトマン ロボット007 光線銃レーサー	1964.07.21	Kiyoshi Ōnishi, Kōji Sasaki			
	鉄人28号 ミラクル魔術団 海底基地	1964.07.21	Yonehiko Watanabe, Kazuo Iohara			
	狼少年ケン サーカスから来た仲間	1964.07.21	Mimi Yamamoto			
	少年忍者 風のフジ丸 謎のアラビヤ人形	1964.07.21	Daisaku Shirakawa, Kimio Yabuki		Anime / Ninja	compilation of TV episodes
	鉄腕アトム 宇宙の勇者	1964.07.25	Eiichi Yamamoto, Atsushi Takagi, Shigeyuki Hayashi			
Black Trump Card	黒の切り札	1964.07.25	Umetsugu Inoue			
	卍	1964.07.25	Yasuzō Masumura			
Phantom Agents	忍者部隊月光	1964.07.28	Keinosuke Tsuchiya		Tokusatsu / Ninja	
Garakuta	がらくた	1964.08.01	Hiroshi Inagaki		Jidai-geki	
	海抜0米	1964.08.01	Yoshirō Kawazu			
	孤独	1964.08.01	Hirokazu Ichimura			
Crest of a Man: The Bravest	新・男の紋章 度胸一番	1964.08.01	Eisuke Takizawa		Yakuza	
The Spy Swordsman Returns	続・隠密剣士	1964.08.01	Sadao Funadoko		Jidai-geki / Ninja	
	天才詐欺師物語 狸の花道	1964.08.01	Kajirō Yamamoto			
	夢のハワイで盆踊り	1964.08.01	Ryūichi Takamori			
	赤い牝猫	1964.08.__	Taizō Nanbu			
	情怨の渦	1964.08.03	Hideo Ōhashi			
	魅力ある悪女	1964.08.03	Takeo Takagi			
	さすらいの賭博師	1964.08.05	Yōichi Ushihara			
Lone Wanderer	無宿者	1964.08.08	Kenji Misumi		Jidai-geki	
Bad Reputation's Drum	悪名太鼓	1964.08.08	Kazuo Mori	Shintaro Katsu, Jiro Tamiya, Yukiji Asaoka	Yakuza	
	挑まれた女	1964.08.11	Kei Miyaguchi			
Dogora	宇宙大怪獣 ドゴラ	1964.08.11	Ishirō Honda	Yosuke Natsuki	Science fiction	
Mumu Dance	喜劇 駅前音頭	1964.08.11	Kozo Saeki	Hisaya Morishige, Junzaburo Ban, Frankie Sakai		
	紅閨夢	1964.08.12	Tetsuji Takechi			
The Shogun's Vault	御金蔵破り	1964.08.13	Teruo Ishii		Jidai-geki	
Chilvarous Story of Japan	日本侠客伝	1964.08.13	Masahiro Makino		Yakuza	
	海賊船 海の虎	1964.08.14	Motomu Ida			
	帰郷	1964.08.14	Katsumi Nishikawa			
	行為の果て	1964.08.17	Toshiki Tatsumi			
Could I But Live	われ一粒の麦なれど	1964.08.18	Zenzō Matsuyama	Keiju Kobayashi, Hideko Takamine, Yoshie Mizutani	Drama	
	青い性	1964.08.22	Yoshio Inoue			
	続・高校三年生	1964.08.22	Tarō Yuge			
	女蕩し	1964.08.26	Saburō Ōi			
Shudan Bugyosho Yaburi	集団奉行所破り	1964.08.26	Yasuto Hasegawa		Jidai-geki	
Wolves, Pigs and People	狼と豚と人間	1964.08.26	Kinji Fukasaku		Yakuza	
	チョンリマ（千里馬）	1964.08.27	Yoshio Miyajima			
	西の王将 東の大将	1964.08.28	Kengo Furusawa			
	砂の上の植物群	1964.08.29	Kō Nakahira			
	人間に賭けるな	1964.08.29	Masuo Maeda			
	いも侍 蟹右衛門	1964.08.30	Hiroki Matsuno		Jidai-geki	
	戦場の野郎ども	1964.08.30	Manao Horiuchi			
	鉛の墓標	1964.09.01	Kōji Wakamatsu			
	痴情の家	1964.09.01	Kōji Seki			
	乾いた肌	1964.09.__	Kōji Wakamatsu			
	危険な人妻	1964.09.__	Rei Mizuno			
	逆情	1964.09.__	Kōji Wakamatsu			
	芸者っ子	1964.09.__	Tsutomu Murakami			
	砂の上の痴情 －青春－ その愛と死	1964.09.__	Kōe Shindō			
	浮気の季節	1964.09.__				
	網の中の女	1964.09.__	Kōji Wakamatsu			
	渇いた唇	1964.09.02	Kiyoshi Komori			
	海底犯罪NO．1	1964.09.05	Shigeo Tanaka			
Gaijin Bochi no Kettō	外人墓地の決斗	1964.09.05	Kimiyoshi Yasuda			
The Great Duel	大喧嘩	1964.09.05	Kōsaku Yamashita		Jidai-geki	
Ninja Hunt	忍者狩り	1964.09.05	Tetsuya Yamanouchi		Jidai-geki / Ninja	
	あゝ青春の胸の血は	1964.09.09	Kenjirō Morinaga			
	東京五輪音頭	1964.09.09	Isamu Kosugi			
	さまざまの夜	1964.09.12	Yoshiaki Banshō			
	渚を駆ける女	1964.09.12	Kinya Sakai			
Spy	間諜	1964.09.16	Tadashi Sawashima		Jidai-geki	
	列車大襲撃	1964.09.16	Miki Wakabayashi			
	喧嘩犬	1964.09.17	Mitsuo Murayama			
Suruga Pleasure Quarter: Broken Gambling	駿河遊侠伝 破れ鉄火	1964.09.17	Tokuzō Tanaka		Jidai-geki	
	39年大相撲秋場所 前半戦	1964.09.19	Torahiko Ise [composition]			
	愛と死をみつめて	1964.09.19	Buichi Saitō			
	殺人者を消せ	1964.09.19	Toshio Masuda			
Sweet Sweat	甘い汗	1964.09.19	Shiro Toyoda	Machiko Kyō, Keiji Sada, Eitaro Ozawa	Yakuza	
The Call of Flesh	女体	1964.09.19	Hideo Onchi	Reiko Dan, Koji Nanbara, Yuko Kusunoki		
	めもりい	1964.09.21	Osamu Tezuka			
	人魚	1964.09.21	Osamu Tezuka			
	明治大帝御一代記	1964.09.21	Mitsugu Ōkura			
	廓育ち	1964.09.23	Junya Satō			
Ryuko Ichidai	竜虎一代	1964.09.23	Tsuneo Kobayashi			
	殺された女	1964.10.__	Taizō Nanbu			
	処女の爪跡	1964.10.__	ロヅ恭			
	絶頂の女	1964.10.__	Masayuki Nishi			
	肉体の妖精	1964.10.__	Satoru Kobayashi			
	39年大相撲秋場所 後半戦	1964.10.03	Torahiko Ise [composition]			
Women Ninjas	くノ一忍法	1964.10.03	Sadao Nakajima		Jidai-geki / Ninja	
	これからのセックス 三つの性	1964.10.03	Shunkai Mizuho			
	散歩する霊柩車	1964.10.03	Hajime Satō			
	非行少年	1964.10.03	Kazuo Kawabe			
	悶え	1964.10.03	Umetsugu Inoue			
Our Blood Will Not Forgive	俺たちの血が許さない	1964.10.03	Seijun Suzuki	Akira Kobayashi, Hideki Takahashi	Yakuza / Crime	
	霧のラーラ	1964.10.04	Toshio Kitazato			
	新女・女・女物語	1964.10.04	Takeo Kurata, Kazutoshi Akutagawa			
	にっぽんぱらだいす	1964.10.04	Yōichi Maeda			
Les plus belles escroqueries du monde [Japanese segment: "Les Cinq Bienfaiteurs de Fumiko"]	世界詐欺物語 日本篇	1964.10.04	Hiromichi Horikawa [Japanese segment]	Mie Hama, Ken Mitsuda, Yatsuko Tanami	Crime	French-Italian-Japanese-Dutch co-production
The Car Thieves	自動車泥棒	1964.10.04	Yoshinori Wada	Rikiya Yasuoka, Davy Sheath, Toshio Kurosawa		
	早射ちジョー 砂丘の決斗	1964.10.11	Nozomu Yanase			
	洋妾	1964.10.14	Takeo Takagi			
Yagyu Chronicles 9: Assassin's Sword	十兵衛暗殺剣	1964.10.14	Junji Kurata		Jidai-geki / Ninja	
	赤いダイヤ	1964.10.14	Michio Konishi			
Banji okane	万事お金	1964.10.14	Shue Matsubayashi	Kyu Sakamoto, Yuriko Hoshi, Ichiro Arishima		
The Gorgeous Geisha	沙羅の門	1964.10.14	Seiji Hisamatsu	Reiko Dan, Mitsuko Kusabue, Hisaya Morishige		
The Treasure of Death Castle	コレラの城	1964.10.15	Yasushi Kikuchi, Tetsurō Tanba		Jidai-geki	
	男の影	1964.10.15	Yoshikazu Ōtsuki			
Sleepy Eyes of Death: Sword of Seduction	眠狂四郎女妖剣	1964.10.17	Kazuo Ikehiro		Jidai-geki	
Fight, Zatoichi, Fight	座頭市血笑旅	1964.10.17	Kenji Misumi	Shintaro Katsu, Nobuo Kaneko, Gen Kimura	Jidai-geki / Chambara	
	性と生殖の神秘	1964.10.20	Satoru Kobayashi			
Irezumi Totsugekitai	いれずみ突撃隊	1964.10.21	Teruo Ishii		Yakuza	
	おんなの渦と淵と流れ	1964.10.21	Kō Nakahira			
Prison Gambler	監獄博徒	1964.10.21	Shigehiro Ozawa		Yakuza	
	日本拷問刑罰史	1964.10.27	Kiyoshi Komori			
	夜だけの未亡人	1964.10.28	Kei Miyaguchi			
	黒いダイスが俺を呼ぶ	1964.10.30	Motomu Ida			
	敗れざるもの	1964.10.30	Akinori Matsuo			
	黒の超特急	1964.10.31	Yasuzō Masumura			
Seifuku no Ōkami	制服の狼	1964.10.31	Tarō Yuge			
Kigeki Ekimae tenjin	喜劇 駅前天神	1964.10.31	Kozo Saeki	Hisaya Morishige, Junzaburo Ban, Frankie Sakai		
The Rise of a Sandal Keeper	ホラ吹き太閤記	1964.10.31	Kengo Fururawa	Hitoshi Ueki, Mie Hama, Hajime Hana		
	裸虫	1964.11.01	Tsutomu Konno			
	夜の片鱗	1964.11.01	Noboru Nakamura			
	恋人よ	1964.11.01	Kazui Nihonmatsu			
	血だらけの乳房	1964.11.__	Taizō Nanbu			
	悶える女子学生	1964.11.__	Taizō Nanbu			
Revenge	仇討	1964.11.01	Tadashi Imai	Kinnosuke Nakamura, Takahiro Tamura	Jidai-geki	
	おんな	1964.11.10	Hajime Izu			
	殺られてたまるか	1964.11.11	Tokujirō Yamazaki			
Crest of a Man: Flower and Long Sword	男の紋章 花と長脇差	1964.11.11	Eisuke Takizawa		Yakuza	
	この空のある限り	1964.11.14	Hideo Sakurai			
	検事霧島三郎	1964.11.14	Shigeo Tanaka			
	十七才のこの胸に	1964.11.14	Ryūichi Takamori			
Samurai Gambler	博徒ざむらい	1964.11.14	Kazuo Mori		Jidai-geki	
	五辧の椿	1964.11.21	Yoshitarō Nomura			
	肉体の盛装	1964.11.21	Shinji Murayama			
	牝	1964.11.21	Yūsuke Watanabe			
Onibaba	鬼婆	1964.11.21	Kaneto Shindo	Nobuko Otowa, Jitsuko Yoshimura, Kei Satō	Jidai-geki	
Gendai shinshi yaro	現代紳士野郎	1964.11.21	Seiji Maruyama	Tadao Takashima, Yoko Tsukasa, Yuki Nakagawa		
	うず潮	1964.11.22	Buichi Saitō			
	執炎	1964.11.22	Koreyoshi Kurahara			
	快楽の報酬 悪魔	1964.11.28	Fukujirō Yamazaki			
	勝負は夜つけろ	1964.11.28	Akira Inoue			
Kojiki taisho	乞食大将	1964.11.28	Tokuzō Tanaka	Shintarō Katsu, Yukiko Fuji, Jun Fujimaki	Jidai-geki	
	制服の女豹	1964.12.01	Jun Matsuura			
	雌・メス・牝	1964.12.__	Kinya Ogawa			
	十七才の絶叫	1964.12.__	Taira Takano			
	女はそれを待っている	1964.12.__	Saburō Kyōdō			
	白い肌の脱出	1964.12.__	Kōji Wakamatsu			
	39年大相撲九州場所	1964.12.02	Torahiko Ise [composition]			
	刑事	1964.12.05	Kiyoshi Saeki			
	警視庁物語 行方不明	1964.12.05	Michio Konishi			
	河内ぞろ 喧嘩軍鶏	1964.12.06	Toshio Masuda			
	大日本コソ泥伝	1964.12.06	Masahisa Sunohara		Comedy	
Rudolph the Red-Nosed Reindeer	ルドルフ 赤鼻のトナカイ	1964.12.09	Larry Roemer		Animated	
	団地七つの大罪	1964.12.09	Yasuki Chiba, Masanori Kakei			
International Secret Police: Keg of Gunpowder	国際秘密警察 火薬の樽	1964.12.09	Takashi Tsuboshima	Tatsuya Mihashi, Makoto Sato, Yuriko Hoshi		
The Spying Sorceress	くノ一化粧	1964.12.12	Sadao Nakajima		Jidai-geki / Ninja	
	愛 その奇跡	1964.12.12	Tsuneo Tabata			
Cruelty of Shogunate's Downfall	幕末残酷物語	1964.12.12	Tai Katō		Jidai-geki	
	明日の夢があふれてる	1964.12.12	Yoshiaki Banshō			
	ギター抱えたひとり旅	1964.12.19	Tokujirō Yamazaki			
	幸せなら手をたたこう	1964.12.19	Noriaki Yuasa			
	十七才は一度だけ	1964.12.19	Yoshio Inoue			
Crest of a Man: The Ambush	男の紋章 喧嘩状	1964.12.19	Motomu Ida		Yakuza	
Ghidorah, the Three-Headed Monster	三大怪獣 地球最大の決戦	1964.12.20	Ishirō Honda	Yosuke Natsuki, Hiroshi Koizumi, Yuriko Hoshi		
Samurai Joker	花のお江戸の無責任	1964.12.20	Kajiro Yamamoto	Hitoshi Ueki, Kei Tani, Hajime Hana	Jidai-geki spoof	
	続・妾	1964.12.21	Hideo Ōhashi			
The Thief in Black	黒の盗賊	1964.12.24	Umetsugu Inoue		Jidai-geki / Ninja	
Gamblers vs Racketeers	博徒対テキ屋	1964.12.24	Shigehiro Ozawa		Yakuza	
Ninja Breakup by Assassination	忍法破り必殺	1964.12.26	Meijirō Umetsu		Jidai-geki / Ninja	
	馬鹿が戦車でやって来る	1964.12.26	Yōji Yamada			
	三匹の十七才	1964.12.29	川合茂貴			
	入れ墨お蝶	1964.12.29	Kiyoshi Komori			
Shinobi no Mono 5: Mist Saizo Returns	忍びの者 続・霧隠才蔵	1964.12.30	Kazuo Ikehiro		Jidai-geki / Ninja	
Adventures of Zatoichi	座頭市関所破り	1964.12.30	Kimiyoshi Yasuda	Shintaro Katsu, Eiko Taki, Miwa Takada	Jidai-geki / Chambara	
	黒い海峡	1964.12.31	Mio Ezaki			
	若草物語	1964.12.31	Kenjirō Morinaga			

== See also ==
- 1964 in Japan
- 1964 in Japanese television
