= Zatoichi the Fugitive =

- Film poster
- Directed by: Tokuzō Tanaka
- Written by: Minoru Inuzuka; Seiji Hoshikawa
- Produced by: Masaichi Nagata
- Starring: Shintaro Katsu; Miwa Takada; Sachiko Murase
- Cinematography: Chishi Makiura
- Music by: Akira Ifukube
- Release date: August 10, 1963 (Japan)
- Running time: 86 minutes
- Country: Japan
- Language: Japanese

Zatoichi: The Fugitive (Japanese: 座頭市兇状旅, Hepburn: Zatōichi Kyōjō tabi) is a 1963 Japanese Chambara film directed by Tokuzō Tanaka starring Shintaro Katsu as the blind masseur Zatoichi, originally released by the Daiei Motion Picture Company (now known as Kadokawa Pictures). Zatoichi: The Fugitive is the fourth episode in the 26 part film series devoted to the character of Zatoichi.

== Plot ==
Ichi (which is the main character's name, Zato being the lowest rank in the Todoza) travels by foot and enters a local sumo match to earn prize money. Ichi defeats five sighted opponents to win. He is later alone and is attacked by Kisuke, a young yakuza man he has never met. Kisuke is easily dispatched and Ichi berates him for being no match for Ichi and asks why he attacked him. Kisuke tells Ichi that he did it to get ten Ryō reward for killing Ichi. Before dying Kisuke reveals to Ichi that his mother is also yakuza but dies before revealing who placed the bounty on Ichi's head. Ichi travels to the local yakuza house of the Shimonida yakuza family. Just prior to Ichi's arrival Maki, the mother of Kisuke and a grandmother figure to the yakuza is with several visiting yakuza family bosses and the young new heir to the Shimonida yakuza family, Sakichi. The bosses are meeting during a local festival. Ichi meets Maki and confessing to the death of Kisuke and asks Maki's forgiveness. He tells that he killed Kisuke in a fair fight according to the yakuza code. This comforts Maki and she recognizes Ichi as honorable. Ichi gives her ten Ryō which he claims Kisuke asked him to give to her.

Meanwhile, Ichi stays at an inn in the town and comes across a woman he carried passionate feelings for, and possibly still does, by the name of Otane (whom Ichi affectionately calls Tane). Tane is not married to a carpenter, as she planned when last seen in a film, but to a quick-tempered ronin named Tanakura. She tells Ichi that she and her husband have done many bad things. The inn keeper's adopted daughter Nobu is in love with Sakichi but her father Shimazo does not approve of him. One of the visiting yakuza, Boss Yagiri sees the Sakichi as a weak boss and wishes to move in on the territory and demands that Ichi be killed or the Sakichi will lose his position. Yagiri plots with innkeeper Shimazo to have Sakichi and Ichi killed. It is later revealed that Shimazo is motivated to eliminate Sakichi because when his father was boss he took away a yakuza gambling house that Shimazo ran.

In front of the yakuza leaders during their celebration which Ichi interrupts Tanakura, displaying his prowess but also as an act of showing Tane belonging to him, cuts Ichi's tea cup in half. In response, Ichi cuts a sake bottle in half while it is still being held. Tanakura admits defeat and establishes himself as Ichi's "rival" in this film because of his act.

Sakichi tells Ichi that the yakuza have taken Tane hostage. He rushes to the old abandoned inn where Nobu grew up as a child and sees that Tane is safe and well. The yakuza surround the inn and attack. One of the men uses a rifle to fire 3 shots (which all miss) with the inheritor, Nobu, and Ichi still inside. Tane goes outside and pleads with her husband not to attack, that she loves him and that she wants him to stay alive which will not happen if he faces Ichi. However, Tanakura is determined to claim the now 300 Ryō bounty on Ichi's head and to dispatch the rival to his wife's affection. Tane mistakenly partly draws his sword and he kills her instantly. Nobu sees this and tells Ichi. The news sends Ichi into a rage, he bursts outside, slaughters most of the several dozen yakuza then faces Tanakura in what is one of the most critically revered duels in the Zatoichi series. During the battle Ichi's sword is broken but he stabs Tanakura with a dagger hidden in the sword's handle. As he dies Tanakura says that Ichi did not know Tane but only had a romanticized image of her, that the ambush was actually her idea to get the reward.

The film concludes with Maki wishing that Ichi was her son, Ichi calling her mother and Ichi placing Nobu's hand in the hand of Sakichi before he again wanders away alone.

== Cast ==
- Shintaro Katsu as Ichi, the Blind Swordsman
- Miwa Takada as O-Nobu
- Masayo Banri as O-Tane
- Junichiro Narita as Sakichi
- Katsuhiko Kobayashi as Kisuke
- Toru Abe as Boss Yagiri Tokyuro
- Koichi Mizuhara as Boss Unosuke
- Jutaro Hojo as Master Tanakura
- Sachiko Murase as Maki
- Hiroshi Nawa as Chuji of Kunisada
- Koichi Mizukami as Boss Unosuke
- Yasuhiro Mizukami as Boss Tamamura

== Production ==
- Director Tokuzo Tanaka
- Screenplay Seiji Hoshikawa
- Original Story Kan Shimozawa
- Music Akira Ifukube
