= 1964 in Japan =

- Decades: 1940s; 1950s; 1960s; 1970s; 1980s
- See also: Other events of 1964; History of Japan • Timeline • Years

Events in the year 1964 in Japan. It corresponds to Shōwa 39 (昭和39年) in the Japanese calendar.

1964 is considered a seminal year in modern Japanese history. The Tokyo Summer Olympic Games and the first run of bullet train reflected a society-wide sense that post-war reconstruction was over and that Japan had rejoined the international family of nations. Diplomatic negotiations underway this year between South Korea and Japan resulted in a formal normalization of relations the following year.

== Incumbents ==
- Emperor: Hirohito
- Prime Minister: Hayato Ikeda (L–Hiroshima, 3rd term) until November 9, Eisaku Satō (L–Yamaguchi)
- Chief Cabinet Secretary: Yasumi Kurogane (L–Yamagata) until July 18, Zenkō Suzuki (L–Iwate) until November 9, Tomisaburō Hashimoto (L–Ibaraki)
- Chief Justice of the Supreme Court: Kisaburō Yokota
- President of the House of Representatives: Naka Funada (L–Tochigi)
- President of the House of Councillors: Yūzō Shigemune (L–national)
- Diet sessions: 46th (regular session opened in December 1963, to June 26), 47th (extraordinary, November 9 to December 18), 48th (regular, December 21 to 1965, June 1)

=== Governors ===
- Aichi Prefecture: Mikine Kuwahara
- Akita Prefecture: Yūjirō Obata
- Aomori Prefecture: Shunkichi Takeuchi
- Chiba Prefecture: Taketo Tomonō
- Ehime Prefecture: Sadatake Hisamatsu
- Fukui Prefecture: Eizō Kita
- Fukuoka Prefecture: Taichi Uzaki
- Fukushima Prefecture: Zenichiro Satō (until 23 March); Morie Kimura (starting 16 May)
- Gifu Prefecture: Yukiyasu Matsuno
- Gunma Prefecture: Konroku Kanda
- Hiroshima Prefecture: Iduo Nagano
- Hokkaido: Kingo Machimura
- Hyogo Prefecture: Motohiko Kanai
- Ibaraki Prefecture: Nirō Iwakami
- Ishikawa Prefecture: Yōichi Nakanishi
- Iwate Prefecture: Tadashi Chida
- Kagawa Prefecture: Masanori Kaneko
- Kagoshima Prefecture: Katsushi Terazono
- Kanagawa Prefecture: Iwataro Uchiyama
- Kochi Prefecture: Masumi Mizobuchi
- Kumamoto Prefecture: Kōsaku Teramoto
- Kyoto Prefecture: Torazō Ninagawa
- Mie Prefecture: Satoru Tanaka
- Miyagi Prefecture: Yoshio Miura
- Miyazaki Prefecture: Hiroshi Kuroki
- Nagano Prefecture: Gon'ichirō Nishizawa
- Nagasaki Prefecture: Katsuya Sato
- Nara Prefecture: Ryozo Okuda
- Niigata Prefecture: Juichiro Tsukada
- Oita Prefecture: Kaoru Kinoshita
- Okayama Prefecture: Yukiharu Miki (until 21 September); Takenori Kato (starting 15 November)
- Osaka Prefecture: Gisen Satō
- Saga Prefecture: Sunao Ikeda
- Saitama Prefecture: Hiroshi Kurihara
- Shiga Prefecture: Kyujiro Taniguchi
- Shiname Prefecture: Choemon Tanabe
- Shizuoka Prefecture: Toshio Saitō
- Tochigi Prefecture: Nobuo Yokokawa
- Tokushima Prefecture: Kikutaro Hara
- Tokyo: Ryōtarō Azuma
- Tottori Prefecture: Jirō Ishiba
- Toyama Prefecture: Minoru Yoshida
- Wakayama Prefecture: Shinji Ono
- Yamagata Prefecture: Tōkichi Abiko
- Yamaguchi Prefecture: Masayuki Hashimoto
- Yamanashi Prefecture: Hisashi Amano

== Events ==
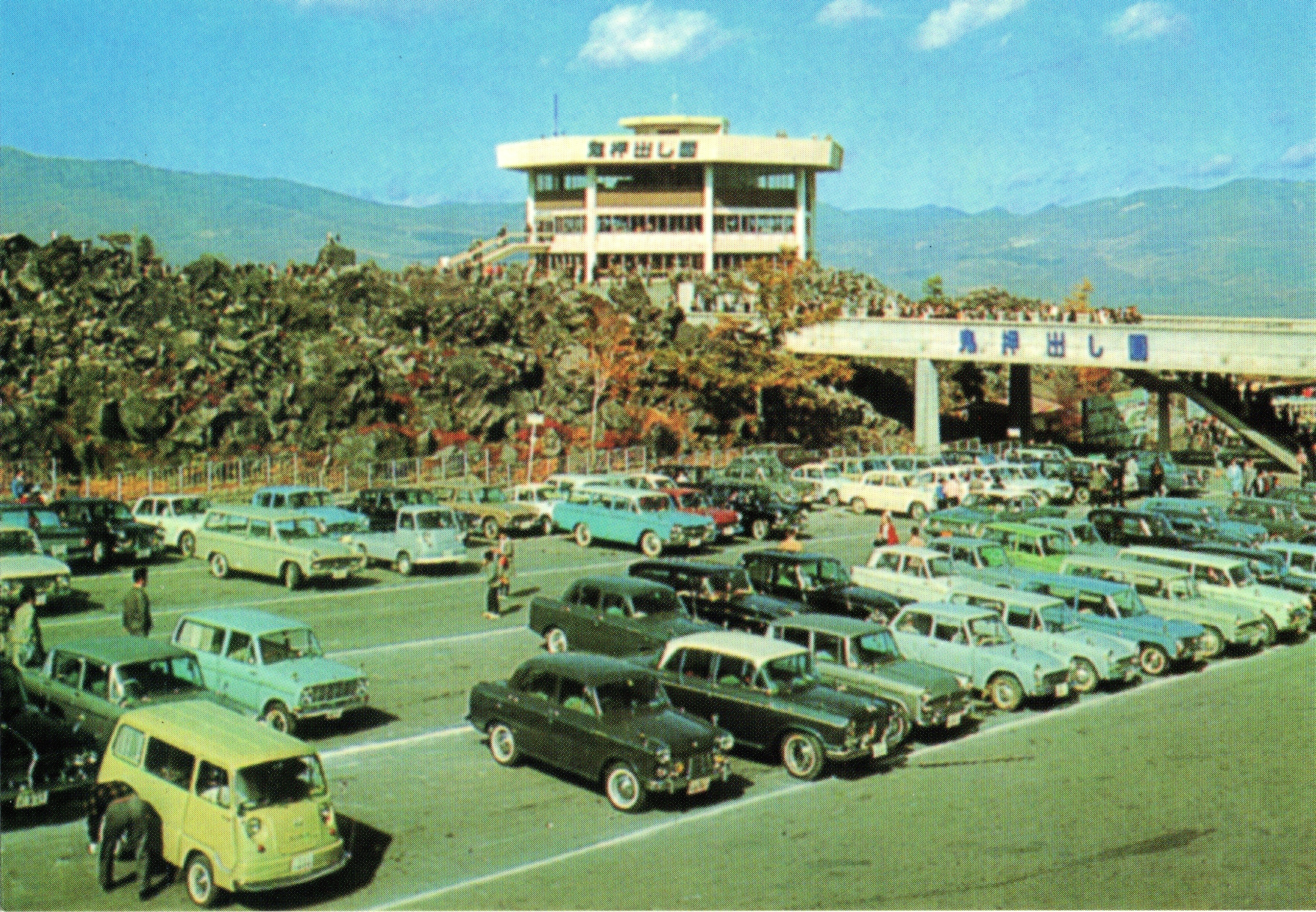
Parking lot in Japan circa 1964

- March 18: Hayakawa Electric (the predecessor of today's Sharp) and Sony announce that they have completed a prototype electronic calculator using Japanese-manufactured diodes and transistors.
- March 24: U.S. ambassador Edwin Reischauer is stabbed by a Japanese youth.
- April 1: Japanese citizens are permitted to freely travel overseas.
- April 12: Channel 12, the predecessor of TV Tokyo, begins operations.
- April 17 – Orient Lease, as predecessor of Orix Group founded in Osaka.
- April 29 – The Keiō Dōbutsuen Line opens.
- June 16: An earthquake in Niigata Prefecture kills 12.
- July 14: According to Japan Fire and Disaster Management Agency official confirmed report, a Katsushima Warehouse caught fire and explode in Shinagawa, Tokyo, total 19 person were human fatalities and 117 persons were wounded.
- July 18: A heavy rain, following devastate flood and landslide in Shimane and Tottori Prefecture, at least 128 people lives.
- August 18 – The International Olympic Committee bans South Africa from the Tokyo Olympics on the grounds that its teams are racially segregated.
- September 17: The Tokyo Monorail begins operations.
- October 1: The Tōkaidō Shinkansen begins operations.
- October 10–24: 1964 Summer Olympics held in Tokyo. Judo introduced for the first time as an Olympic Game.
- October 25: Ikeda Hayato resigns as prime minister; Eisaku Satō is elected to replace him.
- November 9: Sato announces his first cabinet.
- November 17: The political party Komeito is formed.
- December 23: Tokyo Metro Tōzai Line was opened.

== Births ==
- January 1: Akemi Masuda, athlete
- January 4: Riki Takeuchi, actor
- January 25: Seiko Senou, actor of 1987 Metal Hero Series Choujinki Metalder.
- February 13: Tetsurō Degawa, comedian
- March 8: Hiroshi Tsuburaya, actor of 1984 Space Sheriff Series Uchuu Keiji Shaider (d. 2001).
- March 9: Tomomitsu Niimi, criminal (d. 2018)
- March 12: Kaori Ekuni, author
- March 18:
  - Mika Kanai, voice actress and singer
  - Yoko Kanno, pianist and songwriter
- April 23: Rie Ishizuka, voice actress
- April 30: Misa Watanabe, voice actress
- May 5: Minami Takayama, singer and voice actress
- May 6: Daisuke Araki, former professional baseball player
- May 31: Yukio Edano, politician
- June 12: Takashi Yamazaki, filmmaker
- June 22: Hiroshi Abe, model and actor
- June 23: Tomonohana Shinya, sumo wrestler and coach
- July 3: Toshiharu Sakurai, voice actor
- July 7: Shinichi Tsutsumi, actor
- July 9: Kazumi Kawai, actress (d. 1997)
- July 14: Kippei Shiina, actor
- July 19: Masahiko Kondō, solo singer of Johnny & Associates
- July 24: Banana Yoshimoto, author
- July 25: Reiko Takashima, actress
- August 10: Hiro Takahashi, singer, lyricist, and composer (d. 2005)
- September 13: Junko Mihara, politician, former singer, and actress
- September 23: Koshi Inaba, singer of B'z
- October 5:
  - Keiji Fujiwara, voice actor
  - Seiko Hashimoto, ice speed skater
  - Megumi Yokota, one of the North Korean abductee victims of the late 1970s (d. ca. 1977?)
- October 12: Masaru Ogawa, figure skater
- October 18: Etsuko Inoue, tennis player
- October 20: Tomoko Yamaguchi, actress
- October 24: Kotaro Tanaka, actor of 1991 Super Sentai Chōjin Sentai Jetman as Red Hawk/Ryu Tendou.
- November 4: Yūko Mizutani, voice actress (d. 2016)
- December 13: hide, musician (d. 1998)
- December 15: Norihisa Tamura, politician
- December 23: Kazuhiro Koshi, skeleton racer
- December 28: Kaori Yamaguchi, judoka

== Deaths ==
- February 8: Boshirō Hosogaya, admiral (b. 1888)
- February 17: Chūichi Hara, admiral (b. 1889)
- April 5: Tatsuji Miyoshi, poet, literary critic, and editor (b. 1900)
- May 5: Tadao Ikeda, director and screenwriter (b. 1905)
- May 6: Haruo Satō, novelist and poet (b. 1892)
- May 8: Kichisaburo Nomura, politician and military leader (b. 1877)
- August 17: Keiji Sada, actor (b. 1926)
- November 29: Ryūsaku Tsunoda, educator and historian (b. 1877)

== Statistics ==
- Yen value: US$1 = ¥360 (fixed)

== See also ==
- 1964 in Japanese television
- List of Japanese films of 1964
- 1964 in Japanese music
