= List of French films of 1964 =

A list of films produced in France in 1964.

Title	Director	Cast	Genre	Notes
All About Loving'	Jean Aurel	Anna Karina, Michel Piccoli, Jean Sorel	Comedy, romance	French-Italian co-production
Among Vultures	Alfred Vohrer	Stewart Granger, Pierre Brice, Elke Sommer	Western	West German-Italian-Yugoslavian-French co-production
Anatomy of a Marriage: My Days with Françoise	André Cayatte	Marie-José Nat, Jacques Charrier	Drama	French-Italian-West German co-production
Anatomy of a Marriage: My Days with Jean-Marc	André Cayatte	Jacques Charrier, Marie-José Nat	Drama	French-Italian-West-German co-production
Angélique, Marquise des Anges	Bernard Borderie	Michèle Mercier, Robert Hossein, Jean Rochefort	Adventure	French-West German-Italian co-production
The Ape Woman	Marco Ferreri	Ugo Tognazzi, Annie Girardot, Elvira Paolone	Drama	Italian-French co-production
Bande à part	Jean-Luc Godard	Anna Karina, Claude Brasseur, Sami Frey	Drama	
The Big Hit	Jean Valère	Emmanuelle Riva, Hardy Krüger, Francisco Rabal	Crime	French-Italian co-production
Blood and Black Lace	Mario Bava	Cameron Mitchell, Eva Bartok	Thriller	Italian-West German-French co-production
Castle of Blood	Antonio Margheriti	Georges Rivière, Barbara Steele, Montgomery Glenn	Horror	Italian-French co-production
Castle of the Living Dead	Warren Kiefer	Christopher Lee, Gaia Germani, Philippe Leroy	Horror	Italian-French co-production
Champagne for Savages	Christian-Jaque	Francis Blanche, Boy Gobert, Antonella Lualdi, Adolfo Marsillach, Claude Nicot, Dominique Paturel	War	French-Spanish-Italian co-production
Circle of Love	Roger Vadim	Jean-Claude Brialy, Jane Fonda, Anna Karina	Drama, romance	French-Italian co-production
Coplan Takes Risks	Maurice Labro	Dominique Paturel, Virna Lisi, Jacques Balutin	Spy	Co-production with Italy
The Counterfeit Constable	Robert Dhéry, Pierre Tchernia	Pierre Tornade, Pierre Doris, Raymond Bussières, Jean Richard, Catherine Sola, Robert Dhéry, Mark Lester, Ronald Fraser, Diana Dors, Colette Brosset, Arthur Mullard, Percy Herbert, Amy Dalby, Bernard Cribbins, Robert Burnier	Comedy	
Diary of a Chambermaid	Luis Buñuel	Jeanne Moreau, Michel Piccoli, Georges Géret	Drama	French-Italian co-production
Fantômas	André Hunebelle	Jean Marais, Louis de Funès, Mylène Demongeot	Comedy, crime	French-Italian co-production
Gibraltar	Pierre Gaspard-Huit	Hildegard Knef, Gérard Barray, Geneviève Grad	Spy	French-Italian-Spanish co-production
The Gospel According to St. Matthew	Pier Paolo Pasolini	Enrique Irazoqui, Margherita Caruso, Susanna Pasolini	Drama	Italian-French co-production
Greed in the Sun	Henri Verneuil	Jean-Paul Belmondo, Lino Ventura, Reginald Kernan	Adventure	French-Italian co-production
Hardi Pardaillan!	Bernard Borderie	Gérard Barray, Valérie Lagrange, Philippe Lemaire	Adventure	French-Italian co-production
How Do You Like My Sister?	Michel Boisrond	France Anglade, Jacqueline Maillan, Claude Rich	Comedy	
Jeff Gordon, Secret Agent	Raoul André	Eddie Constantine, Perrette Pradier, Daniel Emilfork, Clément Harari, Jean Galland, Paul Bonifas, Daphne Dale, Sophie Hardy	Spy	French-Italian co-production
Joy House	René Clément	Alain Delon, Jane Fonda, Lola Albright	Thriller	
La Difficulté d'être infidèle	Bernard Toublanc-Michel	Michele Grellier, Bernard Tiphaine	Comedy-drama	
La Tulipe noire	Christian-Jaque	Alain Delon, Dawn Addams, Virna Lisi	Adventure	French-Italian-Spanish co-production
Last of the Renegades	Harald Reinl	Lex Barker, Pierre Brice, Anthony Steel	Western	West German-Yugoslavian-French-Italian co-production
Le gendarme de Saint-Tropez	Jean Girault	Louis de Funès, Michel Galabru, Geneviève Grad	Comedy, crime	
Le Tigre aime la chair fraiche	Claude Chabrol	Roger Hanin, Daniela Bianchi, Maria Mauban	Spy	French-Italian co-production
Les amitiés particulières	Jean Delannoy	Didier Haudepin, Francis Lacombrade, Michel Bouquet	Drama	
Les Barbouzes	Georges Lautner	Lino Ventura, Bernard Blier, Francis Blanche	Comedy, spy	
Les Pas perdus	Jacques Robin	Michèle Morgan, Jean-Louis Trintignant, Catherine Rouvel	Drama	
Les plus belles escroqueries du monde	Various	Various	Crime	French-Italian-Japanese-Dutch co-production
Let the Shooters Shoot	Guy Lefranc	Eddie Constantine, Daphne Dale, Maria Grazia Spina	Spy	French-Italian co-production
Lucky Jo	Michel Deville	Eddie Constantine, Pierre Brasseur, Christiane Minazzoli	Crime comedy	
License to Kill	Henri Decoin	Eddie Constantine, Daphne Dale	Spy	French-Italian co-production
Male Companion	Philippe de Broca	Jean-Pierre Cassel, Irina Demick, Jean-Claude Brialy	Comedy	
Marriage Italian-Style	Vittorio De Sica	Sophia Loren, Marcello Mastroianni, Aldo Puglisi	Comedy-drama, romance	Italian-French co-production
A Married Woman	Jean-Luc Godard	Bernard Noël, Macha Méril, Philippe Leroy	Drama	
Mata Hari, Agent H21	Jean-Louis Richard	Jeanne Moreau, Jean-Louis Trintignant, Frank Villard	Spy	French-Italian co-production
Monsieur	Jean-Paul Le Chanois	Jean Gabin, Liselotte Pulver	Comedy	French-Italian-West German co-production
Nothing Ever Happens	Juan Antonio Bardem	Corinne Marchand, Antonio Casas, Jean-Pierre Cassel, Julia Gutiérrez Caba	Drama	Spanish-French co-production
Old Shatterhand	Hugo Fregonese	Pierre Brice, Lex Barker, Daliah Lavi	Western	West German-French-Italian-Yugoslavian co-production
Que personne ne sorte	Ivan Govar	Philippe Nicaud, Jacqueline Maillan, Marie Daëms, Jean-Pierre Marielle, Jess Hahn	Comedy crime	French-Belgium co-production
Red Desert	Michelangelo Antonioni	Monica Vitti, Richard Harris, Carlo Chionetti	Drama	Italian-French co-production
Relax Darling	Jean Boyer	Fernandel, Sandra Milo, Jean-Pierre Marielle	Comedy	French-Italian co-production
The Secret of Dr. Mabuse	Hugo Fregonese	Peter van Eyck, O.E. Hasse	Science fiction, thriller	West German-Italian-French co-production
Seduced and Abandoned	Pietro Germi	Stefania Sandrelli, Saro Urzi, Leopoldo Trieste	Comedy	Italian-French co-production
Shadow of Evil	André Hunebelle	Kerwin Mathews, Robert Hossein, Pier Angeli, Dominique Wilms	Spy	French-Italian co-production
The Soft Skin	François Truffaut	Jean Desailly, Françoise Dorléac, Nelly Benedetti	Drama	
That Man from Rio	Philippe de Broca	Jean-Paul Belmondo, Françoise Dorléac, Jean Servais	Adventure	French-Italian co-production
That Tender Age	Gilles Grangier	Jean Gabin, Fernandel, Marie Dubois	Comedy	
The Train	John Frankenheimer	Burt Lancaster, Paul Scofield	War	French-Italian‐American co-production
The Umbrellas of Cherbourg	Jacques Demy	Catherine Deneuve, Nino Castelnuovo, Anne Vernon	Musical, romance	French-West German co-production
Une ravissante idiote	Édouard Molinaro	Brigitte Bardot, Anthony Perkins, Jean-Marc Tennberg	Comedy, spy film	French-Italian co-production
Weekend at Dunkirk	Henri Verneuil	Jean-Paul Belmondo, Catherine Spaak, François Périer	War	French-Italian co-production
World Without Sun	Jacques-Yves Cousteau		Documentary	French-Italian co-production

== See also ==
- 1964 in France
