= 1964 in Japanese television =

Events in 1964 in Japanese television.

== Events ==
- April 12: Tokyo 12 Channel, the last VHF television station to open in Japan, signs on. The station used an educational license until October 31, 1973.
- July 9: NHK's ninth chairman Shinnosuke Abe suddenly died at the age of 80. He is replaced by Yoshinori Maeda (in office until July 1973).
- August 31: Music Fair started broadcasting on Fuji TV.
- August 31: NHK Fukuoka, RKB Mainichi Broadcasting, Kyushu Asahi Broadcasting and TV Nishinippon jointly set up a UHF analog relay station (Kurume Relay Station) on Kusenbuyama on the border of Fukuoka and Saga prefectures. The area of the Fukuoka stations is expanded to include the Chikugo region of Fukuoka Prefecture, the entire Saga Prefecture, and the western part of Oita Prefecture.
- September 1: Kansai TV introduces its 8 mark, used until the start of the 2015 fiscal year.
- September 1: CBC Television and Tokai Television start color broadcasting.
- September 6: The pioneering drama Dial 110, on NTV, ends after seven years and 364 episodes.
- September 7: Fuji TV starts color broadcasts, the third commercial station in Tokyo to do so after NTV and TBS.
- October 1: TV Nishinippon (TNC) changed affiliations from Nippon TV to Fuji TV. Along with this, Kyushu Asahi Broadcasting (KBC), which was a dual affiliate of NET TV and Fuji TV, will become a single affiliate of NET TV. In addition, some of NTV's programs were transferred to RKB Mainichi Broadcasting (RKB, TBS affiliate). Until the opening of Fukuoka Broadcasting (FBS) in April 1969, NTV has no affiliates in Kyushu.
- October 1: Yamaguchi Broadcasting (KRY)'s Kanmon Television Station (Shimonoseki City, Yamaguchi Prefecture) broadcast a different lineup from the Tokuyama (currently Shunan) Television Station (Tokuyama City, Yamaguchi Prefecture (currently Shunan City)) until the changes in Fukuoka mentioned above. From now on, the two stations broadcast the same content (Nippon Television) as the parent station in Tokuyama. Until then, Kanmon Television was headquartered in Fukuoka Prefecture, the neighboring prefecture, and since TNC, which also covers the western part of Yamaguchi Prefecture, was affiliated with Nippon Television, its programming was centered on NET TV and Fuji TV programs. So, it was an unusual form that was unprecedented in the whole country where a different organization was formed at a broadcasting station operated by the same company.
- October 1: The NHK stations in Matsuyama and Kochi and two commercial stations (Shikoku Broadcasting and Nankai Broadcasting) start color broadcasts.
- October 5: Nishinippon Broadcasting starts airing networked programs in color.
- October 10 to 24: The 1964 Tokyo Olympics was held. NHK and commercial broadcasters broadcast the opening ceremony, including NHK General, which recorded an audience rating of 61.2% (Kanto region, video research survey). The Tokyo Olympics, the first modern Olympic Games to be held in Japan, were broadcast live on NHK every day in color, for the closing ceremony and 16 out of 20 events. The women's volleyball final (against the Soviet Union) recorded the highest audience rating of 85%. With the success of the Tokyo Olympics, color TVs rapidly spread to homes. After the Tokyo Olympics ended, NHK began researching next-generation high-definition television. This led to the birth of today's high-definition.

== Debuts ==
Show	Station	Premiere Date	Genre	Original Run
Hyokkori Hyō Tanjima	NHK	April 6	anime	April 6, 1964 – April 4, 1969
Shōnen Ninja Kaze no Fujimaru	NET	June 7	anime	June 7, 1964 – August 31, 1965
Shinobi no Mono	NET	July 24	drama	July 24, 1964 – July 30, 1965
Big X	TBS	August 3	anime	August 3, 1964 – September 27, 1965
Music Fair	Fuji TV	August 31	music	August 31, 1964 – present
Phantom Agents	Fuji TV	January 3	drama	January 3, 1964 – October 2, 1966

== Ongoing ==
- Galaxy Boy Troop, anime (1963–1965)
- Mighty Atom, anime (1963–1966)
- Tetsujin 28-go, anime (1963–1966)

== Endings ==
Show	Station	Ending Date	Genre	Original Run
8 Man	TBS	December 31	anime	November 7, 1963 – December 31, 1964
Akatsuki	NHK	April 4	drama	April 1, 1963 – April 4, 1964
Shisukon Ōji	Fuji TV	March 27	stop motion anime	December 20, 1963 – March 27, 1964
The New Adventures of Pinocchio	Fuji TV	March 27	stop motion anime	December 20, 1963 – March 27, 1964
Sennin Buraku	Fuji TV	February 23	anime	September 4, 1963 – February 23, 1964

== See also ==
- 1964 in anime
- 1964 in Japan
- List of Japanese films of 1964
