= List of Georgian films of the 1960s =

A list of the films produced in the cinema of Georgia in the 1960s, ordered by year of release:

Title	Director	Cast	Genre	Studio/notes
1960
1961
April	Otar Iosseliani			Screened at the 2000 Cannes Film Festival
1962
1963
1964
Father of a Soldier	Rezo Chkheidze			Entered into the 4th Moscow International Film Festival
1965
1966
Giorgobistve	Otar Iosseliani			
1967
1968
The Plea (a.k.a. The Supplication)	Tengiz Abuladze			
1969
