= A Trip to the Moon (Chronicle) =

- Chronicle episode
- Newspaper advertisement for the film
- Teleplay by: Jonathan Miller; Bo Goldman * Robert Goldman
- Based on: From the Earth to the Moon by Jules Verne
- Narrated by: Charles Collingwood
- Original air date: February 12, 1964
- Running time: 60 minutes

Guest appearances
- Alan Bennett; Peter Cook; Jonathan Miller; Dudley Moore

"A Trip to the Moon" is a 1964 television science fiction comedy film, produced as an episode of the CBS series Chronicle. The script was written by Jonathan Miller and Robert Goldman, based on Jules Verne's 1865 novel From the Earth to the Moon. All characters are portrayed by Alan Bennett, Peter Cook, Miller, and Dudley Moore, who had first worked together in the revue Beyond the Fringe.

The hour-long show adapts the plot of Verne's novel to comment satirically on the Moon race then underway between the United States and the Soviet Union, juxtaposing Victorian ideas and aesthetics with contemporary themes of space travel. It received mixed reviews, and Miller later dismissed it as a failure.

== Plot ==
In 1865, six months after the Battle of Appomattox, the "artillery intellectuals" at the Baltimore Gun Club are bored and eager for a new project. They decide to send a rocket to the Moon. After building the largest gun in the world to fire off the rocket, members of the Club set off inside the capsule, furnished in plush Victorian taste and stocked with fine wines.

== Production ==
Miller, following his success in the revue Beyond the Fringe, was hired as a film and television journalist for The New Yorker. Criticizing the programming he saw as "shuddering fluorescent jelly", and inspired by Newton Minow's famous "Wasteland Speech" in 1961, Miller decided to move from reviewing into television production, hoping to provide innovative and intellectual content for the medium. Because the United States and the Soviet Union were vying to achieve a Moon landing, Miller conceived the idea of a satire based on Jules Verne's From the Earth to the Moon, as he explained to The New York Times:

It is a stylized comedy. We've gone off the track and into an insane area. I read the Verne novel about the time of the moon shot and was impressed by the strong contrast of moon travel and Victorian travel. ... Our space capsule looks like a Pullman car. And there we are—toasting each other in velvet smoking jackets.

The film was produced for Chronicle, a CBS documentary series that aired alternately with the CBS Reports. Chronicle, broadcast on Wednesday nights from October 1963 through April 1964 and hosted by Charles Collingwood, focused on modern culture and its historical origins, as a counterpoint to the "hard news" slant the CBS Reports emphasized. Other episodes in the series were devoted to topics such as Edgar Allan Poe, the Constitution of the United States, and the British music hall tradition. The series was nominated for "Outstanding Program Achievement in the Field of News Commentary or Public Affairs" at the 16th Primetime Emmy Awards in 1964.

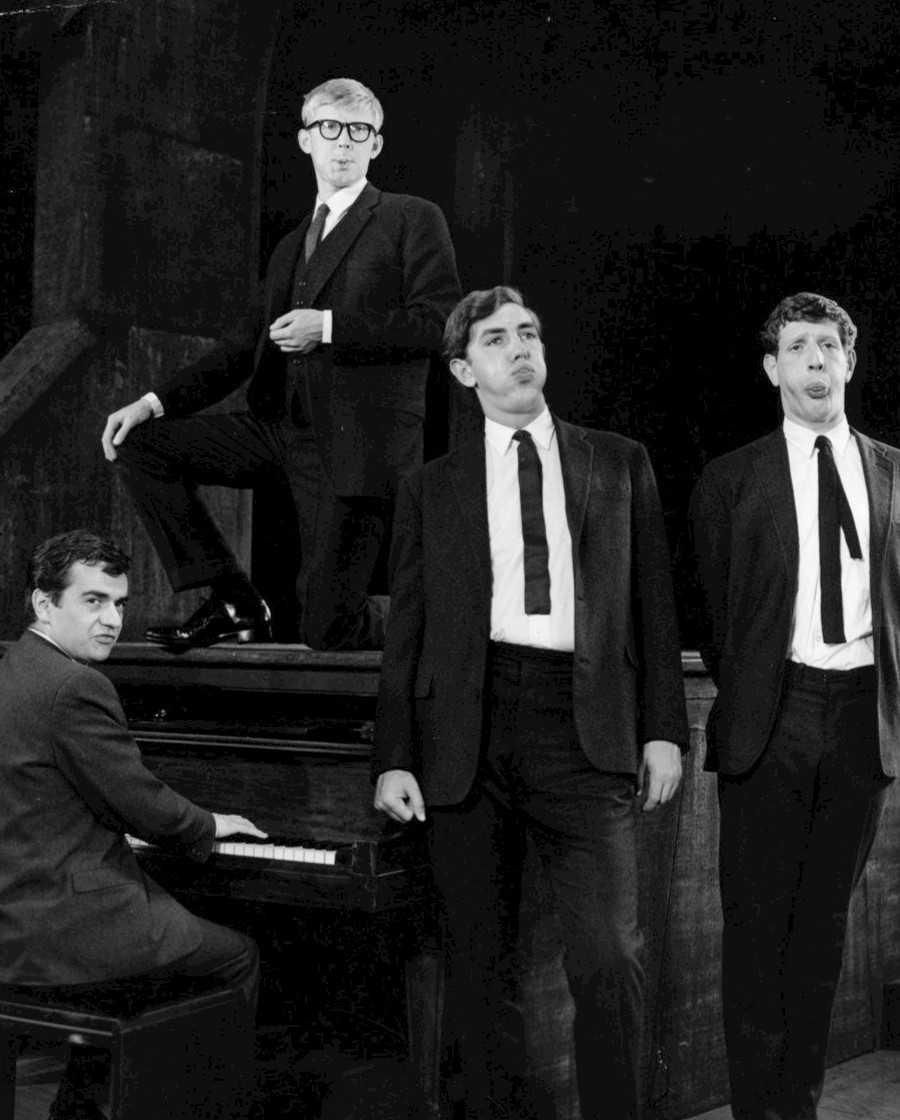
Moore, Bennett, Cook, and Miller had previously appeared together in Beyond the Fringe (pictured)

Miller co-wrote the script with Goldman, who also produced the show. Miller reunited the original cast of Beyond the Fringe—Bennett, Cook, Moore, and himself—to play all the characters in the show, each actor taking on several roles. Between the taped scenes with the actors, the show features montage sequences by the animator Fred Mogubgub, edited from silent film clips, animation, and still images. One such montage covers the entire American Civil War in a single minute. Robert Prince contributed the music score.

== Reception ==
The St. Petersburg Times described the show as "delicious satire", singling out Mogubgub's contributions, Prince's score, and Verne's prophetic themes for special praise. The syndicated TV Key column called the show "the kind of frolic you'd expect from one of the authors of Beyond the Fringe ... Human beings are alternately lampooned and applauded for the faulty but imaginative creatures they are." However, The New York Times panned it, calling it "a weird and stilted mélange" and commenting: "The difficulty for the players ... was that Mr. Verne's imagination was infinitely more interesting than their labored attempts to make light of it." Miller later described the show as "just boring and no bloody good".
