= Miwa Takada =

Japanese film, TV and stage actress (born 1947)

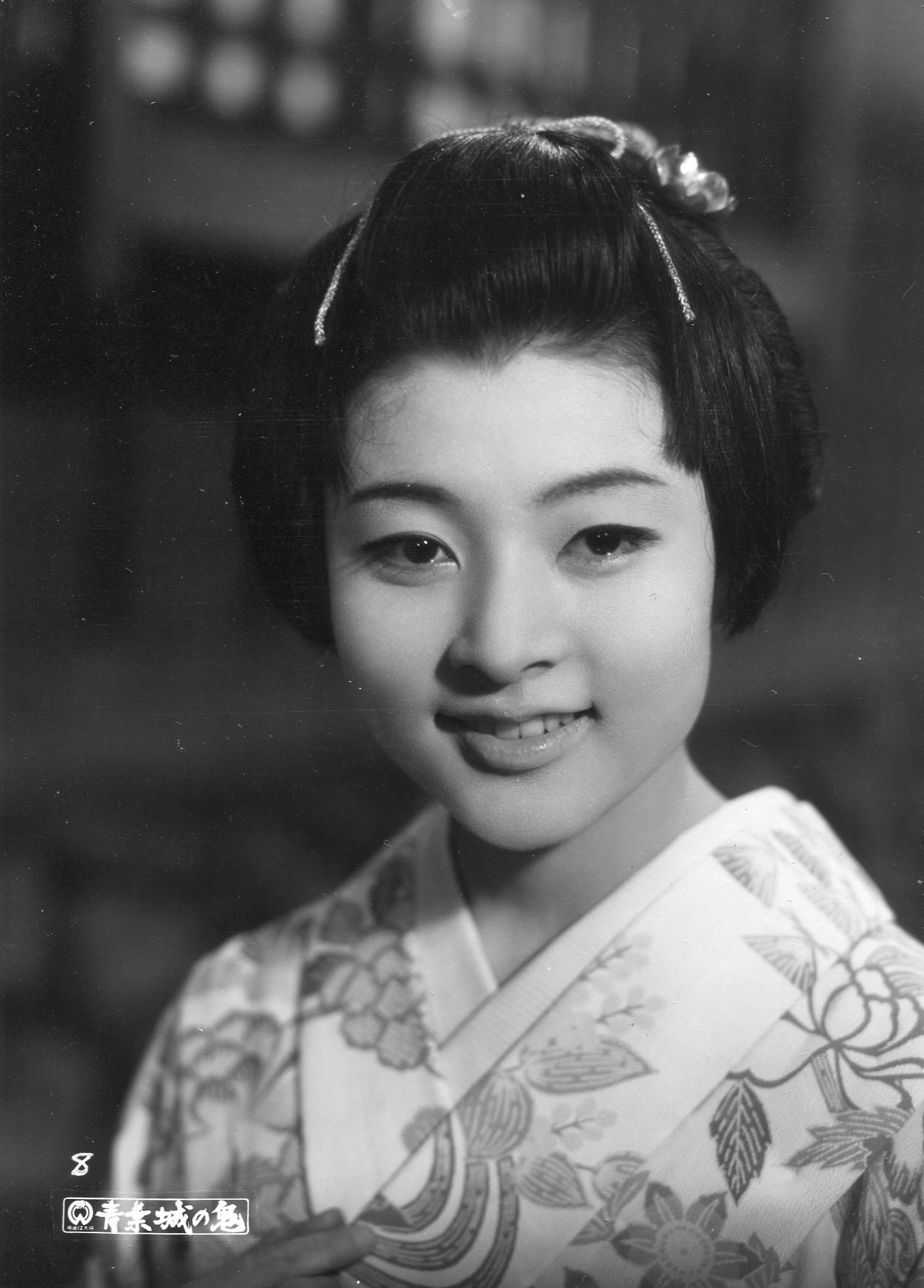
- Born: 5 January 1947 (age 78); Kyoto
- Occupation: Actress

Miwa Takada (高田 美和, Takada Miwa, born 5 January 1947 in Kyoto) is a Japanese film, TV and stage actress. She has starred in several Japanese movies that are today considered classics (especially in the Zatoichi saga, and the Daimajin trilogy).

Takada also worked as a singer, and the duet she recorded with Mitsuo Kaji, "Waga Ai wo Hoshi ni Inorite," became a huge hit. Now she focuses on stage performances and TV. She lives in Numazu.

== Filmography ==
Takada'a filmography as an actress includes the following.

Year	Title	Japanese	Romanization	Character
1962	Fencing Master		Tateshi Danpei	Okiku
1963			Nyokei Kazoku	Hinako Yajima
1963	Zatoichi the Fugitive	座頭市兇状旅	Zatoichi Kyojo Tabi	Nobu
1964	Sleepy Eyes of Death: Sword of Adventure		Nemuri Kyoshiro 2: Shōbu	
1964			Kino Kieta Otoko	Osono
1964			Kojiki Taisho	
1964	Adventures of Zatoichi		Zatoichi Sekisho Yaburi	Saki
1964			Kōdōkan no Washi	
1964			Dokonjō Monogatari: Zuputo Iyatsu	
1965			Mamiana-chō Zero-banchi	
1965			Mesuinu dassô	Yuki Koide
1966			Daimajin	Kozasa Hanabusa
1967			Rikugun Nakano Gakkō: Mitsumei	
1967	Zatoichi Challenged		Zatoichi Chikemuri Kaido	Omitsu
1968	Sleepy Eyes of Death: Hell Is a Woman		Nemuri Kyoshiro 10: Onna Jigoku	Princess Saya
1968	100 Monsters		Yōkai Hyaku Monogatari	Okiku
1968			Nihiki no Yojimbo	Oshodomo
1972	Rudolph the Red-Nosed Reindeer			Rudolph (1972 Nippon Television Dub)
1982			Karuizawa Fujin	Keiko Nakagawa
1991	Journey of Honor		Kabuto	Yodogimi
