= Adventures of Zatoichi =

1964 film

- Directed by: Kimiyoshi Yasuda
- Written by: Shozaburo Asai; Kan Shimozawa (story)
- Produced by: Shozaburo Asai
- Starring: Shintaro Katsu; Eiko Taki; Miwa Takada
- Cinematography: Shōzō Honda
- Music by: Taichirō Kosugi
- Production company: Daiei Studios
- Release date: 30 December 1964 (Japan)
- Running time: 86 minutes
- Country: Japan
- Language: Japanese

Adventures of Zatoichi (座頭市関所破り, Zatōichi sekisho-yaburi) is a 1964 Japanese chambara film directed by Kimiyoshi Yasuda and starring Shintaro Katsu as the blind masseur Zatoichi. It was written by Shozaburo Asai from a story by Kan Shimozawa. It was originally released by the Daiei Motion Picture Company (later acquired by Kadokawa Pictures).

Adventures of Zatoichi is the ninth episode in the 26-part film series devoted to the character of Zatoichi.

== Plot ==
Outside of town, a man asks Ichi to give a letter to a maid called Sen at Musashi Inn. Ichi does this and there shares a room with a young woman called Saki. Saki is looking for her father, the headman of a nearby village disappeared while protesting against the harshness of new government intendant Gorota Kajime.

With the support of the new intendant, local crime boss Jinbei demands an extortionate 40% of the takings of all the town vendors who have come to town. Worried that a man called Shinsuke has escaped, the boss's henchmen plan to take his sister Sen to Jinbei but Ichi intervenes.

At night Ichi overhears a meeting between Sen and the man who gave Ichi the letter: Shinsuke. To cover up the crimes of Jinbei and the intendant, Shinsuke was told to kill a man but Shinsuke was double-crossed and sent to jail. He plans to kill Jinbei.

Ichi goes to Jinbei's gambling house and again (like the last film) spectacularly cuts weighted dice in two and retrieves the genuine, fair dice from their hiding location in the thrower's top-knot. Ichi is taken to a back room where the boss and the intendant are playing go. A skilled retainer, Gounosuke, acting as the intendant's bodyguard tests Ichi in an impromptu iaijutsu display. The end of Ichi's sword-cane handle is cut off and Ichi asks to be excused. After he leaves the go table, a foot thick block of solid wood, falls in half.

Tired of waiting for her companion Gosuke, Saki decides to travel to Shimokawa and is abducted by Jinbei's men. Ichi followed her and his reputation prompts the men to release her. Ichi and Saki return to the inn where Gounosuke is waiting and demands a rematch. Ichi declines but Gounosuke insists until Ichi cuts in mid air a spinning top thrown at Gounosuke; the top remains spinning after it hits the ground then splits in two. Gounosuke accepts an invitation to drink. Gonosuke says as the third son of a minor lord he couldn't expect much more than his lowly job. All he wants is to meet someone who can beat him in a duel. Ichi just wants to celebrate by worshipping the new year's sun on Mount Myogi but Gounosuke insists on a duel.

Walking about town Ichi meets the town drunk. Over sake the old man relates how he had a son who would be about Ichi's age but that he lost him nearly 30 years ago as a young boy while worshipping the new year's sun on Mount Myogi. The old man gives his name as Giju and Ichi looks surprised and later says to himself that, despite the similarities between his childhood and Giju's story, Giju couldn't be the right name.

At night Ichi accompanies Sen to see Shinsuke. Ichi calls Shinsuke a fool for treating his sister so badly. Jinbei's men followed Ichi who fights them. Shinsuke nearly escapes but is mortally stabbed, as he dies he confesses to Sen that he killed the headman.

Just after her companion returns, Ichi tells Saki of her father's death and that she should go home as Jinbei plans to kill her. He hires Giju to guide her around checkpoints to escape but Giju is paid by Jinbei and betrays her.

Two young boys tell Ichi Giju betrayed Saki. Ichi confront Giju but spares him because Giju reminds him of his own father. As he leaves Ichi is attacked by six swordsmen. Sensing their attack he kills five and the sixth throws himself to the ground to avoid being attacked.

Ichi goes to the guardhouse, frees Saki then duels Gounosuke as a gentle snow falls. He fights dozens of guards and kills many as well as Jinbei and the intendant. At dawn he worships the new year's first sun light before walking off alone.

== Cast ==
- Shintaro Katsu as Zatoichi
- Eiko Taki as Osen
- Miwa Takada as Saki
- Mikijiro Hira as Gounosuke
- Kichijiro Ueda as Boss Jinbei
- Akitake Kono as Gorota Kajima
- Koichi Mizuhara as Kamazo
- Ikuko Mori as Hanokama

== Reception ==
=== Critical response ===
Adventures of Zatoichi currently has three positive reviews, and no negative reviews at Rotten Tomatoes.
