= List of Mauritanian films =

A chronological list of films produced in Mauritania is presented below:

== 1960s ==
- Soleil Ô (1969)

== 1970s ==
- Les Bicots-negres vos voisins (1974), a.k.a. Arabs and Niggers, Your Neighbours
- Nationalité immigré (1975)
- Sahel la faim pourquoi (1975)
- Faisons ensemble la patrie mauritanienne (1976)
- Nous aurons toute la mort pour dormir (1977)
- Safrana ou le droit à la parole (1978)
- West Indies (1979)

== 1980s ==
- Sarraounia (1986)

== 1990s ==
- Oktyabr (1993)
- Rostov-Luanda (1998)
- La Vie Sur Terre (1998)
- Watani, un monde sans mal (1998)

== 2000s ==
- Waiting for Happiness (Heremakono) (2002)
- En attendant les hommes (2007)

== 2010s ==
- Timbuktu (2014)
