= 1967 in film =

The year 1967 in film involved some significant events. It was the year in which Charlie Chaplin made his last film, A Countess from Hong Kong, which he wrote, directed and produced, and in which he played a cameo role; it was the only one of his films to be made in colour. He also wrote the score, including an instrumental version of "This Is My Song", a major hit worldwide. The Walt Disney Studios released The Jungle Book, the final animated feature film to be produced by Walt Disney himself, who died before it reached cinemas. Spanish filmmaker Luis Buñuel released Belle de Jour, starring Catherine Deneuve, a multinational production that would turn out to be one of Buñuel's most successful films. 1967 is also widely considered one of the most ground-breaking years in American cinema, with "revolutionary" films highlighting the shift towards forward-thinking European standards at the time, including: Bonnie and Clyde, The Graduate, Guess Who's Coming to Dinner, Cool Hand Luke, The Dirty Dozen, In Cold Blood, In the Heat of the Night, and You Only Live Twice.

== Highest-grossing films ==
=== North America ===
The top ten 1967 released films by box office gross in North America are as follows:

Highest-grossing films of 1967
Rank	Title	Distributor	Domestic rentals
1	The Graduate	United Artists / Embassy	$43,100,000
2	Guess Who's Coming to Dinner	Columbia	$25,500,000
3	Bonnie and Clyde	Warner Bros.	$22,000,000
4	The Dirty Dozen	MGM	$20,100,000
5	Valley of the Dolls	20th Century Fox	$20,000,000
6	To Sir, with Love	Columbia	$19,100,000
7	You Only Live Twice	United Artists / Eon	$18,000,000
8	Thoroughly Modern Millie	Universal	$14,700,000
9	The Jungle Book	Buena Vista	$13,000,000
10	Camelot	Warner Bros.	$12,300,000

== Events ==
- April 28 — The prototype for the IMAX large-format-film acquisition and screening system is exhibited at Expo 67 in Montreal, Quebec, Canada.
- July 8 — Vivien Leigh, best known for starring in Gone with the Wind and A Streetcar Named Desire, dies from tuberculosis in London.
- July 15 — Seven Arts Productions acquire substantially all the assets and business of Warner Bros. creating Warner Bros.-Seven Arts.
- August 13 — Bonnie and Clyde, starring Warren Beatty, Faye Dunaway and Gene Hackman, premieres. It breaks many taboos of its time, such as the visual depiction of violence. It will be considered a landmark film in Hollywood filmmaking, with its groundbreaking and ingenious visual styles. The success of Bonnie and Clyde helps bring forth the New Hollywood era, a period of artistic and commercial renewal.
- October 18 — Walt Disney's production of Rudyard Kipling's The Jungle Book premieres. It is the last animated feature film to be personally supervised by Disney before his death the previous year. It is also one of the last Disney films to be personally approved by him, along with The Happiest Millionaire and Winnie the Pooh and the Blustery Day. The story's moral message of friendship, love and trust will be embraced by critics and audiences worldwide. The Jungle Book is notable for its realistic character animation and voice casting. The film's soundtrack (scored by George Bruns), which includes the Academy Award-nominated song "The Bare Necessities", also contributes to the film's enormous success. It will be the most successful animated film to be made by Disney until The Rescuers, ten years later.
- December 21 — The Graduate, starring Dustin Hoffman (in his acting film debut), Anne Bancroft and Katharine Ross, premieres. It tells a story of an aimless young man, seduced and betrayed by an older woman, while falling in love with her daughter. The theme of an innocent and confused youth who is exploited, misdirected, seduced (literally and figuratively) and betrayed by a corrupt, decadent and discredited older generation (that finds its stability in the film's keyword "plastics") is well understood by film audiences and captures the spirit of the times, in light of the assassination of U.S. President John F. Kennedy in 1963 and the increasing turbulence in American society in the mid-to-late 1960s. Like Bonnie and Clyde, The Graduate breaks many well-established taboos in American cinema and represents a new era in groundbreaking achievements in filmmaking.
- The MPAA adopts a new logo, which is used until 2019.

== Awards ==
Category/Organization	25th Golden Globe Awards February 12, 1968		40th Academy Awards April 10, 1968
Category/Organization	Drama	Musical or Comedy	40th Academy Awards April 10, 1968
Best Film	In the Heat of the Night	The Graduate	In the Heat of the Night
Best Director	Mike Nichols; The Graduate		
Best Actor	Rod Steiger; In the Heat of the Night	Richard Harris; Camelot	Rod Steiger; In the Heat of the Night
Best Actress	Edith Evans; The Whisperers	Anne Bancroft; The Graduate	Katharine Hepburn; Guess Who's Coming to Dinner
Best Supporting Actor	Richard Attenborough; Doctor Dolittle		George Kennedy; Cool Hand Luke
Best Supporting Actress	Carol Channing; Thoroughly Modern Millie		Estelle Parsons; Bonnie and Clyde
Best Screenplay, Adapted	Stirling Silliphant; In the Heat of the Night		Stirling Silliphant; In the Heat of the Night
Best Screenplay, Original	Stirling Silliphant; In the Heat of the Night		William Rose; Guess Who's Coming to Dinner
Best Original Score	Frederick Loewe; Camelot		Alfred Newman and Ken Darby; Camelot; Elmer Bernstein; Thoroughly Modern Millie
Best Original Song	"If Ever I Would Leave You"; Camelot		"Talk to the Animals"; Doctor Dolittle
Best Foreign Language Film	Live for Life		Closely Watched Trains

Palme d'Or (Cannes Film Festival):

Blowup, directed by Michelangelo Antonioni, Italy

Golden Lion (Venice Film Festival):

Belle de jour, directed by Luis Buñuel, France / Italy

Golden Bear (Berlin Film Festival):

Le départ, directed by Jerzy Skolimowski, Belgium

== 1967 film releases ==
US unless stated

=== January–March ===
- January 1967
  - 5 January
    - A Countess from Hong Kong (U.K.)
  - 18 January
    - The Born Losers
    - Come Spy with Me
    - The Venetian Affair
    - Warning Shot
  - 19 January
    - Hotel
  - 25 January
    - First to Fight
  - 26 January
    - The Deadly Affair (U.K.)
  - 27 January
    - Hot Rods to Hell
- February 1967
  - 1 February
    - The Ballad of Josie
  - 3 February
    - The Corrupt Ones (West Germany)/(Italy)/ (France)
  - 7 February
    - Tobruk
  - 8 February
    - Monkeys, Go Home!
  - 9 February
    - Accident (U.K.)
    - Hurry Sundown
  - 10 February
    - The Night of the Generals (U.K.)/ (France)
  - 12 February
    - Deadlier Than the Male (U.K.)
  - 15 February
    - A Covenant with Death
    - Oh Dad, Poor Dad, Mamma's Hung You in the Closet and I'm Feelin' So Sad
  - 18 February
    - Good Morning and... Goodbye!
  - 22 February
    - Marat/Sade (U.K.)
  - 25 February
    - Enter Laughing
  - 28 February
    - Privilege (U.K.)
- March 1967
  - 1 March
    - The Happening
  - 8 March
    - The Adventures of Bullwhip Griffin
    - Mad Monster Party?
    - The Taming of the Shrew (Italy/U.S.)
    - The Young Girls of Rochefort (France)
  - 9 March
    - How to Succeed in Business Without Really Trying
  - 12 March
    - The Busy Body
  - 13 March
    - The House of 1,000 Dolls
  - 14 March
    - Ulysses
  - 15 March
    - Frankenstein Created Woman (U.K.)
    - In Like Flint
    - Gamera vs. Gyaos (Japan)
  - 18 March
    - Riot on Sunset Strip
  - 21 March
    - Hombre
    - Thoroughly Modern Millie
  - 22 March
    - Easy Come, Easy Go
    - Thunder Alley
  - 25 March
    - The X from Outer Space (Japan)
  - 26 March
    - The Desperate Ones
  - 31 March
    - The Champagne Murders

=== April–June ===
- April 1967
  - 1 April
    - Kidnapping, Caucasian Style (U.S.S.R)
  - 12 April
    - The Cool Ones
  - 13 April
    - Casino Royale (U.K./U.S.)
  - 14 April
    - It's a Bikini World
  - 18 April
    - Caprice
  - 22 April
    - Gappa: The Triphibian Monster (Japan)
  - 24 April
    - A Stranger in Town (Italy/U.S.)
  - 28 April
    - Devil's Angels
    - Doctor, You've Got to Be Kidding!
  - 29 April
    - Eight on the Lam
- May 1967
  - 1 May
    - 40 Guns to Apache Pass
    - They Came from Beyond Space (U.K.)
    - Welcome to Hard Times
  - 3 May
    - Bikini Paradise
    - The Vulture (U.K.)
  - 12 May
    - Good Times
  - 15 May
    - The Jokers (U.K.)
  - 17 May
    - Don't Look Back
    - The Million Eyes of Sumuru (U.K.)
  - 22 May
    - The Honey Pot
  - 24 May
    - Belle de Jour (France)
    - The Caper of the Golden Bulls
    - Double Trouble
    - Three Bites of the Apple
    - The Way West
  - 25 May
    - Barefoot in the Park
    - A Guide for the Married Man
    - The Vengeance of Fu Manchu (U.K.)
  - 26 May
    - Catalina Caper
  - 27 May
    - Samurai Rebellion (Japan)
    - The War Wagon
- June 1967
  - 9 June
    - Don't Make Waves
  - 11 June
    - Snow White and the Seven Dwarfs (re-release)
  - 13 June
    - You Only Live Twice (U.K./U.S.)
  - 14 June
    - To Sir, with Love
  - 15 June
    - Branded to Kill (Japan)
    - The Dirty Dozen
  - 16 June
    - The Reluctant Astronaut
  - 18 June
    - The Mummy's Shroud
  - 21 June
    - Divorce American Style
  - 23 June
    - The Happiest Millionaire
  - 27 June
    - The Shuttered Room (U.K.)
    - Woman Times Seven
  - 28 June
    - Gunn
  - 30 June
    - The St. Valentine's Day Massacre

=== July–September ===
- July 1967
  - 6 July
    - The Sorcerers
  - 12 July
    - The Big Mouth
    - Common Law Cabin
    - The Gnome-Mobile
  - 13 July
    - Jules Verne's Rocket to the Moon (U.K.)
  - 19 July
    - The Naked Runner
    - Up the Down Staircase
  - 21 July
    - War and Peace Part III (U.S.S.R)
  - 22 July
    - King Kong Escapes (Japan)
  - 23 July
    - Chuka
  - 26 July
    - The Love-Ins
    - Luv
  - 27 July
    - The Long Duel
- August 1967
  - 1 August
    - Rough Night in Jericho
  - 2 August
    - In the Heat of the Night
    - The Perils of Pauline
  - 3 August
    - Beach Red
  - 12 August
    - Japan's Longest Day (Japan)
  - 13 August
    - Bonnie and Clyde
    - Yongary, Monster from the Deep (South Korea)
  - 18 August
    - The Tiger Makes Out
  - 22 August
    - The Flim-Flam Man
  - 23 August
    - The Thief of Paris (France)
    - The Whisperers (U.K.)
  - 30 August
    - Point Blank
  - 31 August
    - The Trip
- September 1967
  - 1 September
    - The Fastest Guitar Alive
    - Tarzan and the Great River
  - 8 September
    - Fort Utah
  - 14 September
    - Our Mother's House (U.K.)
  - 17 September
    - Games
  - 20 September
    - Two for the Road
  - 22 September
    - Robbery
  - 26 September
    - Who's Minding the Mint?
  - 28 September
    - The Bobo

=== October–December ===
- October 1967
  - 1 October
    - Fathom (U.K.)
  - 3 October
    - Titicut Follies
  - 9 October
    - I Am Curious (Sweden)
  - 13 October
    - Reflections in a Golden Eye
  - 16 October
    - Far from the Madding Crowd (U.K.)
    - Hamraaz (India)
  - 18 October
    - Charlie, the Lonesome Cougar
    - Clambake
    - The Jungle Book
  - 19 October
    - Doctor Faustus
  - 23 October
    - How I Won the War (U.K.)
  - 25 October
    - Camelot
  - 26 October
    - Wait Until Dark
  - 31 October
    - The Comedians
- November 1967
  - 1 November
    - Cool Hand Luke
    - Hour of the Gun
    - A Time for Killing
  - 4 November
    - War and Peace Part IV (U.S.S.R)
  - 5 November
    - The Incident
  - 9 November
    - Custer of the West
    - Quatermass and the Pit (U.K.)
  - 10 November
    - Berserk!
    - Jack of Diamonds
    - Tony Rome
  - 13 November
    - The Fearless Vampire Killers
  - 15 November
    - Gentle Giant
    - Who's That Knocking at My Door
  - 22 November
    - The Producers
    - Rosie!
- December 1967
  - 1 December
    - Hells Angels on Wheels
  - 5 December
    - Festival
    - Poor Cow (U.K.)
  - 6 December
    - Kill a Dragon
  - 10 December
    - Bedazzled (U.K.)
  - 12 December
    - Guess Who's Coming to Dinner
  - 13 December
    - The Fox
  - 14 December
    - Follow That Camel
    - In Cold Blood
  - 15 December
    - Carry On Doctor (U.K.)
    - Valley of the Dolls
  - 16 December
    - Playtime (France/Italy)
    - Son of Godzilla (Japan)
  - 17 December
    - Banning
  - 18 December
    - I'll Never Forget What's'isname (U.K.)
  - 19 December
    - Doctor Dolittle
  - 20 December
    - Billion Dollar Brain (U.K.)/(U.S)
    - Fitzwilly
  - 21 December
    - The Graduate
    - The President's Analyst
  - 22 December
    - The Ambusheers
  - 26 December
    - Magical Mystery Tour (U.K.)
  - 27 December
    - The Last Challenge
    - Smashing Time (U.K.)
  - 29 December
    - Weekend (France)

== Notable films released in 1967 ==
U.S. unless stated

=== # ===
- 40 Guns to Apache Pass, starring Audie Murphy
- Two or Three Things I Know About Her (2 ou 3 choses que je sais d'elle), directed by Jean-Luc Godard – (France)
- The 25th Hour, starring Anthony Quinn and Virna Lisi – (France/Italy/Romania)

=== A ===
- Accident, directed by Joseph Losey, starring Dirk Bogarde and Stanley Baker – (U.K.)
- The Adventures of Bullwhip Griffin, starring Roddy McDowall, Suzanne Pleshette, and Karl Malden
- The Ambushers, starring Dean Martin (as Matt Helm)
- The Andromeda Nebula – (USSR)
- Anna Karenina – (USSR)

=== B ===
- The Ballad of Josie, starring Doris Day
- Banning, starring Robert Wagner, Jill St. John, Susan Clark, Gene Hackman
- Barefoot in the Park, starring Robert Redford and Jane Fonda
- Battle Beneath the Earth, starring Kerwin Mathews and Peter Arne – (U.K.)
- Beach Red, starring Cornel Wilde and Rip Torn
- Bedazzled, directed by Stanley Donen, starring Peter Cook, Dudley Moore, Raquel Welch – (U.K.)
- Belle de jour, directed by Luis Buñuel, starring Catherine Deneuve – winner of Golden Lion – (France)
- Berserk!, starring Joan Crawford – (U.K.)
- Bewitched Love (El amor brujo) – (Spain)
- The Big Mouth, directed by and starring Jerry Lewis
- Billion Dollar Brain, directed by Ken Russell, starring Michael Caine – (U.K.)
- The Birch Tree (Breza), directed by Ante Babaja – (Yugoslavia)
- The Blood Demon (Die Schlangengrube und das Pendel, a.k.a. The Torture Chamber of Dr. Sadism), directed by Harald Reinl – (West Germany)
- The Bobo, starring Peter Sellers, Britt Ekland, Adolfo Celi, Rossano Brazzi, Al Lettieri – (U.K.)
- Bonnie and Clyde, directed by Arthur Penn, starring Warren Beatty, Faye Dunaway, Gene Hackman, Estelle Parsons, Michael J. Pollard
- Born Losers, directed by and starring Tom Laughlin
- Branded to Kill (Koroshi no rakuin), directed by Seijun Suzuki – (Japan)
- The Busy Body, starring Sid Caesar, Robert Ryan, Jan Murray, Arlene Golonka, Richard Pryor

=== C ===
- Camelot, a musical directed by Joshua Logan, starring Richard Harris, Vanessa Redgrave, Franco Nero, with songs by Lerner and Loewe
- The Cape Town Affair, starring James Brolin and Jacqueline Bisset
- Caprice, starring Doris Day and Richard Harris
- Carry On Doctor, starring Frankie Howerd and Sid James – (U.K.)
- Case of the Naves Brothers (O Caso dos Irmãos Naves) – (Brazil)
- Casino Royale, starring David Niven, Peter Sellers, Ursula Andress, Woody Allen, Daliah Lavi, Barbara Bouchet – (U.K.)
- Catalina Caper, starring Tommy Kirk
- Cervantes, starring Horst Buchholz and Gina Lollobrigida – (Spain/France/Italy)
- The Champagne Murders (Le scandale), directed by Claude Chabrol and starring Anthony Perkins – (France)
- Charlie Bubbles, directed by and starring Albert Finney with Billie Whitelaw and Liza Minnelli – (U.K.)
- China Is Near (La Cina è vicina) – (Italy)
- La Chinoise, directed by Jean-Luc Godard – (France)
- Chuka, starring Rod Taylor, Ernest Borgnine, John Mills
- Clambake, starring Elvis Presley and Shelley Fabares
- The Collector (La collectionneuse), directed by Éric Rohmer – (France)
- The College Girl Murders (Der Mönch mit der Peitsche, a.k.a. The Monk with the Whip), directed by Alfred Vohrer – (West Germany)
- A Colt Is My Passport (Koruto wa ore no pasupoto), starring Joe Shishido – (Japan)
- Come Spy with Me, starring Troy Donahue
- The Comedians, starring Richard Burton, Elizabeth Taylor, Alec Guinness
- Commissar – (USSR)
- Cool Hand Luke, directed by Stuart Rosenberg, starring Paul Newman and George Kennedy
- Counterpoint, starring Charlton Heston
- A Countess from Hong Kong, directed by Charlie Chaplin, starring Marlon Brando and Sophia Loren – (U.K.)
- Custer of the West, starring Robert Shaw, Mary Ure and Robert Ryan

=== D ===
- Day of Anger (I giorni dell'ira), starring Lee Van Cleef – (Italy)
- A Degree of Murder (Mord und Totschlag), directed by Volker Schlöndorff, starring Anita Pallenberg – (West Germany)
- The Departure (Le départ), directed by Jerzy Skolimowski, starring Jean-Pierre Léaud – (Belgium)
- Deadlier Than the Male, starring Richard Johnson and Elke Sommer – (U.K.)
- The Deadly Affair, directed by Sidney Lumet, starring James Mason and Simone Signoret – (U.K.)
- Death Rides a Horse (Da uomo a uomo), starring Lee Van Cleef and John Phillip Law – (Italy)
- Diabolically Yours (Diaboliquement vôtre), starring Alain Delon and Senta Berger – (France/Italy/West Germany)
- The Dirty Dozen, directed by Robert Aldrich, starring Lee Marvin and an ensemble cast
- Divorce American Style, starring Dick Van Dyke, Debbie Reynolds, Jason Robards, Jean Simmons
- Doctor Dolittle, a musical directed by Richard Fleischer, starring Rex Harrison, Samantha Eggar, Anthony Newley
- Doctor Faustus, directed by Richard Burton and Nevill Coghill – (U.K.)
- Doctor, You've Got to Be Kidding!, starring Sandra Dee and George Hamilton
- Dont Look Back, a documentary by D. A. Pennebaker, featuring Bob Dylan
- Don't Make Waves, starring Tony Curtis, Claudia Cardinale, Sharon Tate
- Double Trouble, starring Elvis Presley
- Dragon Gate Inn (Lóng mén kè zhàn) (international release), directed by King Hu – (Taiwan)

=== E ===
- Easy Come, Easy Go, starring Elvis Presley
- Eight on the Lam, starring Bob Hope, Jonathan Winters, Shirley Eaton, Jill St. John
- Elvira Madigan, directed by Bo Widerberg – (Sweden)
- Entranced Earth (Terra em Transe), directed by Glauber Rocha – (Brazil)
- An Evening in Paris, starring Shammi Kapoor – (India)
- The Exchange Student (Les grandes vacances), directed by Jean Girault – (France/Italy)

=== F ===
- Faccia a faccia (Face to Face), starring Gian Maria Volonté – (Italy)
- Far from the Madding Crowd, directed by John Schlesinger, starring Julie Christie, Terence Stamp, Peter Finch, Alan Bates – (U.K.)
- The Fastest Guitar Alive, starring Roy Orbison
- Fathom, starring Raquel Welch – (U.K.)
- The Fearless Vampire Killers, directed by Roman Polanski, starring Sharon Tate – (U.K./U.S.)
- Festival, a documentary about Newport Folk Festival
- The Firemen's Ball (Hoří, má panenko), directed by Miloš Forman – (Czechoslovakia)
- Fitzwilly, starring Dick Van Dyke and Barbara Feldon
- The Flim-Flam Man, starring George C. Scott, Michael Sarrazin
- Follow That Camel (a.k.a. Carry On...Follow That Camel), starring Phil Silvers and Kenneth Williams – (U.K.)
- Fort Utah, starring John Ireland and Virginia Mayo
- The Fox, starring Sandy Dennis, Anne Heywood, Keir Dullea
- Frankenstein Created Woman, starring Peter Cushing – (U.K.)
- The Frozen Dead, starring Dana Andrews, Anna Palk

=== G ===
- Games, starring Simone Signoret, Katharine Ross and James Caan
- The Good, the Bad and the Ugly, directed by Sergio Leone, starring Clint Eastwood, Lee Van Cleef and Eli Wallach – (Italy)
- Good Times, starring Sonny & Cher
- The Graduate, directed by Mike Nichols, starring Dustin Hoffman, Anne Bancroft and Katharine Ross
- Grand Slam, starring Janet Leigh and Edward G. Robinson – (Italy/Spain/West Germany)
- Guess Who's Coming to Dinner, directed by Stanley Kramer, starring Spencer Tracy, Katharine Hepburn and Sidney Poitier
- A Guide for the Married Man, directed by Gene Kelly, starring Walter Matthau, Inger Stevens and Robert Morse
- Gunfight in Abilene, starring Bobby Darin
- Gunn, starring Craig Stevens

=== H ===
- Half a Sixpence, starring Tommy Steele – (U.K.)
- Hatey Bazarey (The Market Place), starring Ashok Kumar and Vyjayanthimala – (India)
- Hamraaz, starring Sunil Dutt and Raaj Kumar – (India)
- The Happening, starring Anthony Quinn, Michael Parks, Faye Dunaway
- The Happiest Millionaire, starring Fred MacMurray, Greer Garson, Tommy Steele, Lesley Ann Warren, John Davidson
- The Heathens of Kummerow (Die Heiden von Kummerow und ihre lustigen Streiche), the first co-production between East Germany and West Germany
- Hell on Wheels, starring Marty Robbins
- Hells Angels on Wheels, starring Jack Nicholson
- Herostratus, directed by Don Levy – (Australia/U.K.)
- Hombre, directed by Martin Ritt, starring Paul Newman, Fredric March, Diane Cilento, Richard Boone, Martin Balsam, Barbara Rush
- The Honey Pot, starring Rex Harrison, Cliff Robertson, Susan Hayward, Edie Adams
- Hotel, directed by Richard Quine, starring Rod Taylor, Melvyn Douglas, Karl Malden, Catherine Spaak, Merle Oberon
- Hour of the Gun, directed by John Sturges, starring James Garner, Jason Robards, Robert Ryan
- The House of 1,000 Dolls, starring Vincent Price – (Spain/West Germany)
- How I Won The War, directed by Richard Lester, starring Michael Crawford, John Lennon Michael Hordern – (U.K.)
- How to Succeed in Business Without Really Trying, starring Robert Morse, Michele Lee, Rudy Vallée, Maureen Arthur
- Hurry Sundown, directed by Otto Preminger, starring Jane Fonda, Michael Caine, Diahann Carroll, Beah Richards, Faye Dunaway

=== I ===
- I, a Man, directed by Andy Warhol
- I Am Curious (Yellow) (Jag är nyfiken – en film i gult) – (Sweden)
- I Even Met Happy Gypsies (Skupljači perja) – (Yugoslavia)
- In Cold Blood, directed by Richard Brooks, starring Robert Blake, Scott Wilson, Paul Stewart, John Forsythe
- I'll Never Forget What's 'isname, directed by Michael Winner, starring Oliver Reed and Orson Welles – (U.K.)
- In Like Flint, starring James Coburn, Lee J. Cobb, Jean Hale
- In the Heat of the Night, directed by Norman Jewison, starring Sidney Poitier and Rod Steiger—winner of 5 Academy Awards including best picture
- The Incident, starring Martin Sheen and Beau Bridges
- It's a Bikini World, starring Deborah Walley and Tommy Kirk

=== J ===
- Jewel Thief, starring Dev Anand, Vyjayanthimala and Ashok Kumar – (India)
- The Jokers, directed by Michael Winner, starring Oliver Reed and Michael Crawford – (U.K.)
- Journey to the Center of Time, directed by David L. Hewitt
- Jules Verne's Rocket to the Moon, directed by Don Sharp – (U.K.)
- The Jungle Book, directed by Wolfgang Reitherman, an animated musical by Walt Disney Productions

=== K ===
- Kidnapping, Caucasian Style (Kavkazskaya plennitsa, ili Novie priklucheniya Shurika) – (USSR)
- King Kong Escapes (Kingu Kongu no gyakushû) – (Japan/U.S.)
- The King's Pirate, starring Doug McClure and Jill St. John
- Kinoautomat – (Czechoslovakia)
- Kyu-chan no Dekkai Yume – (Japan)

=== L ===
- The Last Adventure (Les aventuriers), directed by Robert Enrico – (France/Italy)
- The Last Killer (L'ultimo killer, a.k.a. Django the Last Killer), starring George Eastman and Anthony Ghidra
- A Long Journey (Largo viaje) – (Chile)
- The Long Duel, starring Yul Brynner, Trevor Howard, Harry Andrews and Charlotte Rampling – (U.K.)
- Love Affair, or the Case of the Missing Switchboard Operator (Ljubavni slučaj ili tragedija službenice P.T.T.) – (Yugoslavia)

=== M ===
- Mad Monster Party?, animated film featuring Boris Karloff
- Magical Mystery Tour – TV film with the Beatles – (U.K.)
- Maneater of Hydra, directed by Mel Welles – (Spain/West Germany)
- A Man Vanishes (Ningen Johatsu), directed by Shohei Imamura – (Japan)
- Marat/Sade, directed by Peter Brook – (U.K.)
- Marketa Lazarová, directed by František Vláčil – (Czechoslovakia)
- The Million Eyes of Sumuru, starring George Nader, Frankie Avalon and Shirley Eaton – (U.K.)
- The Mitten (Varezhka), directed by Roman Kachanov – (USSR)
- More Than a Miracle (C'era una volta), starring Sophia Loren, Omar Sharif and Dolores del Río – (Italy/France)
- Mouchette, directed by Robert Bresson – (France)
- The Mummy's Shroud, starring André Morell and John Phillips – (U.K.)
- My Wife's Dignity, directed by Fatin Abdel Wahab, starring Salah Zulfikar and Shadia – (Egypt)

=== N ===
- The Naked Runner, directed by Sidney J. Furie, starring Frank Sinatra – (U.K.)
- The Night of the Generals, starring Peter O'Toole, Omar Sharif, Tom Courtenay – (U.K./France)

=== O ===
- Oedipus Rex (Edipo Re), directed by Pier Paolo Pasolini, starring Silvana Mangano – (Italy)
- Oh Dad, Poor Dad, Mamma's Hung You in the Closet and I'm Feelin' So Sad, starring Rosalind Russell and Robert Morse
- One-Armed Swordsman (Dubei dao), directed by Chang Cheh – (Hong Kong)
- Oscar, directed by Édouard Molinaro – (France)
- Our Mother's House, starring Dirk Bogarde – (U.K.)

=== P ===
- Paranoia – (Netherlands)
- Pedro Páramo, starring John Gavin – (Mexico)
- Peppermint Frappé, directed by Carlos Saura – (Spain)
- The Plank, directed by and starring Eric Sykes with Tommy Cooper – (U.K.)
- Playing Soldiers (Mali vojnici) – (Yugoslavia)
- Playtime, directed by and starring Jacques Tati – (France)
- Point Blank, directed by John Boorman, starring Lee Marvin and Angie Dickinson
- Poor Cow, directed by Ken Loach, starring Terence Stamp and Carol White – (U.K.)
- Portrait of Jason, directed by Shirley Clarke
- The President's Analyst, starring James Coburn
- Privilege, directed by Peter Watkins, starring Paul Jones and Jean Shrimpton – (U.K.)

=== Q ===
- Quatermass and the Pit, starring James Donald – (U.K.)

=== R ===
- Ram Aur Shyam (Ram and Shyam), starring Dilip Kumar – (India)
- The Rats Woke Up (Buđenje pacova) – (Yugoslavia)
- The Red and the White (Csillagosok, katonak), directed by Miklós Jancsó – (Hungary)
- Reflections in a Golden Eye, directed by John Huston, starring Marlon Brando and Elizabeth Taylor
- The Reluctant Astronaut, starring Don Knotts
- The Ride to Hangman's Tree, directed by Alan Rafkin
- Robbery, directed by Peter Yates, starring Stanley Baker – (U.K.)
- Rosie!, starring Rosalind Russell
- Rough Night in Jericho, starring Dean Martin and George Peppard

=== S ===
- The Sailor from Gibraltar, starring Ian Bannen, Jeanne Moreau, Vanessa Redgrave, Orson Welles – (U.K.)
- The St. Valentine's Day Massacre, starring Jason Robards, George Segal, Ralph Meeker and Jean Hale
- Le samouraï (The Samurai), starring Alain Delon – (France)
- Samurai Rebellion (Jōi-uchi: Hairyō tsuma shimatsu), directed by Masaki Kobayashi, starring Toshiro Mifune – (Japan)
- The Shooting, starring Warren Oates, Millie Perkins and Jack Nicholson
- The Shuttered Room, starring Gig Young, Carol Lynley and Oliver Reed – (U.K.)
- Slave Girls, starring Martine Beswick and Michael Latimer – (U.K.)
- Smashing Time, starring Rita Tushingham, Lynn Redgrave and Michael York – (U.K.)
- Soleil O, written and directed by Med Hondo (Mauritania/France)
- The Sorcerers, directed by Michael Reeves, starring Boris Karloff and Ian Ogilvy – (U.K.)
- Son of Godzilla, directed by Jun Fukuda – (Japan)
- Stimulantia, anthology film by nine directors – (Sweden)
- The Stolen Airship (Ukradená vzducholoď), directed by Karel Zeman – (Czechoslovakia/Italy)
- The Stranger (Lo straniero), directed by Luchino Visconti, starring Marcello Mastroianni – (Italy)
- Stranger in the House, starring James Mason, Geraldine Chaplin and Bobby Darin – (U.K.)
- A Stranger in Town (Un dollaro tra i denti), directed by Luigi Vanzi – (Italy/U.S.)
- Sweet Love, Bitter, starring Dick Gregory

=== T ===
- The Taming of the Shrew, directed by Franco Zeffirelli, starring Richard Burton and Elizabeth Taylor – (Italy/U.S.)
- Ten Thousand Days (Tízezer nap) – (Hungary)
- The Thief of Paris, directed by Louis Malle and starring Jean-Paul Belmondo and Geneviève Bujold – (France)
- They Came from Beyond Space, directed by Freddie Francis – (U.K.)
- This Night I'll Possess Your Corpse (Esta Noite Encarnarei no Teu Cadáver) – (Brazil)
- Thoroughly Modern Millie, directed by George Roy Hill, starring Julie Andrews, Mary Tyler Moore, Carol Channing
- Thunder Alley, directed by Richard Rush, starring Annette Funicello
- The Tied Up Balloon, directed by Binka Zhelyazkova and starring Georgi Partsalev, Grigor Vachkov, Georgi Kaloyanchev, Konstantin Kotsev – (Bulgaria)
- The Tiger Makes Out, starring Eli Wallach and Anne Jackson
- The Tiger and the Pussycat, starring Vittorio Gassman, Ann-Margret, Eleanor Parker – (Italy)
- Titicut Follies, a documentary by Frederick Wiseman
- To Sir, with Love, starring Sidney Poitier – (U.K.)
- Tobruk, starring Rock Hudson and George Peppard
- Tony Rome, directed by Gordon Douglas, starring Frank Sinatra, Jill St. John, Gena Rowlands, Richard Conte, Sue Lyon
- Torture Garden, starring Burgess Meredith, Michael Bryant, Beverly Adams, Peter Cushing, Jack Palance – (U.K.)
- The Trip, directed by Roger Corman, starring Peter Fonda and Susan Strasberg
- Two for the Road, directed by Stanley Donen, starring Audrey Hepburn and Albert Finney – (U.K.)
- The Two of Us (Le vieil homme et l'enfant), directed by Claude Berri – (France)

=== U ===
- Ultraman – (Japan)
- Ulysses, starring Milo O'Shea – (U.K./U.S.)
- Untamable Angelique (Indomptable Angélique), directed by Bernard Borderie – (France/Italy/West Germany)
- Up the Down Staircase, starring Sandy Dennis
- Upkar, directed by and starring Manoj Kumar – (India)

=== V ===
- Valley of the Dolls, directed by Mark Robson, starring Barbara Parkins, Patty Duke, Sharon Tate, Susan Hayward, Paul Burke, Lee Grant
- The Venetian Affair, starring Elke Sommer, Robert Vaughn, Felicia Farr
- The Vengeance of Fu Manchu, starring Christopher Lee and Tony Ferrer – (U.K.)
- Violated Angels (Okasareta Hakui) – (Japan)
- Viy (aka Spirit of Evil) – (USSR)
- The Vulture, starring Robert Hutton and Diane Clare – (U.K.)

=== W ===
- Wait Until Dark, directed by Terence Young, starring Audrey Hepburn, Alan Arkin, Richard Crenna, Jack Weston and Efrem Zimbalist, Jr.
- War and Peace (Voyna i mir), directed by Sergei Bondarchuk – (USSR)
- The War Wagon, directed by Burt Kennedy, starring John Wayne and Kirk Douglas
- Warning Shot, starring David Janssen, Stefanie Powers, Joan Collins, Eleanor Parker, Lillian Gish and George Sanders
- Waterhole No. 3, starring James Coburn, Carroll O'Connor and Margaret Blye
- The Way West, starring Kirk Douglas, Richard Widmark, Robert Mitchum, Lola Albright and Sally Field
- We Still Kill the Old Way (A ciascuno il suo), starring Gian Maria Volonté and Irene Papas – (Italy)
- Weekend (Week-end), directed by Jean-Luc Godard – (France)
- Welcome to Hard Times, starring Henry Fonda, Aldo Ray, Janice Rule and Warren Oates
- The Whisperers, starring Edith Evans and Nanette Newman – (U.K.)
- The White Bus, a short film by Lindsay Anderson – (U.K.)
- Who's Minding the Mint? starring Jim Hutton, Dorothy Provine, Walter Brennan and Milton Berle
- Who's That Knocking at My Door, directed by Martin Scorsese
- The Witches (Le streghe), produced by Dino De Laurentiis – (Italy/France)

=== Y ===
- You Only Live Twice, starring Sean Connery as James Bond – (U.K.)
- The Young Girls of Rochefort, directed by Jacques Demy, starring Catherine Deneuve and Françoise Dorléac – (France)

== Short film series ==
- Looney Tunes (1930–1969)
- Merrie Melodies (1931–1969)
- Speedy Gonzales (1953–1968)
- Daffy Duck (1937–1968)
- Cool Cat (1967–1969)
- Merlin the Magic Mouse (1967–1969)

== Births ==
- January 1
  - Richard Leaf, English actor
  - John Requa, American director and screenwriter
- January 2
  - Tia Carrere, American actress
  - James Marshall, American actor
- January 5
  - Darrell D'Silva, British actor
  - Ross Mullan, Canadian-British actor and puppeteer
- January 7 – Irrfan Khan, Indian actor (d. 2020)
- January 9 – David Costabile, American actor
- January 10 – Trini Alvarado, American actress
- January 11 – Derek Riddell, Scottish actor
- January 12 – Vendela Kirsebom, Norwegian-Swedish model, television host and actress
- January 14
  - Kerri Green, American actress, director and screenwriter
  - Emily Watson, English actress
- January 17 – Song Kang-ho, South Korean actor
- January 20 – Stacey Dash, American actress
- January 23 – Steve Box, English animator and director
- January 24 – Phil LaMarr, American actor, voice actor, comedian and writer
- January 26 – Bryan Callen, American stand-up comedian, actor, writer and podcaster
- February 3 – Paul Grant, British actor and stuntman (d. 2023)
- February 5 – Chris Parnell, American actor, voice artist and comedian
- February 6 – Michelle Thrush, Canadian actress and activist
- February 9 - Nicholas Sadler, American actor
- February 10 – Laura Dern, American actress
- February 13 – Carolyn Lawrence, American actress and voice actress
- February 14 – Kelly AuCoin, American actor
- February 16
  - Matthew Cottle, English actor
  - Pasha D. Lychnikoff, Russian-American actor
- February 19 – Benicio del Toro, Puerto Rican actor
- February 20
  - David Herman, American actor
  - Andrew Shue, American actor
  - Lili Taylor, American actress
- March 1
  - Rosyam Nor, Malaysian actor
  - Steffan Rhodri, Welsh actor
- March 4 – Sam Taylor-Johnson, born Samantha Taylor-Wood, English-born director
- March 6 – Connie Britton, American actress, singer and producer
- March 11 - John Barrowman, Scottish-American actor
- March 12 - Rick Worthy, American actor
- March 15 – Pierre Coffin, French voice actor, animator and film director, best known for voicing the Minions.
- March 16 – Lauren Graham, American actress
- March 20 – Marc Warren, English actor
- March 21 - Scott Takeda, American actor and filmmaker
- March 27 – Talisa Soto, American actress
- March 30 – Megumi Hayashibara, Japanese voice actress, singer, lyricist and radio personality
- April 2 – Renée Estevez, American actress and screenwriter
- April 6 – Kathleen Barr, Canadian voice, stage and television actress
- April 14 - Jaimz Woolvett, Canadian actor
- April 17 – Kimberly Elise, American actress
- April 18 – Maria Bello, American actress
- April 22
  - Sheryl Lee, American actress
  - Sherri Shepherd, American actress, comedian and television personality
- April 23 – Melina Kanakaredes, American actress
- April 26
  - Marianne Jean-Baptiste, English actress
  - Peter Jordan, German actor
- April 28
  - Claes Bang, Danish actor and musician
  - Gary Riley, American former actor
- April 29 – Master P, American rapper and actor
- May 1
  - Scott Coffey, American actor/director
  - Tim McGraw, American country singer, songwriter and actor
- May 4
  - Ana Gasteyer, American actress, comedian and singer
  - Akiko Yajima, Japanese voice actress
- May 15 – Madhuri Dixit, Indian actress
- May 16
  - Brian F. O'Byrne, Irish actor
  - Ramon Tikaram, British actor
- May 17 - Cameron Bancroft, Canadian actor
- May 18 – Bob Stephenson, American actor
- May 19
  - Geraldine Somerville, Irish-British actress
  - Morten Tyldum, Norwegian director
- May 20 – Stephanie Niznik, American actress (d. 2019)
- May 22 - Brooke Smith, American actress
- May 24
  - Eric Close, American actor
  - Heavy D, Jamaican-American rapper, record producer, and actor (d. 2011)
- May 30 – Steven Mackintosh, English actor and narrator
- May 31 – Sandrine Bonnaire, French actress
- June 3 – Jason Jones, Canadian actor and comedian
- June 5 – Ron Livingston, American actor
- June 6
  - Max Casella, American actor
  - Paul Giamatti, American actor
- June 8 - Dan Futterman, American actor, screenwriter and producer
- June 12 – Frances O'Connor, British-Australian actress and director
- June 17 – Sonya Eddy, American actress (d. 2022)
- June 19
  - Chris Larkin, English actor
  - Mia Sara, American actress
  - Eric Schweig, Canadian Inuvialuk actor
- June 20 – Nicole Kidman, Australian actress
- June 21 - Carrie Preston, American actress, director and producer
- June 26 - Christina Fulton, American actress
- June 27 - David Ngoombujarra, Indigenous Australian actor (d. 2011)
- June 28 – Gil Bellows, Canadian actor, screenwriter and director
- June 29 – Melora Hardin, American actress and singer
- July 1
  - Pamela Anderson, American actress
  - Ritchie Coster, English actor
- July 9 – Indrek Taalmaa, Estonian actor
- July 12 – Natalie Desselle-Reid, American actress (d. 2020)
- July 14 – Mary Woodvine, British actress
- July 16
  - Jonathan Adams, American actor
  - Will Ferrell, American actor
- July 18 – Vin Diesel, American actor
- July 20
  - Reed Diamond, American actor
  - Julian Rhind-Tutt, English actor
- July 22
  - Rhys Ifans, Welsh actor and singer
  - Irene Bedard, American actress
- July 23 – Philip Seymour Hoffman, American actor (d. 2014)
- July 25 – Matt LeBlanc, American actor
- July 26 – Jason Statham, English actor
- July 27 – Jill Messick, American producer (d. 2018)
- July 28 – Carlos Jacott, American actor
- July 31 – Rodney Harvey, American actor (d. 1998)
- August 3 – Mathieu Kassovitz, French actor, director, producer and screenwriter
- August 4 – Timothy Adams, American actor and model
- August 7 – Edoardo Costa, Italian-born actor
- August 10 – Sean Blakemore, American actor
- August 11 – Collin Chou, Taiwanese actor and martial artist
- August 12 - Brent Sexton, American actor
- August 13 – Quinn Cummings, American former child actress
- August 16 - Donovan Leitch, British-American actor and singer
- August 19 – Lucy Briers, English actress
- August 21 – Carrie-Anne Moss, Canadian actress
- August 22
  - Adewale Akinnuoye-Agbaje, British actor and director
  - Ty Burrell, American actor
- August 25 – Tom Hollander, English actor
- August 26
  - Michelle St. John, American actress, singer, producer and director
  - Oleg Taktarov, Russian actor
- August 29 – Nick Fletcher, Welsh editor
- September 1
  - Craig Gillespie, Australian-American director
  - Steve Pemberton, British actor, comedian, director and writer
- September 6
  - Chad L. Coleman, American actor
  - Macy Gray, American singer and actress
- September 9 _ Akshay Kumar Indian actor
- September 7 – Leslie Jones, American comedian and actress
- September 11 – Harry Connick, Jr., American actor and singer
- September 12 – Louis C.K., American stand-up comedian, writer, actor and filmmaker
- September 14
  - Dan Cortese, American actor and director
  - Patrick O'Neal, American former actor and reporter
- September 17 - Malik Yoba, American actor
- September 18 - Tara Fitzgerald, English actress
- September 20 – Kristen Johnston, American actress
- September 25
  - Saffron Henderson, Canadian voice actress and singer
  - Audrey Wasilewski, American actress
- September 27 – Debi Derryberry, American voice actress
- September 28 – Mira Sorvino, American actress
- October 2 – Lew Temple, American actor
- October 3
  - Eriq Ebouaney, French actor
  - Tiara Jacquelina, Malaysian actress
  - Denis Villeneuve, French-Canadian filmmaker
- October 4 – Liev Schreiber, American actor
- October 5 – Guy Pearce, Australian actor
- October 6 - Bruno Bichir, Mexican actor
- October 7 – Khan Bonfils, Korean-Danish actor (d. 2014)
- October 11 – Artie Lange, American actor and comedian
- October 13 – Kate Walsh, American actress
- October 15 – Götz Otto, German actor
- October 22 - Larissa Laskin, Canadian actress
- October 27 – Scott Weiland, American singer and songwriter (d. 2015)
- October 28
  - Kevin Macdonald, Scottish director
  - Julia Roberts, American actress
- October 29
  - Joely Fisher, American actress and singer
  - Rufus Sewell, English thespian
- October 31 – Vanilla Ice, American rapper, actor, and television host
- November 2
  - Akira Ishida, Japanese actor and voice actor
  - Chris Williams, American actor and comedian
- November 5 - Judy Reyes, American actress and producer
- November 6 – Rebecca Schaeffer, American actress and model (d. 1989)
- November 8 – Kamar de los Reyes, Puerto Rican actor (d. 2023)
- November 10 – Michael Jai White, American actor
- November 11 – Frank John Hughes, American actor and screenwriter
- November 13
  - Michael Chambers, American actor
  - Juhi Chawla, Indian actress
  - Jimmy Kimmel, American television host, actor, comedian, writer and producer
  - Steve Zahn, American actor
- November 16 – Lisa Bonet, American actress
- November 17 – Dean Lorey, American actor, writer and producer
- November 22 – Mark Ruffalo, American actor
- November 23 – Robert Popper, British producer, writer and actor
- November 25
  - Gregg Turkington, Australian-born American entertainer, actor, musician and writer
  - Kazuya Nakai, Japanese voice actor and narrator
- November 28
  - Anna Nicole Smith, American model and actress (d. 2007)
  - Stephnie Weir, American actress, comedian and writer
- December 1 – Stephen Blackehart, American character actor, author and producer
- December 5
  - Joseph Barbara, American actor
  - Juan Carlos Fresnadillo, Spanish director, screenwriter and producer
- December 6
  - Judd Apatow, American comedian, director, producer and screenwriter
  - Lucia Rijker, Dutch boxer and actress
- December 8 – Kotono Mitsuishi, Japanese voice actress, actress, singer and narrator
- December 11
  - Peter Kelamis, Australian-Canadian actor
  - Mo'Nique, American actress
- December 12 - Anne Bobby, American actress
- December 13 – Jamie Foxx, American actor
- December 14 – Janne Mortil, Canadian-American actress
- December 16 – Miranda Otto, Australian actress
- December 18 – Robert Wahlberg, American actor
- December 26 – Steve Le Marquand, Australian actor
- December 29 - James McTeigue, Australian director
- December 30 – Steven Waddington, English actor
- December 31 - Rebecca Rigg, Australian actress

== Deaths ==
- January 8 – Zbigniew Cybulski, 39, Polish actor, Ashes and Diamonds, The Saragossa Manuscript
- January 21 – Ann Sheridan, 51, American actress, Angels with Dirty Faces, Kings Row
- January 22 – Jobyna Ralston, 67, American actress, Wings, The Freshman
- January 28
  - Ruut Tarmo, 70, Estonian actor, Noored kotkad
  - Václav Wasserman, 68, Czech actor, screenwriter and director, The Undertaker, Saturday
- February 1 – Richard L. Breen, 48, American screenwriter, Captain Newman, M.D., Titanic
- February 6 – Martine Carol, 46, French actress, Lola Montes, Around the World in 80 Days
- February 10 – Ralph Murphy, 71, American director, I Want a Divorce, 70,000 Witnesses
- February 13 – Forugh Farrokhzad, 32, Iranian poet and film director, The House Is Black, in automobile accident
- February 14 – Sig Ruman, 82, German actor, Stalag 17, Ninotchka
- February 15 – Antonio Moreno, 79, Spanish-American actor and director, The Searchers, Creature from the Black Lagoon
- February 16
  - Smiley Burnette, 55, American actor, King of the Cowboys, Ridin' on a Rainbow
  - Amund Rydland, 79, Norwegian actor
- February 17 – Louise Henry, 55, American actress, There Goes the Groom, 45 Fathers
- February 21
  - Charles Beaumont, 38, American television and film writer, Brain Dead, The Intruder
  - William Newell, 73, American actor, Who Is Hope Schuyler?, Our Miss Brooks
- February 24 – Franz Waxman, 60, German film composer, Stalag 17, Mister Roberts
- March 5 – Mischa Auer, 61, Russian actor, You Can't Take It With You, Destry Rides Again
- March 6 – Nelson Eddy, 65, American singer and actor, Make Mine Music, The Chocolate Soldier
- March 11 – Geraldine Farrar, 85, American singer and actress, Carmen, Joan the Woman
- April 10 – Aage Winther-Jørgensen, 66, Danish actor, The Rector of Veilbye, Bussen
- April 15 – Totò, 69, Italian actor and writer, Big Deal on Madonna Street, The Hawks and the Sparrows
- April 22 – Tom Conway, 62, Russian-American actor, The Falcon's Brother, Cat People
- April 24
  - Fred C. Newmeyer, 78, American director, Safety Last!, They Never Come Back
  - Frank Overton, 49, American actor, To Kill a Mockingbird, Fail-Safe
- April 29 – Anthony Mann, 60, American director, El Cid, Winchester '73
- May 7
  - Anne Bauchens, 85, American film editor
  - Judith Evelyn, 58, American actress, Rear Window, Giant
- May 8
  - LaVerne Andrews, 55, American singer and actress (Andrews Sisters), Road to Rio, Follow the Boys
  - Barbara Payton, 39, American actress, Bride of the Gorilla, Kiss Tomorrow Goodbye
- May 14 – James Tinling, 78, American director, Charlie Chan in Shanghai, 45 Fathers
- May 30 – Claude Rains, 77, British actor, Casablanca, Notorious, Mr. Smith Goes to Washington, The Invisible Man
- June 7 – Dorothy Parker, 73, American writer, A Star Is Born, Saboteur
- June 10
  - Spencer Tracy, 67, American actor, Boys Town, Judgment at Nuremberg, Guess Who's Coming to Dinner, It's a Mad, Mad, Mad, Mad World
  - Frank Butler, 76, British-American screenwriter, Going My Way, Road to Morocco
- June 16 – Reginald Denny, 75, British actor, Rebecca, Mr. Blandings Builds His Dream House
- June 26 – Françoise Dorléac, 25, French actress, The Soft Skin, Cul-de-sac
- June 29 – Jayne Mansfield, 34, American actress, The Wayward Bus, The Girl Can't Help It
- July 8 – Vivien Leigh, 53, British actress, Gone with the Wind, A Streetcar Named Desire
- July 17
  - Enzo Petito, 69, Italian actor, The Good, the Bad and the Ugly
  - Cyril Ring, 74, American actor, Melody Parade, Mystery of the 13th Guest
- July 21
  - Basil Rathbone, 75, British actor, The Adventures of Robin Hood, The Adventures of Sherlock Holmes
  - David Weisbart, 52, American film editor and producer, Rebel Without a Cause, Them!
- August 9 – Anton Walbrook, 70, Austrian actor, La Ronde, The Life and Death of Colonel Blimp
- August 13 – Jane Darwell, 87, American actress, The Grapes of Wrath, Gone with the Wind
- August 25 – Paul Muni, 71, Ukrainian-American actor, Scarface, I Am a Fugitive from a Chain Gang
- August 28 – Maurice Elvey, 79, English director and producer, The Life Story of David Lloyd George, The Hound of the Baskervilles
- September 1 – James Dunn, 65, American actor, A Tree Grows in Brooklyn, Bright Eyes
- October 12 – Nat Pendleton, 72, American actor, former Olympic swimmer, The Thin Man, The Great Ziegfeld
- October 29 – Julien Duvivier, 71, French director, Tales of Manhattan, Flesh and Fantasy
- October 30 – Charles Trowbridge, 85, American actor, Sergeant York, Strange Alibi
- November 1 – Benita Hume, 61, British actress, The Worst Woman in Paris?, The Private Life of Don Juan
- November 4 – June Thorburn, 36, British actress, The Scarlet Blade, The 3 Worlds of Gulliver
- November 9 – Charles Bickford, 76, American actor, Days of Wine and Roses, The Song of Bernadette
- November 21 – Florence Reed, 84, American actress, The Eternal Mother, Great Expectations
- November 29 – Theo Marcuse, 47, American actor, The Cincinnati Kid, Harum Scarum
- December 4
  - Bert Lahr, 72, American actor, The Wizard of Oz, Sing Your Worries Away
  - Sarah Padden, 86, American actress, Women Won't Tell, The Midnight Lady
- December 10 – Otis Redding, 26, American singer, Monterey Pop, Popcorn
- December 14 – Frank Moran, 80, American boxer and actor, Sailor's Luck, Return of the Ape Man
- December 21 – Stuart Erwin, 64, American actor, Pigskin Parade, Going Hollywood
- December 23 – Kaaren Verne, 49, German actress, All Through the Night, Sherlock Holmes and the Secret Weapon
- December 29 – Paul Whiteman, 77, American bandleader, King of Jazz, Thanks a Million

== Film debuts ==
- Alice Arno – Only a Coffin
- Luke Askew – Hurry Sundown
- Joe Don Baker – Cool Hand Luke
- Robby Benson – Wait Until Dark
- Helmut Berger – The Witches
- Corbin Bernsen – Clambake
- Eileen Brennan – Divorce American Style
- Jackie Burroughs – The Ernie Game
- Gary Busey – The Love-Ins
- Maxwell Caulfield – Accident
- Bud Cort – Up the Down Staircase
- Nathalie Delon – Le Samouraï
- William Devane – In the Country
- Richard Dreyfuss – Valley of the Dolls
- Faye Dunaway – Hurry Sundown
- Marshall Efron – Funnyman
- Sam Elliott – The Way West
- Morgan Fairchild – Bonnie and Clyde
- Edwige Fenech – All Mad About Him
- Fionnula Flanagan – Ulysses
- Robert Forster – Reflections in a Golden Eye
- James Gammon – Cool Hand Luke
- Wings Hauser – First to Fight
- Dustin Hoffman – The Tiger Makes Out
- Barry Humphries – Bedazzled
- Maurice Jarre (film composer) – The 25th Hour
- Freddie Jones – Marat/Sade
- Harvey Keitel – Who's That Knocking at My Door
- Swoosie Kurtz – The Tiger Makes Out
- Tim Matheson – Divorce American Style
- Nerina Montagnani – Death Rides a Horse
- Pat Morita – Thoroughly Modern Millie
- Michael Murphy – Double Trouble
- Werner Pochath – Der Tod eines Doppelgängers
- Richard Pryor – The Busy Body
- Rob Reiner – Enter Laughing
- Ian Richardson – Marat/Sade
- Nina Ruslanova – Brief Encounters
- John P. Ryan – The Tiger Makes Out
- Martin Scorsese (director) – Who's That Knocking at My Door
- Rade Šerbedžija – Iluzija
- Martin Sheen – The Incident
- Richard Stahl – Funnyman
- Don Stroud – Banning
- Kevin Tighe – The Graduate
- Jan-Michael Vincent – The Bandits
- Jon Voight – Fearless Frank
- Ralph Waite – Cool Hand Luke
- Lesley Ann Warren – The Happiest Millionaire
- Fred Willard – Teenage Mother
- Scott Wilson – In the Heat of the Night
- Paul Winfield – The Perils of Pauline
- Michael York – The Taming of the Shrew
- Anthony Zerbe – Cool Hand Luke
