= List of Spanish films of 1967 =

A list of films produced in Spain in 1967 (see 1967 in film).

== 1967 ==
Title	Director	Cast	Genre	Notes
Amor a la española		Alfredo Landa, José Luis López Vázquez	Comedy	
Avenger X	Piero Vivarelli	Pier Paolo Capponi, Giovanna Giardina, Armando Calvo	—N/a	Italian-Spanish co-production
El amor brujo	Francisco Rovira Beleta	Antonio Gades, La Polaca, Camarón de la Isla	Musical drama	Academy Award nominee; based on El amor brujo by Manuel de Falla, entered into the 5th Moscow International Film Festival
La Busca	Angelino Fons	Jacques Perrin, Emma Penella	Drama	Pio Baroja's novel. Best Actor at Venice Film Festival
Cada vez que...	Carlos Durán	Joaquim Jordà, Luis Ciges	Drama	Escuela de Barcelona
Cervantes	Vincent Sherman	Horst Buchholz, Gina Lollobrigida	Biopic	
Dante no es únicamente severo	Jacinto Esteva & Joaquim Jordà		Experimental, Surrealism	Escuela de Barcelona
Ditirambo (film)	Gonzalo Suárez			Escuela de Barcelona
Gentleman Killer	Giorgio Stegani	Anthony Steffen, Eduardo Fajardo, Silvia Solar	Western	
Il marchio di Kriminal	Fernando Cerchio	Roel Bos, Helga Liné, Andrea Bosic	—N/a	
Las Pirañas (AKA La Boutique)	Luis García Berlanga	Sonia Bruno, Rodolfo Bebán	Black Comedy	Co-production with Argentina.
Peppermint Frappé	Carlos Saura	José Luis López Vázquez, Geraldine Chaplin		Shown at Cannes and at Berlin
Último encuentro	Antonio Eceiza			Entered into the 1967 Cannes Film Festival
Sor Citroën	Pedro Lazaga	Gracita Morales, Rafaela Aparicio	Comedy	
