= List of Soviet films of 1967 =

A list of films produced in the Soviet Union in 1967 (see 1967 in film).

== 1967 ==
Title	Russian title	Director	Cast	Genre	Notes
1967
Adventures of Mowgli	Маугли	Roman Davydov	Sergei Martinson	Animation	
The Andromeda Nebula	Туманность Андромеды	Yevgeni Sherstobitov	Sergei Stolyarov, Vija Artmane, Nikolai Kryukov	Sci-fi	
Anna Karenina	Анна Каренина	Aleksandr Zarkhi	Tatiana Samoilova, Nikolai Gritsenko, Vasili Lanovoy, Yury Yakovlev	Drama	Listed to compete in the 1968 Cannes Film Festival
Blasted Hell	Взорванный ад	Ivan Lukinsky	Gennady Bortnikov	Action	
Brief Encounters	Короткие встречи	Kira Muratova	Nina Ruslanova, Vladimir Vysotskiy, Kira Muratova, Yelena Bazilskaya, Olga Vikland	Drama, romance	
Chronicles of a Dive Bomber	Хроника пикирующего бомбардировщика	Naum Birman	Lev Vainshtein, Aleksandr Grave, Oleg Dahl	War	
Commissar	Комиссар	Aleksandr Askoldov	Nonna Mordyukova, Rolan Bykov	Drama	Released in 1988, won the Jury Grand Prix at Berlin
Day of Sun and Rain	День солнца и дождя	Viktor Sokolov	Aleksandr Barinov	Family	
Fair Wind, "Blue Bird"!	Попутного ветра, «Синяя птица»	Mikhail Ershov	Blazhenka Catalinich, Radmila Karaklaich	Adventure	
Give a Paw, Friend!	Дай лапу, Друг!	Ilya Gurin	Olga Bobkova	Family	
The Green Carriage	Зелёная карета	Yan Frid	Natalya Tenyakova, Vladimir Chestnokov, Igor Dmitriev	Drama, history	
His name was Robert	Его звали Роберт	Ilya Olshvanger	Oleg Strizhenov, Marianna Vertinskaya, Mikhail Pugovkin	Science fiction	
The Journalist	Журналист	Sergei Gerasimov	Yuri N.Vasiliev, Galina Polskikh	Drama	Won the Grand Prix at 5th Moscow International Film Festival
An Incident that no one noticed	Происшествие, которого никто не заметил	Aleksandr Volodin	Zhanna Prokhorenko	Romance	
I Loved You	Я вас любил…	Ilya Frez	Viktor Perevalov, Violetta Khusnulova, Valeri Ryzhakov, Natalya Seleznyova, Lidia Nikolayevna	Comedy, romance	
July Rain	Июльский дождь	Marlen Khutsiev	Evgeniya Uralova, Aleksandr Belyavsky, Yuri Vizbor, Yevgeniya Kozyreva, Alexander Mitta	Drama	
Kidnapping, Caucasian Style	Кавказская пленница	Leonid Gaidai	Aleksandr Demyanenko	Comedy	
Major Whirlwind	Майор "Вихрь"	Evgeniy Tashkov	Vadim Beroev, Anastasiya Voznesenskaya, Victor Pavlov	War drama	
Magician	Фокусник	Pyotr Todorovsky	Zinovy Gerdt, Alla Larionova, Yevgeny Leonov, Vladimir Basov	Drama	
The Mitten	Варежка	Roman Kachanov		Animation	
The Mysterious Wall	Таинственная стена	Irina Povolotskaya and Mikhail Sadkovich	Lev Krugly	Science fiction	
Nikolay Bauman	Николай Бауман	Semyon Tumanov	Rodion Aleksandrov	Drama	
No Password Necessary	Пароль не нужен	Boris Grigorev	Nikolay Gubenko	Action	
No Path Through Fire	В огне брода нет	Gleb Panfilov	Inna Churikova	War	
Passion of Spies	Шпионские страсти	Yefim Gamburg		Animation	
Private Life of Kuzyayev Valentin	Личная жизнь Кузяева Валентина	Ilya Averbakh and Igor Maslennikov	Viktor Ilichyov	Drama	
Retribution	Возмездие	Aleksandr Stolper	Kirill Lavrov	Drama	
The Road to 'Saturn'	Путь в «Сатурн»	Villen Azarov	Mikhail Volkov	Action	
Running on Waves	Бегущая по волнам	Pavel Lyubimov	Sava Hashamov	Drama	
Save the Drowning Man	Спасите утопающего	Pavel Arsenov	Andrei Ushakov	Comedy	
Sea Tales	Морские рассказы	Aleksey Sakharov, Aleksandr Svetlov	Nikolay Dostal	Adventure	
Tatyana's Day	Татьянин день	Isidor Annensky	Lyudmila Maksakova	Drama	
The Seventh Companion	Седьмой спутник	Grigori Aronov, Aleksei German	Andrei Popov	Drama	
The Snow Queen	Снежная королева	Gennadi Kazansky	Elena Proklova, Slava Tsyupa	Fantasy	
Torrents of Steel	Железный поток	Efim Dzigan	Nikolay Alekseev	Drama	
Sofiya Perovskaya	Софья Перовская	Lev Arnshtam		Biopic	
Spring on the Oder	Весна на Одере	Lev Saakov	Anatoliy Kuznetsov	Drama	
Stewardess	Стюардесса	Vladimir Krasnopolsky, Valery Uskov	Alla Demidova, Georgiy Zhzhonov, Vladimir Etush	Romance	
Straight Line	Прямая линия	Yuri Shvyryov	Lyudmila Dolgorukova	Drama	
Strong with Spirit	Сильные духом	Viktor Georgiyev	Gunārs Cilinskis, Ivan Pereverzev, Yevgeni Vesnik, Lyusyena Ovchinnikova, Yuri Solomin	Spy film	
Three Poplars in Plyushchikha	Три тополя на Плющихе	Tatyana Lioznova	Tatiana Doronina	Drama	
Tough Nut	Крепкий орешек	Theodor Vulfovich	Nadezhda Rumyantseva, Vitaly Solomin	Comedy	
Vertical	Вертикаль	Stanislav Govorukhin, Boris Durov	Vladimir Vysotsky, Gennadi Voropaev, Larisa Luzhina, Bukhuti Zakariadze	Drama	
Viy	Вий	Konstantin Yershov, Georgi Kropachyov	Leonid Kuravlyov, Natalya Varley	Horror	
Wedding in Malinovka	Свадьба в Малиновке	Andrei Tutyshkin		Musical, comedy	
A Winter Morning	Зимнее утро	Nikolay Lebedev	Tanya Soldatenkova	Drama	
Woman's World	Бабье царство	Alexey Saltykov	Rimma Markova, Nina Sazonova	War film	
Why the Swallow Has the Tail with Little Horns	Почему у ласточки хвостик рожками	Amen Khaydarov		Animation	First Kazakh animated film
Your Contemporary	Твой современник	Yuli Raizman	Igor Vladimirov	Drama	
Zhenya, Zhenechka and Katyusha	Женя, Женечка и «Катюша»	Vladimir Motyl	Oleg Dahl, Galina Figlovskaya	Comedy-drama, war	
