= Catonné =

Catonné is a French surname. Notable people with the surname include:

- François Catonné, French cinematographer
- Jean-Marie Catonné (born 1941), French writer
