= List of French films of 1967 =

A list of films produced in France in 1967.

== The list ==
Title	Director	Cast	Genre	Notes
The 25th Hour	Henri Verneuil	Anthony Quinn, Virna Lisi, Serge Reggiani	War	French-Italian co-production
All Mad About Him	Norbert Carbonnaux	Robert Hirsch, Sophie Desmarets, Maria Latour, Julien Guiomar	Comedy	Co-production with Italy
An Idiot in Paris	Serge Korber	Dany Carrel, Jean Lefebvre, Bernard Blier	Comedy	
Asterix the Gaul	René Goscinny		Adventure, family	Animated film
Belle de jour	Luis Buñuel	Catherine Deneuve, Jean Sorel, Michel Piccoli	Drama	French-Italian co-production
The Champagne Murders	Claude Chabrol	Anthony Perkins, Maurice Ronet, Yvonne Furneaux	Crime	
Col cuore in gola	Tinto Brass	Jean-Louis Trintignant, Ewa Aulin, Roberto Bisacco	Thriller	Italian-French co-production
Diabolically Yours	Julien Duvivier	Senta Berger, Alain Delon, Sergio Fantoni	Thriller	French-Italian-West German co-production
Fantômas contre Scotland Yard	André Hunebelle	Jean Marais, Louis de Funès, Mylène Demongeot	Crime, comedy	French-Italian co-production
If I Were a Spy	Bernard Blier	Bernard Blier, Bruno Cremer	Thriller	
Jeu de massacre	Alain Jessua	Jean-Pierre Cassel, Claudine Auger, Michel Duchaussoy	Comedy	
La Chinoise	Jean-Luc Godard	Juliet Berto, Anne Wiazemsky, Jean-Pierre Léaud	Comedy-drama	
La Collectionneuse	Éric Rohmer	Haydee Politoff, Patrick Bauchau, Daniel Pommereulle	Comedy-drama	
Lamiel				
Le Grand Meaulnes	Jean-Gabriel Albicocco	Brigitte Fossey, Jean Blaise	Drama	
Le Samouraï	Jean-Pierre Melville	Alain Delon, Nathalie Delon, Cathy Rosier	Crime, thriller	French-Italian co-production
Les aventuriers	Robert Enrico	Alain Delon, Lino Ventura, Joanna Shimkus	Adventure	French-Italian co-production
Les Contrebandières	Luc Moullet	Françoise Vatel, Monique Thiriet, Johnny Monteilhet	Comedy	
The Looters	Jacques Besnard	Frederick Stafford, Jean Seberg	Adventure	French-Italian co-production
The Man Who Was Worth Millions	Michel Boisrond	Frederick Stafford, Raymond Pellegrin, Peter van Eyck	Crime	French-Italian co-production
Mouchette	Robert Bresson	Nadine Nortier, Jean-Claude Guilbert, Maria Cardinal	Drama	
My Love, My Love	Nadine Trintignant	Jean-Louis Trintignant, Valérie Lagrange	Comedy-drama	
The Night of the Generals	Anatole Litvak	Peter O'Toole, Omar Sharif, Tom Courtenay	Mystery	British-French co-production
Oscar	Édouard Molinaro	Louis de Funès, Claude Rich, Claude Gensac	Comedy	
The Peking Medallion	Frank Winterstein	Elke Sommer, Robert Stack, Nancy Kwan		West German-French-Italian co-production
Playtime	Jacques Tati	Jacques Tati, Barbara Dennek, Georges Montant	Comedy	French-Italian co-production
Shock Troops	Costa-Gavras	Michel Piccoli, Bruno Cremer, Jean-Claude Brialy	War	French-Italian co-production
Soleil O	Med Hondo	Robert Liensol, Theo Legitimus, Yane Barry		French-Mauritanian co-production
The Thief of Paris	Louis Malle	Jean-Paul Belmondo, Geneviève Bujold, Marie Dubois	Crime	French-Italian co-production
The Three Fantastic Supermen	Gianfranco Parolini	Luciano Stella, Aldo Canti	—N/a	Italian-Yugoslav-French-West German co-production
To Commit a Murder	Édouard Molinaro	Louis Jourdan, Senta Berger, Edmond O'Brien	Spy	
Trans-Europ-Express	Alain Robbe-Grillet	Jean-Louis Trintignant, Marie-France Pisier, Charles Millot		
The Two of Us	Claude Berri	Michel Simon, Luce Fabiole, Alain Cohen		
Tom Dollar	Marcello Ciorciolini	Maurice Poli, Giorgia Moll, Erika Blanc	Spy	Italian-French co-production
Two or Three Things I Know About Her	Jean-Luc Godard	Marina Vlady, Anny Duperey, Roger Montsoret		
Untamable Angelique	Bernard Borderie	Michèle Mercier, Robert Hossein, Roger Pigaut	Adventure	Co-production with Italy and West Germany
The Viscount	Maurice Cloche	Kerwin Mathews, Jean Yanne, Fernando Rey	Crime	Co-production with Italy and Spain
The Wall	Serge Roullet			Entered into the 17th Berlin International Film Festival
Weekend	Jean-Luc Godard	Mireille Darc, Jean Yanne, Jean-Pierre Kalfon	Avant-garde	French-Italian co-production
Woman Times Seven	Vittorio De Sica	Shirley MacLaine, Peter Sellers, Elspeth March	Comedy-drama	American-French co-production
The Young Girls of Rochefort	Jacques Demy	Catherine Deneuve, George Chakiris, Françoise Dorléac	Musical, romance	

== See also ==
- 1967 in France
