= Mikhail Plotkin =

Russian music producer (1944–2021)

Mikhail Vladimirovich Plotkin (Russian: Михаил Владимирович Плоткин; 20 April 1944 – 1 May 2021) was a Russian music producer and administrator (Vesyolye Rebyata, Samotsvety, Boris Amarantov, Leysya, Pesnya, Alla Pugacheva).

== Career ==
Plotkin began his career on the stage as a stagehand for the duo Shurov and Rykunin in 1964. Then he worked for Boris Amarantov in the "Souvenir" dance ensemble.

== Death ==
He died of complications from COVID-19 in Moscow at age 77 during the COVID-19 pandemic in Russia.
