= West Indies: The Fugitive Slaves of Liberty =

1979 French-Algerian-Mauritanian drama film by Med Hondo

West Indies
- Directed by: Med Hondo
- Screenplay by: Daniel Boukman; Med Hondo
- Based on: Les négriers by Daniel Boukman
- Starring: Robert Liensol; Roland Bertin; Hélène Vincent; Philippe Clévenot
- Cinematography: François Catonné
- Edited by: Youcef Tobni
- Music by: Georges Rabol; Franck Valmont
- Release date: 1979 (Mauritania)
- Running time: 110 minutes
- Countries: France; Algeria; Mauritania
- Language: French
- Budget: US$1.35 million

West Indies: The Fugitive Slaves of Liberty (French: West Indies ou les Nègres marrons de la liberté) is a 1979 French-language musical drama film directed by Med Hondo. The plot of the film was adapted from a play titled Les négriers (The Slavers), written by Daniel Boukman. The film is highly regarded as a landmark film in the history of African cinema as it was made with a lavish budget of US$1.35 million, making it one of the biggest budgeted African films ever to be made. Against the backdrop of the colonial West Indies, which was under French imperialism, the drama was set on a slave ship. The film had its theatrical release in 1979.

== Cast ==
- Robert Liensol as The Parliamentarian
- Roland Bertin as Death
- Hélène Vincent as The Social Worker
- Philippe Clévenot as The Abbot
- Cyril Aventurin as The Father
- Fernand Berset as The Hotel Manager
- Gérard Bloncourt as Monsieur De la Pierre
- Toto Bissainthe as Sister Marie Joseph de Cluny
