= Les Bicots-nègres, vos voisins =

Les Bicots-nègres, vos voisins (Arabs and Niggers, Your Neighbours) is a 1974 French-Mauritanian film, written and directed by Med Hondo.

Les Bicots-nègres, vos voisins, a three-hour documentary, was Hondo's second feature-length film and his first colour feature. It opened with a 21-minute monologue in which a man, speaking directly to camera, expounded the history of cinematic representation in Africa. As in his debut film, Soleil O (1970), Hondo addressed the racism encountered by African immigrants in France, and the continuities between slavery and the postcolonial exploitation of migrant labour:

I wanted to show that these workers aren't eating anyone else's food, and that they hardly get what is theirs by right. And to show how they live, and what their problems are, their difficulties, their contradictions, all of them things that European workers know but poorly.

The film won the Gold Tanit at the 1974 Carthage Film Festival.
