= Fair Wind, "Blue Bird"! =

- Directed by: Mikhail Ershov
- Written by: Stanislava Borisavlevich; Fyodor Shkubonya; Yuri Printsev
- Starring: Blazhenka Catalinich; Radmila Karaklaich; Vitaly Doronin; Boris Amarantov
- Cinematography: V. Komarov, R. Luzhanin
- Edited by: Aleksandra Borovskaya
- Music by: Andrey Petrov
- Production company: Lenfilm
- Release date: 1967
- Running time: 76 minutes
- Countries: Soviet Union; Yugoslavia
- Languages: Russian; Serbo-Croatian

Fair Wind, "Blue Bird"! (Russian: Попутного ветра, «Синяя птица», romanized: Poputnogo vetra, «Sinyaya ptitsa») is a 1967 Soviet-Yugoslav children's adventure film directed by Mikhail Ershov, based on the eponymous story by Boris Kosier.

== Plot ==
Aboard the schooner "Blue Bird" traveling on the Adriatic are schoolchildren, winners of the questionnaire "For Peace and Mutual Understanding". Taking advantage of the fact that the ship, when entering the ports, is released from customs inspection, an international gang organizes the delivery of a consignment of drugs. Mrs. Rips, an observer from the Society for the Patronage of Animals and her companion, the circus Lorimur act as couriers.

A radio amateur from the US, schoolboy Ralph and his Yugoslav friend, Milan, consider the behavior of Monsieur Vilar, the pediatrician attached to the expedition, as very strange. The guys arrange for him to be followed until it turns out that the doctor is an agent of Interpol, and the real offender is Lorimur. After the refusal of Mrs. Rips to dine at the same table with a boy from Senegal, by decision of the general meeting, she is dropped off at the nearest port. The remaining companion is forced to request help from gangsters on the radio.

During the performance at an improvised concert, the guys search the artist's cabin and find the drugs hidden in paint tubes. Lorimur reaches the island on a lifeboat, but is captured by Ralph and Milan, who pursued him. The captain with the sailors and Monsieur Vilar arrives in time to arrest the fugitive, and later the gangster who appears behind the cargo.

== Cast ==
- Blazhenka Catalinić as Mrs. Rips
- Radmila Karaklajić as Gina Savić
- Vitaly Doronin as captain of the schooner "Blue Bird"
- Boris Amarantov as Lorimur (voiced by Alexander Demyanenko)
- Alexander Yesic as Monsieur Vilar
- Milan Puzic as lieutenant
- Demetr Bitents as correspondent (voiced by Oleg Basilashvili)
- Milenko Jovanović as Milan Petrović from Yugoslavia
- Evgenia Vetlov as Tanya Ivleva from the USSR
- Alexander Gavrilov as Ralph Barney from the United States
- Valery Komlev as Alec from Great Britain
- Vladimir Pak as Kyoto from Japan
- Larissa Taranenko as Ulla Nilsson from Sweden
- Azer Kurbanov as Pablo Gonzales from Brazil
- Robert Zotov as Thomas from Senegal
- Svetlana Vishnyakova as Tampiko from Japan
- Irina Shirokova as Mahraba from India
