= List of Japanese films of 1967 =

A list of films released in Japan in 1967 (see 1967 in film).

== List of films ==
Japanese films released in 1967
Title	Japanese Title	Release date	Director	Cast	Genre	Notes
	銀座100年	1967.__.__	Yukio Tomizawa			
	若者たち	1967.__.__	Tokihisa Morikawa			
	非行少女の日記	1967.__.__	Haruo Matsubara			
	性犯罪	1967.__.__	Kōji Wakamatsu			
	性の復活	1967.__.__	Osamu Yamashita			
	欲情の河	1967.__.__	Akitaka Kimata			
	不能者	1967.__.__	Satoru Kobayashi			
	乱行	1967.__.__	Kōji Wakamatsu			
	女のせい談	1967.__.__	Ario Takeda			
	愛欲の清算書	1967.__.__	Hideki Miki			
	熟れた感触	1967.__.__	Ario Takeda			
	犯して！犯して！大合戦	1967.__.__	Kan Mukai			
	好色妻	1967.__.__	Kinya Ogawa			
	好色番外地	1967.__.__	Kōji Seki			
	好色百科事典 セックス	1967.__.__	Osamu Yamashita			
	後家ごろし	1967.__.__	Seiichi Fukuda			
	個室のテクニック	1967.__.__	Kan Mukai			
	淫紋 処女妻姦通	1967.__.__	Kan Mukai			
	女体国際市場	1967.__.__	Kiyoshi Komori, Mamoru Watanabe			
	現代愛の事典 知りたい年頃	1967.__.__	Shinya Yamamoto			
	性本能と結婚	1967.__.__	Kinya Ogawa			
	整形処女	1967.__.__	Seiichi Fukuda			
	泥だらけの制服	1967.__.__	Kōe Shindō			
	寝上手	1967.__.__	Shinya Yamamoto			
	初もの 日本(秘)風俗史	1967.__.__	Kōe Shindō			
	刑法177条 婦女暴行男	1967.__.__	Kaoru Umezawa			
	真赤な獣欲	1967.__.__	Kaoru Umezawa			
	密通刑罰史	1967.__.__	Kiyoshi Komori			
	夜の百態	1967.__.__	Takeo Takagi			
	夜の千人斬	1967.__.__	Kaoru Umezawa			
	毒婦	1967.__.__	Hajime Sasaki			
The Bell	鐘	1967.__.__	Yukio Aoshima	Keitaro Miho, Keisuke Ishizu, Katsuhiko Matsunami		
	十八才の愛人	1967.01.__				
Discover Japan with the 5 Gents	社長千一夜	1967.01.01	Shue Matsubayashi	Hisaya Morishige, Keiju Kobayashi, Yoko Tsukasa		
Let's Go Young Guy!	レッツゴー！若大将	1967.01.01	Katsumi Iwauchi	Yuzo Kayami, Yuriko Hoshi, Chen Man Ling		
	妊婦と性病	1967.01.02	Kinya Ogawa			
	シンガポールの夜は更けて	1967.01.02	Hirokazu Ichimura			
Kyu-chan no Dekkai Yume	九ちゃんのでっかい夢	1967.01.02	Yoji Yamada			
	青春の海	1967.01.03	Shōgorō Nishimura			
	北国の旅情	1967.01.03	Katsumi Nishikawa			
Nakano Spy School: Assignment Dragon Number Three	陸軍中野学校 竜三号指令	1967.01.03	Tokuzō Tanaka			
Zatoichi's Cane Sword	座頭市鉄火旅	1967.01.03	Kimiyoshi Yasuda	Shintaro Katsu, Shiho Fujimura, Eijirō Tōno	Jidai-geki / Chambara	
	愛情開眼	1967.01.07	Saburō Kyōdō			
	いたづら	1967.01.13	Shinya Yamamoto			
	暗黒街シリーズ 荒っぽいのは御免出せ	1967.01.14	Masaharu Segawa			
	宴	1967.01.14	Heinosuke Gosho			
	限りある日を愛に生きて	1967.01.14	Shigeo Tanaka			
	残侠あばれ肌	1967.01.14	Kiyoshi Saeki			
	雪の喪章	1967.01.14	Kenji Misumi			
	不死身なあいつ	1967.01.14	Buichi Saitō			
Yume wa Yoru Hiraku	夢は夜ひらく	1967.01.14	Haruyasu Noguchi		Yakuza	
Industrial Spy Free-For-All	クレージーだよ 天下無敵	1967.01.14	Takashi Tsuboshima	Hitoshi Ueki, Kei Tani, Yumiko Nogawa	Comedy	
Mahjong Madness	喜劇 駅前満貫	1967.01.14	Kozo Saeki	Hisaya Morishige, Junzaburo Ban, Frankie Sakai		
Lost Spring	惜春	1967.01.14	Noboru Nakamura	Michiyo Aratama, Mariko Kaga		
	みだれ髪	1967.01.21	Satoru Kobayashi			
	狙う	1967.01.21	Giichi Nishihara			
	あの試走車を狙え	1967.01.28	Kazuo Mori			
Chilvarous Story of Japan: Sharp Sake Goblet	日本侠客伝 白刃の盃	1967.01.28	Masahiro Makino		Yakuza	
Gambling Den	博奕打ち	1967.01.28	Shigehiro Ozawa		Yakuza	
	夜の罠	1967.01.28	Sōkichi Tomimoto			
	ダブル処女	1967.01.29	Shintarō Kishi, Hideki Miki			
	乳房の香り	1967.01.29	Satomi Kawashima			
	現代の恐怖	1967.01.31	Fumihiro Ito			
	縄と乳房	1967.01.31	Ichirō Kyōdō, Shintarō Kishi			
	戯れ	1967.02.__	Osamu Yamashita			
	産婦人科日記より 芸者	1967.02.__	Kōji Seki			
	残忍	1967.02.__	Kiyoshi Komori			
	恍惚の夜	1967.02.__	Taira Takano			
New Crest of a Man: The Young Boss	新男の紋章 若親分誕生	1967.02.04	Motomu Ida		Yakuza	
	太平洋戦史 世紀の爪跡	1967.02.04				
Indianapolis Car Race	インディレース 爆走	1967.02.04	Hiroshi Teshigahara		Documentary	
A Colt Is My Passport	拳銃は俺のパスポート	1967.02.04	Takashi Nomura	Joe Shishido, Chitose Kobayashi, Jerry Fujio	Yakuza	
The Age of Assassins	殺人狂時代	1967.02.04	Kihachi Okamoto	Tatsuya Nakadai, Reiko Dan, Hideo Sunazuka		
	寝もの踊り	1967.02.06	Kan Kataoka			
	真夜中の花園	1967.02.06	Takeo Takagi			
	香江花月夜 Hong Kong Nocturne	1967.02.08	Umetsugu Inoue			
	ラーメン大使	1967.02.11	Kōji Shima			
Young Boss 6	若親分を消せ	1967.02.11	Chūzō Nakanishi		Yakuza	
	日没前に愛して	1967.02.11	Kazuo Hase			
	白昼の惨殺	1967.02.11	Meijirō Umetsu			
	落語野郎 大爆笑	1967.02.11	Toshio Sugie			
International Secret Police: The Killing Bottle	国際秘密警察 絶体絶命	1967.02.11	Senkichi Taniguchi	Tatsuya Mihashi, Kumi Mizuno, Nick Adams		
	密室の抱擁	1967.02.14	Ario Takeda			
	北北海道	1967.02.15	Michio Mori			
Band of Ninja	忍者武芸帳	1967.02.15	Nagisa Ōshima		Jidai-geki / Ninja	
Thirst for Love	愛の渇き	1967.02.18	Koreyoshi Kurahara	Ruriko Asaoka, Nobuo Nakamura, Tetsuo Ishitachi		
	千曲川絶唱	1967.02.19	Shirō Toyoda			
	情欲の黒水仙	1967.02.21	Kōji Wakamatsu			
	避妊革命	1967.02.21	Masao Adachi			
	雌が雄を喰い殺す かまきり	1967.02.23	Umetsugu Inoue			
Sing a Song of Sex	日本春歌考	1967.02.23	Nagisa Oshima	Ichirō Araki, Akiko Koyama, Kazuyoshi Kushida		
	伊豆の踊子	1967.02.25	Hideo Onchi			
	星よ嘆くな 勝利の男	1967.02.25	Toshio Masuda			
Organized Violence	組織暴力	1967.02.25	Junya Satō		Yakuza	
Sentenced to 18 Years	懲役十八年	1967.02.25	Tai Katō		Yakuza	
Tokyo Gambler	東京博徒	1967.02.25	Kimiyoshi Yasuda		Yakuza	
	二人の銀座	1967.02.25	Noboru Kaji			
Yakuza Soldier: In Charge of Himself	兵隊やくざ 俺にまかせろ	1967.02.25	Tokuzō Tanaka		Yakuza	
	禁断の情事	1967.02.28	Kinya Ogawa			
	あやまち	1967.03.__	Seiichi Fukuda			
	激しい関係	1967.03.__	Kaoru Umezawa			
	手さぐり	1967.03.__	Kinya Ogawa			
	情事の階段	1967.03.__	Haruo Matsubara			
	色の手配師	1967.03.__	Osamu Yamashita			
	網の中の暴行	1967.03.__	Kōji Wakamatsu			
Violated Angels	犯された白衣	1967.03.__	Kōji Wakamatsu		Pink	
	泥だけの制服	1967.03.07	Kōe Shindō			
	夜の悦び	1967.03.07	Kan Mukai			
Hanafuda Tosei	花札渡世	1967.03.10	Masashige Narusawa			
Otoko no Shobu Nio no Irezumi	男の勝負 仁王の刺青	1967.03.10	Noribumi Suzuki		Yakuza	
	あゝ君が愛	1967.03.11	Yoshitarō Nomura			
	夜霧よ今夜も有難う	1967.03.11	Mio Ezaki			
	恋のハイウエイ	1967.03.11	Buichi Saitō			
	恋をしようよ カリブの花	1967.03.11	Mamoru Miyazaki			
Bakumatsu: Tenamonya Dai Sodo	てなもんや大騒動	1967.03.12	Kengo Furusawa		Jidai-geki	
	続・何処へ	1967.03.12	Shirō Moritani			
	女の責め	1967.03.14	Shinya Yamamoto			
	素肌の罠	1967.03.14	Kaoru Umezawa			
Gamera vs. Gyaos	大怪獣空中戦 ガメラ対ギャオス	1967.03.15	Noriyaki Yuasa		Science fiction	
	たぬきさん大当り	1967.03.19	George M. Reid, Masao Kumakawa			
	少年ジャックと魔法使い	1967.03.19	Yasuji Yabushita			
	マグマ大使	1967.03.19	Keinosuke Tsuchiya			
Cyborg 009: Monster War	サイボーグ009 怪獣戦争	1967.03.19	Yugo Serikawa			
	花の色道	1967.03.21	Kinya Ogawa			
	一寸法師	1967.03.25	Katsuo Takahashi			
	銀の長靴	1967.03.25	Hirokazu Ichimura			
	陽のあたる坂道	1967.03.25	Katsumi Nishikawa			
The X from Outer Space	宇宙大怪獣ギララ	1967.03.25	Kazui Nihonmatsu	Shunya Wazaki, Itoko Harada, Shinichi Yanagisawa		
	いそがしい肉体	1967.03.28	Haruo Matsubara			
	泣き濡れた情事	1967.03.28	Giichi Nishihara			
	昼下がりの逢びき	1967.03.28	Kan Mukai			
	日本の北洋漁船	1967.04.01	Minoru Tanaka			
	解散式	1967.04.01	Kinji Fukasaku			
Kojiro	佐々木小次郎	1967.04.01	Hiroshi Inagaki		Jidai-geki	
Game of Chance 2	続浪曲子守唄	1967.04.01	Ryūichi Takamori		Yakuza	
	坊ちゃん社員 青春は俺のものだ！	1967.04.01	Takeshi Matsumori			
	スペシャル	1967.04.__	Kōji Seki			
	泣きどころ	1967.04.__	Kinya Ogawa			
	処女ざくら	1967.04.__	Toshio Moriwaki			
	処女の烙印	1967.04.__	Kaoru Umezawa			
	(秘)女狩り	1967.04.__	Akitaka Kimata			
	情夫と情婦	1967.04.__	Mamoru Watanabe			
	新・情事の履歴書	1967.04.__	Osamu Yamashita			
	美女拷問	1967.04.__	Kiyoshi Komori			
	歪んだ情欲	1967.04.__	Haruo Matsubara			
	女のよろこび	1967.04.07	宇礼始			
Living by the Sword	秩父水滸伝 影を斬る剣	1967.04.08	Motomu Ida			
	命しらずのあいつ	1967.04.08	Akinori Matsuo			
	女あさり	1967.04.15	Kan Mukai			
	バラ色の二人	1967.04.15	Hideo Sakurai			
	喜劇 駅前学園	1967.04.15	Kazuo Inoue			
	妻二人	1967.04.15	Yasuzō Masumura			
	若社長大奮戦	1967.04.15	Meijirō Umetsu			
	落語野郎 大泥棒	1967.04.15	Shūe Matsubayashi			
	古都憂愁 姉いもうと	1967.04.15	Kenji Misumi			
Aru mittsu "Bi to shu"	或る密通	1967.04.15	Kan Mukai, Shin'ya Yamamoto (director), Koji Wakamatsu	Mitsugu Jujii, Michiyo Mako, Hiroshi Nikaido		
Tasuke Isshin: Edo Festival	一心太助 江戸っ子祭り	1967.04.20	Kōsaku Yamashita		Jidai-geki	
Abashiri Prison: Duel at 30 Below Zero	網走番外地 決斗零下30度	1967.04.20	Teruo Ishii		Yakuza	
	激情の乳房	1967.04.22	Kan Kataoka			
	夫婦生態白書より 夜泣く女	1967.04.22	Kōe Shindō			
Gappa: The Triphibian Monster	大巨獣ガッパ	1967.04.22	Haruyasu Noguchi		Science fiction	
	諜網嬌娃 Operation Lipstick	1967.04.27	Umetsugu Inoue			
A Certain Killer	ある殺し屋	1967.04.29	Kazuo Mori		Crime	
	クレージー黄金作戦	1967.04.29	Takashi Tsuboshima			
	にせ刑事	1967.04.29	Satsuo Yamamoto			
	愛の讃歌	1967.04.29	Yōji Yamada			
	春日和	1967.04.29	Hideo Ōba			
	鶴と白鳥と流氷の故郷	1967.04.29	井口光夫			
	現代女性医学	1967.05.01	Kinya Ogawa			
	無軌道女性	1967.05.01	Haruo Matsubara			
	あばずれの悦楽	1967.05.__	Satoru Kobayashi			
	処女未練	1967.05.__	Kan Mukai			
Kyokaku-Do	侠客道	1967.05.03	Noribumi Suzuki			
	燃える雲	1967.05.03	Takashi Nomura			
Gambling Den: Lone Dragon	博奕打ち 一匹竜	1967.05.03	Shigehiro Ozawa		Yakuza	
	嵐来たり去る	1967.05.03	Toshio Masuda			
	不毛の愛欲	1967.05.09	Osamu Yamashita			
	乱れた関係	1967.05.09	Giichi Nishihara			
	さそり	1967.05.13	Junzō Mizukawa			
Samurai Wolf: Hell Cut	牙狼之介 地獄斬り	1967.05.13	Hideo Gosha		Jidai-geki	
	今夜は踊ろう	1967.05.13	Tarō Yuge			
	若い時計台	1967.05.13	Akira Inoue			
The Affair	情炎	1967.05.13	Yoshishige Yoshida	Mariko Okada, Yoshie Minami, Tadahiko Sugano		
	札つき処女	1967.05.16	Masanao Sakao			
	女子寮	1967.05.16	Kan Mukai			
Honor Among Brothers 4	兄弟仁義 続・関東三兄弟	1967.05.20	Kōsaku Yamashita		Yakuza	
Otoshimae	決着	1967.05.20	Teruo Ishii			
	続・名もなく貧しく美しく 父と子	1967.05.20	Zenzō Matsuyama			
	坊ちゃん社員 青春でつっ走れ！	1967.05.20	Takeshi Matsumori			
	夕陽が泣いている	1967.05.20	Kenjirō Morinaga			
	恋人をさがそう	1967.05.20	Kenjirō Morinaga			
	続悪徳医 女医篇	1967.05.23	Seiichi Fukuda			
	ゴメスの名はゴメス・流砂	1967.05.27	Osamu Takahashi			
	若社長レインボー作戦	1967.05.27	Meijirō Umetsu			
	早射ち犬	1967.05.27	Tetsutarō Murano			
Samurai Rebellion	上意討ち 拝領妻始末	1967.05.27	Masaki Kobayashi	Toshirō Mifune, Tatsuya Nakadai, Yoko Tsukasa	Jidai-geki	
	生首情痴事件	1967.05.31	Kinya Ogawa			
	飛騨	1967.06.03	八幡省三			
	あゝ同期の桜	1967.06.03	Sadao Nakajima		WWII	
	喜劇 急行列車	1967.06.03	Masaharu Segawa			
	君が青春のとき	1967.06.03	Buichi Saitō			
	続社長千一夜	1967.06.03	Shūe Matsubayashi			
	非行少年 陽の出の叫び	1967.06.03	Shigeya Fujita			
Portrait of Chieko	智恵子抄	1967.06.05	Noboru Nakamura	Tetsuro Tamba, Shima Iwashita, Eiji Okada		
	ひき裂かれた盛装	1967.06.10	Tokuzō Tanaka			
	砂糖菓子が壊れるとき	1967.06.10	Tadashi Imai			
	人妻椿	1967.06.10	Hirokazu Ichimura			
	鞭と肌	1967.06.11	Shintarō Kishi			
	花を喰う蟲	1967.06.15	Shōgorō Nishimura			
Branded to Kill	殺しの烙印	1967.06.15	Seijun Suzuki	Joe Shishido, Koji Nanbara, Isao Tamagawa	Yakuza	
Life of Bad Reputation	悪名一代	1967.06.17	Kimiyoshi Yasuda		Yakuza	
Otoko Namida no Hamonjo	男涙の波門状	1967.06.17	Kōsaku Yamashita			
Japan's Dark History: Blood Feud	日本暗黒史 血の抗争	1967.06.17	Eiichi Kudō		Yakuza	
Nakano Spy School: Top Secret Command	陸軍中野学校 密命	1967.06.17	Akira Inoue			
	ひめごと	1967.06.24	Takeo Takagi			
	若い刺激	1967.06.24	Ario Takeda			
	地獄の愛撫	1967.06.24	Jirō Tsurumaki			
	恍惚の泉	1967.06.24	Shinya Yamamoto			
	四国・自然と伝統	1967.06.25	Genichirō Higuchi			
A Man Vanishes	人間蒸発	1967.06.25	Shōhei Imamura	Shōhei Imamura		
Kanto Moko Gozansu	関東も広うござんす	1967.06.28	Haruyasu Noguchi, Kazunari Takeda			
	性の起原	1967.06.28	Kaneto Shindō			
	堕落する女	1967.06.28	Kōzaburō Yoshimura			
	爆弾男といわれるあいつ	1967.06.28	Yasuharu Hasebe			
Zoku Soshiki Boryoku	続組織暴力	1967.06.29	Junya Satō		Yakuza	
The North Sea Chivalry	北海遊侠伝	1967.06.29	Ryūichi Takamori		Yakuza	
	その人は昔	1967.07.01	Zenzō Matsuyama			
	南太平洋の若大将	1967.07.01	Kengo Furusawa			
	女高生の絶叫	1967.07.__	Kaoru Umezawa			
	女の味	1967.07.__	Toshio Okuwaki			
	日本暴行暗黒史 異常者の血	1967.07.__	Kōji Wakamatsu			
	完全なる結婚	1967.07.02	Shinya Yamamoto			
	いろの道づれ	1967.07.02	Kan Mukai			
	終りなき生命を	1967.07.08	Kenji Yoshida			
Gambling Den: Game of Immortality	博奕打ち 不死身の勝負	1967.07.08	Shigehiro Ozawa		Yakuza	
Brutal Tales of Chivalry 4: Blood Stained Tattoo	昭和残侠伝 血染の唐獅子	1967.07.08	Masahiro Makino		Yakuza	
	快楽の罠	1967.07.11	Kinnosuke Fukada			
	蛇淫	1967.07.11	Seiichi Fukuda			
	女の媚態	1967.07.11	Shinya Yamamoto			
	肉体の誘惑	1967.07.11	Giichi Nishihara			
Slave Widow	奴隷未亡人	1967.07.11	Mamoru Watanabe	Noriko Tatsumi; Naomi Tani	Pink	
Woman Gambler 2	女賭博師	1967.07.15	Tarō Yuge		Yakuza	
Sleepy Eyes of Death: A Trail of Traps	眠狂四郎無頼控 魔性の肌	1967.07.15	Kazuo Ikehiro		Jidai-geki	
	処女の血脈	1967.07.18	Osamu Yamashita			
	女体蒸発	1967.07.18	Seiichi Fukuda			
	女たちの庭	1967.07.19	Yoshitarō Nomura			
	大番頭小番頭	1967.07.19	Michiyoshi Doi			
	トッポ・ジージョのボタン戦争	1967.07.20	Kon Ichikawa			
	ひょっこりひょうたん島	1967.07.21	Yasuji Yabushita			
	黄金バット	1967.07.21	若林忠雄			
	魔法使いサリー	1967.07.21	Yoshikata Nitta, Hiroshi Ikeda			
	キャプテンウルトラ	1967.07.21	Kōichi Takemoto, Hajime Satō			
King Kong Escapes	キングコングの逆襲	1967.07.22	Ishirō Honda	Akira Takarada, Rhodes Reason, Mie Hama		
Ultraman	ウルトラマン	1967.07.22	Hajime Tsuburaya	Susumu Kurobe, Ikichi Ishii, Hiroko Sakurai		
	悪魔からの勲章	1967.07.29	Mitsuo Murayama			
	痴人の愛	1967.07.29	Yasuzō Masumura			
The Shogun and his Mistresses	大奥(秘)物語	1967.07.30	Sadao Nakajima		Jidai-geki	
The World of Gamblers	渡世人	1967.07.30	Kiyoshi Saeki		Yakuza	
	若妻の匂い	1967.08.01	Kan Kataoka			
	受胎	1967.08.01	Akitaka Kimata			
	性の三悪	1967.08.01	Kinya Ogawa			
	七人の野獣	1967.08.01	Mio Ezaki			
	反逆	1967.08.01	Akinori Matsuo			
	原色の世代 脱がされた制服	1967.08.__	Hajime Sasaki			
	激しい交歓	1967.08.__	Kaoru Umezawa			
	処女のためいき	1967.08.__	Takeo Takagi			
	ネッキング	1967.08.__	Toshio Okuwaki			
Japan's Longest Day	日本のいちばん長い日	1967.08.03	Kihachi Okamoto	Seiji Miyaguchi, Rokkō Toura, Chishū Ryū	WWII	
	おヘソで勝負	1967.08.05	Kōji Seki			
	肉刑	1967.08.05	Kiyoshi Komori			
	なにはなくとも 全員集合！！	1967.08.05	Yūsuke Watanabe			
	喜劇一発勝負	1967.08.05	Yōji Yamada			
	ピンクの挑発	1967.08.11	Kōe Shindō			
	若い女に手を出すな	1967.08.11	Takeo Takagi			
	柔肌しぐれ	1967.08.11	Ryō Hida			
	皇太子同妃両殿下の南米ご訪問	1967.08.12				
	喜劇 東京の田舎ッぺ	1967.08.12	Kōji Chino			
Honor Among Brothers 5	兄弟仁義 関東命知らず	1967.08.12	Kōsaku Yamashita		Yakuza	
Young Boss: Fugitive	若親分兇状旅	1967.08.12	Kazuo Mori		Yakuza	
	波止場の鷹	1967.08.12	Shōgorō Nishimura			
Abashiri Prison: Fight Against Vice	網走番外地 悪への挑戦	1967.08.12	Teruo Ishii		Yakuza	
	銀河系	1967.08.12	Masao Adachi			
Zatoichi the Outlaw	座頭市牢破り	1967.08.12	Satsuo Yamamoto	Shintaro Katsu, Rentarō Mikuni, Kō Nishimura	Jidai-geki / Chambara	
	日本人の誇り 出光丸	1967.08.15	Minoru Tanaka, Ryō Takeuchi			
	激流	1967.08.19	Umetsugu Inoue			
	恋のメキシカンロック 恋と夢の冒険	1967.08.19	Hideo Sakurai			
	赤い肉	1967.08.20	Ryō Hida			
	桃色電話	1967.08.26	Giichi Nishihara			
Gang Emperor	ギャングの帝王	1967.08.26	Yasuo Furuhata		Yakuza	
	ザ・スパイダースのゴーゴー向う見ず作戦	1967.08.26	Buichi Saitō			
	花と果実	1967.08.26	Kenjirō Morinaga			
Naniwa Kyokaku Dokyo Shichinin Giri	浪花侠客伝 度胸七人斬り	1967.08.26	Shigehiro Ozawa			
	河 あの裏切りが重く	1967.08.31	Kōta Mori			
	ダブル・エッチ	1967.09.__	Toshio Okuwaki			
	強烈な･･･青い穴	1967.09.__	Kaoru Umezawa			
	女子大生の禁じられた花園	1967.09.02	Kinya Ogawa			
	夜のただれ	1967.09.02	Shinya Yamamoto			
	てなもんや幽霊道中	1967.09.02	Shūe Matsubayashi			
	監獄への招待	1967.09.02	Akira Inoue			
	喜劇 駅前探検	1967.09.02	Kazuo Inoue			
	夜のひとで	1967.09.02	Kazuo Hase			
Japanese Summer: Double Suicide	無理心中日本の夏	1967.09.02	Nagisa Oshima	Keiko Sakurai, Kei Satō, Rokko Toura		
	異常体験白書 女体整形	1967.09.04	Kan Mukai			
Showdown	対決	1967.09.06	Toshio Masuda		Yakuza	
Massacre Gun	みな殺しの拳銃	1967.09.06	Yasuharu Hasebe	Joe Shishido, Tatsuya Fuji, Jirō Okazaki	Yakuza	
	ハダカで今晩は	1967.09.12	Takeo Takagi			
	毒牙	1967.09.12	Osamu Yamashita			
	骨ぬき	1967.09.12	Seiichi Fukuda			
	性の放浪	1967.09.12	Kōji Wakamatsu			
	喜劇 大風呂敷	1967.09.14	Kō Nakahira			
	錆びたペンダント	1967.09.14	Mio Ezaki			
	若い力	1967.09.15	Masami Iwashita			
	でっかい太陽	1967.09.15	Takeshi Matsumori			
	海のGメン 太平洋の用心棒	1967.09.15	Shigeo Tanaka			
Chilvarous Story of Japan: Sword Attack	日本侠客伝 斬り込み	1967.09.15	Masahiro Makino		Yakuza	
Yakuza Soldier: Attack!	兵隊やくざ 殴り込み	1967.09.15	Tokuzō Tanaka		Yakuza	
	柳ケ瀬ブルース	1967.09.15	Shinji Murayama			
	颱風とざくろ	1967.09.15	Eizō Sugawa			
	喜劇 競馬必勝法	1967.09.18	Masaharu Segawa			
Otoko no Shobu: Kanto Arashi	男の勝負 関東嵐	1967.09.18	Kōsaku Yamashita		Yakuza	
	汚れ	1967.09.19	Shinya Yamamoto			
	恥かしい技巧	1967.09.19	Kan Mukai			
	斜陽のおもかげ	1967.09.23	Kōsei Saitō			
	夕笛	1967.09.23	Katsumi Nishikawa			
	あかね雲	1967.09.30	Masahiro Shinoda			
	育ちざかり	1967.09.30	Shirō Moritani			
	純情二重奏	1967.09.30	Meijirō Umetsu			
Woman Gambler 3	女賭場荒し	1967.09.30	Tarō Yuge		Yakuza	
	毒薬の匂う女	1967.09.30	Sōkichi Tomimoto			
Eyes, the Sea and a Ball	なつかしき笛や太鼓	1967.09.30	Keisuke Kinoshita	Yoko Tsukasa, Tadao Takashima, Kiyoshi Kodama		
	悪道庵十年	1967.10.__	Mamoru Watanabe, Shinya Yamamoto			
	荒野のダッチワイフ	1967.10.03	Atsushi Yamatoya			
	処女残酷	1967.10.03	Mamoru Watanabe			
	性犯	1967.10.03	Kinya Ogawa			
	猟色	1967.10.03	Kan Kataoka			
	東京ナイト	1967.10.07	Noboru Kaji			
Velvet Hustler	紅の流れ星	1967.10.07	Toshio Masuda	Tetsuya Watari, Ruriko Asaoka, Kayo Matsuo	Crime	
Kyokaku no Okite	侠客の掟	1967.10.10	Motohiro Torii			
Zenigata Heiji	銭形平次	1967.10.10	Tetsuya Yamanouchi		Jidai-geki	
	狂ったいとなみ	1967.10.13	Hajime Sasaki			
	青春の悦楽	1967.10.13	Akitaka Kimata			
	暴欲の色布団	1967.10.13	Mamoru Watanabe			
	生きている海岸線	1967.10.14	秋山智弘			
	また逢う日まで 恋人の泉	1967.10.14	Mamoru Miyazaki			
	レッツゴー！高校レモン娘	1967.10.14	Hirokazu Ichimura			
	勝負犬	1967.10.14	Yoshio Inoue			
	脱獄者	1967.10.14	Kazuo Ikehiro			
	肉地獄	1967.10.17	Haruo Matsubara			
	売女（ばいた）	1967.10.17	Kōji Seki			
	東京ユニバーシヤード	1967.10.18	Motoi Ogasawara			
	青春太郎	1967.10.18	Kō Nakahira			
	爆笑野郎 大事件	1967.10.18	Hideo Suzuki			
	奥の細道	1967.10.20	岸光男			
The Wife of Seishu Hanaoka	華岡青洲の妻	1967.10.20	Yasuzo Masumura	Raizo Ichikawa, Ayako Wakao, Hideko Takamine	Jidai-geki	
	七人の野獣 血の宣言	1967.10.21	Mio Ezaki			
Game of Chance 3	出世子守唄	1967.10.21	Ryūichi Takamori		Yakuza	
Sentenced to 18 Years: Paroled from Prison	懲役十八年 仮出獄	1967.10.21	Yasuo Furuhata		Yakuza	
	爆破3秒前	1967.10.21	Motomu Ida			
	おんな泣かせ	1967.10.24	Masanao Sakao			
	雌が雄を喰い殺す 三匹のかまきり	1967.10.26	Umetsugu Inoue			
	濡れた逢びき	1967.10.26	Yōichi Maeda			
	女体残虐図	1967.10.28	Masanao Sakao			
	色罠	1967.10.28	Kan Kataoka			
	クレージーの怪盗ジバコ	1967.10.28	Takashi Tsuboshima			
	ドリフターズですよ！前進前進また前進	1967.10.28	Yoshinori Wada			
Namida-gawa	なみだ川	1967.10.28	Kenji Misumi		Jidai-geki	
The Chivalrous Life	侠骨一代	1967.11.01	Masahiro Makino		Yakuza	
The Women Around the Shogun	続大奥(秘)物語	1967.11.01	Sadao Nakajima		Jidai-geki	
Kimi wa Koibito	君は恋人	1967.11.03	Buichi Saitō		Yakuza	
	赤木圭一郎は生きている 激流に生きる男	1967.11.03	Kenji Yoshida			
	リンチと縛り	1967.11.07	Shintarō Kishi			
	続・みだれ髪 肌色じかけ	1967.11.07	Seiichi Fukuda			
	稲妻	1967.11.11	Hideo Ōba			
	女の一生	1967.11.11	Yoshitarō Nomura			
	喜劇 団体列車	1967.11.12	Masaharu Segawa			
	旅路	1967.11.12	Shinji Murayama		Jidai-geki	
	処女証明書	1967.11.14	Kan Mukai			
	日本性犯罪史 通り魔	1967.11.14	Osamu Yamashita			
Hoodlum Priest	やくざ坊主	1967.11.15	Kimiyoshi Yasuda		Jidai-geki	
Woman Gambler 4	三匹の女賭博師	1967.11.15	Shigeo Tanaka		Yakuza	
	青春鼓王 King Drummer	1967.11.16	Umetsugu Inoue			
	喜劇 駅前百年	1967.11.18	Shirō Toyoda			
The Endless Duel	血斗	1967.11.18	Toshio Masuda			
	東京市街戦	1967.11.18	Shōgorō Nishimura			
Scattered Clouds	乱れ雲	1967.11.18	Mikio Naruse	Yūzō Kayama, Yoko Tsukasa, Mitsuko Mari	Drama	
	ダブルドッキング	1967.11.21	Shintarō Kishi, Toshiya Fujita			
	異常な反応 悶絶	1967.11.21	Giichi Nishihara			
	惨奇 性体実験	1967.11.21	Kiyoshi Komori			
The World of Gamblers Pt. 2	続渡世人	1967.11.23	Kiyoshi Saeki		Yakuza	
	任侠魚河岸の石松	1967.11.23	Noribumi Suzuki		Yakuza	
	めすおすの本能	1967.12.01	Kinya Ogawa			
	多情な乳液	1967.12.01	Ario Takeda			
	炎と女	1967.12.01	Yoshishige Yoshida			
Kawachi Chivalry	河内遊侠伝	1967.12.01	Ryūichi Takamori		Yakuza	
Gambler's Three	三人の博徒	1967.12.01	Shigehiro Ozawa		Yakuza	
	囁きのジョー	1967.12.01	Kōichi Saitō			
	沖縄	1967.12.__	Tsuyoshi Kurosawa			
	牝罠	1967.12.__	Giichi Nishihara			
	続日本暴行暗黒史 暴虐魔	1967.12.__	Kōji Wakamatsu			
A Killer's Key	ある殺し屋の鍵	1967.12.02	Kazuo Mori		Crime	
Zankyo no Sakazuki	残侠の盃	1967.12.02	Tokuzō Tanaka		Yakuza	
	変質者	1967.12.05	Shinya Yamamoto			
	スキー野郎 氷河大滑降	1967.12.06	Kenji Fukuhara			
	燃えろ！太陽	1967.12.06	Takeshi Matsumori			
	父子草	1967.12.06	Seiji Maruyama			
	愛は惜しみなく	1967.12.09	Kenjirō Morinaga			
Kanto Prison Return	関東刑務所帰り	1967.12.09	Kazunari Takeda		Yakuza	
	濡れ場	1967.12.11	Masanao Sakao			
	浮気妻	1967.12.11	Kōe Shindō			
	君に幸福を センチメンタル・ボーイ	1967.12.16	Seiji Maruyama			
Eleven Samurai	十一人の侍	1967.12.16	Eiichi Kudō		Jidai-geki	
	夜の縄張り	1967.12.16	Tetsutarō Murano			
Son of Godzilla	怪獣島の決戦 ゴジラの息子	1967.12.16	Jun Fukuda	Tadao Takashima, Akira Kubo	Science fiction	
	穴	1967.12.19				
	黄金の野郎ども	1967.12.23	Mio Ezaki			
	花の宴	1967.12.23	Hirokazu Ichimura			
	喜劇 ニューヨーク帰りの田舎ッぺ	1967.12.23	Kōji Chino			
Honor Among Brothers 6	兄弟仁義 関東兄貴分	1967.12.23	Sadao Nakajima		Yakuza	
	男なら振りむくな	1967.12.23	Yoshitarō Nomura			
Abashiri Prison: Battle in a Blizzard	網走番外地 吹雪の斗争	1967.12.23	Teruo Ishii		Yakuza	
	黄色い太陽	1967.12.26				
	変態魔	1967.12.26	Kōji Seki			
	夜明けの国	1967.12.28	Toshie Tokieda			
Young Boss: The Flesh Worth 1000 Ryo	若親分千両肌	1967.12.30	Kazuo Ikehiro		Yakuza	
Zatoichi Challenged	座頭市血煙り街道	1967.12.30	Kenji Misumi	Shintaro Katsu, Jushiro Konoe, Miwa Takada	Jidai-geki / Chambara	
	ゴー！ゴー！若大将	1967.12.31	Katsuki Iwauchi			
	日本一の男の中の男	1967.12.31	Kengo Furusawa			

== See also ==
- 1967 in Japan
- 1967 in Japanese television
