= François Catonné =

French cinematographer

François Catonné is a French cinematographer. He won the 1993 César Award for Best Cinematography for his work on Indochine. In 2011, he met the painter Vladimir Veličković with whom he decided to make a film. Since then, he has been making documentaries about painters with the principle of filming only in the artist's studio and showing him at work. He has already made ten and continues this work.

== Selected filmography ==
| Year | Title | Director | Notes |
|---|---|---|---|
| 2014 | Ablations | Arnold de Parscau | |
| 2010 | The Clink of Ice | Bertrand Blier | |
| 2005 | How Much Do You Love Me? | Bertrand Blier | |
| 2004 | Colette, une femme libre | Nadine Trintignant | Miniseries |
| 2000 | Les Acteurs | Bertrand Blier | |
| 1997 | Messieurs les enfants | Pierre Boutron | |
| 1995 | A French Woman | Régis Wargnier | |
| 1992 | Indochine | Régis Wargnier | |
| 1985 | Sac de nœuds | Josiane Balasko | |
| 1983 | For Those I Loved | Robert Enrico | |
| 1970 | Soleil Ô | Med Hondo | |
