= Give a Paw, Friend! =

- Russian: Дай лапу, Друг!
- Directed by: Ilya Gurin
- Written by: Yuri German
- Starring: Olga Bobkova; Valentina Belyaeva; Nikolay Lebedev; Yuriy Sarantsev; Aleksandr Sokolov
- Cinematography: Bentsion Monastyrsky
- Edited by: Lidiya Zhuchkova
- Music by: Mark Fradkin
- Release date: 1967
- Running time: 68 minute
- Country: Soviet Union
- Language: Russian

Give a Paw, Friend! (Russian: Дай лапу, Друг!) is a 1967 Soviet family film directed by Ilya Gurin.

== Plot ==
The film tells about a girl, a girl, Tanya, and her faithful dog, nicknamed Friend, who always comes to her aid and does not leave her when she gets sick...

== Cast ==
- Olga Bobkova
- Valentina Belyaeva
- Nikolay Lebedev
- Yuriy Sarantsev
- Aleksandr Sokolov
- Lev Lyubetskiy
- Aleksei Smirnov
- Varvara Shurkhovetskaya
