= Antonio Eceiza =

Spanish film director

- Born: 14 September 1935; San Sebastián, Spain
- Died: 15 November 2011 (aged 76)
- Occupations: Film director Screenwriter
- Years active: 1960–1995

Antonio Eceiza (14 September 1935 – 15 November 2011) was a Spanish film director and screenwriter. He directed eleven films between 1960 and 1995. He is notable for promoting the growth of Basque cinema. His 1977 film Mina, Wind of Freedom was entered into the 10th Moscow International Film Festival.

== Filmography ==
- Día de paro (1960)
- A través de San Sebastián (1960)
- A través del fútbol (1962)
- The Innocents (1963 - screenwriter)
- Último encuentro (1967)
- El próximo otoño (1967)
- De cuerpo presente (1967)
- Las secretas intenciones (1970)
- Mina, viento de libertad (1977)
- El complot mongol (1978)
- Ke arteko egunak (1990)
- Felicidades Tovarich (1995)
