= Nous aurons toute la mort pour dormir =

1977 Franco–Mauritanian Documentary

- Directed by: Med Hondo
- Written by: Med Hondo
- Produced by: Les Films du Soleil Ô
- Cinematography: Jean Monsigny
- Edited by: Youcef Tobni; Hamid Djellouli
- Distributed by: Les Films du Soleil Ô
- Release date: 23 March 1977 (France)
- Running time: 160 min.
- Countries: France; Mauritania
- Language: French

Nous aurons toute la mort pour dormir (We will have all death to sleep), is a 1977 Franco–Mauritanian documentary film directed by Med Hondo and produced for Les Films du Soleil Ô.

The film was shot for 4 months from December 25, 1975 to March 5, 1976, in the area of the former Spanish Sahara. The film deals with the armed struggle of Polisario Front in Western Sahara against Spain colonization. The film received positive reviews from critics and was screened at Berlin International Film Festival of West Germany in June 1977.
