= Boris Amarantov =

Soviet actor (1940–1987)

- Борис Амарантов
- Born: 19 September 1940; Moscow USSR
- Died: 3 March 1987 (aged 46); Moscow, RSFSR, USSR
- Occupation(s): actor, director, mime
- Years active: 1962–1987

Boris Georgievich Amarantov (Russian: Бори́с Гео́ргиевич Амара́нтов; September 19, 1940 – March 3, 1987) was a Soviet variety actor and director.

== Early life ==
Amarantov was born on September 19, 1940, in Moscow into the family of a dynastic priest.

After five failed attempts to enroll in Moscow's State College of Circus and Variety Arts, Amarantov was successful on his sixth application, supported by well-known clown-mime Leonid Yengibarov, who was a member of the selection committee.

== Career ==
In 1962 Boris graduated from state college with the performance Ke-la-la (backing track Chella llà), which was staged by Sergei Kashtelyan. Amarantov performed Ke-la-la on the variety show Little Blue Light and starred in the film Fair Wind, 'Blue Bird'!.

In the same year he was awarded at the VIII World Festival of Youth and Students in Helsinki, Finland making an impression with his act Save the World (Nuclear Worker Failed), which warned of the threat of an escalating Cold War. The spot was based on the combination and contrast of two different songs: Top, Тop, Stomping the Вaby by Tamara Miansarova and a composition called I Want You to Be My Baby, performed by American singer Lillian Briggs.

Soon Amarantov created his own theater of pantomime. Amarantov, Grigory Chukhray and Mark Donskoy staged the performance Miracles in His Bag which proved to be a success. As a result of intrigue from senior officials of the Russian Soviet Federative Socialist Republic (RSFSR) Ministry of Culture, the theatre was closed several times. While the theatre was re-established, Amarantov himself lost his engagement and he started working as a night watchman. In July 1975, he wrote a letter to the Supreme Soviet Presidium with a statement renouncing his Soviet citizenship and requesting the right to exit from the USSR to the West, this request was refused.

In August 1977, he emigrated from the USSR and arrived to the United States in November. Contrary to his hopes, Amarantov's aspirations for an acting career in the USA did not materialize. He moved to France, where he attended the school of mime Marcel Marceau.

== Death ==
After returning to the USSR at the beginning of perestroika, he died under mysterious circumstances on March 3, 1987. The circumstances of Amarantov's death remain unknown as official medical examination was kept hidden from the public either by his relatives or doctors. Speculations about his death arose such as suspected assassination for disrespecting high-ranking Soviet officers, death by disease contracted while travelling the US or Europe, or suicide from the stress and pressure he endured from his family. The official cause of death has not been revealed to this day. He was buried at the Vostryakovskoye Cemetery in its 129th section.

== Filmography ==
- Evening in Moscow (short, 1962) as juggler
- On Tomorrow's Street (1965) as mim Boris Amarantov
- Fair Wind, "Blue Bird"! (1967) as Lorimur
- Love for Three Oranges (TV, 1970) as Tartaglio
- The Big Attraction (1974) as mim
