= The Last Meeting =

1967 film

- Directed by: Antonio Eceiza
- Written by: Antonio Eceiza; Elías Querejeta
- Produced by: Elías Querejeta
- Starring: Antonio Gades
- Cinematography: Luis Cuadrado
- Edited by: Pablo González del Amo
- Release date: 8 May 1967
- Running time: 80 minutes
- Country: Spain
- Language: Spanish

The Last Meeting (Spanish: Último encuentro) is a 1967 Spanish drama film directed by Antonio Eceiza. It was entered into the 1967 Cannes Film Festival.

== Cast ==
- Antonio Gades - Antonio Esteve
- Daniel Martín (actor) - Juan
- Calderas - tango singer
- Francisco Carames
- Pepe de la Peña - dancer
- Perico el del Lunar - guitarist
- Emilio de Diego - guitarist
- Enrique Esteve - dancer
- Cristina Hoyos - dancer (as Cristina)
- José Luna 'El Tauro' - dancer
- Juan Maya - guitarist
- José Meneses - martinete singer
- Daniel Moya - guitarist
- Félix Ordóñez - dancer
