= Radmila Karaklajić =

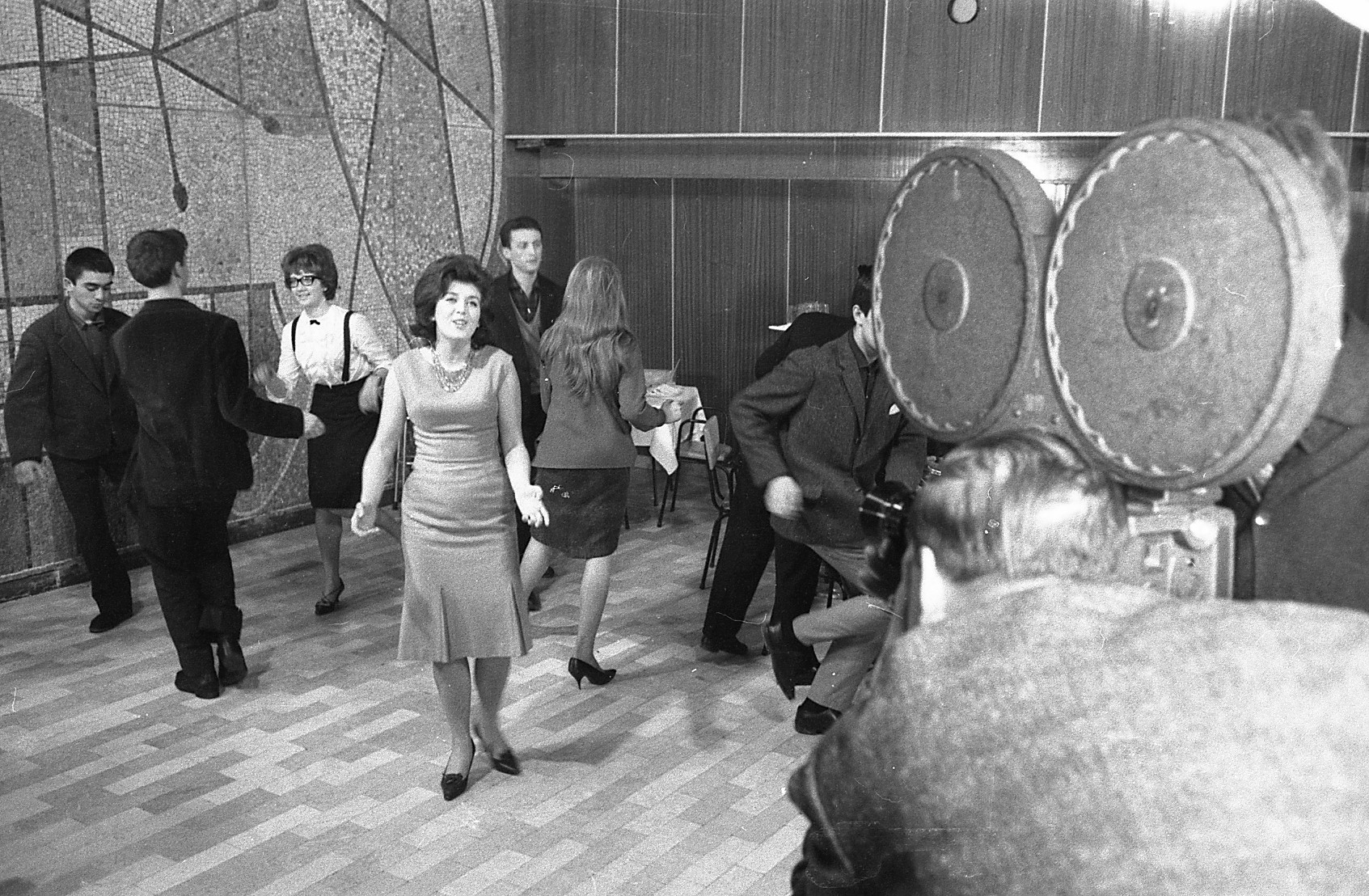
- Karaklajić in 1963

Background information
- Born: 8 October 1939 (age 86); Belgrade, Kingdom of Yugoslavia
- Genres: Pop
- Occupations: Singer, Actress
- Years active: 1960–present

Radmila Karaklajić (Serbian: Радмила Караклајић; 8 October 1939) is a Serbian singer and actress. Karaklajić is most famous for her 1964 release Anđelina zumba zumba (cover of Louis Prima's "Angelina / Zooma Zooma"), which gained her notoriety in the Soviet Union and Yugoslavia. Her career spans over six decades.

She studied at the faculty of Western European languages at the University of Belgrade.

== Discography ==
=== EP ===
- Anđelina, zumba, zumba / Poziv na tvist / Selena tvist / Kroz planine na put (1964)
- Crne oči / Kolja / Smeši se mesec / Ja ću te pričekati (1964)
- Nada / Ja nisam više dete / Mi u kampu / Ti, ljubavi, ti (1964)
- Niko mi ne može suditi / Ti si baš taj / To naše mesto / U naše vreme (1966)
- Pata pata (1968)

=== Albums ===
- Radmila Karaklajić (1978)
- Ciganske pesme (1981)
- Радмила Караклаич (1983)

=== Singles ===
- Ljubavi / Taka taka (1973)
