= Jean-Marie Catonné =

French writer

Jean-Marie Catonné (born November 26, 1941, in Paris) is a French writer. He is the author of many books, among them La Tête étoilée (1996), Portraits volés (2001), Villa Les Mésanges bleues (2002), Double Je (2007) and several biographies, including one of the French-Lithuanian writer Romain Gary.
