= Soleil Ô =

1970 French-Mauritanian film by Med Hondo

- Film poster
- Directed by: Med Hondo
- Written by: Med Hondo
- Starring: Robert Liensol; Théo Légitimus
- Cinematography: François Catonné; Jean-Claude Rahaga
- Edited by: Michèle Masnier; Clément Menuet
- Music by: George Anderson
- Production companies: Grey Films; Shango Films
- Distributed by: USA: New Yorker Films
- Release dates: May 1970 (Cannes); 4 January 1973 (France)
- Running time: 98 minutes
- Countries: Mauritania; France
- Languages: French; Hassaniya Arabic
- Budget: $30,000

Soleil Ô ([sɔ.lɛj o]; "Oh, Sun") is a 1970 French-Mauritanian drama film written and directed by Med Hondo.

The title refers to a West Indian song that tells of the pain of the black people from Dahomey (now Benin) who were taken to the Caribbean as slaves. While relatively obscure, it was featured in the Sight and Sound top 250 films of all time in 2022.

== Premise ==
A black immigrant makes his way to Paris in search of his Gaul ancestors. The immigrants desperately seek work and a place to live, but find themselves face to face with indifference, rejection, and humiliation, before heeding the final call for uprising.

== Cast ==
- Robert Liensol as Visitor
- Théo Légitimus as Afro Girl
- Gabriel Glissand
- Bernard Fresson as Friend
- Yane Barry as White Girl
- Greg Germain
- Armand Meffre
- Med Hondo as the narrator

== Reception ==
The film played during the International Critics' Week at the 1970 Cannes Film Festival, where it received critical acclaim. It received a Golden Leopard award at the 1970 Locarno International Film Festival.

In his Family Guide to Movies on Video, Henry Herx wrote that the film's "use of ironic humor and lively music keeps the plight of the black emigrant worker from becoming totally depressing."

In The New Yorker, Richard Brody wrote: "Making friends among France's white population, [the main character] finds their empathy condescending and oblivious, and his sense of isolation and persecution raises his identity crisis to a frenzied pitch. Hondo offers a stylistic collage to reflect the protagonist’s extremes of experience, from docudrama and musical numbers to slapstick absurdity, from dream sequences and bourgeois melodrama to political analyses."

In the 2022 Sight and Sound critic's poll, this film was tied for 243rd place alongside films such as Annie Hall, Earth, Mouchette, and A Clockwork Orange. It has a 4.0/5 rating on the user review site Letterboxd and was added to the Criterion Collection.

== Restoration ==
In 2017, Soleil Ô was restored by Cineteca di Bologna. The funding for the restoration came from the George Lucas Family Foundation and the World Cinema Project, as part of the latter's restoration initiative called the African Film Heritage Project.

== See also ==
- List of Mauritanian films
