= Med Hondo =

Mauritanian actor (1935–2019)

- Born: Mohamed Abid; 4 May 1935; Atar, Mauritania
- Died: 2 March 2019 (aged 83); Paris, France
- Occupations: Actor; producer; screenwriter; film director
- Years active: 1967–2013
- Notable work: Soleil O (1970); West Indies (1979)

Med Hondo (born Mohamed Abid; 4 May 1935 – 2 March 2019) was a Mauritanian-French actor. Considered a founding father of African cinema, he is known for his controversial films dealing with issues such as race relations and colonization. His critically acclaimed 1970 directorial début feature, Soleil O, received the Golden Leopard award at the 1970 Locarno International Film Festival and was chosen in 2019 by the African Film Heritage Project for restoration. His 1979 film West Indies was the first African film musical and, at $1.3 million, the most expensive production in African film history.

In his later years, Hondo became known for dubbing Hollywood hits that included Shrek, The Lion King, The Nutty Professor, and Se7en.

== Biography ==
Hondo was born in 1935 in Atar. His mother was Mauritanian and his father Senegalese. In 1954, Hondo went to Rabat, Morocco, to train to become a chef at the International Hotel School there. He emigrated to France in 1959 and found work first in Marseille and then in Paris, variously as a cook, farm labourer, waiter, dockworker and delivery man. He found that he and other African immigrants were unable to gain work in their chosen professions, and in the menial jobs they could find, they were paid less than the French. The difficulty of making a living during this time, as well as the racism he experienced, eventually provided inspiration for Hondo's films, including Soleil O (1970) and Les Bicots-nègres, vos voisins (1974).

He began to take classes in acting and directing, and studied under French actress Françoise Rosay, acting in classic plays by Shakespeare, Molière and Racine. Hondo was unable to fully express himself with French repertoire theatre, and in 1966 formed his own theatre company with Guadeloupean actor Robert Liensol. Named Shango (from Shango, the Yoruba god of thunder), and later Griot-Shango, the company produced plays relating the experiences of Black people, including works by René Depestre and Aimé Césaire.

In the late 1960s, Hondo started taking small acting roles in television and films. As he learned the craft of film making by careful observation of the work of others, he began to get work behind the camera. He began work on his first film, Soleil O, in 1965. Made on a $30,000 budget, it was financed by Hondo's work dubbing American films into French. Soleil O played during International Critics' Week at the 1970 Cannes Film Festival, where it received critical acclaim. Soleil O received a Golden Leopard award at the 1970 Locarno International Film Festival. In 1981, Hondo was a member of the jury at the 12th Moscow International Film Festival.

Hondo also worked frequently as a voice actor. He worked on the dubbing of many English-language films into French, voicing characters played on screen by Sidney Poitier, Morgan Freeman, Ben Kingsley and Danny Glover (on the rare occasions when Glover was not dubbed by Richard Darbois). Hondo dubbed several of Eddie Murphy's films, including The Nutty Professor (1996) and the part of Donkey in 2001's Shrek and its sequels.

Med Hondo explained on his website that he met with Danny Glover in 1991 and presented his then-current project to him: a biopic of Haitian revolutionary Toussaint Louverture. According to Hondo, an enthusiastic Glover voiced his interest in the lead role, and in taking part in the production side of the film, but then cut all communication with Hondo and co-writer Claude Veillot. Hondo claimed that Glover's own Louverture biopic project, financially backed by Hugo Chavez, was inspired by his original screenplay, and addressed an open letter to Glover in which he denied assertions from Glover's "Louverture Films" company that the script was a commission paid by Glover to Hondo. Hondo also mentioned his meeting with Glover in an English-language interview on French international news channel France 24.

Hondo died in Paris on 2 March 2019, aged 83.

== Filmography ==
=== Director ===
- 1967: Soleil O
- 1974: Les Bicots-nègres, vos voisins (Arabs and Niggers, Your Neighbours)
- 1975: Sahel la faim pourquoi
- 1977: Nous aurons toute la mort pour dormir
- 1979: West Indies
- 1986: Sarraounia
- 1994: Lumière noire (Black Light)
- 1998: Watani, un monde sans mal
- 2004: Fatima, l'Algérienne de Dakar

=== Actor ===
- 1964: Les verts pâturages (TV Movie)
- 1965: Belphégor (TV Mini-Series) as Gaillac
- 1965: Seule à Paris (TV Series)
- 1965: Bob Morane (TV Series) as Notomi, le guide indien
- 1966: Retour à Bacoli (TV Movie) as Un tirailleur
- 1967: Un homme de trop as Florent
- 1968: Tante Zita as James
- 1969: A Walk with Love and Death as Entertainer
- 1974: Aux frontières du possible (TV Series) as Le docteur Sosian Cisse
- 1975: Jo Gaillard (TV Series) as Carlos
- 1977: The Ambassadors as Med
- 1978: Safrana ou le droit à la parole as Récitant / Narrator (voice)
- 1989–1991: Commissaire Moulin (TV Series) as Max
- 1990: 1871 as Karl Marx
- 1997: La divine poursuite as the pilot
- 2000: Antilles sur Seine as Horace
- 2002–2004: Funky Cops (TV Series) as Ace (French version, voice)
- 2006: Incontrôlable as Rex (voice)
- 2006: Asterix and the Vikings as pirate lookout (voice)

=== Dubbing ===
- 1982: Gandhi as Ben Kingsley's Mohandas Karamchand Gandhi
- 1984: Beverly Hills Cop as Eddie Murphy's Axel Foley
- 1984: Best Defense as Eddie Murphy's Lieutenant T.M. Landry
- 1994: The Lion King as Rafiki
- 1995: Se7en as Morgan Freeman's Detective Lt. William Somerset
- 1996: The Nutty Professor as Eddie Murphy's Sherman Klump
- 2001: Samurai Jack as Aku
- 2001: Shrek as Eddie Murphy's Donkey
- 2003: Xiaolin Showdown as Dojo
- 2004: Shrek 2 as Donkey
- 2007: Shrek the Third as Donkey
- 2010: Shrek Forever After as Donkey
