= Yūrei-zu =

Genre of Japanese art

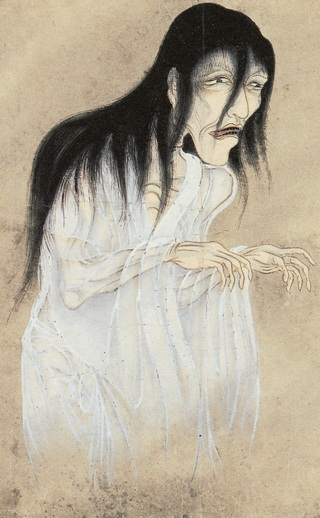
Yūrei by Sawaki Sūshi (1737)

Yūrei-zu (幽霊図) are a genre of Japanese art consisting of painted or woodblock print images of ghosts, demons and other supernatural beings. They are considered to be a subgenre of fūzokuga, "pictures of manners and customs". These types of art works reached the peak of their popularity in Japan in the mid- to late 19th century.

== Yūrei ==
Literally translatable as 'faint (幽, yū) spirit (霊, rei)', yūrei is just one of several Japanese words used to refer to spirit beings. Other terms include: obake (お化け), yōkai (妖怪), bōrei (亡霊), and shiryō (死霊). There is a long tradition of belief in the supernatural in Japan stemming from a variety of influences. Imported sources include Buddhism, Taoism and Chinese folklore. The most notable influence, however, is Shintō, a native Japanese animistic religion which presupposes that our physical world is inhabited by eight million omnipresent spirits.

Japanese ghosts are essentially spirits "on leave" from hell in order to complete an outstanding mission. The souls (霊魂, reikon) of those who die violently, do not receive proper funerary rites, or die while consumed by a desire for vengeance, do not pass peacefully to join the spirits of their ancestors in the afterlife. Instead, their reikon souls are transformed into ayurei souls, which can travel back to the physical world. According to Buddhist belief, the journey from the world of the living (この世, konoyo) to that of the dead (あの世, anoyo) takes 49 days, and it is in this limbo-like phase that they can attend to unresolved issues. There is a close relationship between the degree of an individual's suffering in life and the severity of their actions in the afterlife. While their intentions are not always evil, the results of their actions are almost always damaging for the humans involved. Belief held that a ghost could only receive release through the prayers of a living individual that his/her soul be allowed to pass into the underworld.

== Historical background ==
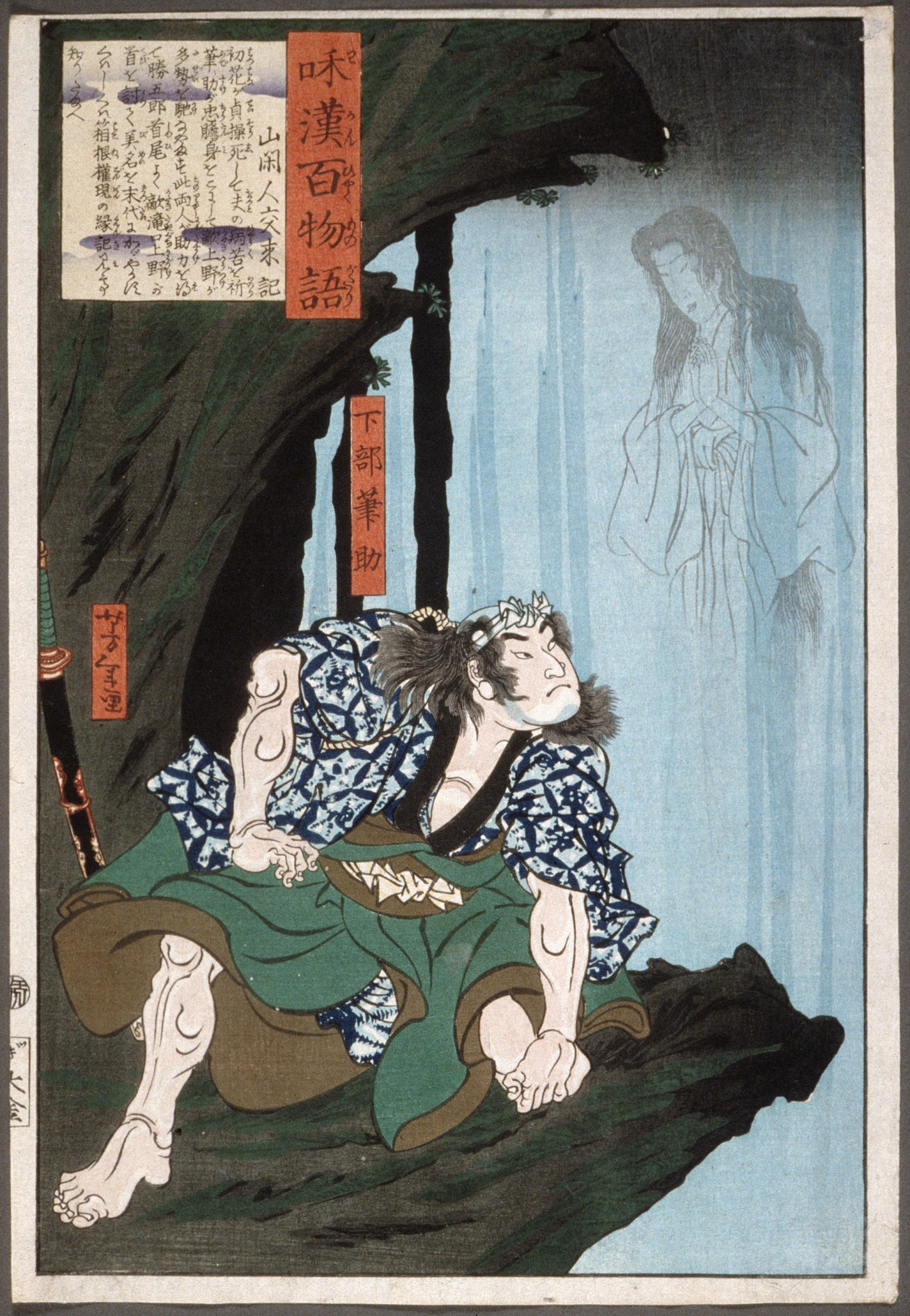
Shimobe Fudesuke and the Ghost of the Woman in the Waterfall by Tsukioka Yoshitoshi (c. 1865)

Images of supernatural beings, as well as gory and grotesque scenes exist on Japanese painted scrolls going back to the medieval period. This tradition continued through the centuries, providing a foundation for yūrei-zu, as well as for violent chimidoro-e (血みどろ絵, "bloody pictures") and muzan-e (無残絵, "cruel pictures"), which were to become popular in Edo Japan. Although there are prior examples, yūrei-zu reached the pinnacle of their popularity in the mid- through late 19th century, along with ghost themed kabuki plays and ghost tales (怪談, kaidan). Scholars link the "persistent popularity" of the occult to the "unsettled social conditions" prevailing during the late Edo, which included the oppressive Tokugawa regime, the beginnings of westernization, and a number of natural disasters.

== Yūrei-zu and theatre ==
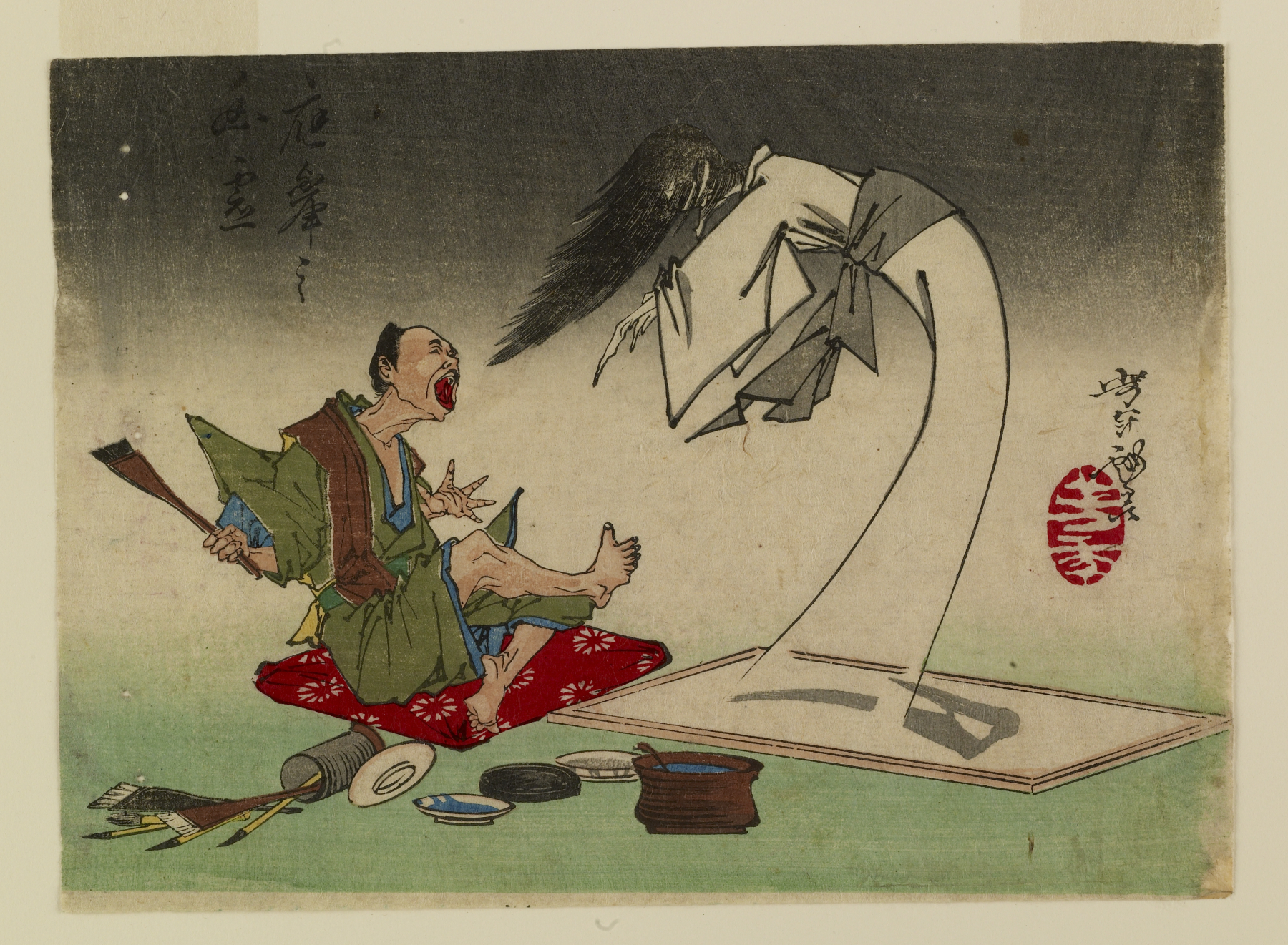
Yoshitoshi ryakuga by Tsukioka Yoshitoshi (1882)

Japan has long had a vibrant folkloric tradition of ghost stories, and in the early eighteenth century these began to be dramatized for the nō stage and bunraku puppet theatre. As kabuki began to flourish throughout the later 1700s, so too did the number of dramas based on ghost stories, particularly those involving vengeful female ghosts returning to punish their wrong-doers. Kabuki, like ukiyo-e, was a populist art form, which aimed to satisfy the dramatic tastes of a "proletarian clientele": the rising working and middle classes in Edo (present-day Tokyo). Kabuki and ukiyo-e shared a close kinship, as woodblock artists attempted to tap into "the public's ever-increasing appetite for tales of the bizarre and thrilling", and share the kabuki audience demographic. As Sarah Fensom notes, "that prints of the macabre, the supernatural and the grotesque were so frequently designed and distributed is for the most part a greater reflection of 19th century Japanese tastes than of the agenda of the artists." Artists produced images of ghosts as well as of actors in ghost roles, effecting a conflation of three prevailing trends in ukiyo-e of the period: depictions of the female form (bijin-ga), depictions of supernatural or macabre themes, and depictions of celebrated actors (kabuki-e or shibai-e).

== Censorship ==
In an attempt to return Japan to its feudal, agrarian roots, the Tokugawa regime in 1842 instituted the Tenpō Reforms (天保の改革, Tenpō no kaikaku), a collection of laws governing many aspects of everyday life. In addition to the economy, the military, agriculture and religion, the Reforms reached into the world of art. The intent of the Reforms was essentially to valorize frugality and loyalty, thus ostentatious or morally dubious images such as depictions of geisha, oiran courtesans and kabuki actors were banned. According to an 1842 decree aimed at print publishers: "To make woodblock prints of Kabuki actors, courtesans and geisha is detrimental to public morals. Henceforth the publication of new works [of this kind] as well as the sale of previously procured stocks is strictly forbidden. In future you are to select designs that are based on loyalty and filial piety and which serve to educate women and children, and you must insure that they are not luxurious."

Given this climate of censorship, some artists used the yūrei-zu genre "to symbolically and humorously disguise … criticism of the social and political maladies of the day by having fantastic creatures appear as substitutes for real people, especially the ruling elite." Such critiques led the government to subsequently ban both yūrei-zu and ghost plays. The Tempō Reforms were ultimately unsuccessful, and the strict regulation of art works was no longer enforced after 1845, once the shogunal advisor who had initiated the Reforms left the government. As long as the rules remained nominally in effect, some artists invoked clever word- and picture-play to circumvent censorship.

== Yūrei-zu physical characteristics ==
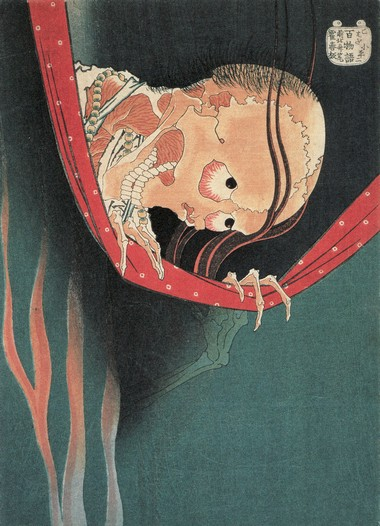
Kohada Koheiji by Hokusai (1831–1832)

The ghosts featured in Edo period ukiyo-e come in various forms. They can appear as animal creatures both real and imagined, such as foxes, cats, dragons and demons. They can also be the discontent spirits of male warriors. Most of the ghosts featured, however, tend to be female, "specifically", as Donald Richie notes, "dissatisfied females".

The subjects in yūrei-zu typically correspond to a very specific set of physical characteristics:

- long, straight black hair, which is often unkempt
- white or pale-coloured kimono akin to the plain white katabira (帷子) or kyōkatabira (経帷子) funerary kimono
- long, flowing sleeves
- some are depicted with a triangular forehead cloth also associated with Japanese funerary tradition
- a thin, fragile frame
- outstretched arms, sometimes waving or beckoning
- hands hanging limply from the wrists
- no body below the waist
- often accompanied by hitodama (人魂), green, blue or purple floating flames
- transparent or semi-transparent

By nature, they:

- are nocturnal
- avoid running water
- appear in true ghostly guise when reflected in a mirror or water surface

== Notable Edo examples ==
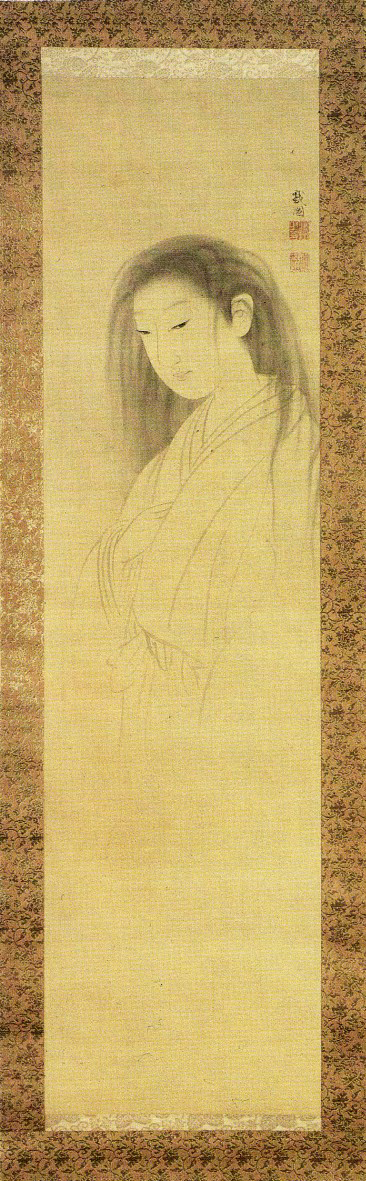
Ghost of Oyuki by Maruyama Ōkyo (1750–1780)

=== The Ghost of Oyuki ===
The earliest yūrei-zu is considered to be by Maruyama Ōkyo (円山 応挙), founder of the Maruyama school and one of the most significant artists of the 18th century. The Ghost of Oyuki (お雪の幻, Oyuki no maboroshi) is a silk scroll painting dating to the second half of the 18th century In Maruyama's naturalistic style, it depicts a faintly coloured female ghost whose body tapers into transparency. It has been described as an "image of haunting beauty". According to a scroll box inscription by a one-time owner, the subject of the painting is Maruyama's lover, a geisha who died young. Her ghost is said to have visited the artist in a dream and inspired him to paint her portrait.

=== Other Edo artists ===
All of the pre-eminent ukiyo-e artists of the later Edo period produced yūrei-zu, including Kunisada, Hokusai and Utagawa Kuniyoshi, who "designed the largest number of prints portraying ghosts as well as other strange, unusual and fantastic creatures."

Another major producer of yūrei-zu was Tsukioka Yoshitoshi who reputedly had personal encounters with ghosts in 1865 and 1880. In 1865 he produced the series One Hundred Ghost Stories of China and Japan (Wakan hyaku monogatari), his first series to feature ghosts. The original series, which was based on a popular game of the period involving ghost stories, included one hundred images; however, only twenty-six were published. His final print series, New Forms of 36 Ghosts (Shinkei sanjūrokuten), was "so freakishly popular", according to Sarah Fensom, "that the blocks from which it was printed wore out."

== Contemporary examples ==
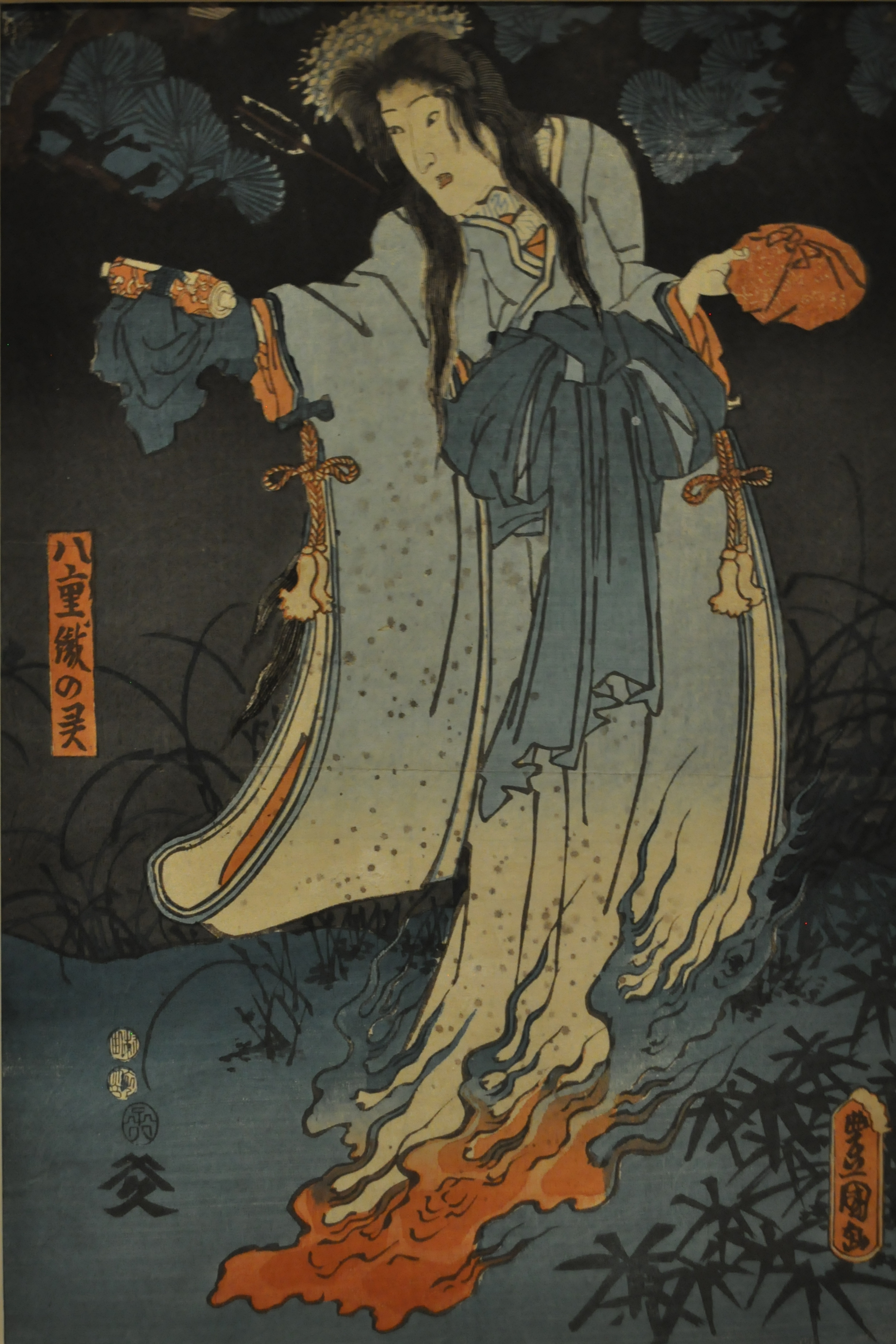
Female Ghost by Kunisada (1852)

Although patently no longer as pervasive as during the late Edo period, yūrei-zu and contemporary variations continue to be produced by Japanese artists in various media. One prominent example is the nihonga painter Fuyuko Matsui (b. 1974), whose ghostly images are described as "beautiful and eerie", "dark [and] Gothic", and "disturbing and mesmerizing". Matsui has identified a goal of her works as imparting "a condition that maintains sanity while being close to madness". Matsui's colour on silk hanging scroll "Nyctalopia" (2005) is particularly reminiscent of classic yūrei-zu such as Maruyama's The Ghost of Oyuki.

Another artist whose works echo yūrei-zu is Hisashi Tenmyouya (b. 1966). Between 2004 and 2005, Tenmyouya completed a series of acrylic on wood paintings entitled New Version of Six Ghost Stories (新形六怪撰). The six images are reworkings of famous Japanese ghost stories, such as Tokaido Yotsuya Ghost Story and Kohata Koheiji Ghost Story, which were rendered in woodblocks by Edo artists.

Also creating contemporary yūrei-zu in a traditional style is American-born, Japanese-resident artist Matthew Meyer. His Japanese Yōkai series is collected in his illustrated book The Night Parade of One Hundred Demons. According to Meyer, the intention of his paintings is "to recreate the feeling of old Japanese woodblock prints while adding a contemporary illustrative touch."

The influence of yūrei-zu is also evident in the manga of Shigeru Mizuki (b. 1922) and Hiroshi Shiibashi (b. 1980), both of whom are renowned for their works dealing with traditional Japanese aspects of the supernatural.

== See also ==
- Edo period in popular culture
- Satori (folklore)
- List of legendary creatures from Japan
