= Botan Dōrō =

Japanese ghost story

The character of Otsuyu and the titular peony lantern

Botan Dōrō (牡丹燈籠, The Peony Lantern) is a Japanese ghost story (kaidan) and one of the most famous kaidan in Japan. The plot involves sex with the dead and the consequences of loving a ghost.

It is sometimes known as Kaidan Botan Dōrō (怪談牡丹灯籠, Tales of the Peony Lantern), based on the kabuki version of the story; this title is commonly used in translation, and refers to a Stone Lantern.

== History ==
Botan Dōrō entered Japanese literary culture in the 17th century, through a translation of a book of Chinese ghost stories called Jiandeng Xinhua (New Tales Under the Lamplight) by Qu You. The collection was didactic in nature, containing Buddhist moral lessons on karma.

In 1666, author Asai Ryoi responded to the Edo period craze for kaidan, spawned largely by the popular game Hyakumonogatari Kaidankai, by adapting the more spectacular tales from Jiandeng Xinhua into his own book Otogi Boko (Hand Puppets). At the time, Japan's borders were entirely closed, with very little of the outside world known by its people; as such, China was viewed as a mysterious and exotic nation. Asai removed the Buddhist moral lessons and gave the stories a Japanese setting, placing Botan Dōrō in the Nezu district of Tokyo.

Otogi Boko was immensely popular, spawning multiple imitative works such as Zoku Otogi Boko (Hand Puppets Continued) and Shin Otogi Boko (New Hand Puppets), and is considered the forerunner of the literary kaidan movement that resulted in the classic Ugetsu Monogatari.

In 1884, Botan Dōrō was adapted by famous storyteller San'yūtei Enchō into a rakugo, which increased the popularity of the tale. In order to achieve a greater length, the story was fleshed out considerably, adding background information on several characters as well as additional subplots. It was then adapted to the kabuki stage in July 1892, and staged at the Kabukiza under the title Kaidan Botan Dōrō.

In 1899, Lafcadio Hearn, with the help of a friend, translated Botan Dōrō into English for his book In Ghostly Japan. He titled his adaptation A Passional Karma, and based it on the kabuki version of the story.

A more modern version of the play was written in 1974 by the playwright Onishi Nobuyuki for the Bungakuza troupe, starring Sugimura Haruko, Kitamura Kazuo and Ninomiya Sayoko. It was so successful that it was staged again a few years later in April 1976 at the Shimbashi Embujo. A new adaptation by Kawatake Shinshichi III was staged for the first time with a full kabuki casting in June 1989, again at the Shimbashi Embujo. The Kawatake version is still occasionally revived but is less popular than the Onishi one.

Much like Yotsuya Kaidan, there remains a superstition that actors who play the ghost roles in Kaidan Botan Doro will come to harm. This comes from a 1919 performance at the Imperial Theater, when the two actresses playing Otsuyu (お露) and her maid became sick and died within a week of each other.

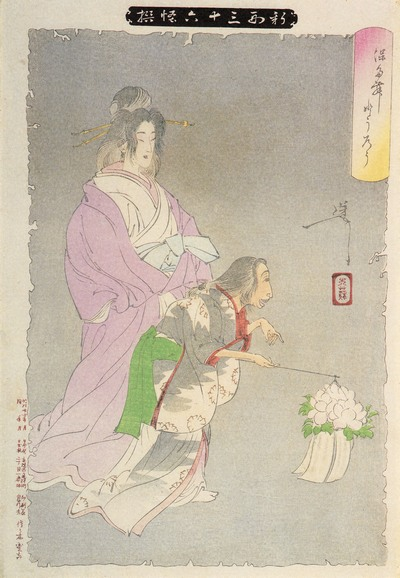

== Story ==
=== Otogi Boko version ===
On the first night of Obon, a beautiful woman and a young girl holding a peony lantern stroll by the house of the widowed samurai Ogiwara Shinnojo. Ogiwara is instantly smitten with the woman, named Otsuyu, and vows an eternal relationship. From that night onward, Otsuyu and the girl visit at dusk, always leaving before dawn. An elderly neighbor, suspicious of Otsuyu, peeks into his home and finds Ogiwara in bed with Otsuyu, but to the neighbour she does not appear as a beautiful woman, but rather a woman in the form of a skeleton. Consulting a Buddhist priest, Ogiwara finds that he is in danger unless he can resist Otsuyu, and he places a protection charm on his house. Otsuyu is then unable to enter his house, but calls him from outside. Finally, unable to resist, Ogiwara goes out to greet her, and is led back to her house, a grave in a temple. In the morning, Ogiwara's dead body is found entwined with Otsuyu's skeleton.

=== Kabuki version ===
A young student named Saburo falls in love with a beautiful woman named Otsuyu, the daughter of his father's best friend. They meet secretly, and promise to be married. However, Saburo falls ill, and is unable to see Otsuyu for a long time.

Later, when Saburo recovers and goes to see his love, he is told that Otsuyu has died. He prays for her spirit during the Obon festival, and is surprised to hear the approaching footsteps of two women. When he sees them, they look remarkably like Otsuyu and her maid. It is revealed that her aunt, who opposed the marriage, spread the rumor that Otsuyu had died and told Otsuyu in turn that Saburo had died.

The two lovers, reunited, begin their relationship again in secret. Each night Otsuyu, accompanied by her maid who carries a peony lantern, spends the night with Saburo.

This continues blissfully until one night a servant peeks through a hole in the wall in Saburo's bedroom, and sees him having sex with a decaying skeleton, while another skeleton sits in the doorway holding a peony lantern. He reports this to the local Buddhist priest, who locates the graves of Otsuyu and her maid. Taking Saburo there, he convinces him of the truth, and agrees to help Saburo guard his house against the spirits. The priest places ofuda around the house, and prays the nenbutsu every night.

The plan works, and Otsuyu and her maid are unable to enter, although they come every night and call out their love to Saburo. Pining for his sweetheart, Saburo's health begins to deteriorate. Saburo's servants, afraid that he will die from heartbreak and leave them without work, remove the ofuda from the house. Otsuyu enters, and again has sex with Saburo.

In the morning, the servants find Saburo dead, his body entwined with Otsuyu's skeleton, with a blissful expression on his face.

=== Differences ===
The main differences between the two versions are the changing of the human lover from Ogiwara Shinnojo, an elderly widower, to Saburo, a young student, and the establishment of a pre-existing lover's relationship between Otsuyu and Saburo.

Where the Otogi Boko version was written during the isolated Edo period, the rakugo and kabuki version were written after the Meiji restoration, and was influenced by the flood of Western literature and theater that accompanied the modernization of Japan.

One of these influences was adding a romantic element to the story, something that was played down in older kaidan. The Otogi Boko version makes no mention of Otsuyu's death; both the rakugo and kabuki versions create the idea of Otsuyu and Saburo's love being stronger than death, and emphasize Saburo's peaceful expression when his body is found entwined with the skeleton.

== Influences and references ==
Botan Dōrō establishes the theme of a sexual encounter with the ghost of a woman as a central aspect of the story, a theme which would later go on to influence a number of later kaidan. This theme follows the standard pattern of a Noh theater katsuramono play, where the female ghost hides her spectral nature until the final reveal at the end of the story.

The nature of the ghost's return to Earth is either a lingering love, or a general loneliness. The Otogi Boko version of Botan Dōrō has no prior relationship, and Otsuyu merely wishes for a companion in the afterlife. The rakugo and kabuki versions, however, have Otsuyu returning for a former lover.

The sexual ghost can be found in Kyōka Izumi's story Maya Kakushi no Rei (A Quiet Obsession) which features a sensual encounter with a female ghost in an onsen.

Botan Dōrō is famous for the onomatopoeia 'karan koron', which is the sound of Otsuyu's wooden clogs announcing her appearance on stage.

== Film ==
Box cover for Nikkatsu's Hellish Love

Botan Dōrō is one of the first Japanese ghost stories to be put to film, with a silent version in 1910. Six further adaptations were made between 1911 and 1937, although all of these have been lost to time and only the titles are still known. It is second only to Yotsuya Kaidan in film adaptations, with a new version released every decade as either cinematic releases, direct-to-video releases, or television versions.

Notable is Satsuo Yamamoto's 1968 version, filmed for Daiei Studios. It is variously known as Bride from Hell, Haunted Lantern, Ghost Beauty, My Bride is a Ghost, Bride from Hades, or Peony Lanterns. Yamamoto's film roughly follows the Otogi Boko version of the story, establishing protagonist Hagiwara Shinzaburo as a teacher who flees an unwanted marriage with his brother's widow and lives quietly some distance from his family. The usual encounter with Otsuyu follows, although the inevitable consequence is treated as a happy ending, or, at worst, bittersweet, since they are united beyond the grave, if not in life.

In 1972, director Chūsei Sone made a pink film version for Nikkatsu's Roman Porno series, entitled Hellish Love (性談牡丹燈籠, Seidan botan doro). Following the rakugo and kabuki versions, Hellish Love places emphasis on the sexual nature of the relationship between the protagonist and Otsuyu. Otsuyu is killed by her father, who disapproves of the match with such a lowly samurai, but she promises to return on Obon to be reunited with her lover.

A massive change in the story is made in Masaru Tsushima's 1996 Otsuyu: Kaidan botan dōrō (Haunted Lantern). This version has Shinzaburo dreaming of a past life, where he promised a double suicide with Otsuyu, but fails to kill himself after she dies. In his present life, he meets a girl named Tsuya who is the reincarnation of his past beloved, but Shinzaburo's father arranges a marriage for him with Tsuya's sister, Suzu. Shinzaburo's friend attempts to rape Tsuya, so that she would stop being a nuisance jealous of her younger sister. Devastated, the two sisters commit suicide together. The usual consequences follow, but the film ends with Shinzaburo and Otsuyu further reincarnated together, living happily in a future life.

== See also ==
- Bancho Sarayashiki
- Japanese horror
- Japanese mythology
- Obake
- Onryō
