= 怪談 =

Chinese name
- Traditional Chinese: 怪談
- Simplified Chinese: 怪谈
- Literal meaning: strange talk
Transcriptions
Standard Mandarin
- Bopomofo: ㄨㄞˋ ㄊㄢˊ
- Wade–Giles: kuai t'an
Yue: Cantonese
- Jyutping: gwaai3 taam4

Japanese name
- Kanji: 怪談
- Hiragana: かいだん (Modern) くゎいだん (Historical)
Transcriptions
- Romanization: kaidan (Modern) kwaidan (Historical)

怪談 (meaning ghost story) may refer to:

- The Unbelievable (1996 TV series) Hong Kong TV show about the paranormal and supernatural in East Asia
- Kaidan (kwaidan) generally ghost story or horror story; restrictedly, traditional Japanese ghost stories and supernatural tales
- Kwaidan (film), 1964 Japanese anthology horror film
- Kaidan (2007 film), 2007 Japanese horror film
- Kwaidan: Stories and Studies of Strange Things (1904 book) Japanese ghost story collection

== See also ==
- The dictionary definition of 怪 at Wiktionary
- The dictionary definition of 談 at Wiktionary
