= The Bride From Hades =

1968 Japanese horror film

- Film poster

Japanese name
- Kanji: 牡丹燈籠
Transcriptions
- Revised Hepburn: Botan-dôrô
- Directed by: Satsuo Yamamoto
- Written by: Yoshikata Yoda
- Based on: Botan Dōrō
- Produced by: Masaichi Nagata
- Starring: Kōjirō Hongō; Miyoko Akaza; Kô Nishimura
- Cinematography: Chikashi Makiura
- Edited by: Kanji Suganuma
- Music by: Sei Ikeno
- Production company: Daiei Film
- Distributed by: Daiei
- Release date: 1968
- Running time: 89 minutes
- Country: Japan
- Language: Japanese

The Bride From Hades (Japanese: 牡丹燈籠, Hepburn: Botan-dôrô), also known as Peony Lantern, is a 1968 Japanese horror film directed by Satsuo Yamamoto. It is based on the Japanese ghost story Botan Dōrō or Peony Lantern, in which a man falls in love with the ghost of a deceased woman.

== Plot ==
The film opens in feudal Japan on the first day of Obon. Shinzaburo, despite being from a well off samurai family, teaches poor children who live in the village row houses. Shinzaburo's father wants him to marry his brother's wife after he died in an accident shortly after their wedding, but Shinzaburo is hesitant.

Later, Shinzaburo leads the village kids as they participate in a lantern float at a nearby river. Shinzaburo helps a free two lanterns that get stuck by a branch, and two women thank him for helping them.

The women from the river come to Shinzaburo's home to thank him. They say they are "women of the Yoshiwara" who were given permission to leave during Obon. The younger woman, Otsuyu, is set to marry an elderly man. Her mistress, Oyone, asks Shinzaburo to marry Otsuyu before Obon is over and they have to return. Shinza's neighbor, Banzo, sees the women leaving Shinza's house, recognizing Otsuyu.

Banzo tells a friend about seeing the women. His friend says he can't have seen them as both women are dead. He says that they must be ghosts who were able to appear as it is their first Obon.

Oyone asks Shinza to take Otsuyu as his wife for the remainder of Obon. Oyone officiates a wedding for them in Shinza's home, and the two sleep together.

Banzo sees the two of them having sex through their window, but sees Otsuyu as a ghoul instead of the women that Shinza sees. Banzo is chased off by Oyone's ghost, and he flees to his friend Haksudo and tells him what happened. The men approach Shinza the next day and say that he has to end the marriage or he will die.

Shinza locks his doors to keep the ghosts out, but they get in anyway. Shinza tries to strike them with his katana but they fight back. Banzo sees Shinza swinging at nothing and tries to snap him out of his trance, but Shinza scares him off. Oyone asks Shinza to stay with Otsuyu for the three remaining days of Obon, and he agrees.

The villagers see the high priest for help. He says to lock Shinza up for the rest of Obon to keep him from the ghosts, and to put prayer scrolls over the doors to keep them out. Shinza agrees to being locked up.

At night the ghosts come but are scared away by the prayer scrolls. They try to get Shinza to let them in but he refuses, saying he has to live for the sake of the children.

Banzo's wife returns home, oblivious to what's going on. She falls asleep and Oyone enters his home and asks him to tear the scrolls off Shinza's home before the next night. When the ghosts return he asks for 100 ryo. Oyone tells them to find money in a grave north of theirs, and to tear the scrolls off after she has it.

At the temple graveyard, Banzo digs up the grave and finds 100 ryo. Otsuyu and Oyone physically pull Banzo and his wife to Shinza's house to tear the scrolls. Banzo rips a scroll and opens the door. Otsuyu enters, telling Shinza they're taking him to the other world and they embrace.

The next day, the villagers find Shinza dead next to the skeletons of Otsuyu and Oyone.

Banzo and his wife leave town but stop at the graveyard to look for more money. A group of men approach and accuse them of stealing the money they had buried them, and they kill the couple in revenge.

In the village, a funeral procession takes place for Shinza.

== Cast ==
- Kôjirô Hongô as Hagiwara Shinzaburô
- Miyoko Akaza as Otsuyu
- Mayumi Ogawa as Omine
- Kô Nishimura as Banzô
- Takashi Shimura as Hakuôdô
- Michiko Ôtsuka as Oyone

== Production ==
This is the 14th filmed version of the story to be produced. It was filmed at Daiei-Kyoto Studios in Fujicolor and DaieiScope.

== Release ==
The film released in Japan on June 15th, 1968 as a double-feature with the horror movie The Ghostly Trap.

The film received a US release with English subtitles and was given the international title of A Tale of Peonies and Lanterns. It also is known by Ghost Story: Peony Lantern, Bride From Hell, Ghost Beauty, and My Bride is a Ghost.

In October 2024, the film was released as part of a Blu-Ray set titled Daiei Gothic - Japanese Ghost Stories, alongside The Snow Woman and The Ghost of Yotsuya.
