= The Ghost of Yotsuya (Daiei film) =

- Film poster
- Directed by: Kenji Misumi
- Written by: Fuji Yahiro
- Based on: Yotsuya Kaidan by Nanboku Tsuruya
- Produced by: Nobuo Miura
- Starring: Kazuo Hasegawa; Yasuko Nakada; Yōko Uraji
- Cinematography: Yukimasa Makita
- Edited by: Kanji Suganuma
- Music by: Seiichi Suzuki
- Production company: Daiei Film
- Release date: 1 July 1959 (Japan)
- Running time: 84 minutes
- Country: Japan
- Language: Japanese

The Ghost of Yotsuya (Japanese: 四谷怪談, Hepburn: Yotsuya kaidan) is a 1959 Japanese horror film directed by Kenji Misumi. It is one of the many pieces of Japanese media that adapts the kabuki play Yotsuya Kaidan, including a twin release with a Shintoho film of the same name released in 1959.

The film follows the plot of the original play, but shifts the characters to make a more unique retelling of the story.

== Plot ==
Set in Edo during the period of feudal Japan, the film follows Iemon, a samurai looking for work. Iemon's wife Oiwa is recovering from a miscarriage and is feeling pressured to provide an heir.

Iemon fights off three men who are chasing women in an inn. Iemon's good deeds cause Oume of the Ito clan to fall in love with him.

Oume and her family scheme to poison Iemon's wife so he will marry Oume instead. Telling her that it is instead a cure, Oiwa takes the poison which causes her face to become disfigured. Oiwa dies and returns as a onryō, intent on taking her revenge.

== Cast ==
- Kazuo Hasegawa as Iemon Tamiya
- Yasuko Nakada as Oiwa
- Yōko Uraji as Oume
- Mieko Kondō as Osode
- Jōji Tsurumi as Kohel
- Naritoshi Hayashi as Yomoshichi
- Hideo Takamatsu as Naosuke Gombei
- Chieko Murata as Omaki

== Production ==
The film is one of the first color films produced in Japan. It was filmed with Fujicolor and DaieiScope at Daiei-Kyoto Studios in Kyoto, Japan.

Kazuo Hasegawa was seen as an odd casting choice for the role of Iemon, who the original play depicts as villainous. Misumi's adaptation, however, sees Iemon as a sort of tragic hero, justifying the casting.

== Release ==
The film released on July 1, 1959 by Daiei Film. Shintoho's adaptation of the same story released 10 days later, in direct competition Daiei.

The film received a US release with English subtitles and was given the international title of Thou Shalt Not Be Jealous.

In October 2024, the film was released as part of a Blu-Ray set titled Daiei Gothic - Japanese Ghost Stories, alongside The Snow Woman and The Bride From Hades.

== Reception ==
Kiyoshi Kurosawa has stated that this film is his favourite adaptation of the Yotsuya Kaidan story.
