= The Snow Woman =

- Theatrical release poster

Japanese name
- Kanji: 怪談雪女郎
Transcriptions
- Revised Hepburn: Kaidan Yukijorō
- Directed by: Tokuzō Tanaka
- Screenplay by: Fuji Yahiro
- Based on: Kwaidan: Stories and Studies of Strange Things by Lafcadio Hearn
- Produced by: Ikuo Kubodera
- Starring: Shiho Fujimura; Akira Ishihama; Machiko Hasegawa
- Cinematography: Chikashi Makiura
- Edited by: Hiroshi Yamada
- Music by: Akira Ifukube
- Production company: Daiei Film
- Distributed by: Daiei
- Release date: April 20, 1968 (Japan)
- Running time: 80 minutes
- Country: Japan
- Language: Japanese

The Snow Woman (Japanese: 怪談雪女郎, Hepburn: Kaidan Yukijorō; lit. 'Ghost Story of the Snow Woman') is a 1968 Japanese fantasy horror film directed by Tokuzō Tanaka and produced by Daiei Film. The film is an expanded adaptation of the Yuki-onna short story as it appeared in the 1904 collection Kwaidan: Stories and Studies of Strange Things by Lafcadio Hearn.

== Plot ==
The film opens on two sculptors walking through a snow-covered forest during the Edo period. The men find a large tree that the elder master wants to cut down and carve into a statue of the Buddhist goddess Kannon. A blizzard begins, and the men shelter in an abandoned cottage. While sleeping, a woman enters the cottage and freezes the master to death. She spares the younger apprentice (Yosaku), making him promise to not tell anyone what he saw or she will kill him.

Later, Yosaku is living with the old master's widow. The large tree is cut down and brought to the village. Yosaku is instructed to carve the statue that the old master would have wanted, which is to be placed in the temple.

A young woman (Yuki) traveling through town stays the night at Yosaku's home during heavy rain. The master's widow gets ill overnight, and Yuki says that her parents were doctors so she goes to look for herbs to cure the widow.

While passing through the village, feudal Lord Jito is accosted by children, and beats the widow in response, blaming her for the children's misbehavior. On her deathbed, the widow asks Yuki to marry Yosaku.

Yuki and Yosaku attend a Buddhist service. The shamaness or medium running the service is suspicious of Yuki, and flings boiling water at her, burning her skin.

Five years pass, Yuki and Yosaku are married and have a son (Taro). Lord Jito proposes to the high priest that Yosaku and Gyokei, an expert sculptor, both sculpt a Kannon statue and that the priest decides on the best statue.

Jito's men accuse Yosaku of stealing the large tree, despite Jito having previously given permission to take it. The men say that if he does not pay a fee within five days, Yosaku will be arrested.

Yuki tries to appeal to the governor but he is away. She instead meets with his wife, who is caring for her ill son. Yuki promises to cure the son. She transforms into the Snow Woman and creates snow to quell the boy's fever. By the time the governor returns, the boy is cured and he pays Yuki for her work. Yuki uses the money to pay Jito's fee.

Yosaku has nearly finished the statue, but is struggling to finish its face. He gets inspired by Yuki, and she becomes his muse for the statue's face.

Gyokei presents his golden statue to the high priest, but he is not impressed. He says the face on the goddess lacks a compassionate soul.

Later, Yuki and Yosaku attend a festival to pray for inspiration for the statue's eyes. The shamaness again tries to burn Yuki, but she flees. She's attacked by Jito's men and he attempts to rape her. Turning into the Snow Woman, Yuki freezes Jito to death.

The shamaness accuses Yuki of killing Jito and says that she is a demon. Yosaku realizes that Yuki is the Snow Woman who killed his master, and confronts her about their first encounter. As this breaks his promise to never speak of the incident, Yuki says she must kill him, but is interrupted by their son, Taro crying in the other room. Yuki lets Yosaku live and disappears into a blizzard, telling Yosaku to care for their son and finish his statue. In the final scene, Yuki looks back regretfully at the family she is deserting, and Yosaku sees in her face the compassionate expression that he needs to finish his statue while Taro futilely calls out to her, begging not to leave them.

== Cast ==
- Shiho Fujimura as Yuki
- Machiko Hasegawa as Wife
- Akira Ishihama as Yosaku
- Taketoshi Naitō as Mino Gonmori
- Yoshiro Kitahara as Jōjin
- Sachiko Murase as Soyo
- Suga Fujio as Soju
- Mizuho Suzuki as Gyokei
- Masao Shimizu as Jiun
- Shinya Saitō as Taro
- Jutaro Hojo as Matsukawa
- Tatsuo Hananuno as Shigeruasa
- Hara Izumi as Miko
- Tokio Oki as Doctor A
- Jun Fujikawa as Doctor B
- Yukio Horikita as Guard
- Ichi Koshikawa as Man of the Agency

== Production ==
The snowy exterior scenes were all shot on a studio sound stage at Daiei-Tokyo Studios as opposed to on location. This was done to provide an eery, unnatural feel.

== Release ==
The Snow Woman was released in Japan on April 20, 1968. It was released in the United States as Snow Ghost by Daiei International Films with English subtitles in 1969. The film was released on VHS by Daiei Home Video on July 8, 1994 and on DVD on July 25, 2014, by Kadokawa Shoten.

In October 2024, the film was released as part of a Blu-Ray set titled Daiei Gothic - Japanese Ghost Stories, alongside The Ghost of Yotsuya and The Bride From Hades.
