= The Ghost of Yotsuya =

The Ghost of Yotsuya may refer to:

- The Ghost of Yotsuya (1959 Shintoho film)
- The Ghost of Yotsuya (1959 Daiei film)
