= Zenshō-an =

Temple in Tokyo, Japan

Coordinates: 35.7242°N 139.7668°E

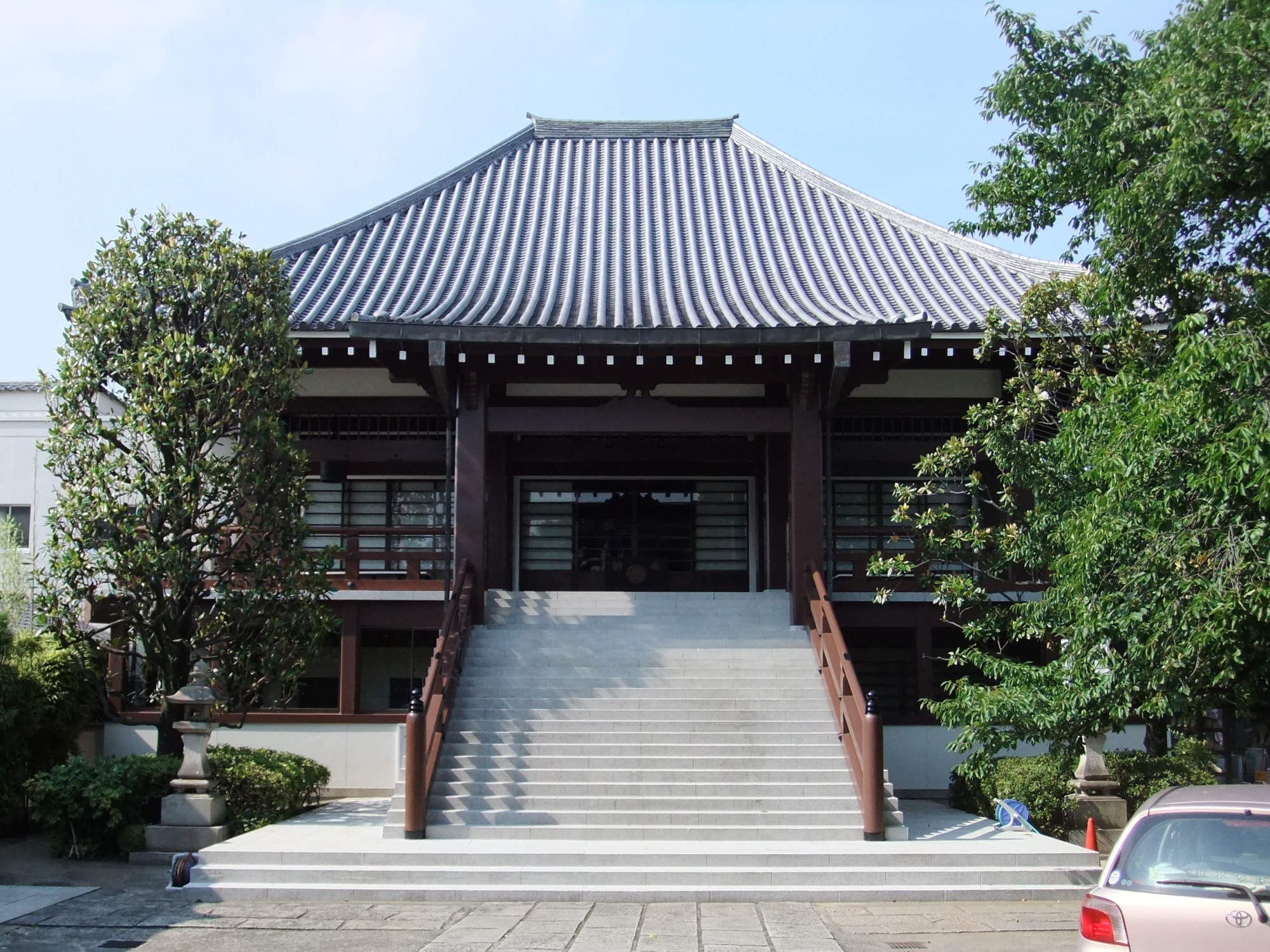
Zenshō-an in Tokyo

Zenshō-an (全生庵) is a Buddhist Rinzai Zen temple, located in Taitō, Tokyo, Japan.

It has a large collection of Japanese yūrei paintings, which are normally exhibited in August, the traditional month of spirits and ghosts. These paintings were most probably kept by families during the Edo period also to ward off evil. The temple has long been popular with influential Japanese figures, including Prime Ministers Shinzo Abe and Nakasone Yasuhiro.

A large exhibition was shown the summer of 2015 in cooperation with the Tokyo University of the Arts.

== History ==
The temple was founded in 1883 by Yamaoka Tesshū. The temple retained significant influence with Japanese political leadership throughout the twentieth century.
