= Kido Okamoto =

Japanese author (1872–1939)

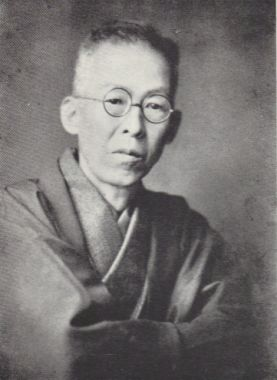
Picture of Kido Okamoto

Kido Okamoto (岡本 綺堂, Okamoto Kidō; October 15, 1872 – March 1, 1939) was a Japanese author and playwright. His real name was Keiji Okamoto (岡本 敬二, Okamoto Keiji). His best known work is the Shin Kabuki play Bancho Sarayashiki.

Kido was born in the district of Shiba Takanawa, a neighbourhood in Minato Ward, Tokyo.

== Family ==
Kido's father, Okamoto Keinosuke (岡本佳之助), later Kiyoshi (清), was a samurai who, after the Meiji Restoration, left the service of the Tokugawa Shōgunate and went to work for the British Legation as an interpreter. He was good friends with Ichikawa Danjūrō IX (九代目市川團十), Konakamura Kiyonori (ja:小中村清矩), Kawanobe Mitate (川辺御楯) and Kurokawa Mayori (黒川真頼), who together formed the Antiquarian Society (求古会, Kyūko Kai) to promote the modernisation of Kabuki based on the doctrine of the Theatre Reform Movement (演劇改良運動, Engeki Kairyō Undō). He was also friends with Morita Kan'ya XII (十二代目守田勘弥)), the owner-manager of the Shintomiza Theatre, and an employee of the British Legation; avid Kabuki fan Thomas Russell Hillier McClatchie; and Austro-Hungarian diplomat Heinrich von Siebold.

== Life ==
With the relocation of the British Legation to Kōjimachi District in 1873, Kido's father moved there with his wife and daughter. Kido was born at Nigō Hanzaka (二合半坂), Iitachō (飯田町), Kōjimachi. Later they moved Motozono-chō (元園町), also in Kōjimachi. Kido learnt tokiwazu (常磐津) from the daughter of a local hairdresser and nagauta (長唄) by listening to his older sister's lessons. Early on, when he was too young to go the Kabuki, he was left at home in the care of two maids and would listen to the gossip of his mother and older sister about the performances when they returned home. As he got older, he went to the Kabuki with his family when the family would socialise at the Kikuoka (菊岡) tea house in the Shintomiza Theatre's enclosure. During his early attendances at the Kabuki, he took a dislike to Danjūrō IX after witnessing what he described as childish behaviour during an incident backstage. Later, however, Kido became an ardent fan.

He would listen to foreign ghost stories told to him by his uncle who brought them back from his overseas travels. He was especially enamoured by Windsor Castle by William Harrison Ainsworth, which he mistook for Hamlet. At the age of 16 he knew William George Aston, the Secretary of the British Legation, whose children he babysat and from whom he was taught about Shakespeare, a process which Kido said taught him some of the techniques of playwriting. Much to Kido's delight Aston later helped him find the scripts for Kawatake Mokuami's plays Nakamitsu, Shisenryō Koban Umenoha, and Kagatobi, which had been published by the Ginza-based Kabuki Shinpō (Kabuki News) Company. He learnt Chinese poetry from his father, and English from his uncle and students at the British Legation. He attended and graduated from Tokyo First Junior High School afterwards attempting to become a playwright but when that failed from 1890 he wrote stage reviews for the newspaper Tōkyō Nichi Nichi Shimbun (東京日日新聞; lit. 'Tokyo Daily News'), now the Mainichi Shimbun, when he used the pseudonym Kyokido, which he later changed to Kido. He went to work for Chūō Shimbun, spending 24 years as a newspaper reporter, including a period in Manchuria. He bought the contract of and married a Yoshiwara Geisha from the Uwajima feudal domain called Kojima Sakae (小島栄).

Success eluded him until in 1911, his popular play The Mask maker's Story (修善寺物語, Shuzenji Monogatari) premiered at the Meijiza. In 1916 his Shin (new) Kabuki play Story of a Broken Dish at Bancho (番町皿屋敷, Bancho Sarayashiki) was staged at the Hongōza Theatre (本郷座). Between 1917 and 1937 The Curious Casebook of Inspector Hanshichi (半七捕物帳, Hanshichi Torimonocho) was serialised. His series on the theatre of the Meiji period, a valuable resource, the first half of which was serialised in the Monthly Kabuki Review Magazine in the late 1920s, early 1930s as Stories of the Past (過ぎにし物語, Sugi ni shi Monogatari), then again as a series in 1935 and finally in full as On the Theatre of the Meiji Period – Under the Lamp (明治劇談ランプの下にて, Meiji Gekidan Ranpu no Moto ni te) by Iwanami Shoten in 1993.

In 1918 he visited the US and Europe. His home and library in Kōjimachi were destroyed in the Great Earthquake of 1923. He was taken in by his disciple Nukata Roppuku (額田六福), from where he moved to Azabu, Minato. The following year he moved to Hyakuni chō (百人町), a street in north Shinjuku. From 1935 his articles were occasionally published in Sande Mainichi|ja (ja:サンデー毎日; lit. 'Every Sunday'). His last novel was the controversial Tiger (虎, tora), published in 1937, about two brothers running a freak show which is in trouble who hit the jackpot when they get a Tiger cub. He continued to publish plays in the magazine "Stage" (舞台, Butai) from 1930 until 1938. In 1939 he died of pneumonia and is buried with his wife in Aoyama cemetery in Minami-Aoyama, Tokyo.

After his death one of his students and adoptive heir, his son Okamoto Kyōichi (岡本経一; 1909-2010), founded the Okamoto Kido Journal which printed much of Kido's work. Kido's grandson Okamoto Shuichi (岡本修一) is the current president. The Okamoto Kido Literary Prize, The Okamoto Kido Award (岡本綺堂授与, Okamoto Kido Juyo) was established but was only awarded twice between 1943 and 1944 during the period leading up to the end of the Second World War.
