= Banchō Sarayashiki =

Tragic Japanese ghost story

Folk tale
- Name: Banchō Sarayashiki
- Country: Japan

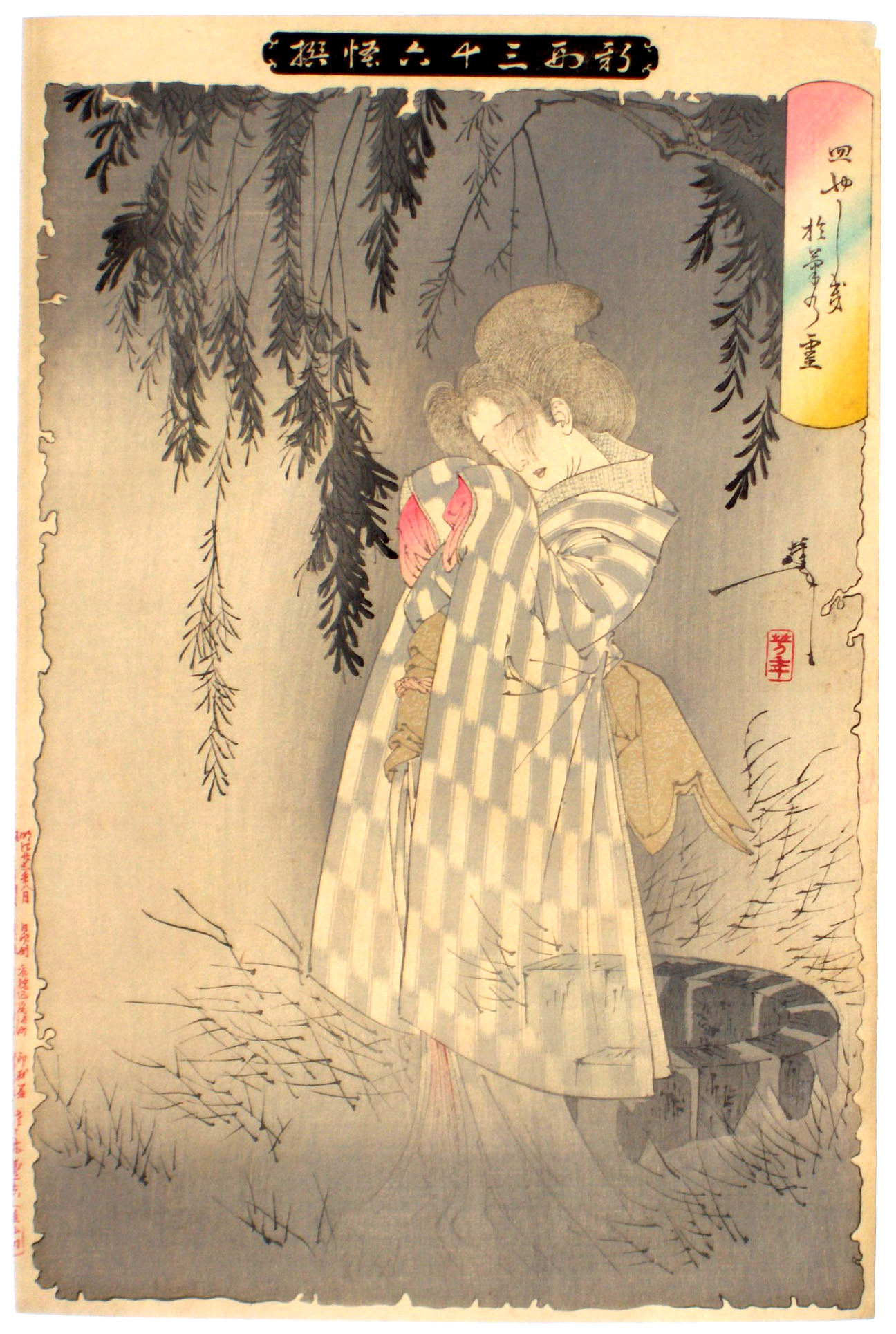
Tsukioka Yoshitoshi's portrait of Okiku.

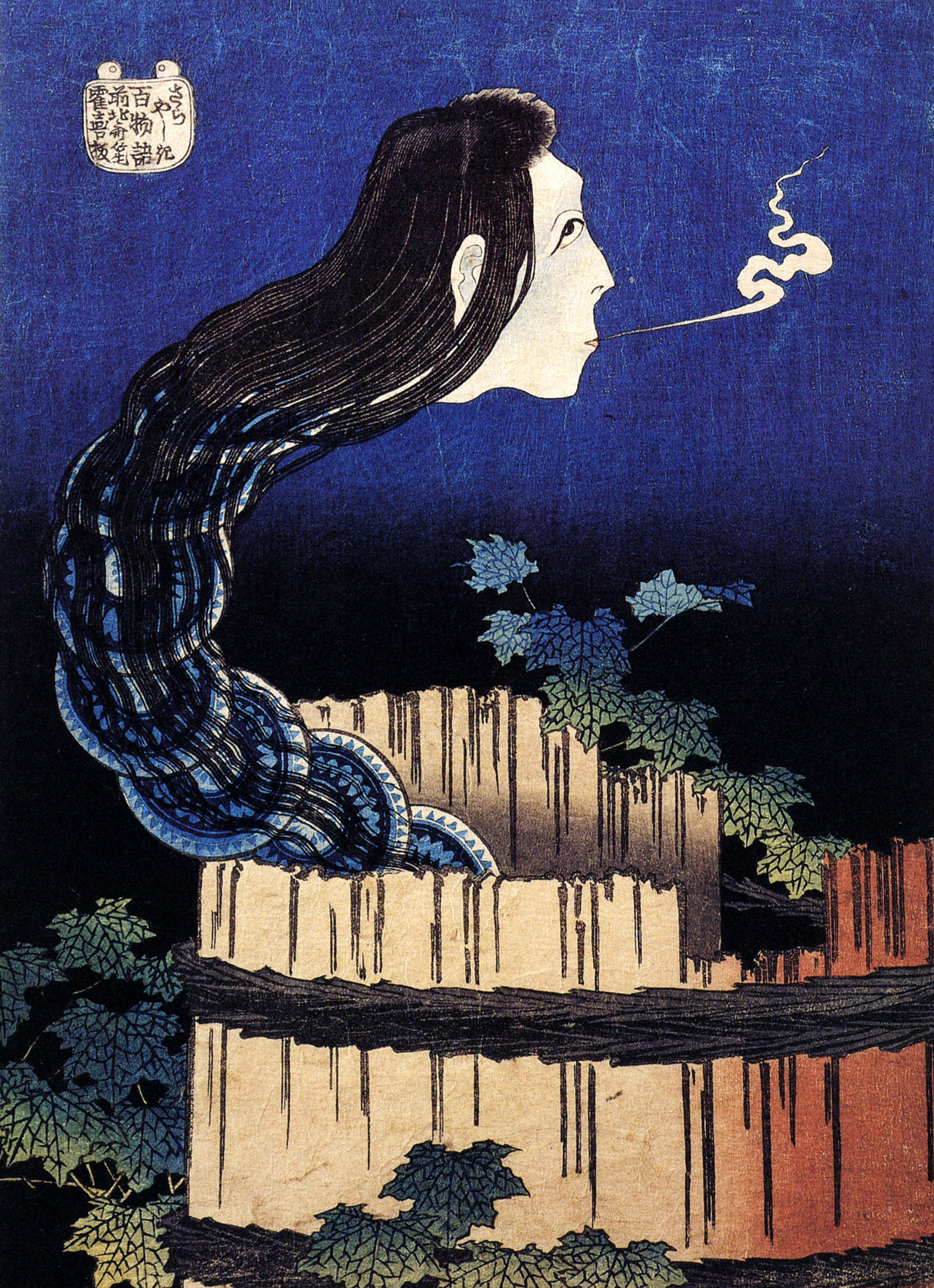
An ukiyo-e print by Hokusai depicting Okiku, from his series One Hundred Ghost Stories

Banchō Sarayashiki (番町皿屋敷, The Dish Mansion at Banchō) is a Japanese ghost story (kaidan) of broken trust and broken promises, leading to a dismal fate. Alternatively referred to as the sarayashiki (皿屋敷, Manor of the Dishes) tradition, all versions of the tale revolve around a servant, who dies unjustly and returns to haunt the living. Some versions take place in Harima Province (播磨国, Harima no kuni) or Banshū (播州), others in the Banchō (番町) area in Edo.

== History ==
The story of the death of Okiku (お菊) first appeared as a bunraku play called Banchō Sarayashiki in July 1741 at the Toyotakeza theater. The familiar ghost legend had been adapted into a ningyō jōruri production by Asada Iccho and Tamenaga Tarobei I. Like many successful bunraku shows, a kabuki version followed and in September 1824, Banchō Sarayashiki was staged at the Naka no Shibai theater starring Otani Tomoemon II and Arashi Koroku IV in the roles of Aoyama Daihachi and Okiku.

A one-act kabuki version was created in 1850 by Segawa Joko III, under the title Minoriyoshi Kogane no Kikuzuki, which debuted at the Nakamura-za theater and starred Ichikawa Danjūrō VIII and Ichikawa Kodanji IV in the roles of Tetsuzan and Okiku. This one-act adaptation was not popular, and quickly folded, until it was revived in June 1971 at the Shinbashi Enbujō theater, starring the popular combination of Kataoka Takao and Bando Tamasaburō V in the roles of Tetsuzan and Okiku.

The most familiar and popular adaptation of Banchō Sarayashiki, written by Okamoto Kido, debuted in February 1916 at the Hongō-za theater, starring Ichikawa Sadanji II and Ichikawa Shōchō II in the roles of Lord Harima and Okiku. It was a modern version of the classic ghost story in which the horror tale was replaced by a psychological study of the two characters' motivations.

== Plot summary ==
=== Folk version ===
There was a beautiful dishwashing servant named Okiku who worked at Himeji Castle. Her master attempted to make her his lover but she rejected him each time. He grew impatient and wanted to trick her into becoming his, so he hid one of ten precious dishes that she was responsible for. When he called for her, he told her one of the plates was missing. In a frenzy, she counted and recounted the nine plates many times. The samurai offers to overlook the matter if she finally becomes his lover, but she rejects him again. Enraged, Aoyama has his servants beat her, tie her up and suspend her above a well. He tortures Okiku before again demanding that she marry him. Aoyama then slashes her with his sword and drops her body into the well.

Okiku becomes a vengeful spirit (onryō) who torments her murderer by counting to nine and then making a terrible shriek to represent the missing tenth plate – or perhaps she had tormented herself and was still trying to find the tenth plate but cried out in agony when she never could. In some versions of the story, this torment continued until an exorcist or neighbor shouted "ten" in a loud voice at the end of her count. Her ghost, finally relieved that someone had found the plate for her, haunted the samurai no more.

=== Ningyō Jōruri version ===
Hosokawa Katsumoto, the lord of Himeji Castle, has fallen seriously ill. Katsumoto's heir, Tomonosuke, plans to give a set of 10 precious plates to the shōgun to ensure his succession. However, chief retainer Asayama Tetsuzan plots to take over. Tomonosuke's retainer, Funase Sampei Taketsune is engaged to marry a lady in waiting, Okiku. Tetsuzan plans to force Okiku to help him murder Tomonosuke.

Tetsuzan, through the help of a spy, steals one of the 10 plates and summons Okiku to bring the box containing the plates to his chamber. There, he attempts to seduce Okiku. She refuses due to her love for Taketsune. Rejected, Tetsuzan then has Okiku count the plates to find only nine. He blames her for the theft and offers to lie for her if she will be his mistress. Okiku again refuses and Tetsuzan has her beaten with a wooden sword.

Tetsuzan then has her suspended over a well and, erotically enjoying her torture, has her lowered into the well several times, beating her himself when she is raised. He demands that she become his lover and assist in the murder of Tomonosuke. She refuses again, whereupon Tetsuzan strikes her with his sword, sending her body into the well.

While wiping clean his sword, the sound of a voice counting plates comes from the well. Tetsuzan realizes that it is the ghost of Okiku but is entirely unmoved. The play ends with the ghost of Okiku rising from the well, Tetsuzan staring at her contemptuously.

=== Okamoto Kido version ===
Set in Edo in 1655, a vassal of the shogun, Harima Aoyama, has fallen in love with a young servant girl, Okiku. They have promised to marry, but Aoyama receives a marriage proposal through an aunt. In order to test Aoyama's intentions, Okiku breaks one of ten heirloom plates that passed through generations of his household. The traditional punishment for breaking such an heirloom was beheading. When Aoyama hears of the incident and is told that Okiku broke it by accident, he pardons her, and reaffirms his love for her. However, when she later confesses, Aoyama is enraged and breaks the remaining plates, kills her, and throws her down a well.

From then after, Okiku's yūrei (ghost) is seen to enter the house and count the plates, one through nine. Encountering her in the garden, Aoyama sees that her ghostly face is not one of vengeance, but beauty and calm. Taking strength from this, he commits seppuku and joins her in death.

Okamoto's version premiered in February 1916 at the Hongōza in Bunkyō, Tokyo, starring Sadanji Ichikawa II and Shōchō Ichikawa II. It is notable for being a much more romantic adaptation of the story, similar to the kabuki version of Botan Dōrō. This was an influence of the Meiji Restoration, which brought Western plays to Japan for the first time. Western plays were much more noticeable for romantic elements, and this was adapted into a style of theater known as Shin Kabuki, or New Kabuki. Shin Kabuki was ultimately an unsuccessful merger of East and West, although Okamoto's Banchō Sarayashiki remains as one of the few classics.

=== Variations ===
In some versions of the tale, Okiku is a maid who incurs her mistress' jealousy. Her mistress breaks one of the dishes that Okiku is responsible for and Okiku commits suicide. Similar to the other versions, her ghost is heard counting the plates, but her mistress goes insane and dies.

== Okiku and ukiyo-e ==
Like many kabuki plays, Okiku was a popular subject matter for ukiyo-e artists. In 1830, Katsushika Hokusai included her as one of the kaidan in his One Hundred Ghost Stories (Hyaku monogatari) series. Ekin, a somewhat notorious artist who had troubles with the law, painted a byōbu-e (Note: Paintings on byōbu, Japanese folding screens) of Okiku being accused by Tetsuzan Aoyama and his brother Chuta.

Most notably, she appeared as one of the New Forms of Thirty-Six Ghosts by Tsukioka Yoshitoshi. His portrayal of Okiku is unusually sympathetic, particularly as ghosts were viewed as fearsome apparitions by nineteenth-century Japanese, reflecting a general trend in his later work.

== Influences on Japanese culture ==
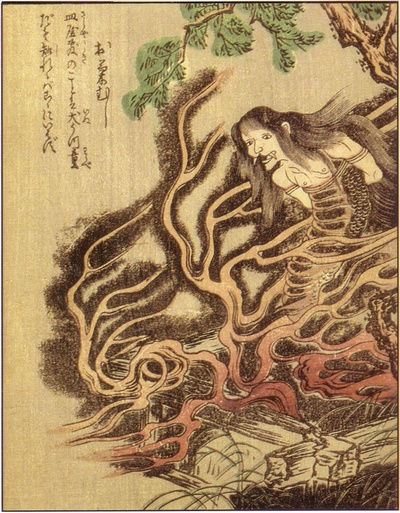
Illustration of the "Okiku insect" from Ehon Hyaku Monogatari.

In 1795, old wells in Japan suffered from an infestation of byasa larvae that became known as the "Okiku insect" (お菊虫, okiku mushi). This larva, covered with thin threads making it look as though it had been bound, was widely believed to be a reincarnation of Okiku. The Ningyo Joruri version is set in Himeji Castle, a popular tourist attraction at the castle is Okiku-Ido, or Okiku's Well. Traditionally, this is where the hapless maid's body was thrown after being killed by Tetsuzan. Although the castle is closed at night, it is said that her ghost still rises nightly from the well, and counts to nine before shrieking and returning.

== Adaptations ==
Manga artist Rumiko Takahashi included a parody of the legend of Okiku in her romantic comedy Maison Ikkoku. As part of an Obon event, the residents of Ikkoku-kan take part in a summer festival; Kyoko dresses up as Okiku and is supposed to hide in a shallow well.

The manga Akane-banashi depicts a rakugo performance of the legend of Okiku. Notably, this rendition is a comedic adaptation of the story; when three men go to see the well Okiku's ghost rises out of, one of them realizes what a beautiful woman she is, causing her popularity to suddenly increase. As the story progresses, Okiku ends up behaving like a performer rather than a vengeful ghost; at its climax, rather than counting nine plates, she counts eighteen. When asked why, she delivers the story's punchline: she doubled up on the number of plates she counted so she can take the next day off.

The noted fiction writer Yūko Tsushima refers to the legend in her novel The Chrysanthemum Beetle (菊虫, Kikumushi), in which the main character, engaged in a romantic relationship coloured by jealousy, helps her friend clean insects from her flat. Her friend's daughter takes one to show to her father, but the insect disappears and her father tells her that it was probably a Chrysanthemum beetle that turned into a white butterfly. He then tells her of Okiku, a maid who put a needle on her master's (her lover) plate and was murdered as punishment, and whose vengeance lives on in the form of the beetle.

Another adaptation was made in 2002, in Story 4 of the Japanese television drama Kaidan Hyaku Shosetsu.

Okiku and her legend also appear in Rin Chupeco's 2014 horror novel The Girl from the Well and its sequel, The Suffering. In this adaptation, Okiku is a vengeful spirit who punishes child murderers.

The Ring is a horror media franchise featuring Sadako (or Samara). Sadako is a girl who died in a well and seeks revenge by making a haunted videotape and killing whoever views it. Her appearance and traits are based on the Okiku legend. Sadako is depicted as meeting Okiku in the manga series Sadako at the End of the World.

== See also ==
- Japanese horror
- Japanese mythology
- Obake
- Yotsuya Kaidan
