= Kaidan =

Japanese word for "ghost story"

Kaidan (怪談; sometimes transliterated kwaidan) is a Japanese word consisting of two kanji: 怪 (kai) meaning 'strange, mysterious, rare, or bewitching apparition' and 談 (dan) meaning 'talk' or 'recited narrative'.

In its broadest sense, kaidan refers to any ghost story or horror story, but it has an old-fashioned ring to it that carries the connotation of Edo period Japanese folktales. The roots of Edo period kaidan stories originate from the Jiandeng Xinhua(剪燈新話), a book of stories from the Ming Dynasty in China. The term kaidan is no longer as widely used in Japanese as it once was: Japanese horror books and films would more likely be labeled by the katakana horā (ホラー; 'horror'). Kaidan is used to give an old-fashioned air to the story.

== Examples ==
- Banchō Sarayashiki (The Story of Okiku) by Okamoto Kido
- Yotsuya Kaidan (Ghost Story of Tōkaidō Yotsuya) by Tsuruya Nanboku IV (1755–1829)
- Botan Dōrō (The Peony Lantern) by Asai Ryoi
- Mimi-nashi Hōichi (Hōichi the Earless)

== Hyakumonogatari Kaidankai and kaidanshu ==
Kaidan entered the vernacular during the Edo period, when a parlour game called Hyakumonogatari Kaidankai became popular. This game led to a demand for ghost stories and folktales to be gathered from all parts of Japan and China.The popularity of the game, as well as the acquisition of a printing press, led to the creation of a literary genre called kaidanshu. Kaidanshu were originally based on older Buddhist stories of a didactic nature, although the moral lessons soon gave way to the demand for strange and gruesome stories.

=== Examples of kaidanshu ===
- Tonoigusa, called Otogi Monogatari (Nursery Tales) by Ogita Ansei (1660)
- Otogi Boko (Handpuppets) by Asai Ryoi (1666)
- Ugetsu Monogatari (Tales of Moonlight and Rain) by Ueda Akinari (1776)

== Background of the romanized translation ==
The word was popularised in English by Lafcadio Hearn in his book Kwaidan: Stories and Studies of Strange Things. The spelling kwaidan is a romanization based on an archaic spelling of the word in kana - Hearn used it since the stories in the book were equally archaic. The revised Hepburn romanization system is spelled kaidan.

When film director Masaki Kobayashi made his anthology film Kwaidan (1964) from Hearn's translated tales, the old spelling was used in the English title.

== Plot elements ==
Originally based on didactic Buddhist tales, kaidan often involve elements of karma, and especially ghostly vengeance for misdeeds. Japanese vengeful ghosts (Onryō) are far more powerful after death than they were in life, and are often people who were particularly powerless in life, such as women and servants.

This vengeance is usually specifically targeted against the tormentor, but can sometimes be a general hatred toward all living humans. This untargeted wrath can be seen in Furisode, a story in Hearn's book In Ghostly Japan about a cursed kimono that kills everyone who wears it. This motif is repeated in the film Ring with a videotape that kills all who watch it, and the film franchise Ju-on with a house that kills all who enter it.

Kaidan also frequently involve water as a ghostly element. In Japanese religion, water is a pathway to the underworld as can be seen in the festival of Obon.

== See also ==
- Japanese horror – Horror fiction with Japanese themes
- Japanese mythology
- Yōkai – Supernatural beings from Japanese folklore
  - Obake – Type of Yōkai
- Yose – Japanese theatrical form
- Yūrei – Figures in Japanese folklore similar to ghosts
- Kazuo Umezu – Japanese manga artist known for horror manga
- Shigeru Mizuki – Japanese manga artist known for reviving interest in yōkai

Other eastern/Pacific cultures

- Zhiguai xiaoshuo – Chinese supernatural literature
- The Unbelievable – Hong Kong TV program about the paranormal
- Glen Grant – Wrote about Hawaiian mythology

Western

- Aesop's Fables
