= The Ghost of Oyuki =

Painting by Maruyama Ōkyo

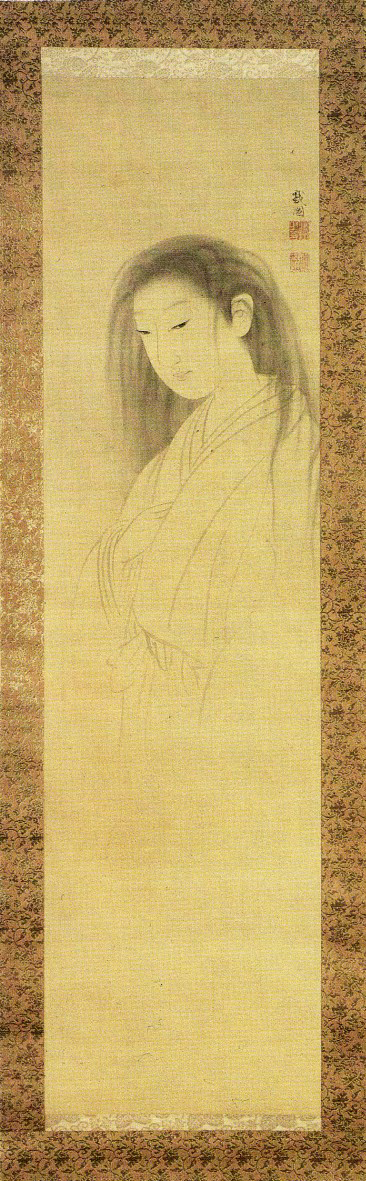
- Artist: Maruyama Ōkyo
- Year: 1750
- Type: Ink on silk

The Ghost of Oyuki (お雪の幻, Oyuki no maboroshi) is a painting of a female yūrei, (a traditional Japanese ghost), by Maruyama Ōkyo (1733–1795), founder of the Maruyama-Shijō school of painting.

According to an inscription on the painting, Okyo had a mistress in the Tominaga Geisha house. She died young and Okyo mourned her death. One night her spirit came to him in a dream. Unable to get her image out of his head, he painted this portrait. This is one of the earliest paintings of a yūrei with the basic late-Edo period ghost characteristics: disheveled hair, white kimono, limp hands, nearly transparent, lack of lower body.
