= Death Forest =

Horror video game

DeathForest〜森からの脱出〜 (DeathForest mori kara no dasshutsu)
- Genre: Horror
- Video game

DeathForest: Escape from the Forest
- Developer: Kazz
- Genre: Survival horror
- Platform: Microsoft Windows
- Released: JP: July 19, 2014
- Video game

DeathForest: Escape from the Forest [Multiplication]
- Developer: Kazz
- Genre: Survival horror
- Platform: Microsoft Windows
- Released: JP: July 15, 2015
- Video game

Utsurundesu
- Developer: Kazz
- Genre: Horror
- Platform: Microsoft Windows
- Released: JP: February 14, 2022
- Video game

Forest of Terror: Shin'en
- Developer: AMGGAMES
- Publisher: AMGGAMES
- Genre: Survival horror
- Platform: Steam
- Released: JP: October 30, 2024
- Video game

Forest of Terror: Liar In The Dark
- Developer: D-1 Lab
- Publisher: D-1 Lab
- Genre: Multiplayer horror
- Platform: Fortnite (Custom Map)
- Released: November 21, 2025
- Video game

Forest of Terror REMAKE
- Developer: AMGGAMES
- Publisher: LITMUS, AMGGAMES
- Genre: Survival horror
- Platform: Nintendo Switch
- Released: JP: December 26, 2025; WW: January 15, 2026

Death Forest (DeathForest〜森からの脱出〜, DeathForest mori kara no dasshutsu) is a Japanese horror game developed by Kazz. It was released on July 14, 2014, for Microsoft Windows.

The game has had further installments, including a 5-part live action film series.

== Gameplay ==
The goal is to escape from the attacking spirits, collect the four motorcycle parts (oil, gasoline, spark plug, and tires) scattered throughout the forest to repair the motorcycle, and then escape. The player must also manage a flashlight they hold, via consistently picking up batteries scattered throughout the forest, otherwise the battery will deplete completely, resulting in a game over.

In Multiplication and Forest Abyss, in addition to motorcycle parts and batteries, there are "bonus files" containing information about the characters and clearing the game while collecting them unlocks bonus content.

In ANOTHER, the setting is that the player has wandered into a mirror world, and the map used is a reversed version of the main game's map. The objective is to avoid a large number of Yoshie while collecting mirror fragments. A double-speed mode has also been added.

== Characters ==
Kazuki Uchida (内田 一輝, Uchida Kazuki)
The 22-year-old protagonist. He gets stranded in the forest after his motorcycle breaks down. He also appears in all of the film adaptations.

Tōka Hiiragi (柊 透花, Hiiragi Tōka)
A high school girl who ventures into the forest after being drawn to the folklore of the neighboring town. She is the protagonist of ANOTHER.

Yoshie Kimura (木村 芳恵, Kimura Yoshie)
Commonly known as "Yoshie." A vengeful spirit who appears 20 seconds after the game starts. Eerie music plays when she gets close, and touching her results in an instant game over. In life, she was a second-year student at Fukui University and a member of the outdoors club. In 2007, she went to explore a cave in the forest with her fellow club member, Ikino, where she got caught up in a brutal murder incident, dying at age 20. Notably, Yoshie's face is an edited photo of the game's creator, Kazz.

Kenji Ōmiya (大宮 健二, Ōmiya Kenji)
Commonly known as "Stalker." A vengeful spirit who appears when you pick up the gasoline inside the maze at the top of the cliff. He chases the player for a while before disappearing over time. His spawn location is different in Zōshoku. In life, he worked in civil engineering. In 2013, while driving through the forest with Sudō and Yoshida due to an urgent matter, they were attacked by Yoshie and others, and he went missing. He died at age 23.

Ren Sudō (須藤 レン, Sudō Ren)
Commonly known as "Stranger." He is located inside the warehouse at the back of the tunnel and moves slowly. In life, he was a third-year high school student in the art club and was close friends with Yoshida, who was in the same club. In 2013, while visiting the forest with Ōmiya and Yoshida, he was attacked by something other than Yoshie while fleeing from her, turning him into an evil spirit. He died at age 18.

Susumu Ryūgasaki (竜ヶ崎 進, Ryūgasaki Susumu)
Commonly known as "UMA." An enemy added in Zōshoku. He is deep inside the concrete maze and appears when you pick up the tire. He has abnormally long limbs and neck, and moves fast. In 1998, he worked in a mine shaft near the forest; after getting into an accident inside, he was murdered a few days later by another worker. He died at age 20.

Chika Yoshida (吉田 知佳, Yoshida Chika)
An earthbound spirit residing in the house at the top of the stairs. She hides inside a locker; after approaching her once and stepping away, she exits the locker, bows, and gives you a single battery. Unlike the other spirits, touching her does not cause a game over. In life, she was a second-year student in the same high school art club as Sudō. After entering the forest with Ōmiya and Sudō and encountering Yoshie, she was stabbed in the back by something lurking in the woods. She hid inside a shed's locker afterward, where she bled to death at age 17.

Daigo Yamamoto (山本 大吾, Yamamoto Daigo)
An enemy added in Shin'en. Commonly known as "Hide Hand." A giant vengeful spirit consisting only of a left arm. It emerges from the ceiling in a specific part of the mine shaft and grabs the player for a game over if they get too close.

David Taylor (デイビッド・テイラー, Deibiddo Teirā)
An enemy added in Shin'en. Commonly known as "Hound." A deformed, quadrupedal monster that appears after escaping the mine shaft. It is characterized by neck skin peeled back like ears and an exposed spine, and it moves quickly.

Unnamed 1 (名称不明1, Meishō Fumei 1)
An evil spirit lurking inside the warehouse where the oil is kept. When approaching the warehouse, it suddenly leaps out from inside. This is the only spirit without a bonus file, so its details remain unknown.

Unnamed 2 (名称不明2, Meishō Fumei 2)
An enemy added in Shin'en. A pitch-black, humanoid vengeful spirit lurking inside the mine shaft. It carries a bladed weapon.

== Games ==
Developed by Kazz, the first game, titled Death Forest: Escape from the Forest (DeathForest〜森からの脱出〜, DeathForest mori kara no dasshutsu), was released for Microsoft Windows on July 14, 2014.

DeathForest: Escape from the Forest [Multiplication] (DeathForest ～森からの脱出～【増殖】, DeathForest mori kara no dasshutsu [zōshoku]) was released for Microsoft Windows on July 15, 2015.

Utsurundesu (写るんです; lit. 'Disposable camera') was released for Microsoft Windows on February 14, 2022.

Forest of Terror: Shin'en (恐怖の森 森淵, Kyōfu no Mori Mori Fukashi), developed by AMGGAMES, was released on Steam on October 31, 2024.

A Fortnite map, titled Forest of Terror: Liar In The Dark (恐怖の森 -Liar In The Dark-, Kyōfu no mori Liar In The Dark), developed by D-1 Lab, a subsidiary of Brave group Inc., was released on November 21, 2025.

Death Forest REMAKE (恐怖の森 REMAKE, Kyōfu no mori REMAKE), developed and published jointly by AMGGAMES and LITMUS, was released for the Nintendo Switch on December 26, 2025. A version titled ANOTHER was released that features Touka Hiiragi as a protagonist, alongside a DLC Death Forest SEIKIN (恐怖の森 SEIKIN), which features a collaboration with SEIKIN. REMAKE was released in English on January 15, 2026.

== Films ==
A 5-part live action film series was released from 2014 to 2016.

=== Death Forest: The Forest of Terror (2014) ===
Death Forest: The Forest of Terror
- デスフォレスト 恐怖の森
- Directed by: Masataka Ichimi
- Cinematography: Masato Sato
- Music by: Flatstrait Smith
- Production company: Japan Skyway
- Distributed by: Nihon Sky Way
- Release date: December 24, 2014 (Japan)
- Running time: 65 minutes
- Country: Japan
- Language: Japanese

Written and directed by Masataka Ichimi, Death Forest: The Forest of Terror (デスフォレスト 恐怖の森, Desuforesuto kyōfu no mori) was released on December 24, 2014, in Japan. The film stars Kazunori Heike, Daijiro Kawaoka, Koichi Kida, Momoko Midorikawa, Ayuka Ohno, Kumiko Shimohigashi, Shogo Tajima, and Yoshinori Tanaka. The film was released on DVD by Broadway on January 7, 2015.

=== Death Forest: Forest of Terror 2 (2015) ===
Death Forest: Forest of Terror 2
- Japanese: デスフォレスト 恐怖の森2
- Directed by: Masataka Ichimi
- Screenplay by: Tsutomu Ogawa
- Produced by: Shû Iwamura
- Cinematography: Takayuki Okazaki
- Music by: Kohei Shigemori
- Production company: Japan Skyway
- Distributed by: Nihon Sky Way
- Release date: March 21, 2015 (Japan)
- Running time: 70 minutes
- Country: Japan
- Language: Japanese

Directed by Masataka Ichimi, with a screenplay by Tsutomu Ogawa, Death Forest: Forest of Terror 2 (デスフォレスト 恐怖の森2, Desuforesuto kyōfu no mori 2) was released on March 21, 2015, in Japan. The film stars Yukino Hashimoto, Daijiro Kawaoka, Yuka Kuramochi, Takeshi Matsunaga, Madoka Shimogaki, Kumiko Shimohigashi, Kaori Suzuki, Ayuka Terada, and Chiharu Tomita. The film was released on DVD by Broadway on April 3, 2015.

=== Death Forest: The Forest of Terror 3 (2015) ===
Death Forest 3
- Japanese: デスフォレスト 恐怖の森3
- Directed by: Yasutake Torii
- Written by: Satoru Okonogi
- Produced by: Hajime Harie
- Music by: Tetsuro Nakano
- Production company: Japan Skyway
- Distributed by: Nihon Sky Way
- Release date: December 12, 2015 (Japan)
- Running time: 64 minutes
- Country: Japan
- Language: Japanese

Directed by Yasutake Torii and written by Satoru Okonogi, Death Forest: The Forest of Terror 3 (デスフォレスト 恐怖の森3, Desuforesuto kyōfu no mori 3) was released on December 12, 2015 in Japan. The film stars Hiroyuki Kajima, Daijiro Kawaoka, Mitsuki Kimijima, Ryutaro Maeda, Daiki Mihara, Kokoro Morita, Runa Natsui, Saki Oku, Takahiro Ono, Madoka Shimogaki, Kumiko Shimohigashi, Kazutaka Takahashi, Toshihiro Tsukui, Yumiko Ueyama, and Narumi Uno. Broadway released the film on DVD on January 8, 2016.

=== Death Forest: The Forest of Terror 4 (2016) ===
Death Forest: The Forest of Terror 4
- Japanese: デスフォレスト 恐怖の森4
- Directed by: Yasutake Torii
- Written by: Satoshi Okonogi
- Produced by: Hajime Harie
- Music by: Yu Namikoshi
- Production company: Japan Skyway
- Distributed by: Nihon Sky Way
- Release date: April 23, 2016 (Japan)
- Running time: 65 minutes
- Country: Japan
- Language: Japanese

Directed by Yasutake Torii and written by Satoru Okonogi, Death Forest: The Forest of Terror 4 (デスフォレスト 恐怖の森4, Desuforesuto kyōfu no mori 4) was released on April 23, 2016, in Japan. The film stars Akari Fujita, Cyborg Kaori, Daijiro Kawaoka, Mitsuki Kimijima, Kota Kosugi, Chappy Ohiwa, Kumiko Shimohigashi, Julia Tomita (her debut film), and Kaoru Yoshinaga. Broadway released the film on DVD on May 3, 2016.

=== Death Forest: The Forest of Terror 5 (2016) ===
Death Forest: The Forest of Terror 5
- Japanese: デスフォレスト 恐怖の森5
- Directed by: Yohei Fukuda; Yuwa Tanaka
- Produced by: Hajime Harie
- Cinematography: Yohei Fukuda
- Production company: Japan Skyway
- Distributed by: Nihon Sky Way
- Release date: September 3, 2016 (Japan)
- Running time: 85 minutes
- Country: Japan
- Language: Japanese

Wriiten and directed by Yohei Fukuda and Yuwa Tanaka, the film was released on September 3, 2016, receiving a limited one-week screening at Eurospace Theater. The film stars Yui Fujimoto, Yasuda Hoka, Kinoshita Aika, Hiroe Igeta, Kosuke Endo (actor), Akifumi Uchida, Western Ryo, Miho Iwamatsu, Shohachi, Takasaki Jiro, Eri Akiyama, Ginjiro, Kaji, Kumiko Shimohigashi, Okusaki Hime, and Daijiro Kawaoka.
