= Yūrei =

Figures in Japanese folklore similar to ghosts

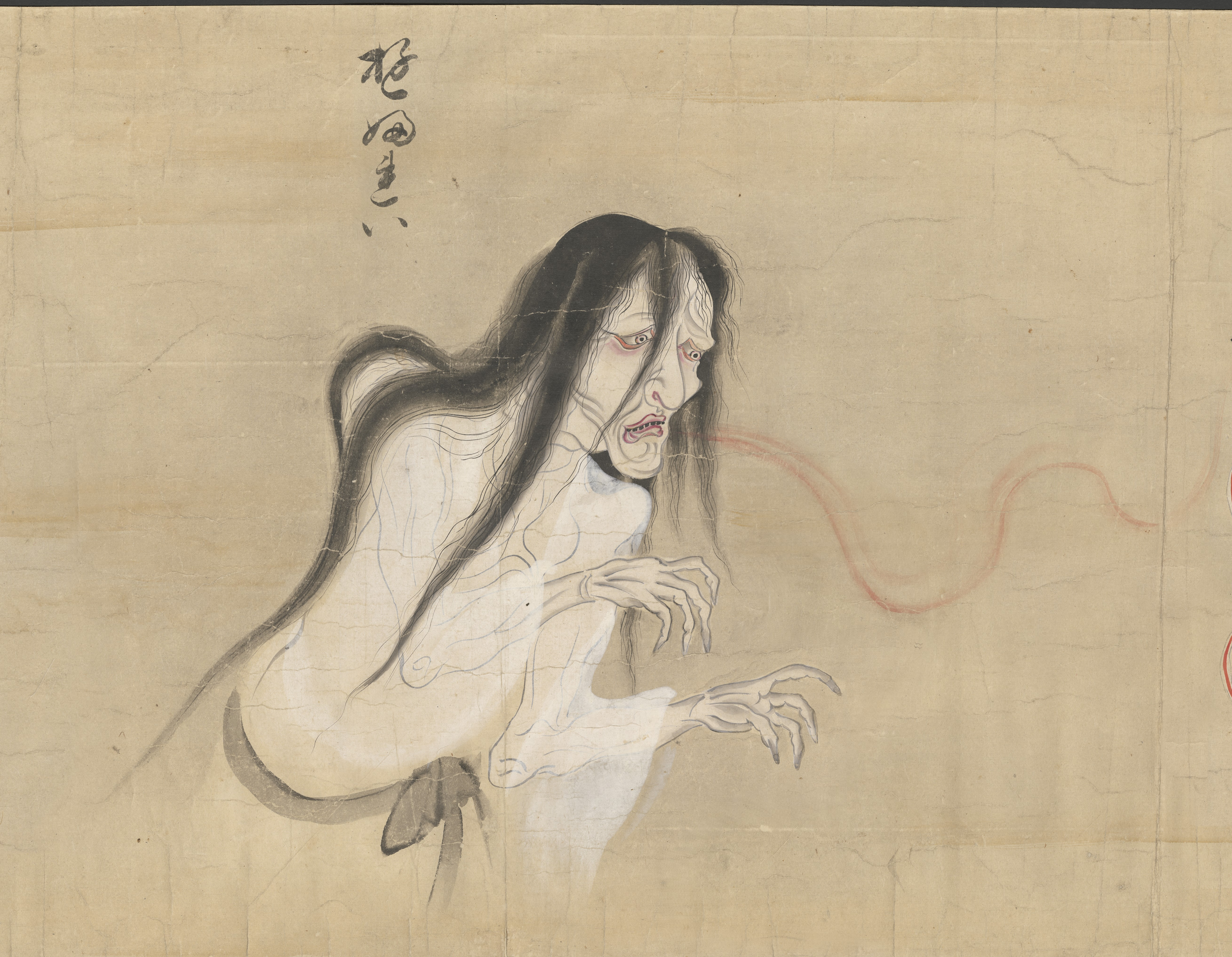
Yūrei, Bakemono no e scroll, Brigham Young University

Yūrei (幽霊) are figures in Japanese folklore analogous to the Western concept of ghosts. The name consists of two kanji, 幽 (yū), meaning "faint" or "dim" and 霊 (rei), meaning "soul" or "spirit". Alternative names include Bōrei (亡霊), meaning ruined or departed spirit, Shiryō (死霊), meaning dead spirit, or the more encompassing Yōkai (妖怪) or Obake (お化け). Like their Western counterparts, they are thought to be spirits barred from a peaceful afterlife.

== Japanese afterlife ==
According to traditional Japanese beliefs, all humans have a spirit or soul called a reikon (霊魂). When a person dies, the reikon leaves the body and enters a form of purgatory, where it waits for the proper funeral and post-funeral rites to be performed so that it may join its ancestors. If this is done correctly, the reikon is believed to be a protector of the living family and to return yearly in August during the Obon Festival to receive thanks.

However, if the person dies in a sudden or violent manner such as murder or suicide, if the proper rites have not been performed, or if they are influenced by powerful emotions such as a desire for revenge, love, jealousy, hatred or sorrow, the reikon is believed to transform into a yūrei which can then bridge the gap back to the physical world. The emotion or thought need not be particularly strong or driven. Even innocuous thoughts can cause death to become disturbed. Once a thought enters the mind of a dying person, their yūrei will come back to complete the action last thought of before returning to the cycle of reincarnation.

The yūrei then exists on Earth until it can be laid to rest, either by performing the missing rituals or resolving the emotional conflict that still ties it to the physical plane. If the rituals are not completed or the conflict left unresolved, the yūrei will persist in its haunting.

Oftentimes the lower the social rank of the person who died violently or who was treated harshly during life, the more powerful as a yūrei they would return. This is illustrated in the fate of Oiwa in the story Yotsuya Kaidan, or the servant Okiku in Banchō Sarayashiki.

== Classifications ==
=== Yūrei ===
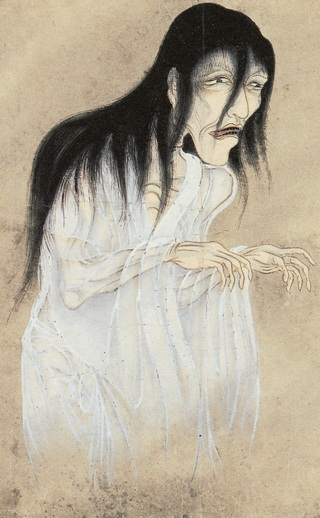
Yūrei from the Hyakkai Zukan, c. 1737

All Japanese ghosts are called yūrei, and there are several types within this classification. However, a given ghost may be described by more than one of the following terms, as the following terms are used differently depending on which elements of a ghost's characteristics are focused on:

- Onryō: The term onryō refers to the spirit of a person who died with a grudge or hatred and was feared by people as bringing disaster through possession.
- Ubume: A mother ghost who died in childbirth, or died leaving young children behind. This yūrei returns to care for her children, often bringing them sweets.
- Goryō: The term "goryō" refers to the spirit of a noble or accomplished person who became an onryō after losing a political power struggle or dying prematurely from an epidemic. It is a type of onryō.
- Funayūrei: The ghosts of those who died at sea. These ghosts are sometimes depicted as scaly fish-like humanoids and some may even have a form similar to that of a mermaid or merman.
- Zashiki-warashi: The ghosts of children, who are described as mischievous and like pulling pranks on the living. They are often mentioned in the local folklore of Iwate Prefecture, and are said to bring good fortune to the houses they inhabit.
- Floating spirits (浮遊霊, Fuyūrei): These spirits do not seek to fulfill an exact purpose and wander around aimlessly. In ancient times, the disease of the Emperor of Japan was thought to arise as a result of these spirits floating in the air. Alternatively, fuyūrei refer to ghosts in which only the body of the deceased has perished and only the soul floats in the air. When used in this sense, onryō and goryō are both types of fuyūrei.
- Earth-bound spirits (地縛霊, Jibakurei): Similar to a fuyūrei and rare, these spirits do not seek to fulfill an exact purpose and are instead bound to a specific place or situation. Famous examples of this include the famous story of Okiku at the well of Himeji Castle and the hauntings in the film Ju-On: The Grudge.

=== Buddhist ghosts ===
There are two types of ghosts specific to Buddhism, both being examples of unfulfilled earthly hungers being carried on after death. They are different from other classifications of yūrei due to their religious nature:

- Gaki
- Jikininki

=== Ikiryō ===
In Japanese folklore, not only the dead are able to manifest their reikon for a haunting. Living creatures possessed by extraordinary jealousy or rage can release their spirit as an ikiryō (生き霊), a living ghost that can enact its will while still alive.

The most famous example of an ikiryo is Rokujō no Miyasundokoro, from the novel The Tale of Genji. A mistress of the titular Genji who falls deeply in love with him, the lady Rokujō is an ambitious woman whose ambition is denied upon the death of her husband. The jealousy she repressed over Genji transformed her slowly into a demon, and then took shape as an ikiryō upon discovering that Genji's wife was pregnant. This ikiryō possessed Genji's wife, ultimately leading to her demise. Upon realising that her jealousy had caused this misfortune, she locked herself away and became a nun until her death, after which time her spirit continued to haunt Genji until her daughter performed the correct spiritual rites.

== Appearance ==
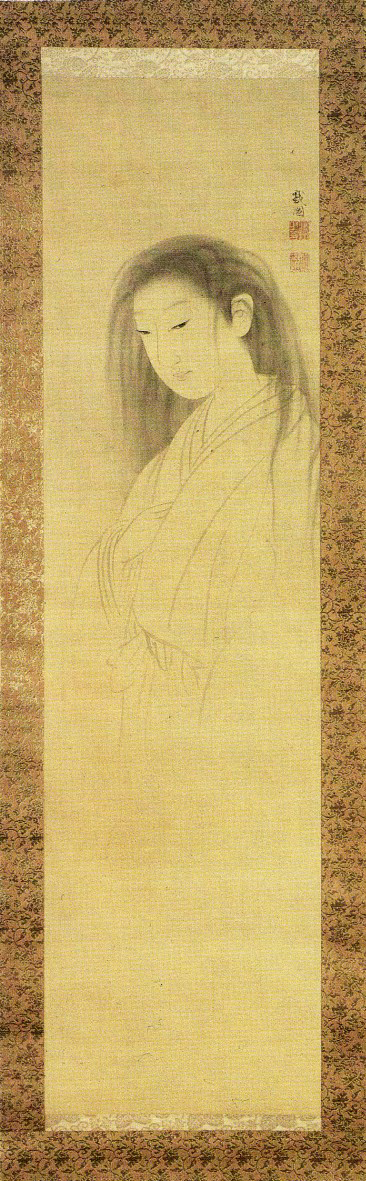
Maruyama Ōkyo's The Ghost of Oyuki

In the late 17th century, a game called Hyakumonogatari Kaidankai became popular, and kaidan increasingly became a subject for theater, literature and other arts. Ukiyo-e artist Maruyama Ōkyo created the first known example of the now-traditional yūrei, in his painting The Ghost of Oyuki. The Zenshō-an in Tokyo houses the largest single collection of yūrei paintings which are only shown in August, the traditional month of the spirits.

Today, the appearance of yūrei is somewhat uniform, instantly signaling the ghostly nature of the figure, and assuring that it is culturally authentic.

- White clothing: Yūrei are usually dressed in white, signifying the white burial kimono used in Edo period funeral rituals. In Shinto, white is a color of ritual purity, traditionally reserved for priests and the dead. This kimono can either be a katabira (a plain, white, unlined kimono) or a kyokatabira (a white katabira inscribed with Buddhist sutras). They are sometimes depicted wearing a tenkan (天冠), a small white triangular piece of cloth typically displayed on the forehead.
- Black hair: The hair of a yūrei is often long, black and disheveled, which some believe to be a trademark carried over from kabuki theater, where wigs are used for all actors. This is a misconception: Japanese women traditionally grew their hair long and wore it pinned up, and it was let down for the funeral and burial.
- Hands and feet: The hands of a yūrei are said to dangle lifelessly from the wrists, which are held outstretched with the elbows near the body. They typically lack legs and feet, floating in the air. These features originated in Edo period ukiyo-e prints, and were quickly copied over to kabuki. In kabuki, this lack of legs and feet is often represented by using a very long kimono or even hoisting the actor into the air by a series of ropes and pulleys.
- Hitodama: Yūrei are frequently depicted as being accompanied by a pair of floating flames or will o' the wisps (hitodama in Japanese) in eerie colors such as blue, green, or purple. These ghostly flames are separate parts of the ghost rather than independent spirits.

== Hauntings ==
Yūrei often fall under the general umbrella term of obake, derived from the verb bakeru, meaning "to change"; thus obake are preternatural beings who have undergone some sort of change, from the natural realm to the supernatural.

However, yūrei differ from traditional bakemono due to their temporal specificity. The yūrei is one of the only creatures in Japanese mythology to have a preferred haunting time (midtime of the hours of the Ox; around 2:00 am–2:30 am, when the veils between the world of the dead and the world of the living are at their thinnest). By comparison, normal obake could strike at any time, often darkening or changing their surroundings should they feel the need. Similarly, yūrei are more bound to specific locations of haunting than the average bakemono, which are free to haunt any place without being bound to it.

Yanagita Kunio generally distinguishes yūrei from obake by noting that yūrei tend to have a specific purpose for their haunting, such as vengeance or completing unfinished business. While for many yūrei this business is concluded, some yūrei, such as Okiku, remain earthbound due to the fact that their business is not possible to complete. In the case of Okiku, this business is counting plates hoping to find a full set, but the last plate is invariably missing or broken according to the different retellings of the story. This means that their spirit can never find peace, and thus will remain a jibakurei.

=== Famous hauntings ===
Some famous locations that are said to be haunted by yūrei are the well of Himeji Castle, haunted by the ghost of Okiku, and Aokigahara, the forest at the bottom of Mount Fuji, which is a popular location for suicide. A particularly powerful onryō, known as Oiwa, is said to be able to bring vengeance on any actress portraying her part in a theater or film adaptation.

Okiku, Oiwa, and the lovesick Otsuyu together make up the San O-Yūrei (三大幽霊; "three great Yūrei") of Japanese culture. These are yūrei whose stories have been passed down and retold throughout the centuries, and whose characteristics along with their circumstances and fates have formed a large part of Japanese art and society.

== Exorcism ==
The easiest way to exorcise a yūrei is to help it fulfill its purpose. When the reason for the strong emotion binding the spirit to Earth is gone, the yūrei is satisfied and can move on. Traditionally, this is accomplished by family members enacting revenge upon the yūrei's slayer, or when the ghost consummates its passion/love with its intended lover, or when its remains are discovered and given a proper burial with all rites performed.

The emotions of the onryō are particularly strong, and they are the least likely to be pacified by these methods.

On occasion, Buddhist priests and mountain ascetics were hired to perform services on those whose unusual or unfortunate deaths could result in their transition into a vengeful ghost, a practice similar to exorcism. Sometimes these ghosts would be deified in order to placate their spirits.

Like many monsters of Japanese folklore, malicious yūrei are repelled by ofuda (御札), holy Shinto writings containing the name of a kami. The ofuda must generally be placed on the yūrei's forehead to banish the spirit, although they can be attached to a house's entry ways to prevent the yūrei from entering.

== See also ==
- Bancho Sarayashiki
- Botan Doro – Japanese ghost story
- Funayūrei
- Hungry ghost
- Inoue Enryō – Japanese philosopher and educator
- Japanese mythology
- Japanese urban legends
- J-Horror
- Kaidan – Japanese word for "ghost story"
- List of ghosts
- Restless ghost
- Shinigami – Kami of death
- Yōkai – Supernatural beings from Japanese folklore
- Yotsuya Kaidan – Japanese ghost story of betrayal
- Yūrei zaka – Hill road in Minato, Tokyo
