= The Unbelievable =

- Hosts and guests talking about paranormal activities
- Genre: Paranormal TV, Talk show, Reality TV
- Starring: Hong Kong citizens
- Country of origin: Hong Kong
- Original language: Cantonese

Production
- Running time: approx. 45 minutes to 1 hour

Original release
- Network: Cable TV Hong Kong
- Release: 1996

The Unbelievable (Chinese: 怪談, Gwai Tam) is a Hong Kong TV program about paranormal and other supernatural occurrences mostly in Hong Kong and nearby East Asia countries. It is generally based on Eastern Buddhist, Taoist or Chinese spiritual supernatural perspective, though not limited to these philosophies.

== Name ==
The Chinese name of the show, 怪談, literally means "Strange Talk" ('Gwaai3 Taam4' in Cantonese). The characters are also used for the Japanese word of Kaidan.

== Format ==
Generally the format follows that of a reality show where live video taping is done in areas with paranormal activities or hauntings. Sometimes re-enactments or experiments are done to explain a specific phenomenon or sightings. At the end of the episodes, live call-ins allow home viewers to ask questions or inform others about their personal experiences. Many guests, fans and specialists are invited to join the programming to provide expertise or participate. The long term success of the show has expanded to fan clubs.

== Host ==
- Generation 1: Simon Lui (雷宇揚)
- Generation 2: Si ming (施明)
- Generation 3: Si ming (施明), Emily Kwan (關寶慧), Nelson Cheung (張學潤)
- Generation 4: Spencer Leung (梁思浩), Monique Au (歐綺霞)
- Generation 5: Spencer Leung (梁思浩), Kaki Leung(梁嘉琪)
- Generation 6: Spencer Leung (梁思浩), Sammie Yue (余思敏) and Rachel Chen (陳曉華).
- Generation 7: Sammie Yue (余思敏), Rachel Chen (陳曉華)
- Generation 8: Spencer Leung (梁思浩), Natalie Mitchell (可宜), Zoie Tam (譚凱琪), Cammi Tse (谢芷蕙), Nelson Cheung (張學潤), Josephine Shum (岑寶兒)
- Generation 9: Spencer Leung (梁思浩), Rain Lau Yuk Tsui (劉玉翠), Lukian Wang (王寶寶)
- Generation 10: Spencer Leung (梁思浩), Maggie Lee (李曼筠), Howard Chan (陳皓雲)

== Topics ==
A very wide range of topics have been covered by the show. Below are some samples

- After death revisits
- Out of body experiences
- Eastern style exorcism
- Ghosts and relationships
- Hauntings
- Spiritual communications
- Bewitching
- Reincarnations
- Proper burial and funeral methods
- Tools and equipment analysis
- Practices, procedures

== Film ==
Some hosts showed in similar film The Unbelievable (2009) some differences in its Hong Kong and Singapore/Malaysia versions.
