= Yotsuya Kaidan =

Japanese ghost story of betrayal

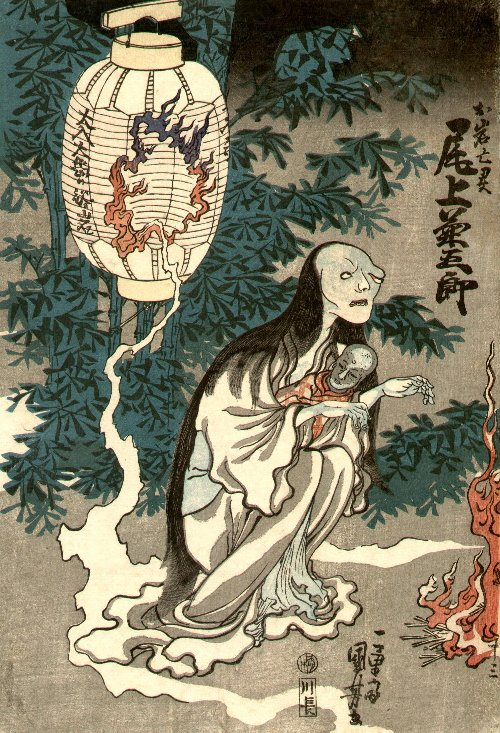
Utagawa Kuniyoshi's portrait of Oiwa.

Yotsuya Kaidan (四谷怪談), the story of Oiwa and Tamiya Iemon, (Note: Iemon is sometimes romanized as Iyemon, due to Hepburn's old romanization system that rendered e as ye. This romanization gives a more archaic feel to the name (and also makes it less likely to be misread by Westerners as "Lemon").) is a tale of betrayal, murder and onryō (a revenant).

Arguably the most famous kaidan (Japanese ghost story) of all time, Yotsuya Kaidan has been adapted to film over 30 times and continues to influence Japanese horror today. Written in 1825 by Tsuruya Nanboku IV as a kabuki play, the original title was Tōkaidō Yotsuya Kaidan (東海道四谷怪談, Ghost Story of Yotsuya in Tokaido). It is now generally shortened, and loosely translates as Ghost Story of Yotsuya. (Note: Yotsuya is a neighborhood in the southeastern section of Tokyo's Shinjuku ward.)

== History ==
First staged in July 1825, Yotsuya Kaidan appeared at the Nakamuraza Theater in Edo (now Tokyo) as a double feature with the immensely popular Forty-seven rōnin. Normally, with a Kabuki double-feature, the first play is staged in its entirety, followed by the second play. However, in the case of Yotsuya Kaidan, it was decided to interweave the two dramas, with a full staging on two days: the first day started with Kanadehon Chushingura from Act I to Act VI, followed by Tōkaidō Yotsuya Kaidan from Act I to Act III. The following day started with the Onbo canal scene, followed by Kanadehon Chushingura from Act VII to Act XI, then came Act IV and Act V of Tōkaidō Yotsuya Kaidan to conclude the program.

The play was incredibly successful, and forced the producers to schedule extra out-of-season performances to meet demand. The story tapped into people's fears by bringing the ghosts of Japan out of the temples and aristocrats' mansions and into the homes of common people, the exact type of people who were the audience of his theater.

== Story ==
As the most-adapted Japanese ghost story, the details of Yotsuya Kaidan have been altered over time, often bearing little resemblance to the original kabuki play, and sometimes removing the ghostly element altogether. However, the base story usually remains the same and recognizable.

(Note: the following summary is of the original 1825 Nakamuraza production. As such, it does not detail the numerous subplots and characters added to the story over the intervening years.)

=== Act 1 ===
Tamiya Iemon (Iemon's name is sometimes romanized as Iyemon), a rōnin, is having a heated exchange with his father-in-law, Yotsuya Samon, concerning Samon's daughter Oiwa. After it is suggested by Samon that Iemon and his daughter should separate, the ronin becomes enraged and murders Samon. The next scene focuses on the character Naosuke who is sexually obsessed with Oiwa's sister, the prostitute Osode, despite her being already married to another man, Satô Yomoshichi. As this scene begins, Naosuke is at the local brothel making romantic advances toward Osode when Yomoshichi and the brothel's owner, Takuetsu, enter. Unable to pay a fee demanded by Takuetsu, he is mocked by both Yomoshichi and Osode and forcibly removed. Shortly afterwards he kills his former master, whom he mistakes for Yomoshichi, at the precise time of the slaying of Samon. It is at this point that Iemon and Naosuke unite and conspire to mislead Oiwa and Osode into believing that they will exact revenge on the people responsible for their father's death. In return, Osode agrees to marry Naosuke.

=== Act 2 ===
Oume, the granddaughter of Itô Kihei, has fallen in love with Iemon. However, believing herself to be less attractive than Oiwa, she doesn't think Iemon will ever want to become her husband. Sympathizing with Oume's plight, the Itôs scheme to have Oiwa disfigured by sending her a topical poison disguised as a facial cream. Oiwa, unbeknownst to her at the time, is instantly scarred by the cream when she applies it. Upon seeing his wife's ghastly new countenance, Iemon decides he can no longer remain with her. He asks Takuetsu to rape Oiwa so that he will have an honorable basis for divorce. Takuetsu cannot bring himself to do this, so instead he simply shows Oiwa her reflection in a mirror. Realizing that she has been deceived, Oiwa becomes hysterical and, picking up a sword, runs towards the door. Takuetsu moves to grab her but Oiwa, attempting to evade him, accidentally punctures her own throat with the sword's tip. As she lies bleeding to death before a stunned Takuetsu, she curses Iemon's name. Not long after, Iemon becomes engaged to Oume. Act 2 closes with Iemon being tricked by Oiwa's ghost into slaying both Oume and her grandfather on the night of the wedding.

=== Act 3 ===
The remaining members of the Itô household are annihilated. Iemon kicks Oyumi, the mother of Oume, into the Onbô Canal and Omaki, the servant of Oyumi, drowns by accident. Naosuke arrives in disguise as Gonbei, an eel vendor, and blackmails Iemon into handing over a valuable document. Iemon contemplates his prospects while fishing at the Onbô canal. On the embankment above the canal, Iemon, Yomoshichi and Naosuke appear to fumble as they struggle for possession of a note which passes from hand to hand in the darkness.

=== Act 4 ===
At the opening Naosuke is pressuring Osode to consummate their marriage, to which she seems oddly averse. Yomoshichi appears and accuses Osode of adultery. Osode resigns herself to death in atonement and convinces Naosuke and Yomoshichi that they should kill her. She leaves a farewell note from which Naosuke learns that Osode was his younger sister. For the shame of this, as well as for the killing of his former master, he commits suicide.

=== Act 5 ===
Iemon, still haunted by the ghost of Oiwa, flees to an isolated mountain retreat. There he rapidly descends into madness as his dreams and reality begin to merge and Oiwa's haunting intensifies. The act closes with Yomoshichi slaying Iemon out of both vengeance and compassion.

== Historical basis ==
Nanboku incorporated two sensational and real-life murders into Yotsuya Kaidan, combining fact and fiction in a manner that resonated with audiences. The first involved two servants who had murdered their respective masters. They were caught and executed on the same day. The second murder was from a samurai who discovered his concubine was having an affair with a servant. The samurai had the faithless concubine and servant nailed to a wooden board and thrown into the Kanda River.

== Popularity ==
Yotsuya Kaidan's popularity is often accounted for by the way it fit the mood of its time, as well as its use of universal themes. The Bunsei era was a time of social unrest, and women's repressed position in society was severe. The exchange of power for powerlessness was something audiences could relate to. Oiwa went from a delicate victim to a mighty avenger, while Iemon transforms from tormentor to tormented.

Also, Oiwa is much more direct in her vengeance than Okiku, another popular kabuki ghost from the Banchō Sarayashiki, and she is much more brutal. This added level of violence thrilled audiences, who were seeking more and more violent forms of entertainment.

In addition, the performance of Yotsuya Kaidan was filled with fantastic special effects, with her ruined face projecting magnificently from an onstage lantern, and her hair falling out in impossible amounts.

Yotsuya Kaidan paired the conventions of kizewamono "raw life play", which looked at the lives of non-nobles, and kaidanmono "ghost play".

== Ghost of Oiwa ==
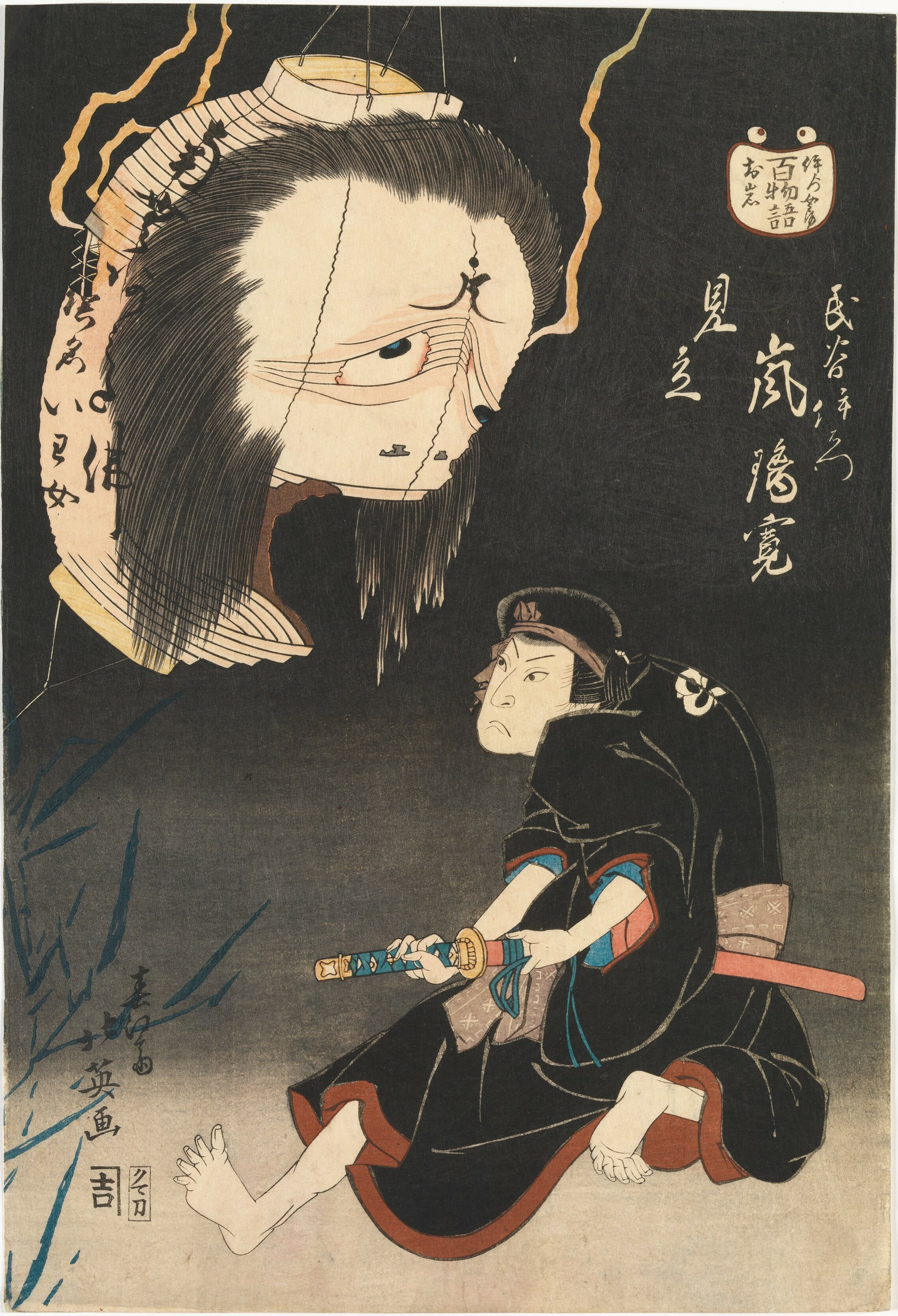
Hokusai's image of Oiwa emerging from the Lantern.

Oiwa is an onryō, a ghost who seeks vengeance. Her strong passion for revenge allows her to bridge the gap back to Earth. She shares most of the common traits of this style of Japanese ghost, including the white dress representing the burial kimono she would have worn, the long, ragged hair and white/indigo face that marks a ghost in kabuki theater.

There are specific traits to Oiwa that set her apart physically from other onryou. Most famous is her left eye, which droops down her face due to poison given her by Iemon. This feature is exaggerated in kabuki performances to give Oiwa a distinct appearance. She is often shown as partially bald, another effect of the poison. In a spectacular scene in the kabuki play, the living Oiwa sits before a mirror and combs her hair, which comes falling out due to the poison. This scene is a subversion of erotically charged hair combing scenes in kabuki love plays. The hair piles up to tremendous heights, achieved by a stage hand who sits under the stage and pushes more and more hair up through the floor while Oiwa is combing.

Oiwa is supposedly buried at a temple, Myogyo-ji, in Sugamo, a neighborhood of Tokyo. The date of her death is listed as February 22, 1636. Several productions of Yotsuya Kaidan, including television and movie adaptations, have reported mysterious accidents, injuries and even deaths. Prior to staging an adaptation of Yotsuya Kaidan it is now a tradition for the principal actors and the director to make a pilgrimage to Oiwa's grave and ask her permission and blessing for their production. This is considered especially important of the actor assuming the role of Oiwa.

Sadako Yamamura from the film Ring is a clear homage to Oiwa. Her final appearance is a direct adaptation of Oiwa, including the cascading hair and drooping, malformed eye. Also in Ju-On, when Hitomi is watching the television, the television presenter is morphed into a woman with one small eye and one large eye, possibly a reference to Oiwa.

== Yotsuya Kaidan and ukiyo-e ==
Being a popular Kabuki play, Yotsuya Kaidan soon became a popular subject for ukiyo-e artists as well. In 1826, the same year the play opened at Sumiza Theater in Osaka, Shunkosai Hokushu produced The Ghost of Oiwa. She is recognizable by her drooping eyes and partial baldness.

An unusual image featuring a still-living Oiwa was depicted as one of the New Forms of Thirty-Six Ghosts by Tsukioka Yoshitoshi.

Katsushika Hokusai created perhaps the most iconic image of Oiwa, in his series One Hundred Ghost Stories, in which he drew the face of her angry spirit merged with a temple lantern. Shunkosai Hokuei made a visual quotation of Hokusai's design in the illustration above, including Iemon as he turns to meet the apparition, drawing his sword. The lantern scene is a favorite, also being carved into netsuke. This image of Oiwa appears to give Akari Ichijou a cup of tea in her victory pose in the arcade game The Last Blade.

Utagawa Kuniyoshi illustrated the scene at Hebiyama, showing a still-lantern-headed Oiwa coming for Iemon, surrounded by snakes and smoke.

== Film adaptations ==
The first film adaptation was made in 1912, and it was filmed some 18 times between 1913 and 1937. A notable adaptation was Shimpan Yotsuya Kaidan by Itō Daisuke, one of the foremost Japanese directors of his time.

A 1949 adaptation, The New Version of the Ghost of Yotsuya (Shinshaku Yotsuya kaidan), by Kinoshita Keisuke removed the ghostly elements and presented Oiwa as an apparition of her husband's guilty psyche. It was also known as The Phantom of Yotsuya.

The Shintoho studio produced Nobuo Nakagawa's 1959 Ghost of Yotsuya (Tokaido Yotsuya kaidan), which is often considered by critics to be the finest screen adaptation of the story. Toho produced a version of Ghost of Yotsuya in 1965 directed by Shirō Toyoda and starring Tatsuya Nakadai that was released as Illusion of Blood abroad. In 1994, Kinji Fukasaku returned to the Kabuki roots and combined the stories of Chūshingura and Yotsuya Kaidan into the single Crest of Betrayal. In 2026, Anna Biller adapted the story to 14th-century England for her Technicolor Gothic horror film The Face of Horror.

There have also been adaptations on television. Story 1 of the Japanese television drama Kaidan Hyaku Shosetsu was a version of Yotsuya Kaidan, and episodes 1–4 of Ayakashi: Samurai Horror Tales, a 2006 anime television series, were also a retelling of the story. Some critics have identified loose connections between the story of Oiwa and the plot of the Ju-On films.

== See also ==
- Banchō Sarayashiki
- Botan Dōrō
- Japanese mythology
- Macbeth
- Obake
- Onryō
- The Legend of Sleepy Hollow
- Vengeful ghost
- Yūrei
