= Onryō =

Type of Japanese ghost

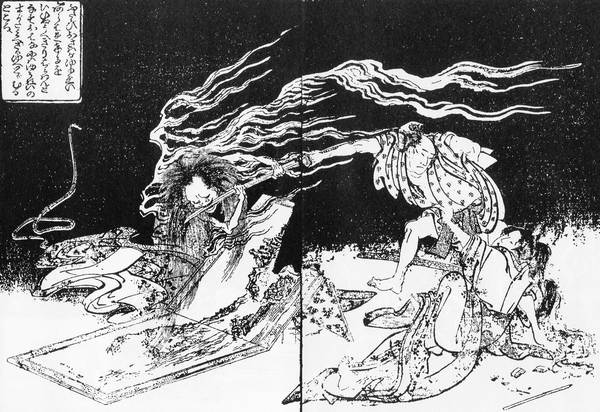
Depiction of an onryō in the Kinsei-Kaidan-Shimoyonohoshi (近世怪談霜夜星), by Katsushika Hokusai.

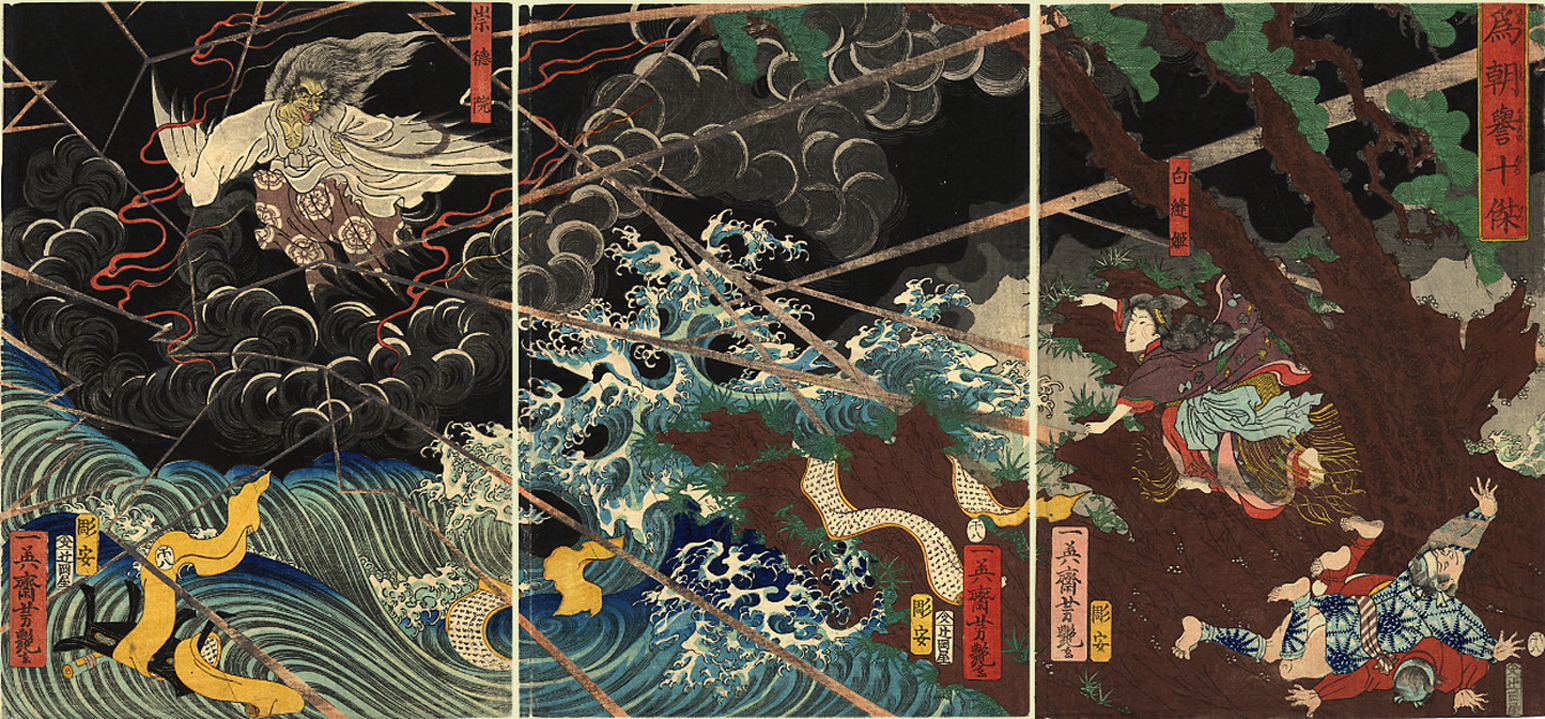
Ukiyo-e by Utagawa Yoshitsuya depicts the moment when Emperor Sutoku, who died in exile, became an onryō.

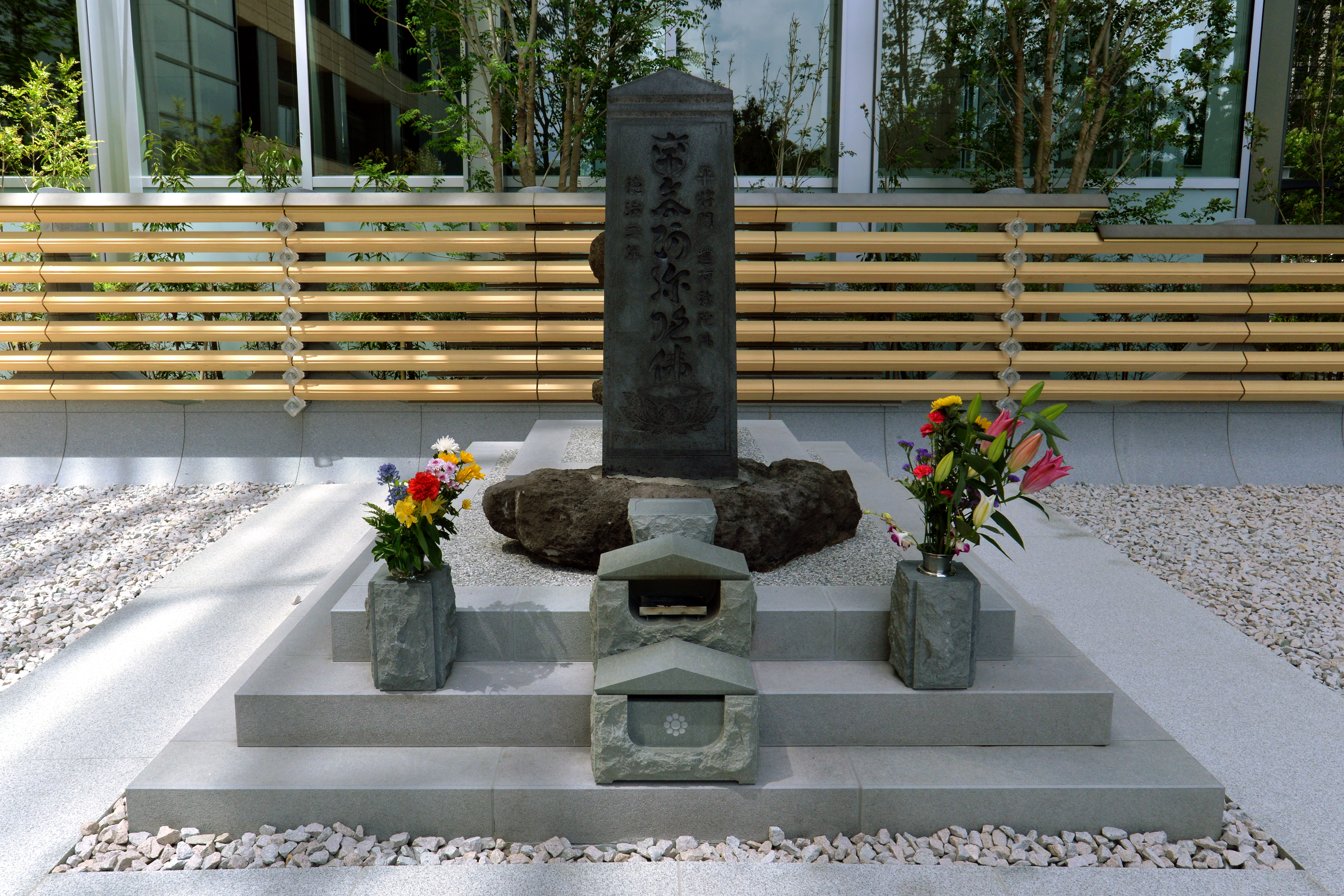
The headstone of Taira no Masakado, located between the skyscrapers of Ōtemachi near Tokyo Station, was renovated in 2021 when the surrounding skyscrapers were rebuilt, but the headstone was never moved.

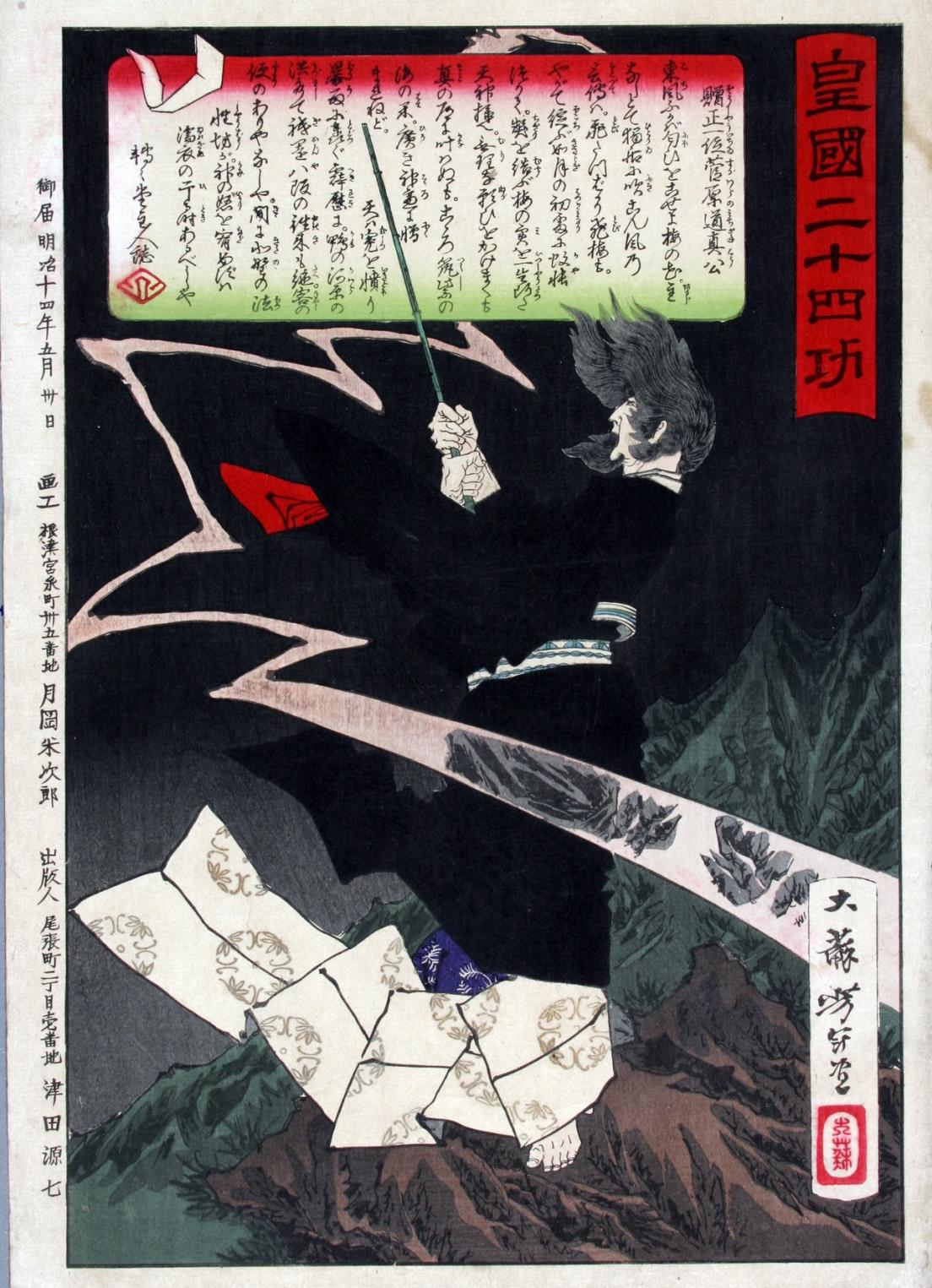
Ukiyo-e by Tsukioka Yoshitoshi depicting Sugawara no Michizane as the Tenjin (kami of thunder). After Sugawara no Michizane's death, lightning struck the palace, killing and injuring many of the powerful people involved in his banishment, and Sugawara no Michizane was enshrined in the Tenmangū (Shinto shrines) as the Tenjin.

In Japanese traditional beliefs and literature, onryō (怨霊, lit. 'vengeful spirit', sometimes rendered "wrathful spirits", "hatred spirits", "resentful spirits", "ruthless spirits", "envious spirits", "dark spirits", "fallen spirits", or "downcast spirits") are a type of ghost (yūrei) believed to be capable of causing harm in the world of the living, injuring or killing enemies, or even causing natural disasters to exact vengeance to "redress" the wrongs they received while alive, then taking their spirits from their dying bodies. Onryō are often depicted as wronged women, who are traumatized, envious, disappointed, bitter, or just infuriated by what happened during life and exact revenge in death. These kinds of ghosts appear extremely vengeful, cruel, deranged, egotistical, bloodthirsty, and heartless.

Emperor Sutoku, Taira no Masakado, and Sugawara no Michizane are called the Three Great Onryō of Japan (日本三大怨霊, Nihon Sandai Onryō) because they are considered to be the most powerful and revered onryō in Japanese history. After they died with resentment and anger, there was a series of deaths of political opponents, natural disasters, and wars, and the rulers enshrined them as kami and deified them in Shinto shrines to appease the resentment and anger that had turned them into onryō.

Onryō are used as subjects in various traditional Japanese performing arts such as Noh, Kabuki, and Rakugo; For example, hannya is a Noh mask representing a female onryō.

The reverence for onryō has been passed down to the present day. The head mound of Taira no Masakado (将門塚, Masakado-zuka or Shōmon-zuka), located between skyscrapers near Tokyo Station, was to be moved several times as part of urban redevelopment projects, but each move resulted in the death of a construction worker and a series of accidents. Although the buildings surrounding the Taira no Masakado mound have been rebuilt many times, the mound has remained intact between the high-rise buildings. Even today, the mound is carefully maintained.

The term goryō (御霊) is often used as a synonym for onryō, but the term goryō is more commonly used to refer to the onryō that have become the object of the people's reverence after a noble person has died a politically unjust death. Goryō Shinko (御霊信仰) refers to the belief that the onryō of people who have died unfortunate deaths cause hauntings and disasters, and the belief that they are enshrined as kami to appease them.

== Origin ==
While the origin of onryō is unclear, belief in their existence can be traced back to the 8th century and was based on the idea that powerful and enraged souls of the dead could influence, harm, and kill the living. The earliest onryō cult that developed was around Prince Nagaya who died in 729; and the first record of possession by the onryō spirit affecting health is found in the chronicle Shoku Nihongi (797), which states that "Fujiwara Hirotsugu (藤原広嗣)'s soul harmed Genbō to death" (Hirotsugu having died in a failed insurrection, named the "Fujiwara no Hirotsugu Rebellion", after failing to remove his rival, the priest Genbō, from power).

== Vengeance ==
According to the belief of Ikiryō, a person's soul or spirit exists naturally when it is stable or in balance. When too much hatred or resentment brews, it can become separated from the body, resulting in the spirit becoming an onryō. This can also occur in individuals who died an untimely death.

Traditionally in Japan, onryō driven by vengeance were thought capable of causing not only their enemy's death, as in the case of Hirotsugu's vengeful spirit held responsible for killing the priest Genbō, but also causing natural disasters such as earthquakes, fires, storms, drought, famine and pestilence, as in the case of Prince Sawara's spirit embittered against his brother, the Emperor Kanmu. In common parlance, such vengeance exacted by supernatural beings or forces is termed tatari (祟り).

The Emperor Kanmu had accused his brother Sawara, possibly falsely, of plotting to remove him from the throne. Sawara was then exiled, and died by fasting. According to a number of scholars, the reason that the Emperor moved the capital to Nagaoka-kyō thence to Kyoto was an attempt to avoid the wrath of his brother's spirit, according to a number of scholars. This not succeeding entirely, the emperor tried to lift the curse by appeasing his brother's ghost, by performing Buddhist rites to pay respect, and granting Prince Sawara the posthumous title of emperor.

A well-known example of appeasement of the onryō spirit is the case of Sugawara no Michizane, who had been politically disgraced and died in exile. It was believed to cause the death of his calumniators in quick succession, as well as catastrophes (especially lightning damage), and the court tried to appease the wrathful spirit by restoring Michizane's old rank and position. Michizane became deified in the cult of the Tenjin, with Tenman-gū shrines erected around him.

=== Examples ===
Possibly the most famous onryō is Oiwa, from the Yotsuya Kaidan. In this story, the husband remains unharmed; however, he is the target of the onryō's vengeance. Oiwa's vengeance on him is not physical retribution, but rather psychological torment.

Other examples include:

How a Man's Wife Became a Vengeful Ghost and How Her Malignity Was Diverted by a Master of Divination
In this tale from the medieval collection Konjaku Monogatarishū, an abandoned wife is found dead with a full head of hair intact and her bones still attached. The husband, fearing retribution from her spirit, asks a diviner for aid. The husband must endure while grabbing her hair and riding astride her corpse. She complains of the heavy load and leaves the house to "go looking" (presumably for her husband), but after a day, she gives up and returns, after which the diviner is able to complete her exorcism with an incantation.
Of a Promise Broken
In this tale from the Izumo area recorded by Lafcadio Hearn, a samurai vows to his dying wife never to remarry. He soon breaks this promise, and the ghost of the deceased wife murders her husband's new young bride, ripping her head off. A watchman chases down the apparition, and, while slashing his sword, recites a Buddhist prayer, destroying the ghost of the dead wife.

== In mass media ==
The onryō is a staple of the J-Horror genre, most notable being Sadako Yamamura and Kayako Saeki from the Ring and Ju-On franchises, respectively. The characters in these works are usually women who were wronged in life and returned as onryō to wreak havoc on the living and obtain revenge.

- In The Ring, Sadako Yamamura is the main antagonist. Her origin is from the Ring novel series by Koji Suzuki, where she haunts and kills people through tapes on a television. It is revealed that she was killed by a doctor who infected her with smallpox, and then sealed her body in a well. Before Sadako dies, she promises to take revenge on the world, and becomes an onryō.
- The aforementioned Yotsuya Kaidan has been made into numerous movies and retold many times over the course of Japanese history. The story revolves around Tamiya Iemon and his wife Oiwa. Their relationship is not a happy one, and through some set of circumstances, Iemon gives Oiwa a powder that permanently disfigures her face. Upon realizing this, Oiwa takes her own life and that of her baby. After her death, she comes back to haunt Iemon and his new wife, becoming an onryō.
- Banchō Sarayashiki is another Japanese ghost story that has been retold many ways. In this story, Okiku, a beautiful maid, is the target of desire for the samurai whose house she works at, Aoyama Tessan. She continually refuses his advances, and in a fit of rage, Tessan hides one of ten expensive plates that Okiku is in charge of counting. When Okiku cannot find the tenth plate, she recounts them obsessively, panicking more each time. Tessan tells her he will forgive her losing the plate if she becomes his mistress, but even then, she refuses him. At her refusal, Tessan throws her into a well on the property, where she dies. After this, every night Okiku rises from the well, softly counting to nine, and then letting out a horrendous shriek once she reaches ten. She has become an onryō.
- Hisako (久子; "Eternal Child" or "Everlasting Child"), from the third entry of the fighting game Killer Instinct, is an onryō who died while defending her village. She still haunts her old village and will take vengeance on anyone who desecrates its ruins with her naginata. She has pale white skin and long black hair like most onryō.
- In 2018, the asymmetrical horror game Dead by Daylight released the Shattered Bloodline chapter DLC, and with it came Rin Yamaoka, The Spirit. The Spirit is an onryō who returns from the dead after being brutally murdered by her father. In March 2022, Sadako Yamamura was added as a playable character.
- The term onryō is also present in the game Phasmophobia. It is one of twenty-nine ghost types that the player can identify, and is noted for treating lit candles like an evil eye repulsing charm.
- Yoshie Kimura, the main antagonist from Death Forest, is an onryō. She died when exploring the forest with her classmate, from being beaten to death by an unknown person.
- Mizu, the protagonist of the 2023 Netflix series Blue Eye Samurai shares many similarities with, and is often compared diegetically to, an onryō.
- In Jujutsu Kaisen, the Gojo clan is said to have descended from the onryō Sugawara no Michizane.
- The character Hanzo from the Overwatch franchise received a skin simply titled "onryō".
- The protagonist of the PlayStation 5 game, Ghost of Yōtei, employs the image and mythology of onryō for her campaign of revenge.
- in the film Godzilla, Mothra and King Ghidorah, Godzilla is described as a onryō.

== Physical appearance ==
Traditionally, onryō and other yūrei (ghosts) had no particular appearance. However, with the rising of popularity of kabuki during the Edo period, a specific costume was developed.

Highly visual in nature, and with a single actor often assuming various roles within a play, kabuki developed a system of visual shorthand that allowed the audience to instantly recognize which character is on stage, as well as emphasize the emotions and expressions of the actor.

A ghost costume consisted of three main elements:

- White burial kimono (白装束, shiro-shōzoku) or shini-shōzoku (死に装束). This garment was also worn during seppuku.
- Wild, unkempt long black hair that often hides their face until they choose to reveal it.
- Face makeup consisting of white foundation (oshiroi) coupled with dramatic face painting (kumadori) of blue shadows (藍隈, aiguma) "indigo fringe", much like villains are depicted in kabuki makeup artistry. (Note: In addition to blue, brown shadows (代赭隈, taishaguma) "red ochre fringe" or black kumadori (日本博学倶楽部 2005, p. 57) are also used.)

== See also ==
- Eidolon
- Fatal Frame (video game series)
- Ikiryō
- Ghosts in Vietnamese culture
- Japanese urban legends
- Kayako Saeki
- List of ghosts
- List of supernatural beings in Chinese folklore
- Muoi: The Legend of a Portrait (film)
- Neko-dera
- S-Ko
- Sadako Yamamura
- Taira no Masakado
- Vengeful ghost

== Bibliography ==
- Iwasaka, Michiko and Toelken, Barre. Ghosts and the Japanese: Cultural Experiences in Japanese Death Legends, Utah State University Press, 1994. ISBN 0-87421-179-4
