= Obake =

Type of Yōkai

Obake (お化け) and bakemono (化け物) are a class of yōkai, preternatural creatures in Japanese folklore. Literally, the terms mean a thing that changes, referring to a state of transformation or shapeshifting.

These words are often translated as "ghost", but primarily they refer to living things or supernatural beings who have taken on a temporary transformation, and these bakemono are distinct from the spirits of the dead. However, as a secondary usage, the term obake can be a synonym for yūrei, the ghost of a deceased human being.

A bakemono's true form may be an animal such as a fox (kitsune), a raccoon dog (bake-danuki), a badger (mujina), a transforming cat (bakeneko), the spirit of a plant—such as a kodama, or an inanimate object which may possess a soul in Shinto. Obake derived from household objects are often called tsukumogami.

A bakemono usually either disguises itself as a human or appears in a strange or terrifying form such as a hitotsume-kozō, an ōnyūdō, or a noppera-bō. In common usage, any bizarre apparition can be referred to as a bakemono or an obake whether it is believed to have some other form, making the terms roughly synonymous with yōkai.

== In Hawaii ==
Due to the influence of a large number of Hawaiians with Japanese ancestry, on the islands of Hawaii the term obake has found its way into the dialect of the local people. Some Japanese stories concerning these creatures have found their way into local culture in Hawaii: numerous sightings of kappa have been reported on the islands, and the Japanese faceless ghosts called noppera-bō have also become well known in Hawaii under the name mujina. This name confusion seems to have stemmed from a story by Lafcadio Hearn titled "Mujina", a story about a badger (mujina) which takes the form of a noppera-bō, rather than being one itself, which first introduced the faceless ghost to the Western world.

Hawaiian folklorist Glen Grant was known for his Obake Files, a series of reports he developed about supernatural incidents in Hawaii. The grand bulk of these incidents and reports were of Japanese origin or concerned obake.

== In popular culture ==
Bakemono is featured in The Terror: Infamy, the second season of AMC's television series, The Terror.
