= List of feature film series with four entries =

This is a list of film series that have four entries.

Key:

- (A) – Film series is 100% animated
- (a) – Film series is not 100% animated and has live action in a sequel or prequel
- (TV) – made-for-TV
- (V) – direct-to-video
- (*) – TV series attached

== 0-9 ==
- 3 Ninjas
  1. 3 Ninjas (1992)
  2. 3 Ninjas Kick Back (1994)
  3. 3 Ninjas Knuckle Up (1995)
  4. 3 Ninjas: High Noon at Mega Mountain (1998)
- 28 Days Later
  1. 28 Days Later (2002)
  2. 28 Weeks Later (2007)
  3. 28 Years Later (2025)
  4. 28 Years Later: The Bone Temple (2026)

== A ==
- Abbott and Costello Meet the Universal Monsters
  1. Abbott and Costello Meet Frankenstein (1948)
  2. Abbott and Costello Meet the Invisible Man (1951)
  3. Abbott and Costello Meet Dr. Jekyll and Mr. Hyde (1953)
  4. Abbott and Costello Meet the Mummy (1955)
- Airport
  1. Airport (1970)
  2. Airport 1975 (1975)
  3. Airport '77 (1977)
  4. The Concorde ... Airport '79 (1979)
- Angel
  1. Angel (1984)
  2. Avenging Angel (1985)
  3. Angel III: The Final Chapter (1988) (V)
  4. Angel 4: Undercover (1993) (V)
- An American Tail (A) *
  1. An American Tail (1986)
  2. An American Tail: Fievel Goes West (1991)
  3. An American Tail: The Treasure of Manhattan Island (1998) (V)
  4. An American Tail: The Mystery of the Night Monster (2000) (V)
- Aladdin (a) *
  1. Aladdin (1992) (A)
  2. The Return of Jafar (1994) (A) (V)
  3. Aladdin and the King of Thieves (1996) (A) (V)
  4. Aladdin (2019)
- Apocalypse
  1. Apocalypse (1998) (V)
  2. Apocalypse II: Revelation (1999) (V)
  3. Apocalypse III: Tribulation (2000) (V)
  4. Apocalypse IV: Judgment (2001) (V)
- Adémaï
  1. Adémaï au Moyen Âge (1934)
  2. Adémaï aviateur (1934)
  3. Adémaï bandit d'honneur (1943)
  4. Adémaï au poteau-frontière (1950)
- Aki Kaurismäki's Proletariat series
  1. Shadows in Paradise (1986)
  2. Ariel (1988)
  3. The Match Factory Girl (1990)
  4. Fallen Leaves (2023)
- Alan O'Connor and Bobbie Reynolds
  1. Yellow Cargo (1936)
  2. Navy Spy (1937)
  3. The Gold Racket (1937)
  4. Bank Alarm (1937)
- All Grown Up! *
  1. All Growed Up (2001) (TV)
  2. All Grown Up! - Interview With a Campfire (2004) (TV)
  3. All Grown Up! - Dude, Where's My Horse? (2005) (TV)
  4. All Grown Up! - R.V. Having Fun Yet? (2006) (TV)
- Alvin and the Chipmunks
  1. Alvin and the Chipmunks (2007)
  2. Alvin and the Chipmunks: The Squeakquel (2009)
  3. Alvin and the Chipmunks: Chipwrecked (2011)
  4. Alvin and the Chipmunks: The Road Chip (2015)
- Anak ni Waray *
  1. Waray-waray (1954)
  2. Handang matodas (1956)
  3. Anak ni Waray (1958)
  4. Anak ni Waray vs Anak ni Biday (1984)
- Animation Celebration
  1. Animation Celebration (1986)
  2. The 2nd Animation Celebration: The Movie (1990)
  3. The Third Animation Celebration: The Movie (1991)
  4. The 4th Animation Celebration: The Movie (1992)
- Anne of Green Gables *
  1. Anne of Green Gables (1985) (TV)
  2. Anne of Avonlea (1987) (TV)
  3. Anne of Green Gables: The Continuing Story (2000) (TV)
  4. Anne of Green Gables: A New Beginning (2008) (TV) (prequel)
- Ator l'invincibile
  1. Ator l'invincible (1982)
  2. Ator 2 - L'invincibile Orion (1984)
  3. Iron Warrior (1987)
  4. Quest for the Mighty Sword (1990)

== B ==
- The Bad News Bears *
  1. The Bad News Bears (1976)
  2. The Bad News Bears in Breaking Training (1977)
  3. The Bad News Bears Go to Japan (1978)
  4. Bad News Bears (2005) (remake)
- Beverly Hills Cop
  1. Beverly Hills Cop (1984)
  2. Beverly Hills Cop II (1987)
  3. Beverly Hills Cop III (1994)
  4. Beverly Hills Cop: Axel F (2024)
- Black Cobra
  1. Black Cobra (1987)
  2. Black Cobra 2 (1988)
  3. Black Cobra 3: Manila Connection (1990)
  4. Black Cobra 4: Detective Malone (1990)
- Best of the Best
  1. Best of the Best (1989)
  2. Best of the Best II (1993)
  3. Best of the Best 3: No Turning Back (1995) (V)
  4. Best of the Best 4: Without Warning (1998) (V)
- Bad Boys *
  1. Bad Boys (1995)
  2. Bad Boys II (2003)
  3. Bad Boys for Life (2020)
  4. Bad Boys: Ride or Die (2024)
- Behind Enemy Lines
  1. Behind Enemy Lines (2001)
  2. Behind Enemy Lines II: Axis of Evil (2006) (V)
  3. Behind Enemy Lines: Colombia (2009) (V)
  4. SEAL Team 8: Behind Enemy Lines (2014) (V)
- Bridget Jones
  1. Bridget Jones's Diary (2001)
  2. Bridget Jones: The Edge of Reason (2004)
  3. Bridget Jones's Baby (2016)
  4. Bridget Jones: Mad About the Boy (2025)
- Barbershop
  1. Barbershop (2002)
  2. Barbershop 2: Back in Business (2004)
  3. Beauty Shop (2005) (spin-off)
  4. Barbershop: The Next Cut (2016)
- Bionicle (A) *
  1. Bionicle: Mask of Light (2003) (V)
  2. Bionicle 2: Legends of Metru Nui (2004) (V)
  3. Bionicle 3: Web of Shadows (2005) (V)
  4. Bionicle: The Legend Reborn (2009) (V)
- Big Town
  1. I Cover Big Town (1947)
  2. Big Town (1947)
  3. Big Town After Dark (1947)
  4. Big Town Scandal (1948)
- Billy Jack
  1. The Born Losers (1967)
  2. Billy Jack (1971)
  3. The Trial of Billy Jack (1974)
  4. Billy Jack Goes to Washington (1977)
- Bleach
  1. Bleach: Memories of Nobody (2006)
  2. Bleach: The DiamondDust Rebellion (2007)
  3. Bleach: Fade to Black (2008)
  4. Bleach: Hell Verse (2010)
- Blood
  1. Brides of Blood (1968)
  2. Mad Doctor of Blood Island (1968)
  3. Beast of Blood (1971)
  4. Brain of Blood (1972)
- Boa vs. Python
  1. Python (2000) (TV)
  2. New Alcatraz (2002) (TV)
  3. Pythons 2 (2002) (TV)
  4. Boa vs. Python (2004) (TV)
- The Brave Archer
  1. The Brave Archer (1977)
  2. The Brave Archer 2 (1978)
  3. The Brave Archer 3 (1981) (a.k.a. Blast of the Iron Palm)
  4. The Brave Archer and His Mate (1982) (a.k.a. Mysterious Island)
- Brenner
  1. Komm, süßer Tod (2000)
  2. Silentium (2004)
  3. The Bone Man (2009)
  4. Life Eternal (2015)
- Broadway Melody
  1. The Broadway Melody (1929)
  2. Broadway Melody of 1936 (1935)
  3. Broadway Melody of 1938 (1937)
  4. Broadway Melody of 1940 (1940)
- Baaghi
  1. Baaghi (2016)
  2. Baaghi 2 (2018)
  3. Baaghi 3 (2020)
  4. Baaghi 4 (2025)

== C ==
- Cinderella (a)
  1. Cinderella (1950) (A)
  2. Cinderella II: Dreams Come True (2002) (A) (V)
  3. Cinderella III: A Twist in Time (2007) (A) (V)
  4. Cinderella (2015)
- Carrie
  1. Carrie (1976)
  2. The Rage: Carrie 2 (1999)
  3. Carrie (2002) (TV) (remake)
  4. Carrie (2013) (remake)
- The Cutting Edge
  1. The Cutting Edge (1992)
  2. The Cutting Edge: Going for the Gold (2006) (TV)
  3. The Cutting Edge: Chasing the Dream (2008) (TV)
  4. The Cutting Edge: Fire and Ice (2010) (TV)
- Candyman
  1. Candyman (1992)
  2. Candyman: Farewell to the Flesh (1995)
  3. Candyman 3: Day of the Dead (1999) (V)
  4. Candyman (2021) (retcon)
- Cube
  1. Cube (1997)
  2. Cube 2: Hypercube (2002)
  3. Cube Zero (2004) (prequel)
  4. Cube (2021) (remake)
- Cabin Fever
  1. Cabin Fever (2002)
  2. Cabin Fever 2: Spring Fever (2009) (V)
  3. Cabin Fever: Patient Zero (2014) (V) (prequel)
  4. Cabin Fever (2016) (V) (remake)
- The Cheetah Girls
  1. The Cheetah Girls (2003) (TV)
  2. The Cheetah Girls 2 (2006) (TV)
  3. The Cheetah Girls: One World (2008) (TV)
  4. The Cheetah Girls: Next Gen (2027) (TV)
- The Chronicles of Narnia
  1. The Chronicles of Narnia: The Lion, the Witch and the Wardrobe (2005)
  2. The Chronicles of Narnia: Prince Caspian (2008)
  3. The Chronicles of Narnia: The Voyage of the Dawn Treader (2010)
  4. Narnia: The Magician's Nephew (2027) (reboot)
- Captain Tsubasa ****
  1. Captain Tsubasa: Europe Daikessen (1985)
  2. Captain Tsubasa: Ayaushi, Zen Nippon Jr. (1985)
  3. Captain Tsubasa: Sekai Daikessen!! Jr. World Cup (1986)
  4. Captain Tsubasa: Holland Youth (1994) (V)
- CBI
  1. Oru CBI Diary Kurippu (1988)
  2. Jagratha (1989)
  3. Sethurama Iyer CBI (2004)
  4. Nerariyan CBI (2005)
- ChalkZone *
  1. ChalkZone - Double Trouble (2004) (TV)
  2. ChalkZone - The Big Blow Up (2004) (TV)
  3. ChalkZone - When Santas Collide (2004) (TV)
  4. ChalkZone - The Art of Sucker Punch (2009) (TV)
- The Cheerleaders
  1. The Cheerleaders (1973)
  2. The Swinging Cheerleaders (1974)
  3. Revenge of the Cheerleaders (1976)
  4. Cheerleaders' Wild Weekend (1979) (a. k. a. The Great American Girl Robbery)
- CID 999
  1. Jedara Bale (1968)
  2. Goa Dalli CID 999 (1968)
  3. Operation Jackpot Nalli C.I.D 999 (1969)
  4. Operation Diamond Racket (1978)
- Circleen *
  1. Circleen: City Mouse (1998)
  2. Circleen: Mice and Romance (2000)
  3. Circleen: Little Big Mouse (2008)
  4. Circleen, Coco and the Wild Rhinoceros (2018)
- CKY
  1. CKY (1999) (V) (a.k.a. Landspeed presents: CKY)
  2. CKY2K (2000) (V)
  3. CKY 3 (2001) (V)
  4. CKY4: The Latest & Greatest (2002) (V)
- Class Of Nuke 'Em High
  1. Class of Nuke 'Em High (1986)
  2. Class of Nuke 'Em High Part 2: Subhumanoid Meltdown (1991)
  3. The Good, the Bad and the Subhumanoid: Class of Nuke 'Em High Part 3 (1994)
  4. Return to Nuke 'Em High Volume 1 (2013)
- Colonnello Rambaldo Buttiglione
  1. Un ufficiale non si arrende mai nemmeno di fronte all'evidenza, firmato Colonnello Buttiglione (1973)
  2. Il colonnello Buttiglione diventa generale (1974)
  3. Buttiglione diventa capo del servizio segreto (1975)
  4. Von Buttiglione Sturmtruppenführer (1977)
- Confessions
  1. Confessions of a Window Cleaner (1974)
  2. Confessions of a Pop Performer (1975)
  3. Confessions of a Driving Instructor (1976)
  4. Confessions from a Holiday Camp (1977)
- Contes des quatre saisons
  1. Conte de printemps (1990)
  2. Conte d'hiver (1992)
  3. Conte d'été (1996)
  4. Conte d'automne (1998)
- Cool School
  1. Cool School (2007)
  2. Cool School Camp (2009)
  3. Çılgın Dersane 3 (2014)
  4. Çılgın Dersane 4: Ada (2015)
- Cop *
  1. Singham (2011)
  2. Singham Returns (2015)
  3. Simmba (2018)
  4. Sooryavanshi (2020)
- Cowgirls n' Angels
  1. Cowgirls n' Angels (2012)
  2. Cowgirls n' Angels: Dakota's Summer (2014)
  3. A Cowgirl's Story (2017)
  4. A Cowgirl's Song (2022)
- A Cry in the Wild/White Wolves
  1. A Cry in the Wild (1990)
  2. White Wolves: A Cry in the Wild II (1993)
  3. White Wolves II: Legend of the Wild (1995)
  4. White Wolves III: Cry of the White Wolf (2000)

== D ==
- The Dirty Dozen
1. The Dirty Dozen (1967)
2. The Dirty Dozen: Next Mission (1985) (TV)
3. The Dirty Dozen: The Deadly Mission (1987) (TV)
4. The Dirty Dozen: The Fatal Mission (1988) (TV)
- Dexter Riley
  1. The Computer Wore Tennis Shoes (1969)
  2. Now You See Him, Now You Don't (1972)
  3. The Strongest Man in the World (1975)
  4. The Computer Wore Tennis Shoes (1995) (TV) (remake)
- Doctor Strange (a)
  1. Dr. Strange (1978) (TV)
  2. Doctor Strange: The Sorcerer Supreme (2007) (A) (V)
  3. Doctor Strange (2016)
  4. Doctor Strange in the Multiverse of Madness (2022)
- Dune
1. Dune (1984)
2. Dune (2021) (reboot)
3. Dune: Part Two (2024) (reboot)
4. Dune: Part Three (2026) (reboot)
- Dungeons & Dragons
  1. Dungeons & Dragons (2000)
  2. Dungeons & Dragons: Wrath of the Dragon God (2005)
  3. Dungeons & Dragons: The Book of Vile Darkness (2012)
  4. Dungeons & Dragons: Honor Among Thieves (2023) (reboot)
- Dinocroc
  1. Dinocroc (2004) (V)
  2. Supergator (2007) (V)
  3. Dinoshark (2010) (TV) (spin-off)
  4. Dinocroc vs. Supergator (2010) (TV)
- Dhamaal
  1. Dhamaal (2007)
  2. Double Dhamaal (2011)
  3. Total Dhamaal (2019)
  4. Dhamaal 4 (2026)
- DC Universe ***
1. Superman (2025) (reboot)
2. Supergirl (2026) (spin-off)
3. Clayface (2026) (spin-off)
4. Man of Tomorrow (2027) (reboot)
- Dad and Dave (1932 series)
1. On Our Selection (1932)
2. Grandad Rudd (1935)
3. Dad and Dave Come to Town (1938)
4. Dad Rudd, M.P. (1940)
- Danny Phantom
1. Danny Phantom: Reign Storm (2005) (TV)
2. Danny Phantom: The Ultimate Enemy (2005) (TV)
3. Danny Phantom: Reality Trip (2006) (TV)
4. Danny Phantom: Phantom Planet (2007) (TV)
- The Dark Wind
1. The Dark Wind (1991)
2. Skinwalkers (2002) (TV)
3. Coyote Waits (2003) (TV)
4. A Thief of Time (2004) (TV)
- Death Note
1. Death Note (2006)
2. Death Note: The Last Name (2007)
3. L: Change the World (2008)
4. Death Note: Light Up the New World (2016)
- Demons
1. Dèmoni (1985) (a.k.a. Demons)
2. Dèmoni 2 (1986) (a.k.a. Demons 2)
3. Dèmoni 3 (1991) (a.k.a. Demons 3, Black Demons, The Church)
4. Cemetery Man (1994) (a.k.a. Dellamorte Dellamore, Demons '95) (unofficial)
- Department Q
1. The Keeper of Lost Causes (2013)
2. The Absent One (2014)
3. A Conspiracy of Faith (2016)
4. The Purity of Vengeance (2018)
- Dick Tracy (serials)
1. Dick Tracy (1937)
2. Dick Tracy Returns (1938)
3. Dick Tracy's G-Men (1939)
4. Dick Tracy vs. Crime, Inc. (1941)
- The Doberman Gang
1. The Doberman Gang (1972)
2. The Daring Dobermans (1973)
3. The Amazing Dobermans (1976)
4. Alex and the Doberman Gang (1980) (TV)
- Dolai
1. Dolai (1985)
2. Dolai 2 (1986)
3. Dolai 3 (1987)
4. Dolai 4: Dune Buggy (1988)
- The Donald Stachey Mysteries
1. Third Man Out (2005) (TV)
2. Shock to the System (2006) (TV)
3. On the Other Hand, Death (2008) (TV)
4. Ice Blues (2009) (TV)
- Dr. Slump **
1. Dr. Slump: "Hoyoyo!" Space Adventure (1982)
2. Dr. Slump and Arale-chan: Hoyoyo! The Great Race Around the World (1983)
3. Dr. Slump and Arale-chan: Hoyoyo! The Secret of Nanaba Castle (1984)
4. Doctor Slump: Arale's Surprise Burn (1999)
- DuckTales **
1. DuckTales: The Treasure of the Golden Suns (1987) (TV)
2. DuckTales: Time Is Money (1988) (TV)
3. Super DuckTales (1989) (TV)
4. DuckTales the Movie: Treasure of the Lost Lamp (1990)
- Ducoboo
1. Ducoboo (2011)
2. Ducoboo 2: Crazy Vacation (2012)
3. Ducoboo 3.0 (2020)
4. Ducoboo 4: Ducobu Président ! (2022)

== E ==
- The Expendables
  1. The Expendables (2010)
  2. The Expendables 2 (2012)
  3. The Expendables 3 (2014)
  4. Expend4bles (2023)
- Extraction *
  1. Extraction (2020)
  2. Extraction 2 (2023)
  3. Extraction 3 (TBA)
  4. Tygo (TBA) (spin-off)
- Einfach Rosa
  1. Die Hochzeitsplanerin (2015) (TV)
  2. Wolken über Kapstadt (2015) (TV)
  3. Verliebt, verlobt, verboten (2015) (TV)
  4. Die zweite Chance (2016) (TV)
- Enteng Kabisote: Okay ka, Fairy Ko *
  1. The Legend (2004)
  2. The Legend Continues (2005)
  3. The Legend Goes On and On and On (2006)
  4. The Beginning of the Legend (2007)

== F ==
- The Flash
  1. The Flash (1990) (TV)
  2. The Flash II: Revenge of the Trickster (1991) (V)
  3. The Flash III: Deadly Nightshade (1991) (V)
  4. The Flash (2023)
- Free Willy *
  1. Free Willy (1993)
  2. Free Willy 2: The Adventure Home (1995)
  3. Free Willy 3: The Rescue (1997)
  4. Free Willy: Escape from Pirate's Cove (2010) (V) (reboot)
- Fear Street
  1. Fear Street Part One: 1994 (2021)
  2. Fear Street Part Two: 1978 (2021)
  3. Fear Street Part Three: 1666 (2021)
  4. Fear Street: Prom Queen (2025) (prequel)
- Female Convict Scorpion
  1. Female Convict 701: Scorpion (1972)
  2. Female Convict Scorpion: Jailhouse 41 (1972)
  3. Female Prisoner Scorpion: Beast Stable (1973)
  4. Female Convict Scorpion: Grudge Song (1973)
- Fibber McGee and Molly *
  1. Look Who's Laughing (1941)
  2. Here We Go Again (1942)
  3. Heavenly Days (1944)
  4. Comin' Round the Mountain (1940) (spin-off)
- Fist of Fury
  1. Fist of Fury (1972)
  2. New Fist of Fury (1976)
  3. Fist of Fury II (1976)
  4. Fist of Fury III (1980)
- Franklin the Turtle (A) *
  1. Franklin and the Green Knight (2000)
  2. Franklin's Magic Christmas (2001)
  3. Back to School with Franklin (2003)
  4. Franklin and the Turtle Lake Treasure (2006)
- Four Daughters
  1. Four Daughters (1938)
  2. Daughters Courageous (1939)
  3. Four Wives (1940)
  4. Four Mothers (1941)
- Futurama * (A)
  1. Futurama: Bender's Big Score (2008) (V)
  2. Futurama: The Beast with a Billion Backs (2008) (V)
  3. 'Futurama: Bender's Game (2008) (V)
  4. Futurama: Into the Wild Green Yonder (2009) (V)

== G ==
- Gone in 60 Seconds
  1. Gone in 60 Seconds (1974)
  2. The Junkman (1982) (spin-off)
  3. Deadline Auto Theft (1983) (spin-off)
  4. Gone in 60 Seconds (2000) (remake)
- Ghoulies
  1. Ghoulies (1985)
  2. Ghoulies II (1987) (V)
  3. Ghoulies III: Ghoulies Go to College (1991) (V)
  4. Ghoulies IV (1994) (V)
- Green Lantern (a)
  1. Green Lantern: First Flight (2009) (A) (V)
  2. Green Lantern: Emerald Knights (2011) (A) (V)
  3. Green Lantern (2011)
  4. Green Lantern: Beware My Power (2022) (A) (V)
- Gakko no Kaidan
  1. Gakko no Kaidan (1995)
  2. Gakkō no Kaidan 2 (1996)
  3. Gakko no Kaidan 3 (1997)
  4. Gakko no Kaidan 4 (1999)
- Gangster
  1. Satya (1998)
  2. Company (2002)
  3. D (2005)
  4. Satya 2 (2013)
- Gold Diggers
  1. Gold Diggers of 1933 (1933)
  2. Gold Diggers of 1935 (1935)
  3. Gold Diggers of 1937 (1936)
  4. Gold Diggers in Paris (1938)
- Golmaal
  1. Golmaal (2006)
  2. Golmaal Returns (2008)
  3. Golmaal 3 (2010)
  4. Golmaal Again (2017)
- La gran familia
  1. La gran familia (1962)
  2. La familia y... uno más (1965)
  3. La familia, bien, gracias (1979)
  4. La familia... 30 años después (1999) (TV)
- The Great Gildersleeve *
  1. The Great Gildersleeve (1942)
  2. Gildersleeve's Bad Day (1943)
  3. Gildersleeve on Broadway (1943)
  4. Gildersleeve's Ghost (1944)
- Gourmet Detective
  1. The Gourmet Detective (2015) (TV)
  2. The Gourmet Detective: A Healthy Place to Die (2015) (TV)
  3. Death Al Dente: A Gourmet Detective Mystery (2016) (TV)
  4. Eat, Drink & Be Buried: A Gourmet Detective Mystery (2017) (TV)

== H ==
- The Hills Have Eyes
  1. The Hills Have Eyes (1977)
  2. The Hills Have Eyes Part II (1985) (V)
  3. The Hills Have Eyes (2006) (remake)
  4. The Hills Have Eyes 2 (2007) (remake)
- House
  1. House (1985)
  2. House II: The Second Story (1987)
  3. House III (1989)
  4. House IV (1992)
- Halloweentown
  1. Halloweentown (1998) (TV)
  2. Halloweentown II: Kalabar's Revenge (2001) (TV)
  3. Halloweentown High (2004) (TV)
  4. Return to Halloweentown (2006) (TV)
- Honey
  1. Honey (2003)
  2. Honey 2 (2011)
  3. Honey 3: Dare to Dance (2016) (V)
  4. Honey: Rise Up and Dance (2018) (V)
- Hatchet
  1. Hatchet (2006) (V)
  2. Hatchet II (2010) (V)
  3. Hatchet III (2013) (V)
  4. Victor Crowley (2017) (V)
- High School Musical
  1. High School Musical (2006) (TV)
  2. High School Musical 2 (2007) (TV)
  3. High School Musical 3: Senior Year (2008)
  4. Sharpay's Fabulous Adventure (2011) (TV) (spin-off)
- Hotel Transylvania (A) *
  1. Hotel Transylvania (2012)
  2. Hotel Transylvania 2 (2015)
  3. Hotel Transylvania 3: Summer Vacation (2018)
  4. Hotel Transylvania: Transformania (2022)
- Hate Story
  1. Hate Story (2012)
  2. Hate Story 2 (2014)
  3. Hate Story 3 (2015)
  4. Hate Story 4 (2018)
- Hanni & Nanni
  1. Hanni & Nanni (2010)
  2. Hanni & Nanni 2 (2012)
  3. Hanni & Nanni 3 (2013)
  4. Hanni & Nanni 4 (2017)
- Hell Comes to Frogtown
  1. Hell Comes to Frogtown (1987)
  2. Return to Frogtown (1993)
  3. Toad Warrior (1996)
  4. Max Hell Frog Warrior (2002)
- Hot Wheels AcceleRacers
  1. Hot Wheels: AcceleRacers – Ignition (2005) (TV)
  2. Hot Wheels: AcceleRacers – The Speed of Silence (2005) (TV)
  3. Hot Wheels: AcceleRacers – Breaking Point (2005) (TV)
  4. Hot Wheels: AcceleRacers – The Ultimate Race (2005) (TV)
- Hunter *
  1. Hunter (1984) (TV)
  2. The Return of Hunter: Everyone Walks in L.A. (1995) (TV)
  3. Hunter: Return to Justice (2002) (TV)
  4. Hunter: Back in Force (2003) (TV)

== I ==
- Iron Eagle
  1. Iron Eagle (1986)
  2. Iron Eagle II (1988)
  3. Aces: Iron Eagle III (1992)
  4. Iron Eagle on the Attack (1995) (V)
- I Know What You Did Last Summer *
  1. I Know What You Did Last Summer (1997)
  2. I Still Know What You Did Last Summer (1998)
  3. I'll Always Know What You Did Last Summer (2006) (V)
  4. I Know What You Did Last Summer (2025) (retcon)
- iCarly *
  1. iCarly: iGo to Japan (2008) (TV)
  2. iCarly: iDate a Bad Boy (2009) (TV)
  3. iCarly: iFight Shelby Marx (2009) (TV)
  4. iCarly: iQuit iCarly (2009) (TV)
- Ilsa: She-Wolf of the SS
  1. Ilsa, She Wolf of the SS (1975)
  2. Ilsa, Harem Keeper of the Oil Sheiks (1976)
  3. Ilsa, the Wicked Warden (1977)
  4. Ilsa, the Tigress of Siberia (1977)
- Imperium
  1. Imperium: Augustus (2003)
  2. Imperium: Nero (2004)
  3. Imperium: Saint Peter (2005)
  4. Imperium: Pompeii (2006)
- Ingmarssönerna
  1. Ingmarssönerna (1919)
  2. Karin Ingmarsdotter (1920)
  3. Ingmarsarvet (1925)
  4. Till österland (1926)
- Inspector Grey
  1. Inspecteur Grey (1936)
  2. L'Empreinte rouge (1937)
  3. La Treizième enquête de Grey (1937)
  4. Grey contre X (1940)
- The Inspector Wears Skirts
  1. The Inspector Wears Skirts (1988)
  2. The Inspector Wears Skirts II (1989)
  3. The Inspector Wears Skirts III (1990)
  4. The Inspector Wears Skirts IV (1992)
- Inuyasha *
  1. Affections Touching Across Time (2001)
  2. The Castle Beyond the Looking Glass (2002)
  3. Swords of an Honorable Ruler (2003)
  4. Fire on the Mystic Island (2004)
- Ironside *
  1. Ironside (1967) (TV) (Pilot of the TV series)
  2. Split Second to an Epitaph (1968) (TV)
  3. The Priest Killer (1971) (TV)
  4. The Return of Ironside (1993) (TV)
- It's a Mad, Mad, Mad World
  1. It's a Mad, Mad, Mad World (1987)
  2. It's a Mad, Mad, Mad World 2 (1988)
  3. It's a Mad, Mad, Mad World 3 (1989)
  4. It's a Mad, Mad, Mad World 4 (1992)

== J ==
- Jaws
  1. Jaws (1975)
  2. Jaws 2 (1978)
  3. Jaws 3-D (1983)
  4. Jaws: The Revenge (1987) (retcon)
- Jeepers Creepers
  1. Jeepers Creepers (2001)
  2. Jeepers Creepers 2 (2003)
  3. Jeepers Creepers 3 (2017) (V)
  4. Jeepers Creepers: Reborn (2022) (V) (reboot)
- Jarhead
  1. Jarhead (2005)
  2. Jarhead 2: Field of Fire (2014) (V)
  3. Jarhead 3: The Siege (2016) (V)
  4. Jarhead: Law of Return (2019) (V)
- Janne Vängman
  1. Janne Vängmans bravader (1948)
  2. Janne Vängman på nya äventyr (1949)
  3. Janne Vängman i farten (1952)
  4. Janne Vängman och den stora kometen (1955)
- The Jetsons *
  1. The Jetsons Meet the Flintstones (1987) (TV)
  2. Rockin' with Judy Jetson (1988) (TV)
  3. Jetsons: The Movie (1990)
  4. The Jetsons & WWE: Robo-WrestleMania! (2017) (V)
- Journey to the Unknown *
  1. Journey Into Darkness (1968) (TV)
  2. Journey to Midnight (1968) (TV)
  3. Journey to the Unknown (1969) (TV)
  4. Journey to Murder (1971) (TV)

== K ==
- K-9
  1. K-9 (1989)
  2. K-9000 (1991) (TV) (spin-off)
  3. K-911 (1999) (V)
  4. K-9: P.I. (2002) (V)
- Kung Fu Panda (A) ***
  1. Kung Fu Panda (2008)
  2. Kung Fu Panda 2 (2011)
  3. Kung Fu Panda 3 (2016)
  4. Kung Fu Panda 4 (2024)
- Kingsman
  1. Kingsman: The Secret Service (2014)
  2. Kingsman: The Golden Circle (2017)
  3. The King's Man (2021) (prequel)
  4. Argylle (2024) (spin-off)
- Killer Tomatoes! *
  1. Attack of the Killer Tomatoes (1978)
  2. Return of the Killer Tomatoes (1988)
  3. Killer Tomatoes Strike Back (1990) (V)
  4. Killer Tomatoes Eat France (1991) (V)
- Kolchak: The Night Stalker **
  1. The Night Stalker (1972) (TV)
  2. The Night Strangler (1972) (TV)
  3. Crackle of Death (1976) (TV)
  4. The Demon and the Mummy (1976) (TV)
- Komisario Palmu
  1. Komisario Palmun erehdys (1960)
  2. Kaasua, komisario Palmu! (1961)
  3. Tähdet kertovat, komisario Palmu (1962)
  4. Vodkaa, komisario Palmu (1969)
- Krummerne *
  1. Krummerne (1991)
  2. Krummerne 2 - Stakkels Krumme (1992)
  3. Krummerne 3 - Fars gode idé (1994)
  4. Krummerne - Så er det jul igen (2006)

== L ==
- Lethal Weapon *
  1. Lethal Weapon (1987)
  2. Lethal Weapon 2 (1989)
  3. Lethal Weapon 3 (1992)
  4. Lethal Weapon 4 (1998)
- The Lego Movie
  1. The Lego Movie (2014)
  2. The Lego Batman Movie (2017) (spin-off)
  3. The Lego Ninjago Movie (2017) (spin-off)
  4. The Lego Movie 2: The Second Part (2019)
- La liceale
  1. La liceale (1975)
  2. La liceale nella classe dei ripetenti (1978)
  3. La liceale seduce i professori (1979)
  4. La liceale, il diavolo e l'acquasanta (1979)
- La poliziotta
  1. La poliziotta (1974)
  2. La poliziotta fa carriera (1975)
  3. La poliziotta della squadra del buon costume (1979)
  4. La poliziotta a New York (1981)
- Lapland Odyssey
  1. Lapland Odyssey (2010)
  2. Lapland Odyssey 2 (2015)
  3. Lapland Odyssey 3 (2017)
  4. Lapland Odyssey 4 (2022)
- Le Tre Rose di Eva
  1. Le Tre Rose di Eva (2012)
  2. Le Tre Rose di Eva 2 (2013)
  3. Le Tre Rose di Eva 3 (2015)
  4. Le Tre Rose di Eva 4 (2017)
- Levy and Company
  1. Levy and Company (1930)
  2. The Levy Department Stores (1932)
  3. Moïse et Salomon parfumeurs (1935)
  4. Les Mariages de Mademoiselle Lévy (1936)
- Lieutenant 'Brass' Bancroft
  1. Secret Service of the Air (1939)
  2. Code of the Secret Service (1939)
  3. Smashing the Money Ring (1939)
  4. Murder in the Air (1940)
- Lilla Jönssonligan
  1. Lilla Jönssonligan och cornflakeskuppen (1996)
  2. Lilla Jönssonligan på styva linan (1997)
  3. Lilla Jönssonligan på kollo (2004)
  4. Lilla Jönssonligan och stjärnkuppen (2006)
- Lille Fridolf
  1. Lille Fridolf och jag (1956)
  2. Lille Fridolf blir morfar (1957)
  3. Fridolf sticker opp! (1958)
  4. Fridolfs farliga ålder (1959)
- Lilo & Stitch *** (A)
  1. Lilo & Stitch (2002)
  2. Stitch! The Movie (2003) (V)
  3. Lilo & Stitch 2: Stitch Has a Glitch (2005) (V)
  4. Leroy & Stitch (2006) (TV)
- Loafing and Camouflage
  1. Loafing and Camouflage (1984)
  2. BIOS kai Politeia (1987)
  3. Loafing and Camouflage: Sirens in the Aegean (2005)
  4. Loafing and Camouflage: I4 (2008)
- Lucky Luke * (A)
  1. Daisy Town (1971)
  2. The Ballad of the Daltons (1978)
  3. The Daltons on the Loose (1983)
  4. Go West: A Lucky Luke Adventure (2007)
- Lux, König der Abenteurer
  1. Lux, King of Criminals (1929)
  2. The Man in the Dark (1930)
  3. Pariser Unterwelt (1930)
  4. Zweimal Lux (1930)

== M ==
- Meatballs
  1. Meatballs (1979)
  2. Meatballs Part II (1984)
  3. Meatballs III: Summer Job (1986)
  4. Meatballs 4 (1992)
- Mario (a) *******
  1. Super Mario Bros.: The Great Mission to Rescue Princess Peach! (1986) (A)
  2. Super Mario Bros. (1993)
  3. The Super Mario Bros. Movie (2023) (A)
  4. The Super Mario Galaxy Movie (2026) (A)
- Mirror, Mirror
  1. Mirror, Mirror (1990)
  2. Mirror, Mirror II: Raven Dance (1994) (V)
  3. Mirror, Mirror III: The Voyeur (1995) (V)
  4. Mirror, Mirror IV: Reflection (2000) (V)
- Men in Black *
  1. Men in Black (1997)
  2. Men in Black II (2002)
  3. Men in Black 3 (2012)
  4. Men in Black: International (2019)
- The Matrix
  1. The Matrix (1999)
  2. The Matrix Reloaded (2003)
  3. The Matrix Revolutions (2003)
  4. The Matrix Resurrections (2021)
- Madagascar (A) ***
  1. Madagascar (2005)
  2. Madagascar: Escape 2 Africa (2008)
  3. Madagascar 3: Europe's Most Wanted (2012)
  4. Penguins of Madagascar (2014) (spin-off)
- Major Mahadevan
  1. Keerthi Chakra (2006)
  2. Kurukshetra (2008)
  3. Kandahar (2010)
  4. 1971: Beyond Borders (2017)
- Martha's Vineyard Mysteries
  1. A Beautiful Place to Die: A Martha's Vineyard Mystery (2020) (TV)
  2. Riddled with Deceit: A Martha's Vineyard Mystery (2020) (TV)
  3. Ships in the Night: A Martha's Vineyard Mystery (2021) (TV)
  4. Poisoned in Paradise: A Martha's Vineyard Mystery (221) (TV)
- Matt Helm
  1. The Silencers (1966)
  2. Murderers' Row (1966)
  3. The Ambushers (1967)
  4. The Wrecking Crew (1969)
- McDull
  1. My Life as McDull (2001)
  2. McDull, Prince de la Bun (2004)
  3. McDull, the Alumni (2006)
  4. McDull, Kung Fu Kindergarten (2009)
- Midnight Run
  1. Midnight Run (1988)
  2. Another Midnight Run (1994) (TV)
  3. Midnight Runaround (1994) (TV)
  4. Midnight Run for Your Life (1994) (TV)
- Mike Hammer (Theatrical films)
  1. I, the Jury (1953)
  2. Kiss Me Deadly (1955)
  3. My Gun Is Quick (1957)
  4. The Girl Hunters (1963)
- Min søsters børn
  1. Min søsters børn (1966)
  2. Min søsters børn på bryllupsrejse (1967)
  3. Magic in Town (1968)
  4. Kid Gang on the Go (1971)
- Miss Marple, portrayed by Margaret Rutherford
  1. Murder, She Said (1961)
  2. Murder at the Gallop (1963)
  3. Murder Most Foul (1964)
  4. Murder Ahoy! (1964)
- Monsieur Hulot
  1. Les vacances de Monsieur Hulot (1953)
  2. Mon oncle (1958)
  3. Play Time (1967)
  4. Trafic (1971)
- Morecambe and Wise ******
  1. The Intelligence Men (1965)
  2. That Riviera Touch (1966)
  3. The Magnificent Two (1967)
  4. Night Train to Murder (1984) (TV)
- Mr. Magoo ****
  1. 1001 Arabian Nights (1959)
  2. Mr. Magoo's Christmas Carol (1962) (TV)
  3. Uncle Sam Magoo (1970) (TV)
  4. Kung-Fu Magoo (2010)
- Multiple-Headed Shark Attack
  1. 2-Headed Shark Attack (2012) (V)
  2. 3-Headed Shark Attack (2015) (V)
  3. 5-Headed Shark Attack (2017) (TV)
  4. 6-Headed Shark Attack (2018) (TV)
- Muni series
  1. Muni (2007)
  2. Muni 2: Kanchana (2011)
  3. Kanchana 2 (2015)
  4. Kanchana 3 (2019)
- Murder 101
  1. Murder 101 (2006) (TV)
  2. Murder 101: College Can Be Murder (2007) (TV)
  3. Murder 101: If Wishes Were Horses (2007) (TV)
  4. Murder 101: Locked Room Mystery (2008) (TV) (a.k.a. Murder 101: New Age)
- My Little Pony: Equestria Girls
  1. My Little Pony: Equestria Girls (2013)
  2. My Little Pony: Equestria Girls – Rainbow Rocks (2014)
  3. My Little Pony: Equestria Girls – Friendship Games (2015)
  4. My Little Pony: Equestria Girls – Legend of Everfree (2016)

== N ==
- The Nutty Professor (a)
  1. The Nutty Professor (1963)
  2. The Nutty Professor (1996) (remake)
  3. Nutty Professor II: The Klumps (2000) (remake)
  4. The Nutty Professor 2: Facing the Fear (2008) (A) (V)
- Night of the Demons
  1. Night of the Demons (1988)
  2. Night of the Demons 2 (1994) (V)
  3. Night of the Demons III (1997) (V)
  4. Night of the Demons (2009) (V) (remake)
- The Naked Gun *
  1. The Naked Gun: From the Files of Police Squad! (1988)
  2. The Naked Gun 2½: The Smell of Fear (1991)
  3. Naked Gun 33 1/3: The Final Insult (1994)
  4. The Naked Gun (2025)
- Night at the Museum
  1. Night at the Museum (2006)
  2. Night at the Museum: Battle of the Smithsonian (2009)
  3. Night at the Museum: Secret of the Tomb (2014)
  4. Night at the Museum: Kahmunrah Rises Again (2022)
- Never Back Down
  1. Never Back Down (2008)
  2. Never Back Down 2: The Beatdown (2011) (V)
  3. Never Back Down: No Surrender (2016) (V)
  4. Never Back Down: Revolt (2021) (V)
- Nancy Drew
  1. Nancy Drew... Detective (1938)
  2. Nancy Drew... Reporter (1939)
  3. Nancy Drew... Trouble Shooter (1939)
  4. Nancy Drew and the Hidden Staircase (1939)
- Nativity
  1. Nativity! (2009)
  2. Danger in the Manger (2012)
  3. Dude, Where's My Donkey? (2014)
  4. Nativity Rocks! (2018)
- Nemuri Kyoshirō (Masakazu Tamura series)
  1. Nemuri Kyôshirô (1989)
  2. Nemuri Kyôshirô 2: Conspiracy in Edo Castle (1993)
  3. Nemuri Kyôshirô 3: The Man of No Tomorrow (1996)
  4. Nemuri Kyôshirô 4: The Woman Who Loved Kyoshiro (1998)

== O ==
- Open Season (A)
  1. Open Season (2006)
  2. Open Season 2 (2008) (V)
  3. Open Season 3 (2010) (V)
  4. Open Season: Scared Silly (2015) (V)
- Operatsiya Y i drugiye priklyucheniya Shurika
  1. Sovershenno seryozno (1961)
  2. Operatsiya Y i drugiye priklyucheniya Shurika (1965)
  3. Kavkazskaya plennitsa, ili Novye priklyucheniya Shurika (1967)
  4. Ivan Vasilevich menyaet professiyu (1973)

== P ==
- Poltergeist *
  1. Poltergeist (1982)
  2. Poltergeist II: The Other Side (1986)
  3. Poltergeist III (1988)
  4. Poltergeist (2015) (remake)
- Pumpkinhead
  1. Pumpkinhead (1988)
  2. Pumpkinhead II: Blood Wings (1994) (V)
  3. Pumpkinhead: Ashes to Ashes (2006) (TV)
  4. Pumpkinhead: Blood Feud (2007) (TV)
- Project Shadowchaser
  1. Project Shadowchaser (1992) (V)
  2. Project Shadowchaser II (1994) (V)
  3. Project Shadowchaser III (1995) (V)
  4. Project Shadowchaser IV (1996) (V)
- Poison Ivy
  1. Poison Ivy (1992)
  2. Poison Ivy II: Lily (1996) (V)
  3. Poison Ivy: The New Seduction (1997) (V)
  4. Poison Ivy: The Secret Society (2008) (TV)
- Power Rangers **
  1. Mighty Morphin Power Rangers: The Movie (1995)
  2. Turbo: A Power Rangers Movie (1997)
  3. Power Rangers (2017) (reboot)
  4. Mighty Morphin Power Rangers: Once & Always (2023) (TV)
- Paranormal Entity
  1. Paranormal Entity (2009)
  2. 8213: Gacy House (2010)
  3. Anneliese: The Exorcist Tapes (2011)
  4. 100 Ghost Street: The Return of Richard Speck (2012)
- Paul Temple
  1. Send for Paul Temple (1946)
  2. Calling Paul Temple (1948)
  3. Paul Temple's Triumph (1950)
  4. Paul Temple Returns (1952)
- Peyton Place **
  1. Peyton Place (1957)
  2. Return to Peyton Place (1961)
  3. Murder in Peyton Place (1977) (TV)
  4. Peyton Place: The Next Generation (1985) (TV)
- Piedone
  1. Piedone lo sbirro (1973)
  2. Piedone a Hong Kong (1975)
  3. Piedone l'africano (1978)
  4. Piedone d'Egitto (1980)
- Piet Piraat *
  1. Piet Piraat en de betoverde kroon (2005)
  2. Piet Piraat en het vliegende schip (2006)
  3. Piet Piraat en het zwaard van Zilvertand (2008)
  4. Piet Piraat en het zeemonster (2013)
- Pippi Longstocking **
  1. Pippi Longstocking (1969)
  2. Pippi Goes on Board (1969)
  3. Pippi on the Run (1970)
  4. Pippi in the South Seas (1970)
- Pom Pom
  1. Pom Pom (1984)
  2. The Return of Pom Pom (1984)
  3. Mr. Boo Meets Pom Pom (1985)
  4. Pom Pom Strikes Back (1986)
- Pontianak
  1. Pontianak (1957)
  2. Dendam Pontianak (1957)
  3. Sumpah Pontianak (1958)
  4. Pontianak Kembali (1963)
- The Prince & Me
  1. The Prince & Me (2004)
  2. The Prince & Me 2: The Royal Wedding (2006) (V)
  3. The Prince & Me: A Royal Honeymoon (2008) (V)
  4. The Prince & Me: The Elephant Adventure (2010) (V)
- P.R.O.B.E.
  1. P.R.O.B.E.: The Zero Imperative (1994) (V)
  2. P.R.O.B.E.: The Devil of Winterborne (1995) (V)
  3. P.R.O.B.E.: Unnatural Selection (1996) (V)
  4. P.R.O.B.E.: Ghosts of Winterborne (1996) (V)

== Q ==
- A Quiet Place
  1. A Quiet Place (2018)
  2. A Quiet Place Part II (2021)
  3. A Quiet Place: Day One (2024) (spin-off)
  4. A Quiet Place Part III (2027)

== R ==
- Revenge of the Nerds
1. Revenge of the Nerds (1984)
2. Revenge of the Nerds II: Nerds in Paradise (1987)
3. Revenge of the Nerds III: The Next Generation (1992) (TV)
4. Revenge of the Nerds IV: Nerds in Love (1994) (TV)
- RoboCop ****
  1. RoboCop (1987)
  2. RoboCop 2 (1990)
  3. RoboCop 3 (1993)
  4. RoboCop (2014) (remake)
- Road House
1. Road House (1989)
2. Road House 2 (2006) (V)
3. Road House (2024) (remake)
4. Road House 2 (TBA) (remake)
- Relentless
1. Relentless (1989)
2. Dead On: Relentless II (1992) (V)
3. Relentless 3 (1993) (V)
4. Relentless IV: Ashes to Ashes (1994) (V)
- Raaz
1. Raaz (2002)
2. Raaz: The Mystery Continues (2009)
3. Raaz 3: The Third Dimension (2012)
4. Raaz: Reboot (2016)
- Rebuild of Evangelion
1. Evangelion: 1.0 You Are (Not) Alone (2007)
2. Evangelion: 2.0 You Can (Not) Advance (2009)
3. Evangelion: 3.0 You Can (Not) Redo (2012)
4. Evangelion: 3.0 + 1.0: Thrice Upon A Time (2021)
- Recess *
1. Recess: School's Out (2001)
2. Recess Christmas: Miracle on Third Street (2001) (V)
3. Recess: Taking the Fifth Grade (2003) (V)
4. Recess: All Growed Down (2004) (V)
- Robotech *
1. Codename: Robotech (1985)
2. Robotech: The Movie (1986) (a.k.a. Robotech: The Untold Story)
3. Robotech II: The Sentinels (1987)
4. Robotech: The Shadow Chronicles (2006)
- Rocket Power *
1. Rocket Power: Race Across New Zealand (2002) (TV)
2. Rocket Power: Reggie's Big (Beach) Break (2003) (TV)
3. Rocket Power: Island of the Menehune (2004) (TV)
4. Rocket Power: The Big Day (2004) (TV)
- Roxy Hunter
1. Roxy Hunter and the Mystery of the Moody Ghost (2007) (TV)
2. Roxy Hunter and the Myth of the Mermaid (2008) (TV)
3. Roxy Hunter and the Secret of the Shaman (2008) (TV)
4. Roxy Hunter and the Horrific Halloween (2008) (TV)
- Rudolph the Red-Nosed Reindeer (Rankin/Bass series)
1. Rudolph the Red-Nosed Reindeer (1964) (TV)
2. Rudolph's Shiny New Year (1976) (TV)
3. Rudolph and Frosty's Christmas in July (1979)
4. Rudolph the Red-Nosed Reindeer and the Island of Misfit Toys (2001) (V)

== S ==
- Snake Eater
  1. Snake Eater (1989) (V)
  2. Snake Eater II: The Drug Buster (1991) (V)
  3. Snake Eater III: His Law (1992) (V)
  4. Hawk's Vengeance (1996) (V) (spin-off)
- Species
  1. Species (1995)
  2. Species II (1998)
  3. Species III (2004) (TV)
  4. Species – The Awakening (2007) (TV)
- The Substitute
  1. The Substitute (1996)
  2. The Substitute 2: School's Out (1998) (V)
  3. The Substitute 3: Winner Takes All (1999) (V)
  4. The Substitute: Failure Is Not an Option (2001) (V)
- Suicide Squad (a)
  1. Suicide Squad (2016)
  2. Suicide Squad: Hell to Pay (2018) (A) (V)
  3. Birds of Prey (2020) (spin-off)
  4. The Suicide Squad (2021)
- Sonic the Hedgehog *
  1. Sonic the Hedgehog (2020)
  2. Sonic the Hedgehog 2 (2022)
  3. Sonic the Hedgehog 3 (2024)
  4. Sonic the Hedgehog 4 (2027)
- San-Antonio
  1. Sale temps pour les mouches (1966)
  2. Béru et ces dames (1968)
  3. San-Antonio ne pense qu'à ça (1981)
  4. San-Antonio (2004)
- Scared Straight! *
  1. Scared Straight! (1978)
  2. Scared Straight! Another Story (1980)
  3. Scared Straight! 10 Years Later (1987)
  4. Scared Straight! 20 Years Later (1999)
- The Sex Life of the Belgians
  1. La Vie sexuelle des Belges 1950-1978 (1994)
  2. Camping Cosmos (1996)
  3. Fermeture de l'usine Renault à Vilvoorde (1998)
  4. La jouissance des hystériques (2000)
- Sherlock Holmes, portrayed by Matt Frewer
  1. The Hound of the Baskervilles (2000) (TV)
  2. The Sign of Four (2001) (TV)
  3. The Royal Scandal (2001) (TV)
  4. The Case of the Whitechapel Vampire (2002) (TV)
- Sherlock Holmes, portrayed by Peter O'Toole
  1. Sherlock Holmes and the Sign of Four (1983)
  2. Sherlock Holmes and the Valley of Fear (1983)
  3. Sherlock Holmes and a Study in Scarlet (1983)
  4. Sherlock Holmes and the Baskerville Curse (1983)
- Slayers *
  1. Slayers: The Motion Picture (1995)
  2. Slayers Return (1996)
  3. Slayers Great (1997)
  4. Slayers Gorgeous (1998)
- The Snake King's Wife
  1. The Snake King's Wife (1971)
  2. The Snake King's Wife Part 2 (1973)
  3. The Snake King's Child (2001)
  4. The Snake King's Grandchild (2006)
- The Snow Queen (A)
  1. The Snow Queen (2012)
  2. The Snow Queen 2 (2014)
  3. The Snow Queen 3: Fire and Ice (2016)
  4. The Snow Queen: Mirrorlands (2018)
- Space: 1999 *
  1. Alien Attack (1976) (TV)
  2. Journey Through the Black Sun (1976) (TV)
  3. Destination Moonbase-Alpha (1978) (TV)
  4. Cosmic Princess (1982) (TV)
- Squibs
  1. Squibs (1921)
  2. Squibs Wins the Calcutta Sweep (1922)
  3. Squibs M.P. (1923)
  4. Squibs' Honeymoon (1923)
- Starye pesni o glavnom
  1. Starye pesni o glavnom (1996) (TV)
  2. Starye pesni o glavnom 2 (1997) (TV)
  3. Starye pesni o glavnom 3 (1998) (TV)
  4. Starye pesni o glavnom. Postskriptum (2000) (TV)
- The Stepford Wives
  1. The Stepford Wives (1975)
  2. Revenge of the Stepford Wives (1980) (TV)
  3. The Stepford Children (1987) (TV)
  4. The Stepford Husbands (1996) (TV)
- Sten Stensson Steen
  1. Sten Stensson kommer till stan (1945)
  2. Ballongen (1946)
  3. Ljuset från Lund (1955)
  4. Sten Stensson kommer tillbaka (1963)
- Stompa
  1. Stompa & Co. (1962)
  2. Stompa selvfølgelig! (1963)
  3. Stompa forelsker seg (1965)
  4. Stompa til sjøs (1967)
- The Stranger
  1. Un dollaro tra i denti (1967)
  2. Un uomo, un cavallo, una pistola (1967)
  3. Lo straniero di silenzio (1968)
  4. Get Mean (1976)
- Strawberry Shortcake * (A)
  1. Strawberry Shortcake: The Sweet Dreams Movie (2006) (V)
  2. Strawberry Shortcake: Berry Blossom Festival (2007) (V)
  3. Strawberry Shortcake: Let's Dance (2007) (V)
  4. Strawberry Shortcake: Rockaberry Roll (2008) (V)
- Super Giant
  1. Atomic Rulers of the World (1965) (TV) (a.k.a. Atomic Rulers)
  2. Invaders from Space (1965) (TV)
  3. Attack from Space (1965) (TV)
  4. Evil Brain from Outer Space (1965) (TV)
- Super Fly
  1. Super Fly (1972)
  2. Super Fly T.N.T. (1973)
  3. The Return of Superfly (1990)
  4. Superfly (2018)
- Supernasen
  1. Piratensender Powerplay (1982)
  2. Die Supernasen (1983)
  3. Zwei Nasen tanken Super (1984)
  4. Die Einsteiger (1985)

== T ==
- Transporter *
  1. The Transporter (2002)
  2. Transporter 2 (2005)
  3. Transporter 3 (2008)
  4. The Transporter Refueled (2015) (reboot)
- Taboo American Style
  1. Taboo American Style 1 (1985)
  2. Taboo American Style 2 (1985)
  3. Taboo American Style 3 (1985)
  4. Taboo American Style 4 (1985)
- Tailspin Tommy
  1. Mystery Plane (1939)
  2. Stunt Pilot (1939)
  3. Sky Patrol (1939)
  4. Danger Flight (1939)
- Tammy *
  1. Tammy and the Bachelor (1957)
  2. Tammy Tell Me True (1961)
  3. Tammy and the Doctor (1963)
  4. Tammy and the Millionaire (1967)
- Teen Titans Go! *
  1. Teen Titans Go! To the Movies (2018)
  2. Teen Titans Go! vs. Teen Titans (2019) (V)
  3. Teen Titans Go! See Space Jam (2021) (TV)
  4. Teen Titans Go! & DC Super Hero Girls: Mayhem in the Multiverse (2022) (V)
- Tesna koža
  1. Tesna koža (1982)
  2. Tesna koza 2 (1987)
  3. Tesna koza 3 (1988)
  4. Tesna koza 4 (1991)
- A Thief on the Night
  1. A Thief in the Night (1972)
  2. A Distant Thunder (1978)
  3. Image of the Beast (1980)
  4. The Prodigal Planet (1983)
- The Three Musketeers (Michael York as D'Artagnan)
  1. The Three Musketeers (1973)
  2. The Four Musketeers (1974)
  3. The Return of the Musketeers (1989)
  4. La Femme Musketeer (2004) (TV)
- The Three Musketeers (1978 series)
  1. D'Artagnan and Three Musketeers (1978)
  2. Musketeers Twenty Years After (1992)
  3. The Secret of Queen Anne or Musketeers Thirty Years After (1993)
  4. The Return of the Musketeers, or The Treasures of Cardinal Mazarin (2007)
- Tiny Times
  1. Tiny Times (2013)
  2. Tiny Times 2 (2013)
  3. Tiny Times 3 (2014)
  4. Tiny Times 4 (2015)
- Toho Space Opera series
  1. The Mysterians (1957)
  2. Battle in Outer Space (1959)
  3. Gorath (1963)
  4. The War in Space (1977)
- Tom Lepski
  1. Try This One for Size (Sauf votre respect) (1989)
  2. Have a Nice Night (Passez une bonne nuit) (1990)
  3. Want to Stay Alive (Le denier du colt) (1990)
  4. Believed Violent (Présumé dangereux) (1990)
- La Noche del terror ciego (Tombs of the Blind Dead)
  1. La Noche del terror ciego (Tombs of the Blind Dead) (1971)
  2. El Ataque de los muertos sin ojos (Return of the Blind Dead) (1973)
  3. El Buque maldito (The Ghost Galleon) (1974)
  4. La Noche de las gaviotas (Night of the Seagulls) (1975)
- Tuntematon sotilas
  1. Tuntematon sotilas (1955)
  2. Täällä Pohjantähden alla (1968)
  3. Akseli ja Elina (1970)
  4. Täällä Pohjantähden alla II (2010)

== U ==
- Undisputed
  1. Undisputed (2002)
  2. Undisputed II: Last Man Standing (2007) (V)
  3. Undisputed III: Redemption (2010) (V)
  4. Boyka: Undisputed (2016) (V)
- Unauthorized series
  1. The Unauthorized Saved by the Bell Story (2014) (TV)
  2. The Unauthorized Full House Story (2015) (TV)
  3. The Unauthorized Beverly Hills, 90210 Story (2015) (TV)
  4. The Unauthorized Melrose Place Story (2015) (TV)
- Ultus (serials)
  1. Ultus, the Man from the Dead (1916)
  2. Ultus and the Grey Lady (1916)
  3. Ultus and the Secret of the Night (1916)
  4. Ultus and the Three-Button Mystery (1917)

== V ==
- Les Visiteurs
  1. Les Visiteurs (1993)
  2. The Visitors II: The Corridors of Time (1998)
  3. Just Visiting (2001) (remake)
  4. The Visitors: Bastille Day (2016)
- La Vérité si je mens ! (film series)
  1. La Vérité Si Je Mens! (1997)
  2. La Vérité si je mens ! 2 (2001)
  3. La Vérité si je mens ! 3 (2012)
  4. La Vérité si je mens ! Les débuts (2019) (prequel)
- Violent Shit
  1. Violent Shit (1989) (V)
  2. Violent Shit II: Mother Hold My Hand (1992) (V)
  3. Violent Shit III: Infantry of Doom (1999) (V)
  4. Karl the Butcher vs. Axe (2010) (V)

== W ==
- War and Peace (Voyna i mir)
1. Voyna i mir I: Andrey Bolkonskiy (1965)
2. Voyna i mir II: Natasha Rostova (1966)
3. Voyna i mir III: 1812 god (1967)
4. Voyna i mir IV: Pierre Bezukhov (1967)
- Watchers
1. Watchers (1988) (V)
2. Watchers II (1990) (V)
3. Watchers 3 (1994) (V)
4. Watchers Reborn (1998) (V)
- Wishmaster
1. Wishmaster (1997)
2. Wishmaster 2: Evil Never Dies (1999) (V)
3. Wishmaster 3: Beyond the Gates of Hell (2001) (V)
4. Wishmaster: The Prophecy Fulfilled (2002) (V)
- Wild Things
1. Wild Things (1998)
2. Wild Things 2 (2004) (TV)
3. Wild Things: Diamonds in the Rough (2005) (TV)
4. Wild Things: Foursome (2010) (V)
- What Price Glory
1. What Price Glory (1926)
2. The Cock-Eyed World (1929)
3. Women of All Nations (1931)
4. Hot Pepper (1933)
- Wild Bill Saunders
1. The Taming of the West (1939)
2. Pioneers of the Frontier (1940)
3. The Man from Tumbleweeds (1940)
4. The Return of Wild Bill (1940)
- Willi
1. What Is the Matter with Willi? (1970)
2. That Can't Shake Our Willi! (1970)
3. Our Willi Is the Best (1971)
4. Willi Manages the Whole Thing (1972)

== Z ==
- Zeitgeist
  1. Zeitgeist: The Movie (2007) (V)
  2. Zeitgeist: Addendum (2008) (V)
  3. Zeitgeist: Moving Forward (2011) (V)
  4. Zeitgeist: Requiem (2024) (V)
- Zoey 101
  1. Zoey 101: Spring Break-Up (2006) (TV)
  2. Zoey 101: The Curse of PCA (2007) (TV)
  3. Zoey 101: Goodbye Zoey? (2008) (TV)
  4. Zoey 101: Chasing Zoey (2008) (TV)
- Zombi
  1. Zombi 2 (1979)
  2. Zombi 3 (1987)
  3. Killing Birds (1987)
  4. After Death (1988)
