= List of science fiction television films =

This is a list of science fiction television films that did not have a theatrical release, including direct-to-video releases.

== 1950s–1960s ==
Year	Title	Director	Cast	Country	Notes
1954	Crash of Moons	Hollingsworth Morse	Richard Crane, Sally Mansfield, Robert Lyden, Scotty Beckett, Patsy Parsons	United States	Adventure Family
1959	Experiment in Evil	Jean Renoir	Jean-Louis Barrault, Teddy Bilis, Michel Vitold, Sylviane Margollé	France	Horror
1959	Murder and the Android	Alex Segal	Kevin McCarthy, Rip Torn, Suzanne Pleshette	United States	
1964	The Creeping Terror	Vic Savage	Vic Savage, Shannon O'Neil, William Thourlby	United States	Horror
1964	Invaders from Space	Teruo Ishii	Ken Utsui	Japan	
1965	Attack from Space	Teruo Ishii	Ken Utsui	Japan	Action
1965	Atomic Rulers of the World	Teruo Ishii	Ken Utsui, Junko Ikeuchi, Shôji Nakayama	Japan	Action Adventure
1966	Evil Brain From Outer Space	Koreyoshi Akasaka	Ken Utsui, Junko Ikeuchi, Minoru Takada	Japan	Action
1966	Purple Death From Outer Space	Ford Beebe	Buster Crabbe, Carol Hughes, Charles Middleton, Frank Shannon	United States	Recut of first half of the 1940 serial Flash Gordon Conquers the Universe
1967	The Eye Creatures	Larry Buchanan	John Ashley, Cynthia Hull, Warren Hammack, Chet Davis	United States	Comedy, horror
1967	Zontar, the Thing from Venus	Larry Buchanan	John Agar, Susan Bjurman	United States	Horror
1968	Mars Needs Women	Larry Buchanan	Tommy Kirk, Yvonne Craig, Patrick Cranshaw	United States	
1968	Shadow on the Land	Richard C. Sarafian	Jackie Cooper, John Forsythe, Gene Hackman	United States	Dystopian
1969	The Cape Canaveral Monsters	Phil Tucker	Robert Clarke, Darlene Tompkins, Arianne Ulmer	United States	Romance
1969	In the Year 2889	Larry Buchanan	Paul Petersen, Quinn O'Hara, Charla Doherty	United States	Horror

== 1970s ==
Year	Title	Director	Cast	Country	Notes
1970	Das Millionenspiel	Tom Toelle	Jörg Pleva, Suzanne Roquette, Dieter Thomas Heck	West Germany	
1970	Hauser's Memory	Boris Sagal	David McCallum, Susan Strasberg, Helmut Käutner	United States	
1970	The Love War	George McCowan	Lloyd Bridges, Angie Dickinson, Harry Basch	United States	
1970	Night Slaves	Ted Post	James Franciscus, Lee Grant, Scott Marlowe	United States	
1971	City Beneath the Sea	Irwin Allen	Stuart Whitman, Rosemary Forsyth, Robert Wagner	United States	
1971	Earth II	Tom Gries	Gary Lockwood, Scott Hylands, Hari Rhodes	United States	
1971	Escape	John Llewellyn Moxey	Christopher George, William Windom, Marlyn Mason	United States	
1971	The Last Child	John Llewellyn Moxey	Michael Cole, Van Heflin, Harry Guardino	United States	
1972	The Astronaut	Robert Michael Lewis	Jackie Cooper, Monte Markham, Richard Anderson	United States	
1972	Between Time and Timbuktu	Fred Barzyk	Bruce Morrow, Dortha Duckworth, William Hickey	United States	
1972	Probe	Russ Mayberry	Hugh O'Brian, Elke Sommer, Burgess Meredith	United States	
1972	The People	John Korty	Kim Darby, William Shatner, Diane Varsi	United States	
1973	Frankenstein: The True Story	Jack Smight	James Mason, Leonard Whiting, David McCallum	United Kingdom; United States	
1973	Genesis II	John Llewellyn Moxey	Alex Cord, Mariette Hartley, Ted Cassidy	United States	
1973	The Six Million Dollar Man	Richard Irving	Lee Majors, Barbara Anderson, Martin Balsam	United States	
1973	The Six Million Dollar Man: Wine, Women and War	Russ Mayberry	Lee Majors, Richard Anderson, Alan Oppenheimer	United States	
1973	The Six Million Dollar Man: The Solid Gold Kidnapping	Russ Mayberry	Lee Majors, Richard Anderson, Alan Oppenheimer	United States	
1973	The Stranger	Lee H. Katzin	Glenn Corbett, Cameron Mitchell, Sharon Acker	United States	
1973	World on a Wire	Rainer Werner Fassbinder	Klaus Löwitsch, Barbara Valentin, Mascha Rabben	West Germany	
1974	Das Blaue Palais: Das Genie	Rainer Erler	Rolf Henniger, Luminița Iacobescu, Silvano Tranquilli	West Germany; France	
1974	Das Blaue Palais: Der Verräter	Rainer Erler	Werner Rundshagen, Luminița Iacobescu, Silvano Tranquilli	West Germany; France	
1974	Das Blaue Palais: Das Medium	Rainer Erler	Angelika Bender, Edward Meeks, Luminița Iacobescu	West Germany; France	
1974	The Disappearance of Flight 412	Jud Taylor	Glenn Ford, Bradford Dillman, David Soul	United States	
1974	Killdozer!	Jerry London	Clint Walker, Robert Urich, Carl Betz	United States	
1974	The Last Days of Gomorrah	Helma Sanders-Brahms	Mascha Rabben, Matthias Fuchs, Ernst Jacobi	West Germany	German title: Die letzten Tage von Gomorrha
1974	Planet Earth	Marc Daniels	John Saxon, Janet Margolin, Ted Cassidy	United States	
1974	The Questor Tapes	Richard A. Colla	Robert Foxworth, Mike Farrell, John Vernon	United States	
1974	The Stranger Within	Lee Philips	Barbara Eden, George Grizzard, Joyce Van Patten	United States	
1974	Where Have All The People Gone?	John Llewellyn Moxey	Peter Graves, George O'Hanlon, Jr., Kathleen Quinlan	United States	
1975	Stowaway to the Moon	Andrew V. McLaglen	Lloyd Bridges, Jeremy Slate, Jim McMullan	United States	
1975	Strange New World	Robert Butler	John Saxon, Kathleen Miller, Keene Curtis	United States	
1976	Das Blaue Palais: Unsterblichkeit	Rainer Erler	Evelyn Opela, Eva Renzi, Peter Fricke	West Germany	
1976	Das Blaue Palais: Der Gigant	Rainer Erler	Dieter Laser, Jean-Pierre Zola, Ben Zeller	West Germany	
1976	The Day After Tomorrow	Charles Crichton	Brian Blessed, Joanna Dunham, Nick Tate, Katherine Levy, Martin Lev, Don Fellows	United Kingdom	
1977	Exo-Man	Richard Irving	David Ackroyd, Anne Schedeen, A. Martinez	United States	
1977	The Incredible Hulk	Kenneth Johnson	Bill Bixby, Susan Sullivan, Jack Colvin	United States	
1977	The Last Dinosaur	Alex Grasshoff, Tsugunobu Kotani	Richard Boone, Joan Van Ark, Steven Keats	United States; Japan	
1977	Man from Atlantis	Lee H. Katzin	Patrick Duffy, Belinda Montgomery, Dean Santoro	United States	
1977	Man from Atlantis II: The Death Scouts	Marc Daniels	Patrick Duffy, Belinda Montgomery, Kenneth Tigar	United States	
1977	Man from Atlantis III: Killer Spores	Reza Badiyi	Patrick Duffy, Belinda Montgomery, Alan Fudge	United States	
1977	Man from Atlantis IV: The Disappearances	Charles S. Dubin	Patrick Duffy, Belinda Montgomery, Alan Fudge	United States	
1977	The Man with the Power	Nicholas Sgarro	Bob Neill, Tim O'Connor, Vic Morrow	United States	
1978	A Fire in the Sky	Jerry Jameson	Richard Crenna, Elizabeth Ashley, David Dukes	United States	
1978	The Clone Master	Don Medford	Art Hindle, Robyn Douglass, John Van Dreelan	United States	
1978	One Million Year Trip: Bander Book	Osamu Tezuka	Yū Mizushima (voice), Mami Koyama (voice), Masatō Ibu (voice)	Japan	Anime television special
1978	Star Wars Holiday Special	Steve Binder	Mickey Morton, Patty Maloney, Mark Hamill	United States	
1978	The Time Machine	Alexander Singer	John Beck, Priscilla Barnes, Andrew Duggan	United States	
1978	Vacuum Cleaner	Avo Paistik		Soviet Union	Animated short film. Estonian title: Tolmuimeja
1979	Darker Side of Terror	Gus Trikonis	Robert Forster, Adrienne Barbeau, Ray Milland	United States	
1979	Jasio	Krzysztof Kiwerski		Poland	Animated short film
1979	Space Battleship Yamato: The New Voyage	Toshio Masuda, Takeshi Shirato	Kei Tomiyama (voice), Yôko Asagami (voice), Shūsei Nakamura (voice)	Japan	
1979	Undersea Super Train: Marine Express	Satoshi Dezaki	Kōsei Tomita (voice), Nachi Nozawa (voice), Kōji Yada (voice)	Japan	Anime television special

== 1980s ==
Year	Title	Director	Cast	Country	Notes
1980	Brave New World	Brian Brinckerhoff	Julie Cobb, Bud Cort, Keir Dullea	United States	
1980	Fumoon	Hisashi Sakaguchi	Hiroshi Suzuki (voice), Chikao Ôtsuka (voice), Kaneto Shiozawa (voice)	Japan	Anime television special
1980	The Henderson Monster	Waris Hussein	Stephen Collins, Larry Gates, Christine Lahti	United States	
1980	The Lathe of Heaven	David Loxton, Fred Barzyk	Bruce Davison, Kevin Conway, Margaret Avery	United States	
1980	The Girl, the Gold Watch & Everything	William Wiard	Robert Hays, Pam Dawber, Zhora Lampert	United States	
1980	The Martian Chronicles	Michael Anderson	Rock Hudson, Gayle Hunnicutt, Bernie Casey	United States	
1981-1983	Space Aliens	Aleksey Solov'yov	Nikolay Karachentsov (voice), Gennadiy Korotkov (voice), Eduard Kol'bus (voice)	Soviet Union	Two-part animated short film. Russian title: Космические пришельцы, tr. Kosmicheskiye prishel'tsy
1982	Andromeda Stories	Masamitsu Sasaki	Mami Koyama (voice), Tōru Furuya (voice), Toshiko Fujita (voice), Chiyoko Kawashima (voice)	Japan	Anime television special
1982	Computercide	Robert Michael Lewis	Joe Cortese, Tom Clancy, Susan George	United States	
1982	The Mysterious Two	Gary Sherman	John Forsythe, Priscilla Pointer, Noah Beery Jr.	United States	
1983	The Day After	Nicholas Meyer	Jason Robards, JoBeth Williams, Steve Guttenberg, John Lithgow	United States	
1983	The Invisible Woman	Alan J. Levi	Bob Denver, Alexa Hamilton, Jonathan Banks	United States	
1983	Prisoners of the Lost Universe	Terry Marcel	Richard Hatch, Kay Lenz, John Saxon	United Kingdom	
1983	Prototype	David Greene	David Morse, Christopher Plummer	United States	
1983	Overdrawn at the Memory Bank	Douglas Williams	Raul Julia, Linda Griffiths	United States	
1983	Starflight: The Plane That Couldn't Land	Jerry Jameson	Lee Majors, Hal Linden, Lauren Hutton	United States	
1983	A Time Slip of 10,000 Years: Prime Rose	Osamu Dezaki, Satoshi Dezaki	Yū Mizushima (voice), Mari Okamoto (voice), Junko Hori (voice)	Japan	Anime television special
1983	V	Kenneth Johnson	Marc Singer, Faye Grant, Jane Badler	United States	
1983	V: The Final Battle	Richard T. Heffron	Marc Singer, Faye Grant, Jane Badler	United States	
1984	984: Prisoner of the Future	Tibor Takács	Stephen Markle	Canada	
1984	Caravan of Courage: An Ewok Adventure	John Korty	Warwick Davis	United States	
1985	20 Minutes into the Future	Rocky Morton, Annabel Jankel	Matt Frewer, Nickolas Grace, Amanda Pays	United Kingdom	
1985	The Blue Yonder	Mark Rosman	Max Knickerbocker, Jonathan Knicks, Art Carney	United States	
1985	Ewoks: The Battle for Endor	Jim Wheat, Ken Wheat	Wilford Brimley	United States	
1985	From the Diaries of Ijon Tichy: A Voyage to Interopia	Gennadiy Tishchenko		Soviet Union	Animated short film. Russian title: Из дневников Ийона Тихого. Путешествие на Интеропию, tr. Iz dnevnikov Iyona Tikhogo. Puteshestviye na Interopiyu
1985	J.O.E. and the Colonel	Ronald Satlof	Gary Kasper, William Lucking, Terence Knox	United States	
1985	Murder in Space	Steven Hilliard Stern	Wilford Brimley, Martin Balsam, Arthur Hill	United States	
1985	Starcrossed	Jeffrey Bloom	James Spader, Belinda Bauer, Peter Kowanko	United States	
1985	Survival Earth	Peter McCubbin	Nancy Cser, Jeff Holec, Craig Williams	Canada	
1985	Two Tickets to India	Roman Kachanov	Yuriy Andreyev (voice), Mariya Vinogradova (voice), Yuriy Volyntsev (voice)	Soviet Union	Animated short film
1986	Annihilator	Michael Chapman	Mark Lindsay Chapman, Susan Blakely, Lisa Blount	United States	
1986	Condor	Virgil W. Vogel	Ray Wise, Wendy Kilbourne, Vic Polizos	United States	
1987	Not Quite Human	Steven Hilliard Stern	Alan Thicke, Jay Underwood, Kristy Swanson	United States	
1987	The Man Who Fell to Earth	Bobby Roth	Lewis Smith, James Laurenson, Robert Picardo	United States	
1987	Timestalkers	Michael Schultz	William Devane, Lauren Hutton, John Ratzenberger	United States	
1988	Earth Star Voyager	James Goldstone	Duncan Regehr, Brian McNamara, Julia Montgomery	United States	
1988	Mars: Base One	Jim Drake	Jonathan Brandis, Marty Pollio, Christy Taylor	United States	
1988	Out of Time	Robert Butler	Bruce Abbott, Adam Ant, Bill Maher	United States	
1988	Prisoners of Yamagiri-Maru	Aleksey Solov'yov	Tat'yana Aksyuta (voice), Tat'yana Kur'yanova (voice), Vsevolod Larionov (voice)	Soviet Union	Puppet animation short film
1988	Something Is Out There	Richard A. Colla	Maryam d'Abo, Joseph Cortese, Kim Delaney	United States	
1989	Bionic Showdown: The Six Million Dollar Man and the Bionic Woman	Alan J. Levi	Lee Majors, Lindsay Wagner, Richard Anderson	United States	
1989	The Lost Galaxy	Anatoliy Solin, Inna Pshenichnaya	Lev Durov (voice), Natal'ya Romashenko (voice)	Soviet Union	Animated short film. Russian title: Упущенная галактика, tr. Upushchennaya galaktika
1989	Not Quite Human II	Eric Luke	Alan Thicke, Jay Underwood, Robyn Lively	United States	
1989	Here There Be Tygers	Vladimir Samsonov	Rogvold Sukhoverko (voice), Vsevolod Larionov (voice), Yuriy Puzyrev (voice)	Soviet Union	Animated short film. Russian title: Здесь могут водиться тигры, tr. Zdes' mogut vodit'sya tigry
1989	Murder by Moonlight	Michael Lindsay-Hogg	Brigitte Nielsen, Julian Sands	United Kingdom	

== 1990s ==
Year	Title	Director	Cast	Country	Notes
1990	Megaville	Peter Lehner	Billy Zane, J.C. Quinn	United States	
1990	The Murderer	Bruce Weitz	Cedric Smith, Donna Akersten, Michael Haigh, Boženka (Bobi) Vondruška	United States	Filmed in New Zealand, Oriental Bay
1990	Running Against Time	Bruce Seth Green	Robert Hays, Catherine Hicks, Sam Wanamaker	United States	
1990	Self-Experiment	Peter Vogel	Johanna Schall, Hansjürgen Hürrig, Katrin Klein	East Germany	German title: Selbstversuch
1991	City Cat		Danielle Peyich, Branislav Kerac	Serbia	
1991	Frankenstein: The College Years	Tom Shadyac	William Ragsdale, Christopher Daniel Barnes, Vincent Hammond	United States	
1991	Knight Rider 2000	Alan J. Levi	David Hasselhoff, William Daniels, Edward Mulhare	United States	
1991	Plymouth	Lee David Zlotoff	Robin Frates, Joseph Gordon-Levitt, Richard Hamilton	United States	
1991	Not of This World	Jon Hess	Lisa Hartman, Pat Hingle	United States	
1991-1992	Vampires of Geon	Gennadiy Tishchenko	Aleksandr Lushchik (voice), Vsevolod Abdulov (voice), Rogvold Sukhoverko (voice)	Soviet Union	Two-part animated short film
1992	Danger Island	Tommy Lee Wallace	Lisa Banes, Richard Beymer, Maria Celedonio	United States	
1992	Disasters in Time	David N. Twohy	Jeff Daniels, Ariana Richards, Marily Lightstone	United States	
1992	Duplicates	Sandor Stern	Gregory Harrison, Kim Greist, Cicely Tyson	United States	
1992–4	Running Delilah	Richard Franklin	Kim Cattrall, Billy Zane, François Guétary, Diana Rigg	United States	
1992	Still Not Quite Human	Eric Luke	Alan Thicke, Jay Underwood, Rosa Nevin	United States	
1993	12:01	Jack Sholder	Jonathan Silverman, Helen Slater, Martin Landau	United States	
1993	1994 Baker Street: Sherlock Holmes Returns	Kenneth Johnson	Anthony Higgins, Debrah Farentino, Ken Pogue	United States	
1993	Babylon 5: The Gathering	Richard Compton	Michael O'Hare, Tamlyn Tomita, Jerry Doyle	United States	
1993	Daybreak	Stephen Tolkin	Cuba Gooding, Jr., Moira Kelly, Martha Plimpton, Omar Epps	United States	
1993	Frankenstein	David Wickes	Patrick Bergin, Randy Quaid, John Mills	United States	
1993	Journey to the Center of the Earth	William Dear	David Dundara, Farrah Forke, Kim Miyori	United States	
1993	Lifepod	Ron Silver	Robert Loggia, Jessica Tuck, Adam Storke	United States	
1993	Official Denial	Brian Trenchard-Smith	Erin Gray, Parker Stevenson	United States	
1993	The Tommyknockers	John Power	Jimmy Smits, Marg Helgenberger	United States	Miniseries
1993	Wild Palms	Peter Hewitt, Keith Gordon	James Belushi, Dana Delany, Robert Loggia	United States	
1993	The Fire Next Time (miniseries)	Tom McLoughlin	Craig T. Nelson, Bonnie Bedelia, Ashley Jones	United States	
1994	Alien Nation: Dark Horizon	Kenneth Johnson	Gary Graham, Eric Pierpoint, Buck Francisco	United States	
1994-1995	AMBA	Gennadiy Tishchenko	Vsevolod Abdulov (voice), Lyudmila Gnilova (voice), Aleksandr Lushchik (voice)	Russia	Two-part animated short film
1994	Bionic Ever After?	Steven Stafford	Lee Majors, Lindsay Wagner, Richard Anderson	United States	
1994	The Companion	Gary Fleder	Kathryn Harrold, Bruce Greenwood, Talia Balsam	United States	
1994	Island City	Jorge Montesi	Kevin Conroy, Brenda Strong, Eric McCormack	United States	
1994	Knight Rider 2010	Sam Pillsbury	Richard Joseph Paul, Hudson Leick, Brion James	United States	
1994	The Lifeforce Experiment	Piers Haggard	Donald Sutherland, Mimi Kuzyk	Canada	
1994	New Eden	Alan Metzger	Stephen Baldwin	United States	
1994	TekWar: TekLords	George Bloomfield	Greg Evigan, Eugene Clark, Torri Higginson	Canada	
1995	Alien Nation: Body and Soul	Kenneth Johnson	Gary Graham, Eric Pierpoint, Buck Francisco	United States	
1995	The Android Affair	Richard Kletter	Harley Jane Kozak, Griffin Dunne, Ossie Davis	United States	
1995	Harrison Bergeron	Bruce Pittman	Sean Astin, Christopher Plummer	United States	
1995	It Came From Outer Space II	Roger Duchowny	Brian Kerwin, Elizabeth Peña, Jonathan Carrasco	United States	
1995	The Langoliers	Tom Holland	Patricia Wettig, Dean Stockwell, David Morse, Kate Maberly	United States	Miniseries
1995	Not of This Earth	Terence H. Winkless	Michael York, Mason Adams, Parker Stevenson	United States	
1995	Suspect Device	Rick Jacobson	C. Thomas Howell, Stacey Travis, Jed Allan	United States	
1995	The Wasp Woman	Jim Wynorski	Jennifer Rubin, Doug Wert, Maria Ford	United States	
1996	Alien Nation: The Enemy Within	Kenneth Johnson	Gary Graham, Eric Pierpoint, Buck Francisco	United States	
1996	Alien Nation: Millennium	Kenneth Johnson	Gary Graham, Eric Pierpoint, Buck Francisco	United States	
1996	Doctor Who	Geoffrey Sax	Paul McGann, Daphne Ashbrook	United Kingdom; United States	
1996	Project: ALF	Dick Lowry	Paul Fusco, Jensen Daggett, William O'Leary	United States	
1996	Special Report: Journey to Mars	Robert Mandel	Keith Carradine, Judge Reinhold, Alfre Woodard	United States	
1996	Star Command	Jim Johnston	Chad Everett, Morgan Fairchild, Jay Underwood	United States; Germany	
1996	Them	Bill L. Norton	Scott Patterson, Clare Carey, Dustin Voight	United States	
1996	Yesterday's Target	Barry Sampson	Daniel Baldwin, Stacey Haiduk, T. K. Carter	United States	
1997	20,000 Leagues Under the Sea	Rod Hardy	Michael Caine, Patrick Dempsey, Mia Sara	United States	
1997	20,000 Leagues Under the Sea	Michael Anderson	Richard Crenna, Julie Cox, Paul Gross	United States	
1997	Alien Nation: The Udara Legacy	Kenneth Johnson	Gary Graham, Eric Pierpoint, Buck Francisco	United States	
1997	Cloned	Douglas Barr	Elizabeth Perkins, Bradley Whitford, Alan Rosenberg	United States	
1997	Dead by Midnight	Jim McBride	Timothy Hutton, Suzy Amis, John Glover	United States	
1997	Doom Runners	Brendan Maher	Lea Moreno, Tim Curry, Dean O'Gorman	United States	
1998	Babylon 5: In the Beginning	Mike Vejar	Bruce Boxleitner, Mira Furlan, Richard Biggs	United States	
1997	Invasion	Armand Mastroianni	Luke Perry, Rebecca Gayheart, Kim Cattrall	United States	
1997	Moonbase	Paolo Mazzucato	Scott Plank, Jocelyn Seagrave, Kurt Fuller	United States	
1997	When Time Expires	David Bourla	Richard Grieco, Cynthia Geary, Mark Hamill	United States	
1998	Babylon 5: The River of Souls	Mike Vejar	Jerry Doyle, Tracy Soggins, Jeff Conaway	United States	
1998	Babylon 5: Thirdspace	Mike Vejar	Bruce Boxleitner, Claudia Christian, Mira Firlan	United States	
1998	Brave New World	Leslie Libman, Larry Williams	Peter Gallagher, Leonard Nimoy, Tim Guinee	United States	
1998	Falling Fire	Daniel D'Or	Michael Paré, Heidi Von Palleske, Christian Vidosa	United States	
1998	Gargantua	Bradford May	Adam Baldwin, Emile Hirsch, Julie Carmen	United States	
1998	Tempting Fate	Peter Werner	Tate Donovan, Abraham Benrubi, Ming-Na Wen	United States	
1998	Nightworld: 30 Years to Life	Michael Tuchner	Robert Hays, Hugh O'Connor, Christien Anholt	Canada; United States	
1998	Virtual Obsession	Mick Garris	Peter Gallagher, Bridgette Wilson, Mimi Rogers	United States	
1998	The Warlord: Battle for the Galaxy	Joe Dante	John Corbett, Carolyn McCormick, John Pyper Ferguson	United States	
1999	Mr. Murder	Dick Lowry	Stephen Baldwin, Julie Warner, Bill Smitrovich	United States	

== 2000s ==
Year	Title	Director	Cast	Country	Notes
2001	How to Make a Monster	George Huang	Clea DuVall, Steven Culp, Tyler Mane	United States	
2002	Lost on Mars	Eric Shook	David Long, Gretchen Maxwell, Kelli Wilson	United States	
2002	Teenage Caveman	Larry Clark	Andrew Keegan, Tara Subkoff, Richard Hillman	United States	
2002	Voices of a Distant Star	Makoto Shinkai		Japan	Anime
2003	Beyond Re-Animator	Brian Yuzna	Jeffrey Combs, Tommy Dean Musset, Jason Barry	Spain; United States	
2007	2nd Adam	Erik De La Torre Stahl	Elisa Gautier, John Paget, Robert Mason, Erik Stahl	Mexico	
2007	TRUST.Welfare	Eicke Bettinga	Florian Panzner, Inga Birkenfeld, Irm Hermann	Germany	
2008	The Day the Earth Stopped	C. Thomas Howell	C. Thomas Howell, Judd Nelson	United States	
2008	Stargate: The Ark of Truth	Robert C. Cooper	Ben Browder, Amanda Tapping, Michael Shanks	United States	Military
2008	Stargate: Continuum	Martin Wood	Richard Dean Anderson, Ben Browder, Amanda Tapping	United States	Military
2009	The Day of the Triffids	Nick Copus	Ewen Bremner, William Ilkley, Genevieve O'Reilly	United Kingdom	

== 2010s ==
Year	Title	Director	Cast	Country	Notes
2010	Dark Metropolis	Stewart St. John	Bailey Chase, Pamela Clay, Kristy Hulslander, Matt O'Toole, Arthur Roberts, Eric Woods	United States	Dystopian thriller
2010	Meteor Apocalypse	Micho Rutare	Joe Lando, Cooper Harris, Claudia Christian	United States	
2010	Opponent	Colin Theys	Kevin Shea, Angela Relucio, Ashley Bates	United States	
2011	Ultramarines: The Movie	Martyn Pick	Terence Stamp, Sean Pertwee, John Hurt, Donald Sumpter	United Kingdom; Canada	
2013	Independence Daysaster	W.D. Hogan	Ryan Merriman, Emily Holmes, Keenan Tracey, Andrea Brooks	Canada	Action Adventure Thriller
2014	Arachnicide	Paolo Bertola	Gino Barzacchi, Gabriel Cash, Riccardo Serventi Longhi	Italy	Action Comedy Horror
2014	Christmas Icetastrophe	Jonathan Winfrey	Victor Webster, Jennifer Spence	United States	Action Adventure Drama Thriller
2014	Die Gstettensaga: The Rise of Echsenfriedl	Johannes Grenzfurthner	Lukas Tagwerker, Sophia Grabner, Jeff Ricketts	Austria	
2015	Lavalantula	Mike Mendez	Steve Guttenberg, Nia Peeples, Patrick Renna	United States	Action Adventure Comedy Horror Thriller
2017	The Other Side of the Lake the Purple Girl: Episode V - Battle in the Sky	Erik De La Torre Stahl	Bucket Ademov	United States	
2018	Marvel Rising Secret Warriors	Alfred Gimeno	Kim Raver, Chloe Bennet, Milana Vayntrub, Kathreen Khavari	United States	

== See also ==
- List of programs broadcast by Syfy
- List of science fiction films
- Television movie
