= History of science fiction films =

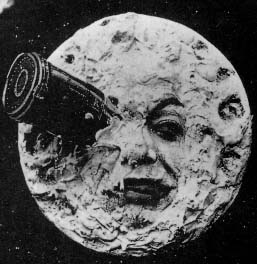
A still from the 1902 film Le Voyage dans La Lune (A Trip to the Moon).

The history of science fiction films parallels that of the motion picture industry as a whole, although it took several decades before the genre was taken seriously. Since the 1960s, major science fiction films have succeeded in pulling in large audience shares, and films of this genre have become a regular staple of the film industry. Science fiction films have led the way in special effects technology, and have also been used as a vehicle for social commentary.

== Silent film ==
Science fiction films appeared very early in the silent film era. The initial attempts were short films of typically 1 to 2 minutes in duration, shot in black and white, but sometimes with colour tinting. These usually had a technological theme, and were often intended to be humorous. In Things to Come: An Illustrated History of the Science Fiction Film, Douglas Menville and R. Reginald judged Gugusse and the Automaton to be the most significant scientifically themed film of 1897, and suggested that it “may be the first true SF [science fiction] film.” However, A Trip to the Moon, created by Georges Méliès in 1902, is often considered to be the first science fiction film. It drew upon Jules Verne and H. G. Wells in its depiction of a spacecraft being launched to the Moon in a large cannon. Its ground-breaking special effects pioneered the way for future science-fiction films, and it became largely popular after its release.

Science fiction literature would continue to influence early films. Jules Verne's 1870 classic novel Twenty Thousand Leagues Under the Seas was adapted multiple times, notably into the 1916 film, one of the first feature-length science fiction films. Others, such as Edison Studios' 1910 adaptation of Mary Shelley's 1818 novel Frankenstein; or, The Modern Prometheus, and the 1913 adaptation of Robert Louis Stevenson's Dr. Jekyll and Mr. Hyde, brought the concept of mad scientists to cinema. These two also demonstrated an early overlap between the science fiction and horror genres. Into the 1920s, another success was The Lost World, based on Sir Arthur Conan Doyle's book of the same name. It was one of the earliest examples of stop-motion animation, and also introduced several now-famous science fiction concepts, like monsters, dinosaurs, and lost worlds.

Meanwhile, in Europe, the 1920s displayed a distinct difference from American cinema. European film-makers began to use the genre for prediction and social commentary. In Soviet Russia, the film Aelita discussed social revolution in the context of a voyage to Mars. In Germany, one of the most important pioneers of science fiction was the Expressionist Fritz Lang. His 1927 film Metropolis was the most expensive film ever released up to that point. Set in the year 2026, it included elements such as an autonomous robot, a mad scientist, a dystopian society, and elaborate futuristic sets. His 1929 work Woman in the Moon came as the silent film era was coming to a close, and notably introduced the idea of counting down the time to a rocket launch.

== 1930s and 1940s ==
Movies during the 1930s were largely influenced by the advent of sound and dialogue, and by the effects of the Great Depression that began in 1929. Audiences began to pursue films with more escapist themes, leading to a decline in serious speculative films. After the failure of the big-budget 1930 American film Just Imagine, studios were reluctant to finance the expensive futuristic sets necessary for this type of film. Although the 1936 British film Things to Come, written by H. G. Wells, projected the world 100 years into the future and forecasted the advent of World War II, it too was a box-office flop, and films with serious speculation and visual spectacle of the future would largely disappear until the 1950s.

Instead, the decade saw the rise of film serials: low-budget, quickly-produced shorts depicting futuristic, heroic adventures. action, melodramatic plots, and gadgetry. The first was The Phantom Empire (1935) starring Gene Autry, about an advanced underground civilization which had ray guns and television communication screens. Some of the most popular of the era were the various Flash Gordon films, the exploits of Buck Rogers, and others, such as the quasi-science fiction Dick Tracy. They continued to use science fiction elements like space travel, high-tech gadgets, plots for world domination, and mad scientists. Echoes of this style can still be seen in science fiction and action films today, as well as in the various James Bond films.

Other elements of science fiction were carried into the burgeoning horror genre, driven by the massive success of the Universal Studios' Frankenstein and its sequel Bride of Frankenstein. Many Universal Horror films, such as The Invisible Man and Dr. Jekyll and Mr. Hyde prominently featured mad scientists and experiments gone wrong, as did other monster movies like The Vampire Bat, Doctor X, and Dr. Cyclops.

Sequels to successful horror films continued into World War II, and the 1940s also saw the development of patriotic superhero serials like Fleischer Studio's animated Superman short subjects that often doubled as war propaganda. However, science fiction as an independent genre lay mostly dormant throughout the war.

== Post-War and 1950s ==
Two events at the end of World War II significantly influenced the science fiction genre. The development of the atomic bomb increased interest in science, as well as anxiety about the possible apocalyptic effects of a nuclear war. The period also saw the beginning of the Cold War, and widespread Communist paranoia in the United States. These led to a major increase in the number of science fiction films being created throughout the 1950s, and creating a Golden Age of Science Fiction that matched the one taking place in literature.

One of the earlier and most important films of the era was the widely publicized Destination Moon, released in 1950. It follows a nuclear-powered rocketship carrying four men to the moon, against a background of competition against the Soviets. With a script co-written by Robert A. Heinlein and astronomical sets by renowned space artist Chesley Bonestell, the film was a commercial and artistic success, and it brought about more studio financing of science fiction films. The producer of Destination Moon was notably George Pal who also helped create When Worlds Collide, The Time Machine, The War of the Worlds, and the pseudo-documentary of crewed space exploration Conquest of Space. Although Conquest of Space was a commercial failure that set back Pal's career, the other four each won an Academy Award for Best Visual Effects, which demonstrated the increased technical excellence and critical recognition of the genre.

Alien films saw a huge surge in popularity during the 1950s. Many featured political commentary being mixed with the concept of UFOs, which had become ingrained in the public consciousness after the Kenneth Arnold and Roswell incidents of 1947. Two of the first were The Day the Earth Stood Still, directed by Robert Wise, and Howard Hawks' The Thing from Another World, with their contrasting views of first contact. While the former had a peaceful race of aliens urging humans to control their use of nuclear weapons, the latter's title creature stalked a crew in the Arctic, with the paranoid final words, "Watch the skies!" The idea of alien invasions as an allegory recurred with Don Siegel's 1956 film, Invasion of the Body Snatchers. Critically acclaimed as a classic, it has been viewed as both a veiled criticism of McCarthyism, or a cautionary story of Communist infiltration.

Another important UFO film, Earth vs. the Flying Saucers, had special effects created by Ray Harryhausen, a master of stop-motion animation that had previously worked with King Kong animator, Willis O'Brien. His work also appeared in such films as 20 Million Miles to Earth, and 1953's hit film, The Beast from 20,000 Fathoms. That film, based on a short story by Ray Bradbury, featured the fictional Rhedosaurus, which is thawed out of the Arctic by atomic testing and begins to ravage sections of the United States. Its massive success set off a new wave of science-fiction monster films. Like the 1930s, these movies demonstrated a mix of horror and science fiction, now often mixed with anxiety of nuclear technology or the dangers of outer space. Them!, It Came from Beneath the Sea, and Tarantula, released within two years of The Beast from 20,000 Fathoms, all featured over-sized animals created by nuclear testing. It! The Terror from Beyond Space, The Blob, The Angry Red Planet, and Kronos, on the other hand, featured alien monsters. Still others, like The Fly, The Amazing Colossal Man, and The Incredible Shrinking Man, focused on human mutation.

This trend was not limited to the United States; perhaps the most successful monster movies were the kaiju films released by Japanese film studio Toho. The 1954 film Godzilla, with the title monster attacking Tokyo, gained immense popularity, spawned multiple sequels, led to other kaiju films like Rodan, and created one of the most recognizable monsters in cinema history. Japanese science fiction films, particularly the tokusatsu and kaiju genres, were known for their extensive use of special effects, and gained worldwide popularity in the 1950s. Kaiju and tokusatsu films, notably Warning from Space (1956), sparked Stanley Kubrick's interest in science fiction films and influenced 2001: A Space Odyssey (1968). According to his biographer John Baxter, despite their "clumsy model sequences, the films were often well-photographed in colour ... and their dismal dialogue was delivered in well-designed and well-lit sets."

The financial success of these films relied on studios drawing in large teenage audiences, taking advantage of popular techniques such as drive-in theaters and 3D, notably used by movies such as Creature from the Black Lagoon or Gog. In addition to increasing the audience size, many science fiction films of the time were created with minuscule budgets; the phrase "B-movie" came to signify a formulaic genre film made with low production costs (usually for less than $400,000). This concept was exemplified in a studio memo about the movie Them! that stated, "We want a picture with the same exploitation possibilities as we had in The Beast from 20,000 Fathoms. We all know this will not be a 'class production' but it has all the ingredients of being a successful box office attraction." The idea of low-quality, low-cost films were taken to an extreme by directors such as Roger Corman, Coleman Francis, and Ed Wood, and the latter's Plan 9 from Outer Space has been hailed as one of the worst films of all time.

However, in the second half of the decade, the steady success of the genre led to some studios attempting serious films with large budgets, including the coldly realistic depiction of a post-nuclear war world, On the Beach, and Forbidden Planet, a science fiction re-imagining of Shakespeare's The Tempest. The second film would influence the genre for years to come; it included the first all-electronic music score, introduced the character Robby the Robot, and served as the inspiration for Gene Roddenberry's Star Trek.

The success of science fiction films also saw the genre grow internationally. In Britain, there was a period of notable production, with Hammer Films adaptations of Nigel Kneale's Quatermass series. The success of the television versions inspired the company to commission a series of film adaptations. Science fiction films also began appearing in Bengali cinema, including Satyajit Ray's 1958 magical realist film Parash Pathar (The Philosopher's Stone), and Ritwik Ghatak's 1958 film Ajantrik (The Unmechanical) that examined the relationship between man and machine.

== 1960s ==
After the rush of science fiction films in the 1950s, there were relatively few in the 1960s; many of those made were more aimed at children more than an adult audience, mirroring the prevalence of children's television programmes of the period. There continued to be adaptations of the stories of Verne and H. G. Wells, including films of The Time Machine and First Men in the Moon, but these seemed somewhat like a continuation of the 1950s science fiction films.

Galaxy Science Fiction editor Frederik Pohl wrote in 1962 that the last good science fiction film most readers would be able to name was Forbidden Planet. He explained that the studio system produced "very big" or "very little" films. Large films were often remakes of other large films, few of which were science fiction, and B movies used non-genre writers instead of being based on existing quality science fiction. In 1968, he said after 2001 that "the science fiction movie we've all been waiting for still hasn't come along", and that Things to Come was the most recent serious large-budget film with good actors and a science fiction screenwriter. However, in the second half of the 1960s a number of exceptional films appeared, transforming science fiction cinema. 1966 saw two significant films released: first Fahrenheit 451 was a social commentary on freedom of speech and government restrictions and then Fantastic Voyage where the science fiction film "boldly went where no man had gone before" when Raquel Welch ventured inside a human body. Finally in 1968 the extremely camp Barbarella paid homage to the sillier side of earlier science fiction.

In the late 1960s, the Indian director Satyajit Ray planned on making The Alien, a story about a boy in Bengal befriending an alien. Production of the film was cancelled, but the script was released and available throughout the world. Ray believed that the 1982 Steven Spielberg film E.T. the Extra-Terrestrial was based on The Alien, though Spielberg states that it was not.

Planet of the Apes (1968) was extremely popular, spawning four sequels and a television series. While not strictly-speaking science fiction, some of the James Bond films included a variety of science fiction-like gadgetry.

Possibly the most significant Science Fiction film of the 1960s was 2001: A Space Odyssey of 1968, directed by Stanley Kubrick and written by Kubrick and Arthur C. Clarke. 2001 is regarded as the seminal entry in the science-fiction genre as it influenced several later entries. Steven Spielberg, one of the genre's most well-known figures aptly called 2001, 'the big bang of science-fiction.'

This movie was groundbreaking in the quality of its visual effects, in its realistic portrayal of space travel, and in the epic and transcendent scope of its story. Science fiction movies that followed this film would enjoy increasingly larger budgets and ever improving special effects. Clarke has told of screening earlier science-fiction films for Kubrick, and Kubrick pronouncing them all awful, without exception, even Things to Come. 2001 was the first science fiction art film and had a philosophical scope that earlier films had not attempted. Many critics called it an incomprehensible mess when it first appeared. Today, it is widely lauded by critics as one of the greatest films of all time.

In 1963, India based Tamil movie named KALAI ARASI is the first movie based on aliens in India which is directed by A.Kasilingam.It is released on 19 April 1963.Though the idea is good but it became a failure at box office.Today it is widely lauded by critics as one of the greatest innovative movies in the Tamil film industry.

== 1970s ==
There was resurgence of interest in science fiction films with a "space adventure" theme in the 1970s. Star Wars and Close Encounters of the Third Kind, both released in 1977, contained a mystical element reminiscent of 2001: A Space Odyssey. The space discoveries of the 1970s created a growing sense of marvel about the universe that was reflected in these films.

However, the early 1970s also saw the continued theme of paranoia, with humanity under threat from ecological or technological adversaries of its own creation. Notable films of this period included Stanley Kubrick's A Clockwork Orange 1971 (man vs. brainwashing), THX 1138 1971 (man vs. the state), Silent Running 1972 (ecology), the sequels to Planet of the Apes (man vs. evolution), and Westworld 1973 (man vs. robot).

The conspiracy thriller film was a popular staple of this period, where the paranoia of plots by the national government or corporate entities had replaced the implied communist enemy of the 1950s. These films included such efforts as Alien 1979, Capricorn One 1977, Invasion of the Body Snatchers, Logan's Run 1976, The Day of the Dolphin 1973, Soylent Green 1973 and Futureworld 1976.

The slow-paced Solaris 1972 made by Andrei Tarkovsky (and remade as a much shorter film by Steven Soderbergh in 2002) matches and in some assessments exceeds 2001 in its visuals and philosophic scope, while other critics find it plodding and pretentious.

The science fiction comedy had what may have been its finest hours in the 1970s, with Woody Allen's Sleeper 1973 and Dan O'Bannon's Dark Star 1974.

After the huge box office successes in 1977 of Star Wars and Close Encounters of the Third Kind were followed in 1978 by Superman, three notable science fiction films appeared 1979: Star Trek: The Motion Picture brought the much loved television series to the big screen for the first time. Alien upped the ante on how scary a screen monster could be. In 1979, Time After Time pitted H. G. Wells against Jack the Ripper, with a screenplay by Nicholas Meyer, who would later go on to direct two of the installments in the Star Trek film series. The year 1979 also saw Walt Disney Productions' venture into the science fiction genre with The Black Hole, which was poorly received but praised highly for its special effects.

== 1980s ==
Following the huge success of Star Wars, science fiction became bankable again and each major studio rushed into production their available projects. As a direct result, the Star Trek Television series was reborn as a film franchise that continued through the 1980s and 1990s.

Thanks to the Star Wars 1977 and Star Trek 1979 franchises, escapism became the dominant form of science fiction film through the 1980s. The big budget adaptations of Frank Herbert's Dune 1984 and Arthur C. Clarke's sequel to 2001, 2010 in 1984, were box office duds that dissuaded producers from investing in science fiction literary properties.

Ridley Scott's Alien 1979 was significant in establishing a new visual styling of the future. Far from presenting a sleek, ordered universe, this alternative presented the future as dark, dirty and chaotic. Building on earlier films such as "Mad Max" 1979 this Dystopian vision became prevalent in many science fiction films and novels of the period. These included "The Black Hole" 1979, "Saturn 3" 1980, "Outland" 1981, "2010" 1984, "Enemy Mine" 1985, "Aliens (film)" 1986 through its sequels, and Scott's Blade Runner 1982.

The strongest contributors to the genre during the second half of the decade were James Cameron and Paul Verhoeven with The Terminator 1984 and RoboCop 1987 entries.

Steven Spielberg's E.T. the Extra-Terrestrial 1982 became one of the most successful films of the 1980s. An influential film release was Scanners (1981), a film that would be imitated several times over the next two decades.

From 1980, the distinction between science fiction, fantasy, and superhero films blurred, thanks in large part to the influence of Star Wars 1977. From 1980 on, every year saw at least one major science fiction or fantasy film, which critics disparaged and were ignored on Oscar night, except in the technical categories. Disney's 1982 film Tron had a unique visual style, being one of the first major studio films to use extensive computer graphics.

The 1980s and later saw the growth of animation as a medium for science fiction films. This was particularly successful in Japan where the anime industry produced Akira (1988) and Ghost in the Shell (1995). Serious animation has not yet proven commercially successful in the United States and Western-made animated science fiction films such as Light Years (1988), The Iron Giant (1999) and Titan A.E. (2000) did not draw a significant viewing audience. However, anime has gradually gained a cult following and, from the mid-1990s, its popularity has been steadily expanding worldwide.

== 1990s ==
The emergence of the World Wide Web and the cyberpunk genre during the 1990s spawned several Internet-themed films. Both The Lawnmower Man (1992) and Virtuosity (1995) dealt with threats to the network from a human-computer interface. Johnny Mnemonic (1995) and Total Recall (1990) had the memories of their main actors modified by a similar interface, and The Matrix (1999) created a machine-run virtual prison for humanity. The internet also provided a ready medium for film fandom, who could more directly support (or criticize) such media franchise film series as Star Trek and Star Wars.

Disaster film remained popular, with themes updated to reflect recent influences. Both Armageddon (1998) and Deep Impact (1998) used the threat of a massive impact with the earth. Independence Day (1996 in film) recycled the 1950s alien invasion films, with rapacious, all-consuming aliens. Advances in genetic science were also featured in the Jurassic Park (1993) and Gattaca (1997).

As the decade progressed, computers played an increasingly important role in both the addition of special effects and the production of films. Large render farms made of many computers in a cluster were used to detail the images based on three-dimensional models. As the software developed in sophistication it was used to produce more complicated effects such as wave movement, explosions, and even fur-covered aliens. The improvements in special effects allowed the original Star Wars trilogy to be re-released in 1997 with many enhancements.

As in the 1980s, in every year of the 1990s one or more major science fiction or fantasy films were produced.

== 2000s ==
Oddly, in the 2000s (decade), SF films seemed to turn away from space travel, and fantasy predominated. Except for Star Trek and Star Wars films, the only films set off Earth that appeared in the first half of the 2000s (decade) were Serenity, Titan A.E., and the poorly received Mission to Mars and Red Planet. On the other hand, fantasy and superhero films abounded, as did earthbound SF such as The Matrix Reloaded and The Matrix Revolutions.

Science fiction has returned to being a tool for political commentary in recent times with films like A.I. Artificial Intelligence and Minority Report with the former questioning the increasing materialism of today's world and the latter questioning the political situations surrounding the world post 9/11. Unique entries into the genre were also released around this time with the first science fiction romance Eternal Sunshine of the Spotless Mind.

By the middle of the decade, the theater audience had begun to decline and this was reflected in the numbers attending the science fiction movie releases of this period. Sophisticated home theater systems came close to matching the cinema experience, and avoided the expense and inconvenience. Film studios had begun placing product advertisements prior to the start of films in theatres, seeking another means to enhance their bottom line, and alienating a segment of the theater-going audience. Making up for the losses in cinema revenue were sales and rentals of the high-quality DVD releases, many of which included previously cut scenes and extra material.

== 2010s ==
Using bookable actors, science fiction films increasingly entered mainstream cinema with films like Gravity (2013) and Inception (2010) . Science fiction comedies saw moderate success, such as Men in Black 3 (2012), Hot Tub Time Machine (2010) and the sequel Hot Tub Time Machine 2 (2015), including family oriented films such as Megamind (2010) and the four films of the Despicable Me franchise.

Decades-old franchises faced difficulties as original actors aged. Technological solutions such as virtual actors and unreleased footage allowed familiar characters to appear in new films, with examples including Tron: Legacy, Blade Runner 2049 and the continuations of the Star Wars series after the sale of Lucasfilm to Disney. In the case of the latter series, all four new films released in the Star Wars universe during the decade became among the 20 highest grossing films of all time.

Franchise filmmaking dominated across genres in the 2010s, with science fiction reflected in continuing series such as Star Trek, following a 2009 cinematic reboot, Ghostbusters, The Terminator and new entries in the Planet of the Apes series. Other successful science fiction series included those created during a trend for adapting dystopian young adult fiction, including The Hunger Games, Divergent and The Maze Runner. Meanwhile, the continuing success of the Marvel Cinematic Universe explored spacefaring superheroes such as the Guardians of the Galaxy.

== See also ==
- History of science fiction
- History of anime
- History of film
- History of horror films
- Lists of science fiction films
  - List of science fiction films of the 2000s
  - List of science fiction films of the 2010s
  - List of science fiction films of the 2020s
- List of science fiction television films
