= Shintoho =

Former Japanese film studio

Shintoho Co. Ltd. (新東宝株式会社, Shintōhō kabushiki kaisha; or New Tōhō Company) was a Japanese movie studio. It was one of the big six film studios (which also included Daiei, Nikkatsu, Shochiku, Toei Company, and Toho) during the Golden Age of Japanese cinema. It was founded by defectors from the original Toho company following a bitter strike in 1947.

To compete with the other major studios in the horror/supernatural movie field, Shintoho turned out a large group of such films between 1957 and 1960, including a number of period ghost movies and low-budget science fiction films (such as the Starman (Super Giant) series which was designed to compete with rival then-popular characters Planet Prince, Space Chief and Moonlight Mask). Shintoho declared bankruptcy in 1961, its last production being Jigoku.

== Shintoho Starlet Program ==
Like the other major Japanese movie companies at that time, Shintoho was also recruiting so-called new faces under the name of "Shintoho Starlet". Recruitment started in 1951. However, due to the early bankruptcy of Shintoho, the materials have been scattered, and there are many unclear points in the information on successful applicants. One of the successful applicants was the future kickboxing sports-legend Tadashi Sawamura, who acted under pseudonym "Tetsuya Shiro".

== Partial list of Shintoho's films ==
- Nozomi nakini arazu (1949)
- Ikoku no oka (1949)
- Nagarehoshi (1949)
- Yu no machi ereji (1949)
- Shin Tokyo ondo-Bikuri goningumi (1949)
- Design of a Human Being
- Shinya no kokuhaku (1949)
- Guudo bai (1949)
- Enoken - Okochi no Tabisugata ninki otoko
- Zenigata Heiji torimonocho hikae-Heiji hapyakuyacho (1949)
- Ginza kankan musume (1949)
- Nabejima kaineko den (1949)
- Otoko no namida (1949)
- Daitokai no kao (1949)
- Umon torimonocho-Nazo no hachiju hachiya (1949)
- Tobisuke's Adventures (1949)
- Hateshinaki jonetsu (1949)
- Wasurerareta kora (1949)
- Akireta museme tachi (1949)
- Stray Dog (1949)
- Enoken - Kasaoki no Gokuraku fufu (1949)
- Ohara Shosuke-san (1949)
- Damoi (1949)
- Jinsei senshu (1949)
- Rinchi (1949)
- Kage wo shitaite (1949)
- Enoken - Kasaoki no Osomehisamatsu (1949)
- Shojoho (1950)
- Aktsuki no daso (1950) (translation: Escape at Dawn)
- Tokyo Kachinka musume (1950)
- Ishinaka sensei gyojyoki (1950)
- Tsuma to onna kisha (1950)
- Enoken no sokonuke daihoso (1950)
- Umi no G-Men-Genkainada no musume (1950)
- Muko sangen ryodonari-Koi no sanmoneko (1950)
- Fearful Attack of the Flying Saucers (1956)
- The Depths (1957) a.k.a. Kaidan Kasane-ga-fuchi (Ghost Story of Kasane Swamp)
- Seven Mysteries (1957) a.k.a. Ghost Story of Wanderer at Honjo (Kaidan Honjo Nanfushigi)
- Starman: Atomic Rulers of the World (1957)
- Starman: Invaders from Space (1957)
- Starman: Attack from Space (1957)
- Starman: Evil Brain from Outer Space (1958-1959)
- Black Cat Mansion (1958) a.k.a. Borei Kaibyo Yashiki
- Ghost of Chibusa Enoki (1958) a.k.a. Kaidan chibusa enoki, a.k.a. The Mother Tree
- The Ghost of Yotsuya (1959) a.k.a. Tokaido Yotsuya kaidan
- Woman Vampire (Onna kyuketsuki) (1959) a.k.a. Lady Vampire
- Girl Diver of Spook Mansion (1959) a.k.a. The Haunted Cave
- Blood Sword of the 99th Virgin (1959)
- Ghost of Kagami-ga-fuchi (1959) a.k.a. Kaidan Kagami-ga-fuchi
- Ghost of the Girl Diver (1960) a.k.a. Kaidan ama yurei
- Ghost Cat of Otama Pond (1960) a.k.a. Kaibyo Otama-ga-Ike
- Sennin Buraku (1960)
- Jigoku (1960) a.k.a. Sinners of Hell; released as "adults only"

== See also ==
- Toho
- Tsuburaya Productions
- Daiei Film
- Kadokawa Daiei Studio
- Nikkatsu
- Shochiku
- Toei Company
