= Ghost of Chibusa Enoki =

- Directed by: Goro Katano; Hiromichi Takebe (assistant director)
- Written by: Enchō San'yuutei (novel)
- Produced by: Shintoho; Mitsugu Okura (producer)
- Release date: July 13, 1958
- Running time: 47 minutes
- Country: Japan
- Language: Japanese

Ghost of Chibusa Enoki (怪談乳房榎, Kaidan chibusa enoki), aka The Mother Tree, is a 1958 black-and-white, full screen Japanese film directed by Goro Katano. The film, a good example of the Japanese horror genre, was not dubbed in English nor shown theatrically in the United States.

== Synopsis ==
A painter leaves his family to paint the homes of his rich clients. A lonely, ruthless samurai falls in love with the painter's wife and rapes her. He later murders the painter and his servants. From the afterlife, the painter's ghost seeks revenge on the samurai, and saves his wife and newborn child.

== Cast ==
- Asao Matsumoto
- Katsuko Wakasugi
- Keiko Hasegawa
- Akira Nakamura
