= Black Cat Mansion =

1958 Japanese horror film

- Theatrical release poster
- Directed by: Nobuo Nakagawa
- Screenplay by: Jiro Fujishima; Yoshihiro Ishikawa
- Produced by: Mitsugu Okura
- Starring: Toshio Hosokawa; Midori Chikuma; Fuji Satsuki; Shin Shibata
- Cinematography: Nishimoto Tadashi
- Edited by: Toshio Goto
- Music by: Chumei Watanabe
- Production company: Shintoho
- Release date: 13 July 1958 (Japan)
- Running time: 69 minutes
- Country: Japan
- Language: Japanese

Black Cat Mansion (Japanese: 亡霊怪猫屋敷, Hepburn: Bōrei kaibyō yashiki; lit. Mansion of the Ghost Cat) is a 1958 Japanese supernatural horror film directed by Nobuo Nakagawa for Shintoho. The film is presented in a nonlinear narrative, taking place in the characters' present and past (which are filmed in blue-tinted black-and-white), and in the distant past (filmed in color). It is one of several Japanese "ghost cat" films (kaibyō eiga), featuring a cat-like supernatural entity.

Black Cat Mansion was released in Japan in 1958. It was not dubbed in English, nor was it shown theatrically in the United States.

== Plot ==
In a hospital during a power outage, Dr. Tetsuichiro Kuzumi recalls past events. In a flashback, he is shown moving with his wife Yoriko from the city of Tokyo to a house in Kyushu, in order to help cure her tuberculosis. They are accompanied by her elder brother Kenichi. On the way there, their driver sees a black cat cross the road, and nearly crashes the car over a railing and into the sea. They arrive at the centuries-old mansion, where Yoriko is apprehensive at the sight of a cat, a group of crows, and a bloodstained wall. She also sees an eerie old woman who disappears before the others can see her.

Tetsuichiro converts part of the house into a clinic. The old woman arrives to the clinic, startling Tetsuichiro's assistant and prompting his dog Taro to bark. As the assistant goes to fetch Tetsuichiro, the old woman vanishes from the clinic and proceeds to choke Yoriko, though she does not kill her. Later, the woman reappears and tells Tetsuichiro that a family has a sick child, so he departs on a rickshaw, only to find upon arriving at his destination that the family did not send for him. In his absence, the old woman kills Taro and imitates Tetsuichiro's voice, convincing Yoriko to let her in, where she is strangled again. Yoriko later informs Tetsuichiro about her dreams of cats biting her. Tetsuichiro and Kenichi visit a Buddhist temple, where a priest recounts the history of the mansion.

In a flashback to the Sengoku period (c. 1467–1600), it is revealed that the house was once known as Spiraea Mansion, and was overseen by Lord Ishido Sakon no Shogen, who was infamous for his short temper. One day, when the samurai Kokingo is instructed to teach him how to play Go, Kokingo accuses him of cheating, and Shogen murders him with a sword. Lady Miyaji, Kokingo's blind mother, is told that Kokingo suddenly left to study after losing the game. Shogen and his assistant Saheiji dispose of Kokingo's body in a wall, behind a picture. The ghost of Kokingo appears to Miyaji and informs her that he was murdered by Shogen. At dinner, Miyaji tries to stab Shogen, but she fails and he sexually assaults her. Afterwards, she tells her cat Tama to avenge her and Kokingo, and commits suicide. Tama laps up her blood, and Miyaji's ghost curses Shogen's lineage.

Shogen's son Shinnojo wishes to marry a servant named Yae, but she is of a lower station. Shinnojo asks his father for his blessing, but he does not approve. Despite this, Shogen calls for Yae to massage his back, and attempts to assault her. Shinnojo catches him, and Shogen is startled by apparitions of Kokingo and Miyaji. The bakeneko kills Shogen's mother and takes her appearance. She kills a servant named Sato, and both Shogen and Shinnoji perish in a sword fight. Back in the 20th century, the priest reveals that Saheiji is an ancestor of Yoriko, and gives Tetsuichiro a charm to ward off evil spirits. During a storm that night, the wind blows away the charms. When Tetsuichiro goes to close the shutters, the old woman appears and chokes Yoriko. The wall in Yoriko's room crumbles, revealing the mummified skeleton of Kokingo. In the hospital in the present day, it is explained that Yoriko and Tetsuichiro buried the skeleton properly. Yoriko finds a small cat and happily adopts it.

== Cast ==
- Toshio Hosokawa as Dr. Tetsuichiro Kuzumi
- Yuriko Ejima as Yoriko Kuzumi
- Takashi Wada as Lord Shogen
- Ryūzaburō Nakamura as Kokingo
- Fumiko Miyata as Lady Miyaji
- Arata Shibata as Shinnojo
- Noriko Kitazawa as Yae
- Hiroaki Kurahashi as Kenichi
- Fujie Satsuki as Shogen's mother
- Rei Ishikawa as Saheiji

== Release ==
Black Cat Mansion was released in Japan in 1958.

== Critical reception ==
Steve Biodrowski of Cinefantastique Online wrote that the film "is not a masterpiece that will sway the uninitiated", but that it is an "atmospheric and well-executed genre piece". Scott Foutz of Sarudama.com called the film a "tragic ghost story", highly recommending it to fans of J-horror.

== Home media ==
The film was released on DVD in Region 2.
