= Ken Utsui =

Japanese actor

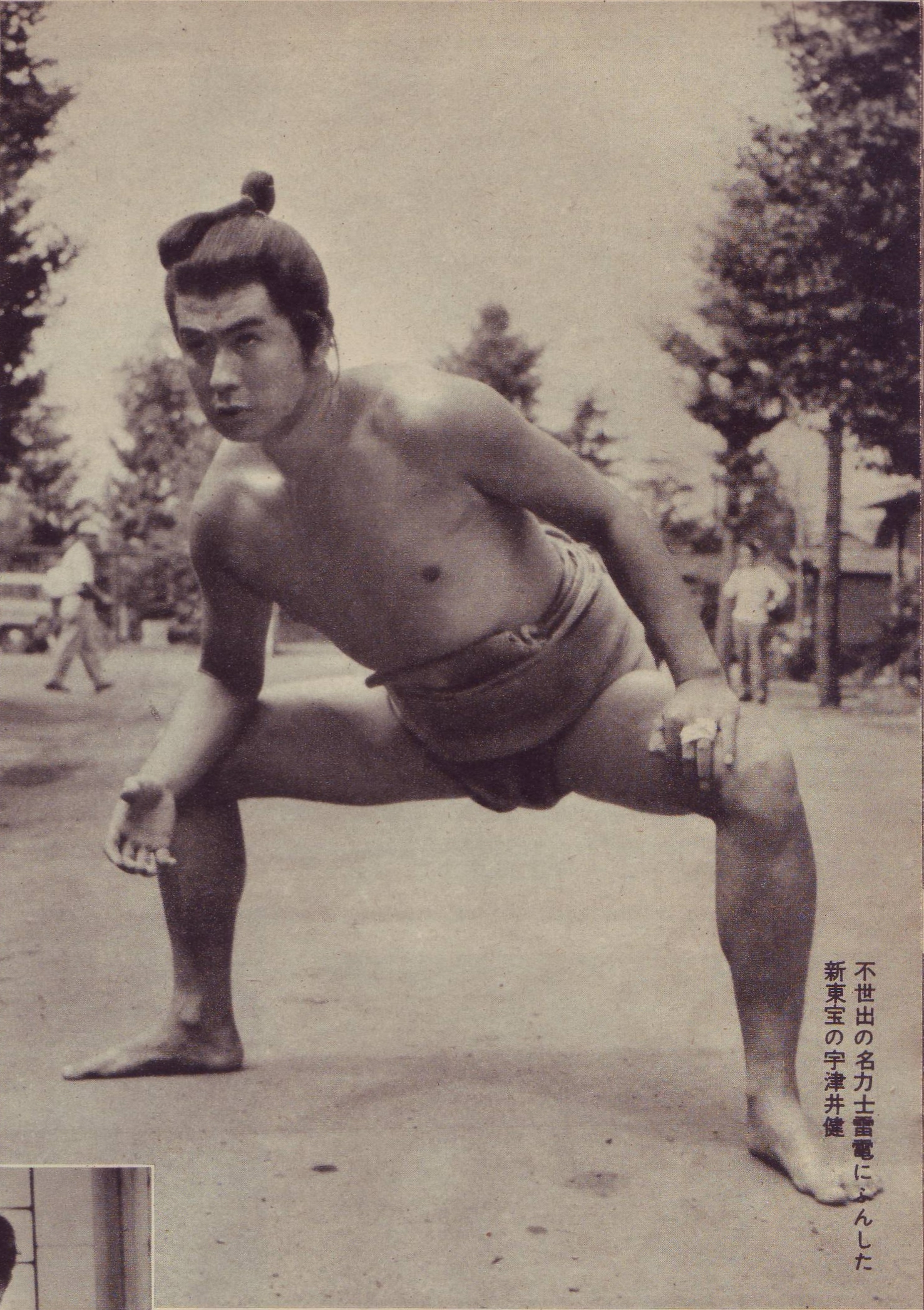
- Utsui as a sumo wrestler for the film Raiden (1959)
- Born: 24 October 1931; Tokyo, Japan
- Died: 14 March 2014 (aged 82)
- Occupation: Actor
- Years active: 1952–2014

Ken Utsui (宇津井健, Utsui Ken) (24 October 1931 – 14 March 2014) was a Japanese actor who worked on stage, film, and television from the 1950s to the 2010s.

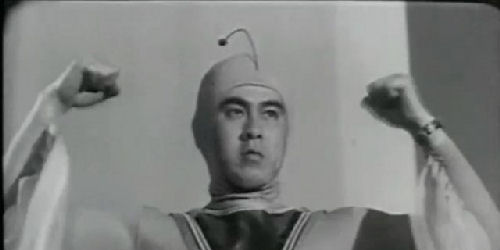
Utsui as Super Giant

== Career and death ==
Born in Tokyo, Utsui entered the Haiyūza theatre troupe in 1952 and was soon selected to star in the film Seishun no izumi that was produced by Haiyūza. In 1954, he signed a contract with Shintoho and starred in 60 films, including the Super Giant series. He moved to Daiei Film in 1963 and starred in another 52 films.

From the mid-1960s, he also began to work on television, starring in many television dramas, especially detective series like The Guardman and Sasurai keiji junjōhen and some installments of the Akai series with Momoe Yamaguchi. He died on 14 March 2014, from natural causes at the age of 82.

== Selected filmography ==
=== Film ===
- Ningen gyorai kaiten (人間魚雷回天 Ningen gyorai kaiten) (1955)
- Revenge of the Pearl Queen (1956)
- Senun Ajia no joo (戦雲アジアの女王) (1957)
- Evil Brain from Outer Space (1964)
- Attack from Space (1964)
- Invaders from Space (1964)
- Atomic Rulers of the World (1964)
- Giant Horde Beast Nezura (1964)
- The Bullet Train (1975)
- Saimin (催眠) (1999)
- Blooming Again (2004)
- Gokusen - The Movie (2009) (Ryuichiro Kuroda)

=== Television ===
- Akai Meiro (1974) – Masato Yuki
- Akai Unmei (1976) – Nobuto Yoshino
- Akai Shisen (1980) – carjack victim and pilot
- Takeda Shingen (1988) – Naoe Kagetsuna
- Onna tachi no Hyakuman goku (1988) – Maeda Toshiie
- Wandering Detective Journey (1988-1995) - Captain Takasugi - Railway Police Department Marunouchi Branch Police Station
- Nobunaga (1991) – Hayashi Michikatsu
- Aoi (2000) – Mōri Terumoto
- Gokusen (2002–2005) – Ryuichiro Kuroda
- Wataru Seken wa Oni Bakari (2006-13) - Daikichi Okakura
- Tenchijin (2009) – Maeda Toshiie
