= Super Giant =

- Super Giant character
- The theatrical release poster for Super Giant (1957).
- First appearance: Super Giant
- Last appearance: Super Giant Continues: The Poison Moth Kingdom
- Created by: Ichiro Miyagawa
- Portrayed by: Ken Utsui

In-universe information
- Nickname: Starman
- Species: Alien-made Steel humanoid
- Gender: Male

Super Giant (スーパージャイアンツ, Sūpā Jaiantsu; literally translated as "Super Giants") is a Japanese superhero featured in a successful series of serial-like tokusatsu short feature films produced between 1957 and 1959 by Shintoho, the non-union branch of Toho. He is also known in Japan as Giant of Steel (鋼鉄の巨人, Kōtetsu no Kyojin); in the U. S. as Starman; in France and Italy as Spaceman.

== Japan's first onscreen superhero ==
Whereas Takeo Nagamatsu's 1930 kamishibai The Golden Bat (Ōgon Batto) was Japan's first modern superhero, and had many manga, anime and film adaptations, Shintoho's Super Giant was the first celluloid superhero, theatrically released in 1957, and the role model for many Japanese superheroes to come, especially Ultraman and Kamen Rider.

Named "Super Giants" (plural), although the main character was only one person and obviously human-sized, the series' title was no doubt inspired by the American Adventures of Superman, which was then being broadcast in Japan, and the famous Japanese baseball team, the Yomiuri Giants, who were extremely popular at the time.

Moonlight Mask (Gekkō Kamen) became Japan's first made-for-television superhero when his TV show debuted in 1958, but Super Giant was Japan's first theatrical superhero series.

== Character background ==
Super Giant is a human-like being created from the strongest steel by the Peace Council of the Emerald Planet. He is created to destroy evil and restore peace in the universe. Resembling a Japanese man in white tights/cowl, fitted with an antenna, and capes under his arms, he is virtually indestructible. He wears on his wrist a "Globe-Meter" device, which enables him to:

- Fly through space
- Detect radiation
- Speak and understand any language

He can also use it to disguise himself as an Earthling in human clothing, to walk among them. When sent to Earth to fight evildoers, he disguises himself as a Japanese man wearing an ordinary suit and fedora hat, looking almost like a police detective, but still uses his "Super Giant" name. His secret identity is not that secret, as he works with the Japanese authorities to help them fight evildoers.

He is just as powerful in his civilian form. He gets along with Earth children, and saves them from danger, as he knows that children represent the Earth's future. After accomplishing his mission, Super Giant always flies all the way back to the Emerald Planet at the end of each episode.

Super Giant was played in all nine films by respected film/TV actor Ken Utsui. However, Utsui hated playing Super Giant and, right up to his death, always played down the role. This was partially on account of the somewhat embarrassing costume, especially the overstuffed crotch area. He said the producers thought that female viewers were attracted to well-endowed men, so they stuffed the crotch area of Utsui's costume with cotton. Whatever Utsui's feelings about the role, his earnest and heroic interpretation of the character made lasting impact on a generation's children all over the world.

== Films ==
=== Super Giant ===
Super Giant
- Theatrical release poster
- Directed by: Teruo Ishii
- Written by: Ichiro Miyagawa
- Produced by: Shintoho
- Music by: Michiaki Watanabe
- Release date: July 30, 1957
- Running time: 49 minutes
- Country: Japan
- Language: Japanese

Super Giant (スーパー・ジャイアンツ 鋼鉄の巨人, Sūpā Jaiantsu) a.k.a. The Steel Giant, is a 1957 black and white Japanese film directed by Teruo Ishii.

Plot: Super Giant first appears on Earth to stop foreign terrorists who threaten to destroy Japan and the rest of the world with an atomic bomb. (Part 1 of 2).

This film is part of the U.S. version Atomic Rulers of the World.

Actors in the film include:

- Ken Utsui as Super Giant
- Junko Ikeuchi
- Minoru Takada
- Ryo Iwashita
- Minako Yamada
- Utako Mitsuya as Kaoru
- Shōji Nakayama
- Jōji Ōhara

=== Super Giant 2 ===
Super Giant 2
- Theatrical release poster
- Directed by: Teruo Ishii
- Written by: Ichiro Miyagawa
- Produced by: Shintoho
- Music by: Michiaki Watanabe
- Release date: August 13, 1957
- Running time: 52 minutes
- Country: Japan
- Language: Japanese

Super Giant Continues (続スーパー・ジャイアンツ 続鋼鉄の巨人, Zoku Sūpā Jaiantsu) is a 1957 black and white Japanese film directed by Teruo Ishii.

Plot: Super Giant continues his battle against the foreign terrorists. In return, they frame him for murder. (Part 2 of 2)

This film is part of the U.S. version Atomic Rulers of the World.

Cast:

- Ken Utsui as Super Giant
- Utako Mitsuya as Kaoru Yamanaka
- Shoji Nakayama as Detective Okamoto
- Junko Ikeuchi as Toshiko
- Takashi Yamaguchi as Minister of Justice

=== Super Giant 3 ===
Super Giant 3
- Directed by: Teruo Ishii
- Written by: Ichiro Miyagawa
- Produced by: Shintoho
- Music by: Michiaki Watanabe
- Release date: October 1, 1957
- Running time: 48 minutes
- Country: Japan
- Language: Japanese

Super Giant - The Mysterious Spacemen's Demonic Castle (スーパー・ジャイアンツ 怪星人の魔城 - Sūpā Jaiantsu - Kaiseijin no Majō) is a 1957 black and white Japanese film directed by Teruo Ishii.

Plot: The reptile-like Kapia-Seijin prepare to conquer the Earth, and Super Giant must stop them. (Part 1 of 2).

This film is part of the U.S. version Invaders from Space.

Cast:

- Ken Utsui as Super Giant
- Masao Takamatsu
- Akira Nakamura
- Hiroshi Asami
- Kotaro Sugiyama
- Fujie Satsuki
- Ryuji Shima
- Yukio Obama
- Yukio Sayama
- Hiroshi Maki
- Daijiro Kikukawa
- Toru Chiba
- Shinji Suzuki

Trivia: The Kapia-Seijin are based on the Japanese mythical creatures known as kappa (water imps).

=== Super Giant 4 ===
Super Giant 4
- Directed by: Teruo Ishii
- Written by: Ichiro Miyagawa
- Produced by: Shintoho
- Music by: Michiaki Watanabe
- Release date: October 8, 1957
- Running time: 39 minutes
- Country: Japan
- Language: Japanese

Super Giant - Earth on the Verge of Destruction (スーパー・ジャイアンツ 地球滅亡寸前 - Sūpā Jaiantsu - Chikyū Metsubō Sunzen) is a 1957 black and white Japanese film directed by Teruo Ishii.

Plot: Super Giant continues his battle against the Kapia-Seijin, who send a mysterious witch after a group of children, and summon their almighty leader to alter Earth's rotation. (Part 2 of 2).

This film is part of the U.S. version Invaders from Space.

=== Super Giant 5 ===
Super Giant 5
- Directed by: Teruo Ishii
- Written by: Ichiro Miyagawa
- Produced by: Shintoho
- Music by: Riichiro Manabe
- Release date: December 28, 1957
- Running time: 39 minutes
- Country: Japan
- Language: Japanese

Super Giant - The Artificial Satellite and the Destruction of Humanity (スーパー・ジャイアンツ 人工衛星と人類の破滅 - Sūpā Jaiantsu - Jinkō Eisei to Jinrui no Hametsu) is a 1957 Japanese film directed by Teruo Ishii.

Plot: Super Giant pursues a Nazi-like army that operates on a huge satellite in space. The satellite is armed with weapons that could destroy whole cities on Earth from afar. (Part 1 of 2)

This film is part of the U.S. version Attack from Space.

=== Super Giant 6 ===
Super Giant 6
- Directed by: Teruo Ishii
- Written by: Ichiro Miyagawa
- Produced by: Shintoho
- Music by: Riichiro Manabe
- Release date: January 3, 1958
- Running time: 39 minutes
- Country: Japan
- Language: Japanese

Super Giant - The Spaceship and the Clash of the Artificial Satellite (スーパー・ジャイアンツ 宇宙艇と人工衛星の激突 - Sūpā Jaiantsu - Uchūtei to Jinkō Eisei no Gekitotsu) is a 1958 black and white Japanese film directed by Teruo Ishii.

Plot: Although he was believed to be destroyed by the Nazi-like army, Super Giant breaks into the satellite, and a long, riotous battle ensues. (Part 2 of 2)

This film is part of the U.S. version Attack from Space.

Trivia: It was after this film was made that director Teruo Ishii left the series, upon hearing of a child who imitated Super Giant, even wearing a hand-made cape, by jumping out of a window and landing on the street below, seriously injuring himself. This became a controversial liability issue with Japanese superhero programs, not unlike those in America, until shows like Android Kikaider (1972) added a safety bumper at the end of each episode, telling children not to imitate the impossible feats performed by the title superhero.

This was the last Super Giant film with a two-part story arc. The remaining films were stand-alone episodes, and none of them from this point on were directed by Teruo Ishii.

=== Super Giant 7 ===
Super Giant 7
- Directed by: Akira Mitsuwa
- Written by: Akira Mitsuwa; Ichiro Miyagawa
- Produced by: Shintoho
- Music by: Ko Ishimatsu
- Release date: April 29, 1958
- Running time: 45 minutes
- Country: Japan
- Language: Japanese

Super Giant - The Space Mutant Appears (スーパー・ジャイアンツ 宇宙怪人出現 - Sūpā Jaiantsu - Uchū Kaijin Shutsugen) is a 1958 black and white Japanese film directed by Akira Mitsuwa.

Plot: Super Giant battles a marauding alien brain-like creature created by a mad scientist and an alien army. (stand-alone episode)

This film is part of the U.S. version Evil Brain from Outer Space.

Cast:

- Ken Utsui as Super Giant
- Akira Nakamura as Dr. Sakurai
- Tomohiko Otani as Dr. Kurokawa
- Hiroshi Asami as Minoru Kawada
- Den Kunikata as Detective Okamoto
- Hiroshi Maki as Policeman A
- Kyoji Murayama as Policeman B
- Masao Takamatsu as Yamanaka, Prime Minister
- Yoshijuro Suzuki as Satomi, Minister of Justice
- Hiroshi Maki as Space Mutant A
- Ryuji Shima as Space Mutant B

Trivia: The last Super Giant film shot in fullscreen.

=== Super Giant 8 ===
Super Giant 8
- Directed by: Chogi Akasaka
- Written by: Ichiro Miyagawa
- Produced by: Shintoho
- Music by: Sadao Nagase
- Release date: March 27, 1959
- Running time: 57 minutes
- Country: Japan
- Language: Japanese

Super Giant Continues - The Devil's Incarnation (続スーパー・ジャイアンツ 悪魔の化身 - Zoku Sūpā Jaiantsu - Akuma no Keshin) is a 1959 Color/Scope Japanese film directed by Chogi Akasaka.

Plot: Super Giant copes with a mad scientist, disfigured in World War II, who uses science and sorcery to turn his deceased daughter into an evil witch that murders women. (stand-alone episode)

This film is part of the U.S. version Evil Brain from Outer Space. Despite the fact it was filmed in color and Scope, footage from this episode was converted to black and white for its incorporation into the English-language film. Evil Brain from Outer Space contains sequences featuring the disfigured scientist and the witch creature. To fit within the US versions story arc, the witch is described as another "mutant".

Trivia: The only Super Giant film made in both color and widescreen (2.35:1).

=== Super Giant 9 ===
Super Giant 9
- Directed by: Chogi Akasaka
- Written by: Ichiro Miyagawa
- Produced by: Shintoho
- Music by: Sadao Nagase
- Release date: April 24, 1959
- Running time: 57 minutes
- Country: Japan
- Language: Japanese

Super Giant Continues - Kingdom of the Poison Moth (続スーパー・ジャイアンツ 毒蛾王国 - Zoku Sūpā Jaiantsu - Dokuga Ōkoku) is a 1959 black and white widescreen Japanese film directed by Chogi Akasaka.

Plot: Super Giant fights against an Arab terrorist army, who wear costumes that look similar to the aliens' costumes in The Space Mutant Appears, which plots to assassinate its nation's peaceful crown prince for his treasure. (stand-alone episode)

This film is part of the U.S. version Evil Brain from Outer Space.

== Manga adaptations ==
Towards the end of the film series' run, there were manga adaptations of the Super Giant adventures. Artists included Tatsuo Yoshida and Jiro Kuwata.

== American adaptations ==
In 1964, the American company Walter Manley Enterprises purchased the international rights to Super Giant and with Medallion Films, repackaged the nine films into four films for U.S. television under the name Starman. They were shown on television in the 1960s.

The first six installments were re-edited into three films -- Atomic Rulers of the World, Invaders from Space, and Attack from Space. The final three Japanese films were all re-edited into Evil Brain from Outer Space. The English dubbing was handled by Titra Studios of New York, using many of the voices common in dubbed films of the time, including Peter Fernandez. The original music soundtrack was largely replaced by library tracks.

== Sources ==
- Ragone, August. THE ORIGINAL "STARMAN"; the Forgotten Supergiant of Steel Who Fought for Peace, Justice and the Japanese Way. Originally published in Planet X Magazine, included as extras (DVD written articles) on both volumes of Something Weird Video's two-volume DVD release of the four American versions of Starman (the first half was on Volume 1 and the second half on Volume 2).
