= List of science fiction films =

This is a list of science fiction films organized chronologically. These films have been released to a cinema audience by the commercial film industry and are widely distributed with reviews by reputable critics. (The exception are the films on the made-for-TV list, which are normally not released to a cinema audience.) This includes silent film–era releases, serial films, and feature-length films. All of the films include core elements of science fiction, but can cross into other genres such as drama, mystery, action, horror, fantasy, and comedy.

Among the listed movies are films that have won motion-picture and science fiction awards as well as films that have been listed among the worst movies ever made, or have won one or more Golden Raspberry Awards. Critically distinguished films are indicated by footnotes in the listings.

== Lists by decade ==
- List of science fiction films before 1920
- List of science fiction films of the 1920s
- List of science fiction films of the 1930s
- List of science fiction films of the 1940s
- List of science fiction films of the 1950s
- List of science fiction films of the 1960s
- List of science fiction films of the 1970s
- List of science fiction films of the 1980s
- List of science fiction films of the 1990s
- List of science fiction films of the 2000s
- List of science fiction films of the 2010s
- List of science fiction films of the 2020s

== Other ==
- List of science fiction comedy films
- List of science fiction horror films
- List of science fiction thriller films
- List of science fiction television films

== See also ==
Subgenre lists

- List of films featuring extraterrestrials
- List of films set in the future
- List of time travel films
- List of films featuring space stations
- List of films featuring dinosaurs
- List of space opera films

Related films

- Fantasy films
- Horror films
- Superhero film

Related lists

- List of Sci Fi Pictures original films
- List of science fiction anime
- List of film serials
- List of fantasy films
- Lists of horror films
- List of stories set in a future now in the past
- List of fictional spacecraft
- List of fictional space stations
- Starship (interstellar spacecraft)#Fictional examples

Film ratings

- Hugo Award for Best Dramatic Presentation
- Hugo Award for Best Dramatic Presentation, Long Form
- Saturn Award for Best Science Fiction Film
- List of films considered the best
- List of films considered the worst
