= Attack from Space =

1964 film

- Alpha Video DVD cover art
- Directed by: Teruo Ishii
- Written by: Ichiro Miyagawa
- Based on: Super Giant
- Produced by: Mitsugi Okura
- Starring: Ken Utsui
- Cinematography: Takashi Watanabe
- Music by: Chumei Watanabe
- Production company: Shintoho
- Distributed by: Walter Manley Enterprises Inc.
- Release date: 1965
- Running time: 76 minutes
- Countries: Japan; United States
- Language: English (dubbed)

Attack from Space is a 1965 science fiction compilation film produced for American television. It is the third film, following Atomic Rulers of the World (1 and 2) and Invaders from Space (3 and 4), to be comprised from the six installments of the Japanese short film series Super Giant from Shintoho.

It is available on YouTube as of June 2020

== Plot ==
The superhero Starman, a human-like being created from the strongest steel by the Peace Council of the Emerald Planet, is sent by the leaders of that planet to protect Earth from belligerent aliens from the Sapphire Galaxy.

After avoiding the Sapphireans during his flight to Earth, Starman discovers their plot to destroy Earth, after they blow up a part of the Himalayas .

The Sapphireans kidnap Dr. Yamanaka and his family and force him to use his spaceship against the Earth.

It's up to Starman to save Dr. Yamanaka, his family and the Earth.

== American adaptation ==
The nine Super Giant films were purchased for distribution to U.S. television and were edited into four films and cheaply dubbed by Walter Manley Enterprises for syndication by Medallion Films. The two original Japanese films that composed Attack from Space (The Artificial Satellite and the Destruction of Humanity and The Spaceship and the Clash of the Artificial Satellite) were each 39 minutes in duration. The two films were edited into one 76-minute film, resulting in only two lost minutes in the combined edit, probably consisting mostly of cast and credits. As a result, this compilation suffered least among the Super Giant films in its adaptation for American television, except in terms of cast and credits.

Although Riichiro Manabe composed the music to the original two films, most of the original music was replaced by library tracks in the American adaptation, which were then credited to Chumei Watanabe. Additionally, the screen cast, which was identical to the one used for Atomic Rulers of the World, includes names of performers not appearing in the film, and omits those of some performers who did.

== Production ==
Follows the first two movie compilation of the series, Atomic Rulers of the World and Invaders from Space. This movie compiles episodes #5 and #6 from 1957. The next film in the series is Evil Brain from Outer Space

== Reception ==
This movie was found to be more coherent than most of the compilation, and although the movie lacks the imaginative monsters of the other in the series, Fantastic Musings found the movie to be fun and enjoyed the hero Starman.

== DVD releases ==
Attack from Space is currently available on two DVD releases. Something Weird Video with Image Entertainment released this film and the other compiled Starman film, Evil Brain from Outer Space on a single disc on December 10, 2002. Alpha Video also released a budget-priced disc of the film by itself on March 23, 2004.

== In other media ==
- The film was featured in the second episode of the Ed the Sock series This Movie Sucks! with comedic commentary by Ed, Liana Kerzner and Ron Sparks.
- Some quotes can be heard in the song "The Bomb" on the album This Means War by synthwave artist Volkor X.
- It also fell victim to mockery by RiffTrax, commentated by Michael J. Nelson, Kevin Murphy and Bill Corbett.

== See also ==
- Super Giant

== Sources ==
- Ragone, August. THE ORIGINAL "STARMAN": The Forgotten Supergiant of Steel Who Fought for Peace, Justice and the Japanese Way Originally published in Planet X Magazine, included in Something Weird Video's DVD release.
