= Atomic Rulers of the World =

1965 film

- Alpha Video DVD cover art
- Directed by: Teruo Ishii; Akira Mitsuwa; Koreyoshi Akasaka
- Starring: Ken Utsui; Junko Ikeuchi; Shôji Nakayama
- Production company: Shintoho
- Distributed by: Walter Manley Enterprises Inc.
- Release date: 10 April 1965
- Running time: 83 minutes (USA)
- Countries: Japan; United States
- Language: English (dubbed)

Atomic Rulers of the World (or just Atomic Rulers) is a 1965 film edited together for American television from films #1 and #2 of the 1957 Japanese short film series Super Giant.

== Plot ==
The story involves the superhero Starman (Super Giant in Japan) who is sent by the Emerald Planet to protect Earth from the nuclear holocaust threatened by the country of Metropol.

== Principal cast ==
- Ken Utsui as Super Giant a.k.a. Starman
- Reiko Seto as Reiko Okamoto
- Shōji Nakayama as Detective Okamoto
- Ryo Iwashita as Masao - Boy with Briefcase
- Noriko Katsuma as Yoshiko - Orphan Girl
- Yukihiko Ōsawa as Hiroshi - Kidnapped Boy
- Junko Ikeuchi as Sister Toshiko - Nun

== Production ==
=== American adaptation ===
The 9 Super Giant films were purchased for distribution to U.S. television and edited into 4 films by Walter Manley Enterprises and Medallion Films. The 2 original Japanese films which went into Atomic Rulers of the World (Super Giant and Super Giant Continues) were 49 minutes and 53 minutes in duration. The two films were edited into one 83-minute film. The original films were two parts of a complete story, but a total of 19 minutes was cut during the re-editing, dropping elements from both films. Also, most of the original music was scrapped and replaced by library cues. The result was a product considerably different from the Japanese originals.

== Release ==
=== Home media ===
Atomic Rulers of the World is currently available on two DVD releases. Something Weird Video with Image Entertainment released the film and another Starman film, Invaders from Space on a single disc on December 10, 2002. Alpha Video also released a budget-priced disc of the film by itself on June 22, 2004.

== See also ==
- Attack from Space
- Evil Brain from Outer Space
- Invaders from Space
- Super Giant

== Sources ==
- Ragone, August. THE ORIGINAL "STARMAN": The Forgotten Supergiant of Steel Who Fought for Peace, Justice and the Japanese Way Originally published in Planet X Magazine, included in Something Weird Video's DVD release.
