= Invaders from Space =

- Opening titles
- Directed by: Teruo Ishii; Akira Mitsuwa; Koreyoshi Akasaka
- Written by: Ichiro Miyagawa
- Produced by: Mitsugi Okura
- Starring: Ken Utsui
- Distributed by: Walter Manley Enterprises Inc.
- Release date: 1965
- Running time: 78 minutes (United States)
- Country: Japan
- Language: English (dubbed)

Invaders from Space is a 1965 film edited together for American television from films #3 and #4 of the 1957 Japanese short film series Super Giant.

== Plot ==
The story involves the superhero Starman who is sent by the Emerald Planet to protect Earth from the Salamander Men of the planet Kulimon in the Moffit galaxy who plan to destroy Earth.

== American adaptation ==
Opening credits showing the copyright date of MCMLXV (1965)

The 9 Super Giant films were purchased for distribution to U.S. television and edited into 4 films by Walter Manley Enterprises and Medallion Films. The 2 original Japanese films which went into Invaders from Space (The Mysterious Spacemen's Demonic Castle and Earth on the Verge of Destruction) were 48 minutes and 39 minutes in duration. The two films were edited into one 78-minute film, resulting in a total of 9 minutes being cut from the two films during the re-editing. Also, most of the original music was replaced by library cues.

== DVD release ==
Invaders from Space is currently available on DVD. Something Weird Video with Image Entertainment released the film and another Starman film, Atomic Rulers of the World on a single disc on December 10, 2002.

== See also ==
- Super Giant
- Atomic Rulers of the World
- Attack from Space
- Evil Brain from Outer Space
