= Evil Brain from Outer Space =

- Alpha Video DVD cover art
- Directed by: Koreyoshi Akasaka; Akira Mitsuwa
- Written by: Akira Mitsuwa; Ichiro Miyagawa
- Produced by: Mitsugi Okura
- Starring: Ken Utsui; Junko Ikeuchi; Minoru Takada
- Distributed by: Walter Manley Enterprises Inc.
- Release date: 1964
- Running time: 78 minutes (U.S.)

Evil Brain from Outer Space is a 1964 film edited together for American television from films #7, #8 and #9 of the 1957/1958 Japanese Super Giant film series.

== Synopsis ==
The film concerns Starman's efforts to save the Earth from the followers of Balazar, an evil genius from the planet Zemar whose prodigiously overdeveloped brain has been preserved after his own assassination.

== American adaptation ==
The nine Super Giant films were purchased for distribution to U.S. television and edited into four films by Walter Manley Enterprises and Medallion Films. The three original Japanese films which went into Evil Brain from Outer Space (The Space Mutant Appears, The Devil's Incarnation and Kingdom of the Poison Moth) were 45 minutes, 57 minutes, and 57 minutes in duration respectively. The total 159 minutes of the three films were edited into one 78-minute film. Since the three original films were self-contained stories, three different plots had to be edited together, and a considerable amount of all three films dropped. The result has been called "an alternately mind-blowing and mind-numbing adventure...a non-ending cavalcade of characters, chases, captures, rescues and fight scenes."

Contributing to the difficulty of editing these three films together was the fact that the first one of the Japanese films was in the older 4:3 ratio, while the latter two films were shot in widescreen format. This would have necessitated the use of pan-and-scan methods to make the three films match. One of the films (The Devil's Incarnation) was also shot in color, so the footage would have had to have been converted to black and white in order to match the other two episodes.

== DVD releases ==
Evil Brain from Outer Space is currently available on two DVD releases. Something Weird Video with Image Entertainment released the film and the other Starman film, Attack from Space on a single disc on December 10, 2002. Alpha Video also released a budget-priced disc of the film by itself on July 27, 2004. The film is also available on two multi-film compilations from Mill Creek Entertainment: Nightmare Worlds and Pure Terror.

== See also ==
- Super Giant
- Atomic Rulers of the World
- Attack from Space
- Invaders from Space

== Trivia ==
- Some quotes like "Time is running out" and "Gentlemen, it's a nuclear device" are sampled in the soundtrack for Command & Conquer: Red Alert 2, in the track "Blow It Up".
