= List of Saving Grace characters =

This is a list of characters from the television series Saving Grace, which premiered in 2007 on TNT in the United States.

== Primary characters ==
- Grace Hanadarko (Holly Hunter): Grace is an Oklahoma City police detective who has a hard-living, hard-loving, hard-drinking lifestyle, and is visited by an angel trying to help her heal from her past.
- Earl (Leon Rippy): the last-chance angel who visits Grace. Earl is a folksy, down-to-earth type who enjoys chewing tobacco and collecting T-shirts from his many global haunts. He usually just appears and makes his presence known to certain select individuals. Occasionally his wings are seen. Other angels notice that Earl has a special feeling for Grace.
- Hamilton "Ham" Dewey (Kenny Johnson): Grace's police partner who is personally and physically involved with her. Ham is a good-hearted guy with very passionate feelings which sometimes get the best of him.
- Rhetta Rodriguez (Laura San Giacomo): Grace's best friend since childhood, and a police forensics specialist. A devout Catholic with the curiosity of a scientist, Rhetta is fascinated by Grace's encounters with Earl.
- Butch Ada (Bailey Chase): a fellow detective in the Major Crimes squad, he has a long history with Grace and has been at odds with Ham over this. From a wealthy family, Butch played football for the Texas Longhorns, and finds himself a very lonely fish in a sea of Oklahoma Sooner fans who consider him a traitor (football-wise) given Oklahoma's traditional rivalry with neighboring Texas.
- Bobby Stillwater (Gregory Norman Cruz): Butch's police partner, Bobby is the steady family man of the group. Bobby is of mixed Native American and Mexican heritage. He kept his diabetes secret from the rest until it became public during a contentious mass deposition by a sleazy lawyer from Los Angeles.
- Captain Kate Perry (Lorraine Toussaint): The supervisor of the Major Crimes squad, replaces Lt. Yukon after he is killed by his brother. Kate Perry once worked the streets with Grace, but she now has to make decisions based on the bigger picture.
- Clay Norman (Dylan Minnette): Clay is the young son of Grace's late sister, Mary Frances. Clay shares a special bond with Grace.
- Leon Cooley (Bokeem Woodbine): Convicted of a murder he didn't commit and on death row for killing a prison guard, Leon was another one of Earl's charges. He bonded with Grace, Father Johnny, and Rhetta, who try unsuccessfully to get his death sentence commuted. Leon's execution was finally carried out at the end of the second season.
- Father John Hanadarko (Tom Irwin): Grace's brother, who is a Catholic priest. John wants Grace to draw closer to God, but is impatient with her behavior and has difficulty believing an angel visits her.
- Neely Lloyd (Yaani King): Neely is a young drug addict who is also watched over by Earl, and beginning in the third season Grace reaches out to her.
- Henry Silver (Mark L. Taylor): Henry works with Rhetta in forensic sciences, specializing in pathology. Single and in his 40s, he still lives with his mother.

== Recurring characters ==
Grace's family

- Leo Hanadarko (Patrick St. Esprit): Grace's firefighter brother, who has the shared experience with Grace of the traumatic search-and-rescue efforts on the day of the Alfred P. Murrah Federal Building bombing.
- Paige (Jessica Tuck): Grace's little sister, Paige deals with life very differently from Grace; she is a perfectionist who clashes with her sister's reckless ways.
- Mary Frances Norman (Caitlin Dulany): Grace's sister Mary Frances lost her life in the Oklahoma City bombing, leaving behind her husband Doug and her son Clay. She died before the timeline of the show began, but has appeared in a dream sequence.
- Doug Norman (Chris Mulkey): Clay's father and the widower of Grace's sister, Mary Frances.
- Betty Hanadarko (Jessica Walter): Grace's mother, Betty Hanadarko loves her daughter but has difficulty honestly facing some of the things that happened to Grace as a child.
- Joe Hanadarko (Sam Hennings): Grace's brother Joe.
- Geepaw (August Schellenberg): Grace's grandfather. Geepaw is a full-blooded Native American, a member of the Choctaw people.
- Cathy (Frances Fisher): Grace's aunt and Betty Hanadarko's sister. A free spirit whom Grace was once close to, a chasm came between them when Grace learned of Cathy's affair with her father.
- Jimmy Hanadarko (Mike Pavone): Grace's brother Jimmy.
- Sayre Hanadarko (Jessy Schram): Leo Hanadarko's daughter and Grace's niece
- Buck (Jake Muxworthy): Paige's husband.

The Dewey family

- Ralph "Rafe" Dewey (Judson Mills): Ham's younger brother, Rafe was a lieutenant in the Marines. He died of his wounds after fighting in the mountains of Afghanistan.
- Amanda Dewey (Ashley Williams): Rafe's widow
- Nick Dewey (Jack Conley): Ham's brother Nick is gay and owns an art gallery in town. He is very protective of Ham.
- Darlene Dewey (Robyn Lively): Ham's wife. They separated and divorced during the second season.

Others

- Ronnie Rodriguez (Jose Zuniga Seasons 1-2/Benito Martinez Season 3): Rhetta's husband Ronnie runs the family farm.
- Benjamin Cooley (Malcolm David Kelley): Leon Cooley's son, Benjamin makes friends with Clay through the Police Explorers program.
- Kendra Burke (Erin Cahill): Butch's fiancee starting in the third season, Kendra is an Oklahoma City TV news reporter.
- Marissa Stillwater (Camillia Sanes): Bobby Stillwater's wife.
- Nell Ada (Andrea Fay Friedman): Butch's sister Nell has Down syndrome.
- Emily Jane Ada (Mariette Hartley): Butch's affluent and well-connected mother.
- Lt. Percy Yukon (Roger Aaron Brown): Lt. Yukon was the original supervisor of Grace's squad, but was shot to death by his brother in the second episode.
- Chet (Art Frankel): Grace's elderly neighbor was often a fixture at his window during the first season, seeing Grace naked on a regular basis.
- Pippa (DeLane Matthews): Pippa is a street-walking prostitute who helps Grace out with tips on investigations.
- Alvin Green (Steve Rankin): A cattle baron who is used to getting what he wants, Alvin Green paws Grace while she's on the job. He winds up with a face full of knuckles and flat on his back for his trouble.
- Brad Gholston (Steven Culp): Brad Gholston is a detective in the Internal Affairs division. Once upon a time Brad worked the streets with Grace, but he wasn't cut out for it. He and Grace now have a very tense relationship.
- Abby Charles (Christina Ricci): Abby works a rotation as Grace's partner under the guise of a young patrol officer. She arrives late on her first day and proves unreliable in other ways. Later it is learned she's from Internal Affairs, sent by Brad Gholston to dig up dirt.
- Maggie (Kathy Baker): Maggie showed up as the new love of Doug Norman's life until Grace discovered Maggie was an ex-con who wanted to cash in on the triple life insurance Doug took out after Mary Frances' death.
- Father Patrick Murphy (René Auberjonois): The family priest when Grace was a child, he was a pedophile who abused scores of children including Grace. He was long thought dead but had actually been sent by the diocese to other locations before being sent to Tulsa. Grace and Rhetta's nickname for him was "Father Satan". Shortly after his presence in Tulsa was discovered, he was confronted by Grace's brother, Johnny, a priest, who slugged Murphy after ascertaining the truth about his abuse of Grace. Murphy was murdered shortly after being released on bail after Grace arrested him for his crimes.
- Hut Flanders (Gordon MacDonald): Hut Flanders appears in the final episodes. An enigmatic stranger who presents himself as a writer documenting tragedy, he turns out to be an agent of evil and harvester of sorrow, someone Grace must deal with in the series finale.
