= Devil May Call =

- Devil May Call Official Poster
- Directed by: Jason Cuadrado
- Written by: Jason Cuadrado; Wyatt Doyle
- Story by: Jason Cuadrado
- Produced by: Camillia Sanes
- Starring: Corri English; Tyler Mane; Traci Lords; Van Hansis; Tracy Perez; Camillia Monet; Daniel Hugh Kelly
- Cinematography: A.J. Raitano
- Edited by: Vicente Perez; Marta Bonet
- Music by: Nicholas Pike
- Production company: Grindstone Entertainment Group
- Release date: 2013
- Running time: 90 minutes
- Country: United States
- Language: English

Devil May Call is a 2013 horror film directed by American filmmaker Jason Cuadrado and written by Cuadrado and Wyatt Doyle. The film stars Corri English as Samantha, a crisis hotline counselor.

== Plot ==
Blind telephone counselor Sam (Corri English) is leaving. Volunteering to train new employee Jess (Van Hansis), Sam joins skeleton crew Val (Traci Lords) and Jules (Tracy Perez) for one last night on the phones. They’re expecting a quiet night. But John (Tyler Mane), a serial killer and one of Sam’s regular callers, is upset at Sam's leaving and feels betrayed. Seeking revenge, John knocks out the power to the building and begins tearing the office to pieces. Terror ensues.

== Cast ==
- Corri English as Sam Carvin
- Tyler Mane as John Reed Smith
- Traci Lords as Valerie "Val" Kramer
- Van Hansis as Jess Gibson
- Traci Perez as Jules Ibanez
- Camillia Monet as Emily Gretsch
- Daniel Hugh Kelly as Tony Taylor
- Carina Aviles as Ana Charvel

== Production ==
Devil May Call was financed by Urs Brunner, the CEO of Boncafe and Angel and Bear Productions. It is his first American production.

Corri English studied with a blind coach to learn the mannerisms of the sight impaired. The production also consulted with crisis hotlines to authenticate the calling process for volunteers and how the centers are managed.

The film was shot in Los Angeles over the course of 12 nights. The office location where most of the action takes place was in a practically abandoned building which helped sell the isolation and general creepiness of the story. A nighttime schedule also allowed the production to work without disturbing the few residents still left in the entire building.

The entire project went from a story by Jason Cuadrado to a completed rough cut in six months. The film was completed and had its domestic premiere at Paramount Studios three months after.

== Distribution ==
North American film rights were acquired by Grindstone Entertainment Group for Lionsgate Home Entertainment.
