= Nicholas Pike =

- Born: Water Orton, Warwickshire, England
- Genres: Film and television score
- Occupation: Music composer
- Website: http://www.nicholaspike.net

Nicholas Pike is an Emmy Award-winning English film and television music composer.

== Early life and education ==
Nicholas Pike was born in Water Orton, Warwickshire, England. He started his music career at the age of 7 at the Canterbury Choir School and subsequently moved to Cape Town, South Africa at the age of 10 where he continued in music becoming Head Chorister at St George's Grammar School, Cathedral choir as well as playing the flute with the Cape Town Symphony Orchestra at the age of 15. He was a member of the rock band Hammak and toured the country with this and other bands. At age 17 he left to study flute and composition in Boston at the Berklee College of Music.

== Career ==
Pike moved to New York City, where he recorded and performed with his band FluteJuice featuring Bill Frisell, Billy Hart, Kenny Werner, and Hank Roberts among many others. He recorded and released the album Waterlilies with Brazilian percussionist Nana Vasconcelos and guitar virtuoso Bill Connors. Before embarking on his film scoring career he conducted and recorded his suite "Master Harold and the Boys" with the London Symphony Orchestra which was based on Athol Fugard's apartheid era play of the same name.

As a film composer, he is known for featuring unique sounds and instrumentation. He has written for projects ranging from Stephen King's The Shining to Disney's Captain Ron as well as animated films such as Disney's The Prince and the Pauper. Awards include the Elmer Bernstein Award for his score to Love Object at the Woodstock Film Festival, the Best Music Award from the Sitges Cinema Fantastic Festival for his score to Critters 2 and the Emmy for original music at the 34th News & Documentary Emmy Awards for the HBO documentary In Tahrir Square about the beginnings of the Arab Spring. He received an ACE Award for the work on Tales From The Crypt.

He composed music for large-scale music videos including Michael Jackson's "Ghost" and "You Rock My World", MC Hammer's "Too Legit to Quit" and "Here Comes The Hammer" and Will Smith's "Wild Wild West". He was chosen by actress/comedian and talk show host Bonnie Hunt to create and lead the first-ever daytime talk show live band for The Bonnie Hunt Show which aired on the NBC network. Pike composed the music for the show. He wrote and produced the song "On Ghost Ridge" for the documentary 100 Years: One Woman's Fight for Justice chronicling the epic battle between Blackfoot Indian Elouise Cobell and the US government. The song was performed by Malaysian pop star Yuna and long-listed for an Academy Award Nomination in the Best Original Song category

Pike arranged, produced, and composed the score for the first episode of Apple TV+'s series Amazing Stories.

In 2023, Pike appeared as a guest at Kingvention, the annual Michael Jackson fan convention held in London.

Pike composed the score and the Oscar Nominated operatic aria Sweet Dreams Of Joy, performed by Ana María Martínez for the documentary Viva Verdi! released in 2025.

== Filmography ==
=== Film ===
Year	Title	Director	Studio(s)	Notes
1987	Graveyard Shift	Jerry Ciccoritti	Cinema Ventures	—N/a
1988	Critters 2: The Main Course	Mick Garris	New Line Cinema	—N/a
1989	C.H.U.D. II: Bud the C.H.U.D.	David K. Irving	Vestron Pictures	—N/a
1990	Mission Manila	Peter Mackenzie	M.C.E.G.	—N/a
1992	Stephen King's Sleepwalkers	Mick Garris	Columbia Pictures	—N/a
1992	Captain Ron	Thom Eberhardt	Touchstone Pictures	—N/a
1994	Blank Check	Rupert Wainwright	Walt Disney Pictures	—N/a
1996	Michael Jackson's Ghosts	Stan Winston	MJJ Productions; Kingdom Entertainment	Direct-to-video film
1997	Star Kid	Manny Coto	Trimark Pictures	—N/a
1997	Telling Lies in America	Guy Ferland	Banner Entertainment	
1998	The Sadness of Sex	Rupert Wainwright	FilmWorks Entertainment	—N/a
1999	Delivered	Guy Ferland	Edie Films	—N/a
2000	Return to Me	Bonnie Hunt	Metro-Goldwyn-Mayer	—N/a
2002	Virginia's Run	Peter Markle	Knightscove Entertainment; Holedigger Films	—N/a
2002	FeardotCom	William Malone	Franchise Pictures; MDP Worldwide	—N/a
2003	Love Object	Robert Parigi	Lolo Film; Visionbox Pictures; Catapult Films; Base 12 Productions	—N/a
2003	The I Inside	Roland Suso Richter	Miramax Films	—N/a
2004	Riding the Bullet	Mick Garris	Innovation Film Group	—N/a
2005	Checking Out	Jeff Hare	FilmWorks Entertainment	—N/a
2005	The L.A. Riot Spectacular	Marc Klasfeld	Image Entertainment	—N/a
2006	Stephen King's Desperation	Mick Garris	Touchstone Television	—N/a
2008	Parasomnia	William Malone	Luminous Processes; Rising Storm Productions	—N/a
2009	It's Alive	Josef Rusnak	Millennium Films	—N/a
2009	Blood and Bone	Ben Ramsey	Cinema Management Group	Direct-to-video film
2009	Wrong Turn at Tahoe	Franck Khalfoun	Paramount Famous Productions	Direct-to-video film
2013	Devil May Call	Jason Cuadrado	Grindstone Entertainment Group	—N/a
2014	Rio 2	Carlos Saldanha	Blue Sky Studios	Orchestrator

=== Television ===
Year	Title	Director	Studio(s)	Notes
1989–1996	Tales from the Crypt	Various	HBO	10 episodes
1997	The Shining	Mick Garris	ABC	TV miniseries
1999–2001	The Lot	Various	American Movie Classics	17 episodes
2005–2007	Masters of Horror	Various	Showtime	6 episodes
2011	Bag of Bones	Mick Garris	A&E	2 episodes

=== Music video ===
Year	Title	Artist	Director	Notes
2001	"You Rock My World"	Michael Jackson	Paul Hunter	Original score
