= Chōchin'obake =

Japanese yōkai

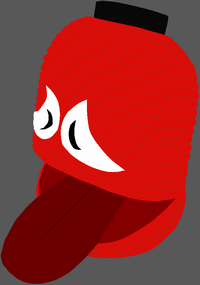
Chōchin'obake

Chōchin'obake (提灯お化け, 'paper lantern ghost') or chōchin-obake is a Japanese yōkai of chōchin (a type of lantern), "[the] lantern-spook (chochinobake) ... a stock character in the pantheon of ghouls and earned mention in the definitive demonology of 1784". They can also be called simply chōchin, bake-chōchin, obake-chōchin, and chōchin-kozō.

They appear in the kusazōshi, omocha-e, and karuta card games like obake karuta starting from the Edo period to the early 20th century (and still in use today), as well as in Meiji and Taishō toys, children's books, and haunted house attractions.

== Description ==
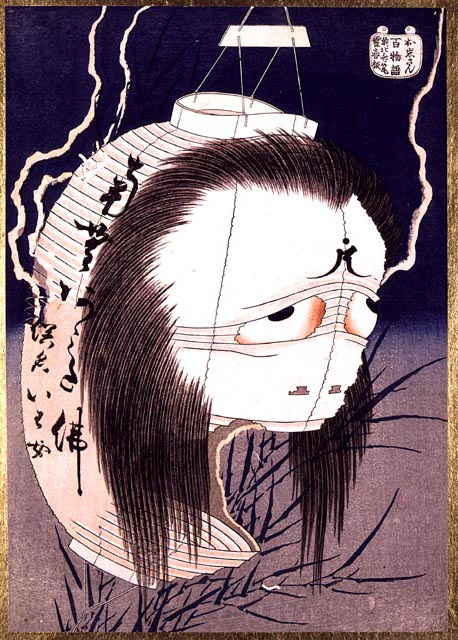
Oiwa-san from the One Hundred Ghost Stories by Katsushika Hokusai

An old chōchin would split upwards and downwards, and the part that got split would become a mouth and stick out a long tongue, and the chōchin obake is commonly considered not to have one eye in its upper half, but two. Sometimes, the chōchin would also grow a face, hands, a torso, and wings.

In pictures from the Edo period, both bucket-shaped and cylindrical chōchin were depicted. In the Gazu Hyakki Tsurezure Bukuro by Sekien Toriyama, a lantern-shaped yōkai under the name of bura-bura was depicted.

They are also known from ukiyo-e such as Katsushika Hokusai's Oiwa-san from the One Hundred Ghost Stories, and Utagawa Kuniyoshi's Kamiya Iemon Oiwa no Bōkon from the Edo period and beyond. These were inspired by the kabuki, the Tōkaidō Yotsuya Kaidan (1825), in which the spirit of Oiwa, who was killed by Kamiya Iemon, was performed displaying itself from a chōchin (which was called chōchin'nuke), and as well as another performance in which a chōchin had a human face, the Kasane ga Fuchi Satemo Sono Nochi (累渕扨其後) (in 1825, at the Nakamura-za among other places), so these were called chōchin'oiwa.

Among emakimono that depict many yōkai of tools, there is the Hyakki Yagyō Emaki, but there have been no chōchin found in older works before the Edo Period. Examples of works after the Edo Period include the 百鬼夜行之図 (Hyakki Yagyō no Zu) by Kanō Jōshin.

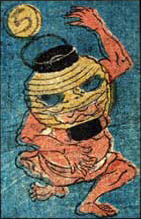
Obake Karuta

The chōchin'obake in particular was created from a chōchin lantern composed of "bamboo and paper or silk". They are portrayed with "one eye, and a long tongue protruding from an open mouth".

== Oral legends ==
Although they are famous yōkai, it is said that there are almost no legends in any area that are about this, so in yōkai-related literature they are classified as "yōkai that exist only in pictures". It is also commonly believed that they were created as a story for entertaining children. The yōkai comic artist Mizuki Shigeru published a story about how a chōchin'obake would surprise people and suck out their souls, but it did not cite any primary sources.

Also, yōkai considered to be chōchin in the legends are often described as atmospheric ghost lights like chōchinbi rather than as the tool itself.

In an old story from the Yamagata Prefecture, at a shrine with an aged chōchin, a chōchin'obake would appear and frighten humans. The obake would no longer appear after the chōchin was put away.

== See also ==
- Burabura - possibly a type of chōchin'obake
- Karakasa
- Obake
- Tsukumogami
- Yōkai
