= Jason Cuadrado =

American film director

- Born: Jason Joseph Cuadrado; New York City, U.S.
- Occupations: Film director, producer, screenwriter
- Years active: 2002–present
- Website: jasoncuadrado.com

Jason Cuadrado is an American film director, producer, and screenwriter, known for directing the first j-horror feature film in the United States, Tales from the Dead. After directing television news in New York City, he transitioned to film by starting as a personal assistant to American actor, John Leguizamo. He wrote and directed the thriller Devil May Call.

== Biography ==
Cuadrado was born in New York City, the son of Juan Jose Cuadrado, a high school teacher and Clementina Tang-Cuadrado, a university professor. He's the second born of three sons and is of Puerto Rican, Colombian, and Chinese descent. He was named after the Greek Jason after nearly being named after Orson Welles.

He is a graduate of Townsend Harris High School and attended Queens College and New York University where he studied video and film production. After directing new segments for Bloomberg Television and heading the new media department for Deloitte and Touche's New York branch, Cuadrado relocated to Los Angeles where he focused on feature film directing, writing, and editing. It was in California where he was inspired by trends in Japanese horror to write and shoot the j-horror anthology film Tales from the Dead. The film features a cast of Japanese actors speaking their native tongue. Many of whom worked together on Letters from Iwo Jima by Clint Eastwood. Cuadrado did not know Japanese at the time so the original English script was translated into Japanese for the actors. When interviewed, Cuadrado said, "I had to direct the actors based on their performances instead of the script. If I could tell where they were in the dialogue without understanding what they were saying then that was a good take". The film was embraced by j-horror fans who were intrigued by the Western take on Japanese horror tropes.

Cuadrado went on to write and direct the short film Monstrous Nature. The short took top honors at numerous North American horror film festivals. His experiences as a hostel manager in Harlem were the inspiration for the feature Harlem Hostel by writer/director Nestor Miranda.

After the death of his mother in 2009, Cuadrado took time off from film production to focus on his passion for design and programming. He co-founded Kulture Kick, a boutique web design and new media company. The company partnered with Tommy Wiseau to create officially licensed products for Wiseau's cult hit The Room.

Cuadrado returned to filmmaking after actress/producer Camillia Sanes (Camillia Monet) introduced him to entrepreneur Urs Brunner, the CEO of Boncafe, a Thai/Swiss coffee company. Brunner had been interested in investing in motion pictures so he purchased Cuadrado's feature script Dark Desert Highway and financed the thriller Devil May Call starring Corri English, Tyler Mane, and Traci Lords. Devil May Call was directed by Cuadrado and written with Wyatt Doyle.

He currently resides in Los Angeles where he continues to develop and direct features with manager/producer Deborah Del Prete and Coronet Entertainment.

== Filmography ==
- King of the Jungle (film) (2000) – Special thanks
- Rock Steady (2002 Short) – Cinematographer/Editor
- Juicy (2004 short) – Cinematographer
- Damaged Goods (2006 short) – Sound
- Chalk (2006 short) – Writer/Director/Editor
- Tales from the Dead (2008) – Writer/Director
- Monstrous Nature (2009 Short) – Writer/Director/Editor
- Harlem Hostel (2010) – Editor/Associate producer
- Time Trippers (2012 Short) – Director/Editor
- Devil May Call (2013) – Writer/Director
- Dark Desert Highway (2014) – Writer
- Tales from the Dead (2014 Thai Remake) – Writer
- Two Point Zero (2022 short) - Writer/Director
