= Alice Greczyn =

American actress and model

- Born: Walnut Creek, California, U.S.
- Occupations: Actress, model, author
- Years active: 2004–present
- Notable work: Wayward, an autobiography

Alice Greczyn is an American actress and model best known for roles in the films The Dukes of Hazzard, Shrooms and Sex Drive. She is also known for appearing in Lincoln Heights, and The Lying Game.

== Early life ==
Greczyn was born in Walnut Creek, California as the oldest of five children. As a child, Greczyn competed in figure skating. She was home-schooled in Colorado, graduated early from high school, and started taking classes at Front Range Community College when she was 15 or 16. Informed that she had to be 18 to take Colorado's nursing test, she decided to try modeling and relocated to California. Greczyn is of European and Asian descent.

Greczyn was brought up in a Conservative Evangelical tradition which she later rejected. Her book Wayward: A Memoir of Spiritual Warfare and Sexual Purity describes her journey away from "toxic" religion. She hosts the website "Dare to Doubt", a resource portal for people seeking to escape from a belief system.

== Acting career ==
Greczyn started her career with a role in the movie Sleepover. She later appeared in the Fox comedy show Quintuplets as a recurring character. She was also cast in the short lived show Windfall. Greczyn played a recurring character on both Lincoln Heights and Privileged.

Greczyn was cast in a supporting role for the 2004 comedy Fat Albert and appeared in the 2005 film The Dukes of Hazzard. In 2007, Greczyn appeared in the horror films House of Fears and Shrooms. The following year she appeared in the comedy, Sex Drive and the action film Exit Speed, opposite Fred Ward.

In 2011, Greczyn was a model for Victoria Beckham's denim and eyewear line. She appeared in three episodes of the ABC Family series Make It or Break It, playing a model struggling with anorexia. She starred as a series regular on another ABC Family show The Lying Game, as Madeline "Mads" Rybak.

== Filmography ==
=== Film ===
Year	Title	Role	Notes
2004	Sleepover	Linda	
2004	Fat Albert	Becky	
2005	The Dukes of Hazzard	Laurie Pullman	
2007	Shrooms	Holly	
2007	Investigating Love	Natalie Bansali	Short film
2007	House of Fears	Candice	
2008	An American in China	Kendra	
2008	Exit Speed	Annabel Drake	
2008	Sex Drive	Mary	
2011	Ghost Perv	Jennifer	Short film
2014	Stefano Formaggio	Jasmine	Short film

=== Television ===
Year	Title	Role	Notes
2004–2005	Quintuplets	Alayna Collins	Recurring role; 6 episodes
2004	Phil of the Future	Alice Da Luca	Episode: "Neander-Phil"
2006	Windfall	Frankie McMahon	Main role; 13 episodes
2007	CSI: Miami	Holly Reese	Episode: "Rush"
2007	Moonlight	Sam	Episode: "Sleeping Beauty"
2007–2009	Lincoln Heights	Sage Lund / Marika	Main role; 23 episodes (as Sage Lund); Episode: "Glass House" (as Marika)
2008–2009	Privileged	Mandy	Recurring role; 7 episodes
2010	Kelly Brook's Cameltoe Shows	Herself	Funny or Die skit
2011	Make It or Break It	Maeve Benson	3 episodes
2011–2013	The Lying Game	Madeline "Mads" Rybak	-
2013	Life Life in in Space Space	Alien Girl #12	TV short
2015	The Young and the Restless	Emma Randall	Recurring role; 11 episodes
2017	Major Crimes	Vanessa Blaine	2 episodes
