= Tales from the Dead =

- Promotional poster
- Directed by: Jason Cuadrado
- Written by: Jason Cuadrado
- Produced by: Monique Yamaguchi; Nick Rossier
- Starring: Toshiya Agata; Leni Ito; Sachiko Hayashi; Yutaka Takeuchi; Nikki Takei; Kiyoko Kamei
- Cinematography: AJ Raitano
- Edited by: Jason Cuadrado; Joe Faissal
- Music by: Valerie Opielski
- Release date: 2007
- Running time: 85 minutes
- Country: United States
- Language: Japanese

Tales from the Dead is a 2007 Japanese-language American horror film written, directed, and co-edited by Jason Cuadrado. It is an anthology of four ghost stories as told by a strange young girl with the ability to communicate with the dead; the stories deal with loss, pain, and vengeance as the spirits who tell them attempt to put things right in the world of the living.

The film is notable for being a Japanese horror shot entirely in Los Angeles with local Japanese actors speaking their native language, despite Cuadrado not speaking or understanding any Japanese at the time of filming.

== Synopsis ==
The film features four stories: "Home Sweet Home", "The Dirty Business of Time", "Chalk", and "Shoko the Widow". "Home Sweet Home" follows a family, newly reunited with their estranged son, as they face the remnants of the bad marriage and evil intentions of their home's previous owners; "The Dirty Business of Time" is about an old accountant trying to set his "books" straight after a lifetime of working for a criminal gang, and his revenge on the man who won't let him; "Chalk" follows a businessman, hungering for success and material wealth, who finds that time is the only truly scarce resource and the only one genuinely valuable; and "Shoko the Widow" is about a lady of leisure who has a deadly definition of divorce and meets young girl on a dark and foggy road.

== Cast ==
=== "Home Sweet Home" ===
- Leni Ito as Tamika
- Kiyoko Kamei as Manami
- Eiji Inoue as Shiro
- Masami Teramoto as Kyoko
- Daisuke Tomita as Kenji
- Masami Kosaka as Toshiro
- Eriko Yamaguchi as Akiko

=== "The Dirty Business of Time" ===
- Yutaka Takeuchi as Yoshi
- Kazumi Zatkin as Mai
- Mark Ofuji as Ebisu
- Arthur Shinomia as Hiroshi
- Satomi Okuno as Mika
- Hiro Saito as Sato

=== "Chalk" ===
- Toshiya Agata as Detective Minehiro
- Sachiko Hayashi as Detective Himiko
- Hidetoshi Imura as Seiji
- Daisuke Suzuki as Sheriff Harada
- Mari Endo as Kaori
- Keiichiro Hirayama as Takashi

=== "Shoko the Widow" ===
- Nikki Takei as Shoko
- Leni Ito as Tamika
- Hiro Abe as Jiro
- Yumi Mizui as Keiko
- Miley Yamamoto as Gin
- Makiko Konishi as Mari
- Masayuki Yonezawa as Kiyoshi
- Natalie Okamoto as Michi
- Yoi Tanabe as Reika
- Kie Ito as Ayame
