= Corri English =

American actress

- Born: Corri Englisby; May 10, 1978 (age 48); Atlanta, Georgia, U.S.
- Occupation: Actress
- Years active: 1980s–present
- Spouse: Ty Bentli
- Children: 3

Corri English (born Corri Englisby; May 10, 1978) is an American actress.

== Life and career ==
As a young girl during the late 1980s and early 1990s, she was a frequent host of Kid's Beat and a few other kids shows on TBS (prior to the merger of Turner Broadcasting System with Time Warner), including Feed Your Mind, which she co-hosted with Johntá Austin. She is the singer for country band Brokedown Cadillac.

English was born in Atlanta, Georgia, and graduated summa cum laude from the University of Georgia with a degree in journalism.

She worked with actress Danielle Panabaker twice in 2004—once in Stuck in the Suburbs and later in Searching for David's Heart. She is also a longtime friend of actress Christine Lakin, with whom she produced a short film.

From 2012 to 2013 she starred in the Fearnet on-demand series Holliston. She also co-starred in the same year with Tyler Mane and Traci Lords in Jason Cuadrado's Horror-Thriller film Devil May Call.

She is married to Ty Bentli. They have two sons and one daughter.

== Awards and nominations ==
In 2006 she won a Horror Award at the International Horror and Sci-Fi Film Festival for Best Actress for Unrest. English was seen in Ryan Little's 2007 thriller film House of Fears as Samantha. The movie was released on DVD March 9, 2010.

== Filmography ==
- Space Ghost Coast to Coast (1 episode, "Sequel", 1999) .... Galaxy Girl
- Shake, Rattle and Roll: An American Love Story (1999) (TV) ....
- Dawson's Creek (1 episode, "The Anti-Prom", 2000) .... Barbara Johns
- Going to California (1 episode, "A Little Hard in the Big Easy", 2002) .... Joanne
- Runaway Jury (2003) .... Lydia Deets
- Joan of Arcadia (2 episodes, "The Election" and "Queen of the Zombies", 2004–2005) .... Elizabeth Goetzman
- One Tree Hill (1 episode, "Spirit in the Night", 2004) .... Claire Young
- No Witness (2004) .... Britney Haskell
- Stuck in the Suburbs (2004) (TV) .... Jessie Aarons
- Searching for David's Heart (2004) (TV) .... Jayne Evans
- 3: The Dale Earnhardt Story (2004) (TV) .... Kelley Earnhardt
- RedMeansGo (2005) .... Lucy
- Without a Trace (1 episode, "Requiem", 2006) .... Amy Jordano
- The Bedford Diaries (8 episodes, 2006) .... Natalie Dykstra
- Unrest (2006) .... Alison Blanchard
- CSI: Miami (1 episode, "Going Under", 2006) .... Angela Downey
- Justice (2 episodes, "Shot to the Heart" and "Christmas Party", 2006) .... Kelly Wright
- Campus Ladies (1 episode, "Barri & Joan Rush a Black Sorority", 2007) .... Sorority Girl
- NCIS (1 episode, "Friends & Lovers", 2007) .... Lisa Delgado
- House of Fears (2007) .... Samantha
- Winter Tales (2007) TV mini-series .... Shannon / Tim / Mom / Rachel (voice)
- Killer Pad (2008) .... Jezebel
- The Tiffany Problem (2008) .... Tiffany Hane
- Broken Windows (2009) .... DJ
- Mrs. Washington Goes to Smith (2009) .... Zoe
- Hellcats (1 episode, Season 1-Episode 11: "Think Twice Before You Go.", 2010) .... Brokedown Cadillac, singer Corri English
- House M.D. (2012).....Kayla
- Holliston .... Corri - April 12, 2012 -
- Devil May Call (2013) .... Samantha "Sam" Carvin
- Planes: Fire & Rescue (2014) .... Pinecone (voice)

== Voice over ==
=== Video games ===
- Dragon Age: Origins (2009) .... Rica, Cocky Female Elf voice type
- Dragon Age: Origins - Witch Hunt (2010) .... Arianne
- The Elder Scrolls V: Skyrim (2011) .... Jarl Elisif the Fair, Brelyna Maryon and other characters
- Mass Effect 3 (2012) .... Additional voices
- Final Fantasy Type-0 HD (2015) .... Sice
- Fallout 4: Nuka-World (2016) .... Shelbie Chase (DLC)
- Titanfall 2 (2016) .... Ion OS
