= House of Fears =

- Official release poster
- Directed by: Ryan Little
- Written by: Steven A. Lee; John Lyde
- Produced by: Steven A. Lee; John Lyde
- Starring: Corri English; Sandra McCoy; Michael J. Pagan; Corey Sevier; Alice Greczyn
- Edited by: John Lyde
- Music by: J Bateman
- Production companies: Lonesome Highway Productions; Black Orchid Entertainment
- Distributed by: Your Indie Films
- Release date: October 7, 2007 (Shriekfest Film Festival)
- Running time: 86 minutes
- Country: United States
- Language: English

House of Fears is a 2007 American horror film, directed by Ryan Little. It stars Corri English, Sandra McCoy, Michael J. Pagan, Corey Sevier and Alice Greczyn. The film was released Direct-to-DVD on April 27, 2009 in the UK. The DVD release in the United States was distributed by Your Indie Films. The movie features a cameo from American actor Jared Padalecki.

== Plot ==
The film opens with a man and a woman arriving at a digging site somewhere in Africa. The man enters a nearby cave, and finds all the workers brutally murdered, while the woman discovers a monkey statue. As the pair flee the scene, the woman takes the statue with her.

In Salem, Oregon a security guard, Hamadi (Kelvin Clayton) arrives at 'The House of Fears' with his guard dog. Entering the haunted house, Hamadi finds a box containing the monkey statue. He senses something is wrong, but is attacked by his dog before he can leave.

Meanwhile, Samantha (Corri English) has recently moved in with her step-sister, Hailey (Sandra McCoy), after her mother remarried. While Hailey is sneaking out to a party, she is caught and made to take Samantha, much to the displeasure of Hailey, as they do not get along. While at the party, Hailey and her group of friends, Carter (Corey Sevier), Zane (Eliot Benjamin), Devon (Michael J. Pagan) and Candice (Alice Greczyn) decide to sneak into 'The House of Fears' to get a sneak peek, before the opening the following night, Samantha is also brought along.

As the group arrive at the haunted house, Zane allows them in and switches on the power, bringing the house to life. He attempts to contact his co-worker Hamadi on the radio but can not reach him. Devon and Candice find the monkey statue, but are told to leave it in the box by Zane. As Zane leads the group through the house, an angry Hailey picks on Samantha, while Zane attempts to get Candice to break up with Devon. As they all begin to have fun, Hailey apologises to Samantha for bullying her, telling her she is still angry at her dad for remarrying. Zane realizes that he will not be able to break up Devon and Candice, so switches plans and asks Carter to swap dates with him. Carter agrees, disappointing Hailey as she likes Carter. Zane reveals to the others his fear is sharp knives, Candice being scared of suffocating and Hailey being claustrophobic.

Zane sneaks off from the others and dress up in a miners suit. He jumps out at the group to scare them, before sending them off into the ancient Mummy section of the house. Zane stays behind to re-dress the mannequin he took the costume off. After doing so, the mannequin comes alive and stabs him to death.

While in the mummy's tomb, Hailey tells Carter her feelings about his swapping dates, causing the pair to fall out. Suddenly, a faulty prop cuts Candice's arm and the group hear the dying screams of Zane, prompting the group to want to leave. They go back to tell Zane, but find a pool of blood, and Candice realizes someone else is in the house. The group believe it to be another joke by Zane, and make Candice stay. However, Samantha soon finds Zane's body, and the group discover their phones do not work in the house. They panic and try to leave, all the while being stalked by a mysterious shadow. They go to the back-stage of the house to escape, but Candice is separated from the others. She becomes lost and winds up in the mummy's tomb, where she becomes trapped when the doors close. The rest of the group realize her absence and return to find her, guided by her screams. In the mummy's tomb, sand begins to pour out of the roof, filling up the room. The group make it to the door, but find it sealed shut. Suddenly, mummified hands emerge from the sand and pull Candice under, suffocating her. The sand clears away and the group manage to open the door to find a dead Candice. Devon mourns his girlfriend, before they decide to move on.

They make it to the front door, but the key will not work in the lock, and they discover the phone in the office missing. They find a map that shows them another exit, however it is on the other side of the house. They gather weapons, including a gun and a circular saw, before making their way through the house. They make their way to an Insane Asylum, where they find a terrified Hamadi begging for help. They try to help him, however he tells them the statue will bring their fears to life. At first they do not believe him, however Samantha reminds the others of the statue they found earlier, and that both Zane and Candice were murdered by their fear. Suddenly, the group are attacked by a scarecrow. They all flee, apart from Hamadi who is attacked by his evil dog. As they regroup after escaping, Samantha tells the others her fear is a scarecrow. Before long, a creepy grave-digger attacks the group. They escape the man, and run into another room where Samantha hears the office phone ringing. She finds the phone, but the scarecrow once again appears. Samantha, Hailey and Devon flee while Carter fights the scarecrow, but is ultimately electrocuted to death.

The remaining survivors enter a clown section, where Devon becomes separated from the others. A clown stalks him, hysterically laughing. Devon attempts to shoot the clown dead, but the girls find him and they run into a house of mirrors. As they make their way through, Hailey is attacked by the grave-keeper and dragged away from the others. She attempts to escape, but she is knocked out by the man. She awakens some time later in a coffin, the man barricading her in. While Samantha and Devon attempt to find her, they are attacked by the clown, who drags Devon off into the darkness before killing him. As Samantha finds the exit, she hears Hailey screaming for her help. Samantha decides to go back to rescue her, and manages to defeat the grave-keeper and save Hailey.

As the girls make their way to the exit, the scarecrow shows up and chases them. It catches up with them, and they manage to cut one of its arms off with the circular saw, however this breaks in the process. They run away, only for Samantha to be once more attacked. As the scarecrow is about to strangle her to death, she manages to break the statue, killing the scarecrow and allowing her and Hailey to escape The House of Fears.

As they exit the House of Fears, the statue can be seen shaking, presumably to reassemble itself.

== Cast ==
- Corri English as Samantha
  - Alexandra Nibley as Young Samantha
- Sandra McCoy as Hailey
- Corey Sevier as Carter
- Michael J. Pagan as Devon
- Alice Greczyn as Candice
- Eliot Benjamin as Zane
- Kelvin Clayton as Hamadi
- K. Danor Gerald as Elias
- Brian Wimmer as Mark
- Shannon Engemann as Lynn

Additionally, Jared Padalecki makes an uncredited cameo appearance as J.P., a young man at the party.

== Release ==
The film was released on DVD by Polychrome on November 24, 2009. It was later released by Synergetic Distribution on March 9, 2010.

== Reception ==
Dread Central gave the film a score of 1.5 out of 5, panning the film's bland characters, and lack of scares. Bloody Disgusting also gave the film a negative review, writing, "Overall, this is a film that despite coming with a cool story, it suffers from a terrible screenplay and equally terrible direction." Corey Danna from HorrorNews.net gave the film a more positive review while noting the film's lack of originality. Danna commended the film's acting, creature design, and cinematography
