= Brokedown Cadillac =

Brokedown Cadillac is an American country music band fronted by actress Corri English. The band consists of 4 other players, including English's song-writing partner Randy Dunham (song-writing, guitar, vocals), Jeff Legore (Bass), Don Ian (lead guitar), and Danny Reuland (drums).

The band's debut album "Somewhere In America" was released in conjunction with their performance in the 2009 Disney film Race to Witch Mountain starring Dwayne Johnson. Two of the band's songs appear on the Hollywood Records released soundtrack for the film.

In 2010 Brokedown Cadillac recorded a cover of Sweet's "The Ballroom Blitz" which was placed on The CW Television Network's Hellcats, and appears on the Warner Bros. Records -released soundtrack for the show, along with tracks by Ashley Tisdale and Aly Michalka. English co-wrote the song "Fly Away" on multi-platinum recording artist Sugarland's debut album Twice the Speed of Life.
