= Bizarre Tale of Revenge at Asaka Marsh =

Japanese novel

"The Bizarre Tale of Revenge at Asaka Marsh" is a Japanese novel written in 1803 c. by Santō Kyōden. The contents of the story are based on actual events. The novel was adapted into a Kabuki play in 1808, which garnered a large amount of popularity.

Kabuki actor Arashi Rikaku ll as Ghost Koheiji. Made in 1840 c. by Kohishi Hirosada

== Plot ==
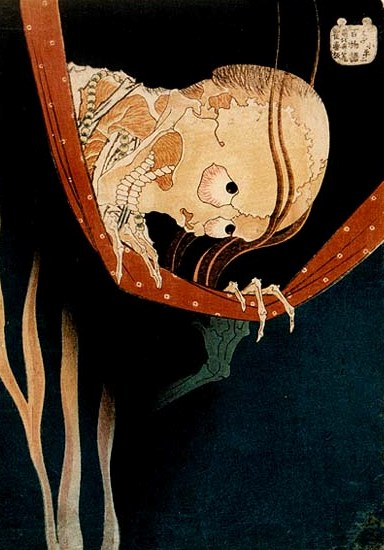
The Ghost of Kohada Koheiji by Katsushika Hokusai. Made in 1830.

The story begins with a struggling Kabuki actor named Kohada Koheiji, who is unable to secure any good roles at his theater. In order to help him along, his acting instructor bribes a director to cast him in the role of a yurei in an upcoming play. After this Koheiji was only ever able to procure yurei roles in any production. His wife, Otowa, becomes ashamed of this. With the help of her lover (a kabuki actor from the same theater), she kills Koheiji and throws his body into a swamp. Koheiji eventually returns as a vengeful yurei to haunt the couple.

== Motifs ==
A common theme during this time in kabuki plays is the role of the "evil women" or "poisonous women", which is generally called an akuba. This role appears in this story as the wife Otowa. This trope is defined by a character who is crass in behaviour, and has a tendency for vices like gambling, theft, and murder. It is made in contrast to that of the "dutiful wife" which is another reoccurring trope in kabuki.
