= Conton =

Conton may refer to:

- Bertha Conton (1923–2022), Sierra Leonean educator
- William Farquhar Conton (1925–2003), Sierra Leonean educator
- Attilio Conton (1902–1997), Italian runner

== See also ==
- Contern, a village in Luxembourg
- Konton, a 2011 music album
