= One Hundred Ghost Stories =

Woodblock prints made by Katsushika Hokusai

One Hundred Ghost Stories (Japanese: 百物語, romanized: Hyaku monogatari) is a series of ukiyo-e woodblock prints made by Katsushika Hokusai (1760–1849) in the Yūrei-zu genre circa 1830. He created this series around the same time he was creating his most famous works, the Thirty-six Views of Mount Fuji series. There are only five prints in this series, though as its title suggests, the publisher, Tsuruya Kiemon, and Hokusai wanted to make a series of one hundred prints. Hokusai was in his seventies when he worked on this series, and though his most famous impressions are landscape and wild-life works, he was attuned to the superstitions of the Edo period. This culminated in him creating these yokai prints of popular ghost stories being told at the time. The prints show scenes from such stories, that could be recited during the game of Hyakumonogatari Kaidankai.

== The One Hundred Ghost Story prints ==
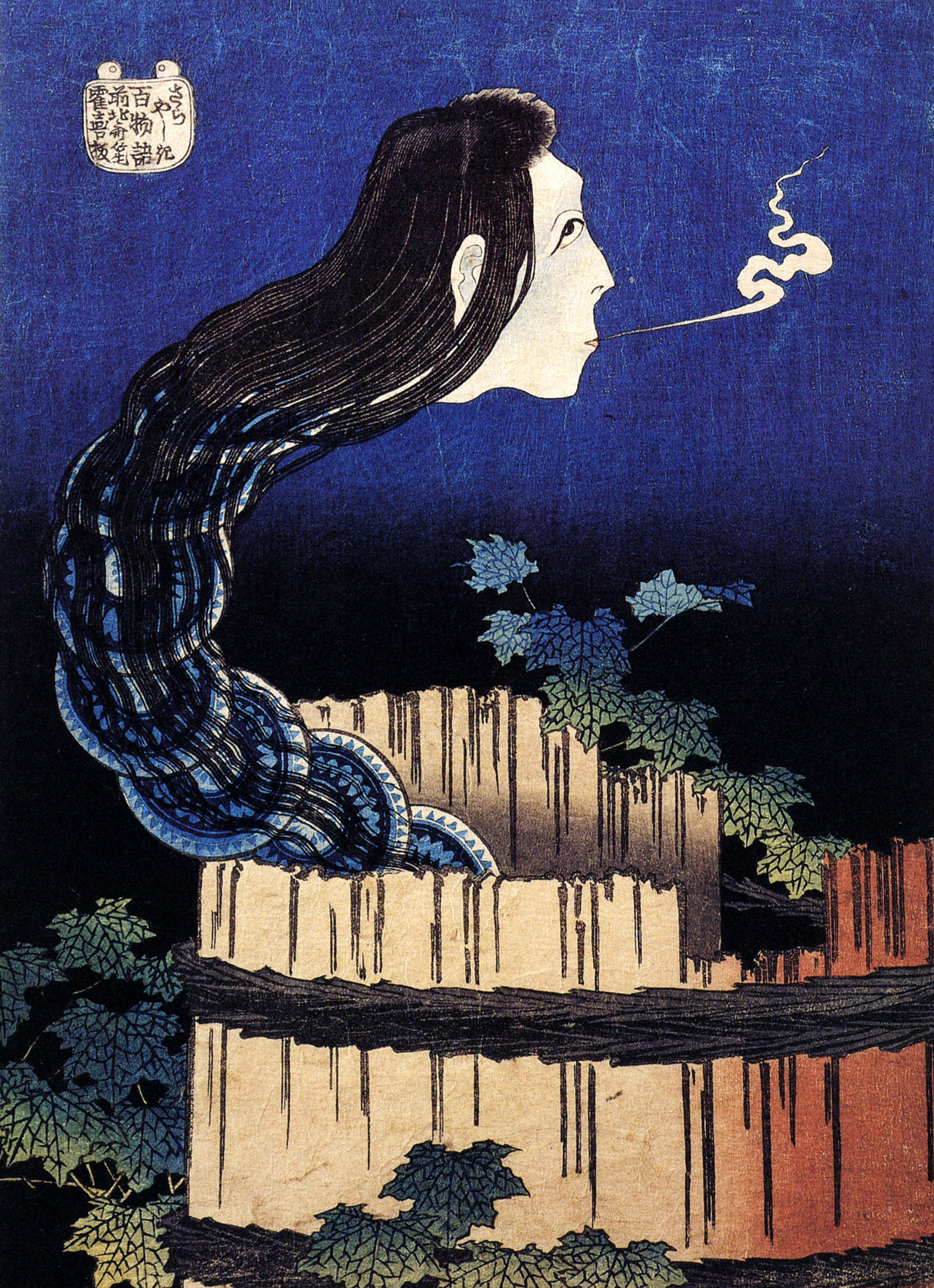
The Plate Mansion (Sara-yashiki)

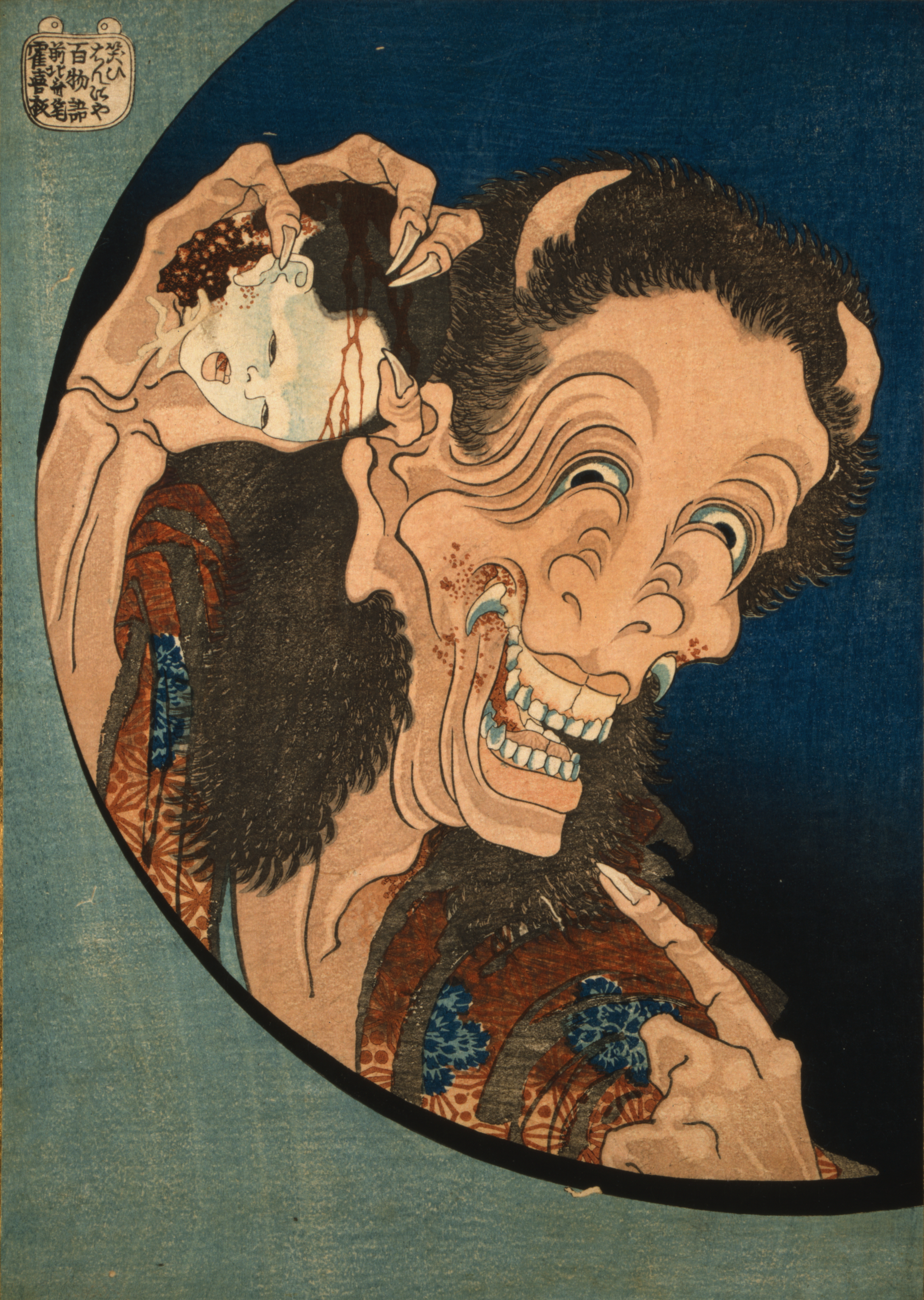
The Laughing Hannya (Warai-hannya)

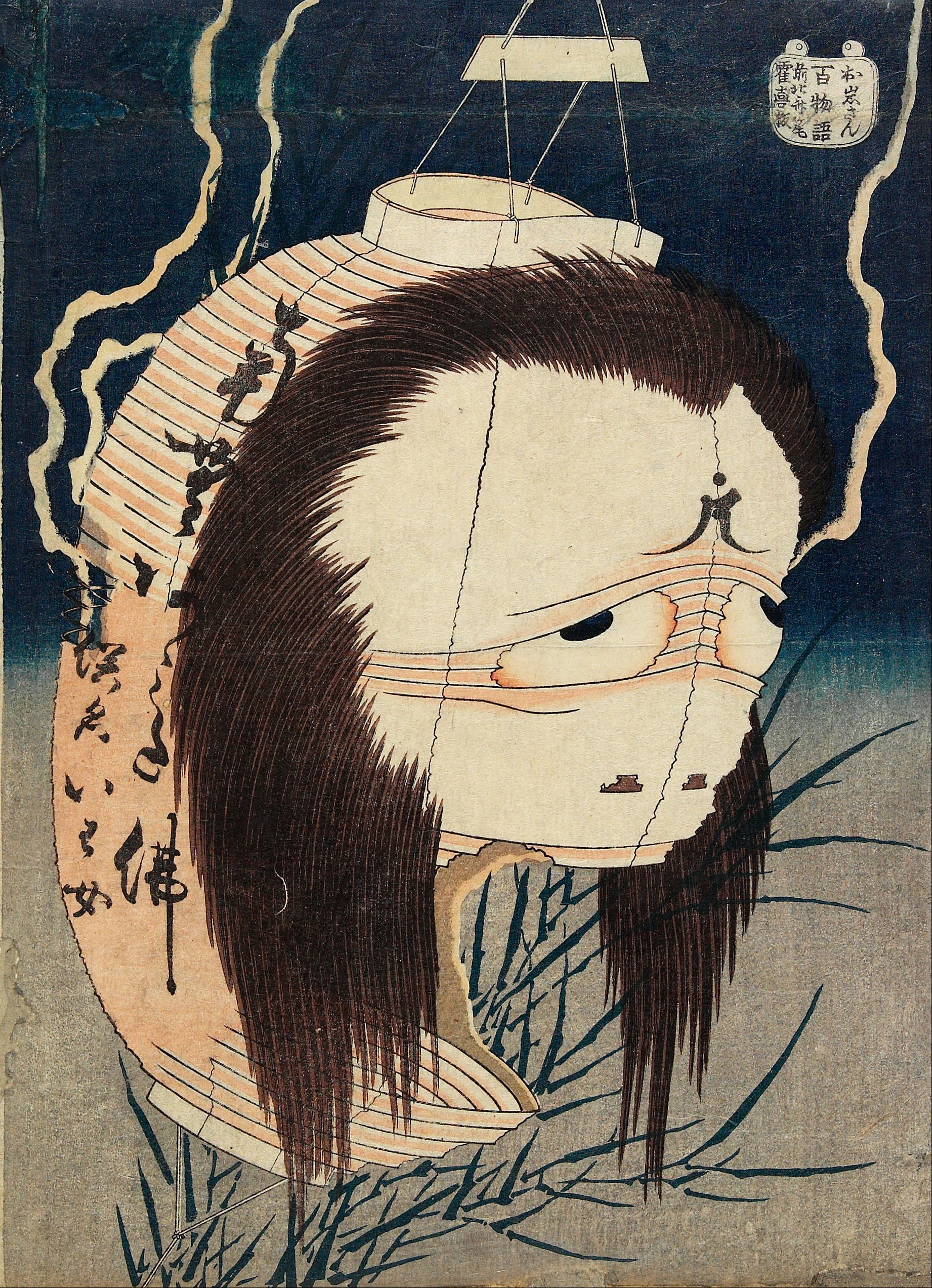
The Ghost of Oiwa (Oiwa-san)

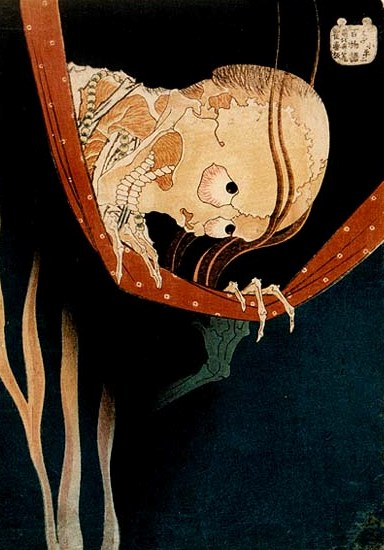
The Ghost of Kohada Koheiji (Kohada Koheiji)

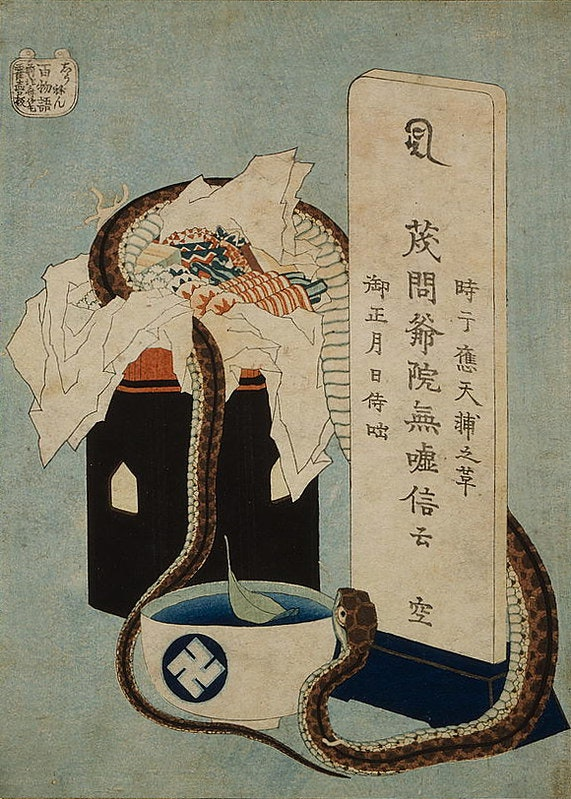
Obsession (Shûnen)

== Background to the game of Hyakumonogatari Kaidankai ==
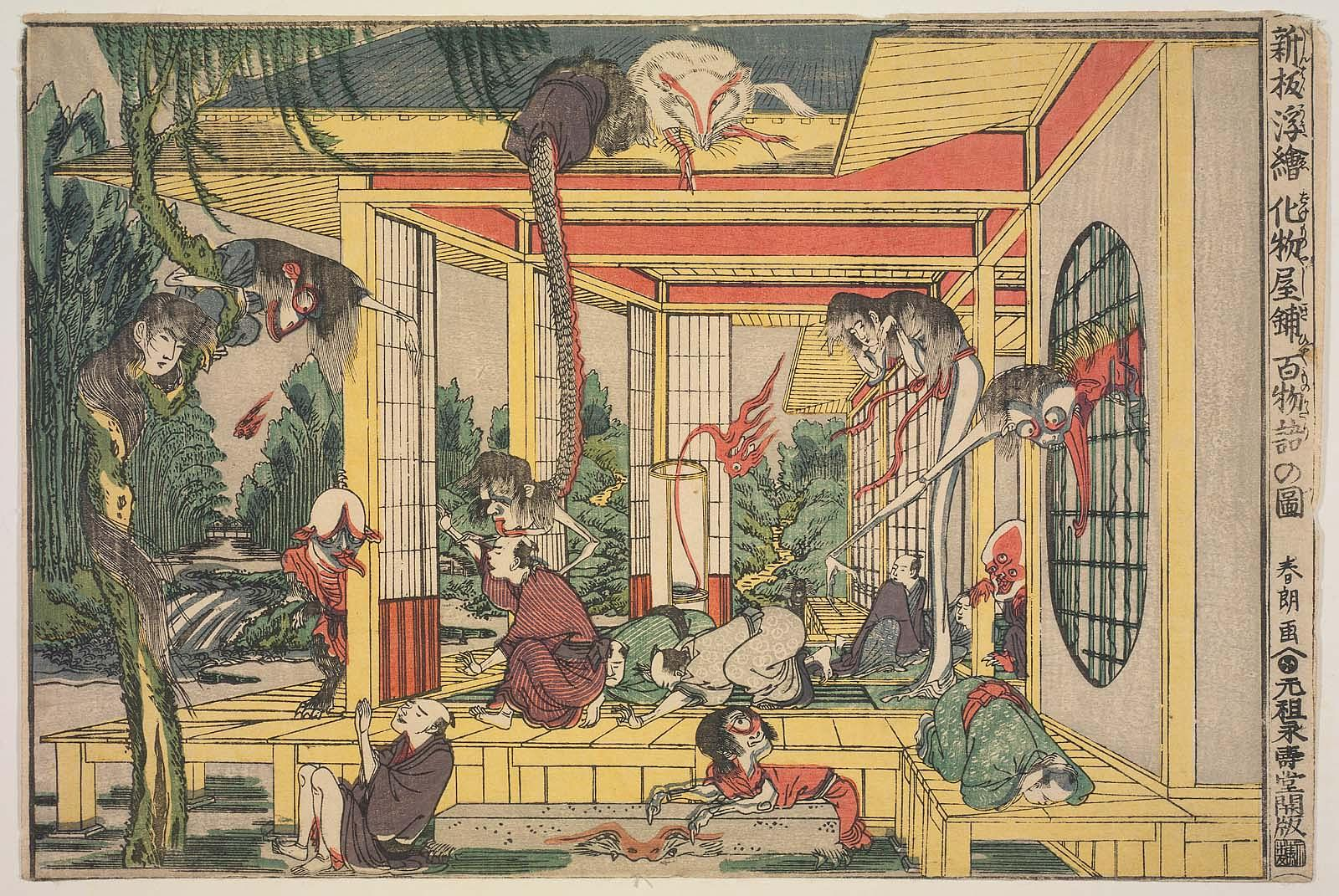
Hokusai, One Hundred Ghost Stories in a Haunted House (Shinpan uki-e bakemono yashiki hyaku monogatari no zu), c. 1790

The series is made in reference to the tradition of Hyakumonogatari Kaidankai, 'A Gathering of One Hundred Supernatural Tales', a popular Japanese game played at night, when people would meet to share folklore ghost stories and their own anecdotes. Stories were told one by one with a light of a hundred candles, blowing out a candle after each story. The game was first played by samurai as a test for courage, but quickly became widespread. It was believed that whenever a candle went out, a channel would appear that could be used by ghosts or spirits to travel into the world of the living, and after all the candles were extinguished, some supernatural event might occur.

The game originated as a religious ritual; Noriko T. Reider, a researcher in the field of Japanese folklore, states that "these gatherings may have had their origin during the medieval period in Hyakuza hodan (One Hundred Buddhist Stories), in which it was widely believed that miracles would happen after telling one hundred Buddhist stories over one hundred days".

=== The Plate Mansion (Sara-yashiki) ===
The legend from 17th century tells the story of a maid named Okiku who breaks a valuable set of Korean plates. The tale varies slightly on the events that happen next. In one version, she is thrown into a well by her master; another version tells that Okiku threw herself into the well in despair. Another version tells that Okiku broke only one plate. After she is thrown into a well, she turns into a Yūrei. The neighbours hear her voice from that well every night, repeating "One... Two... Three... Eight... Nine... I can’t find last one..." After the rumors of this spread, the house was confiscated from the master. When a monk adds "ten" to Okiku's count, she finally disappears. Yet another version tells that Okiku worked for a samurai named Aoyama Tessan from Himeji Castle who makes advances on her. After she rejects him, Aoyama deceives her into believing that she lost one of the valuable plates. Aoyama offers his forgiveness if Okiku becomes his lover. When she continues to refuse him, he throws her into a well. She then returns as a spirit to count her plates every night, "shrieking on the tenth count".

This is a well-known ghost story in Japan. The most popular version was established in 1795, when Japan suffered an infestation of a type of worm found in old wells that became known as the "Okiku bug" (Okiku mushi). This worm covered with thin threads made it look as though it had been bound. It was widely believed to be a reincarnation of Okiku."

Hokusai drew Okiku's spirit as a serpent whose body is made of a plates. Kassandra Diaz notes that while Okiku is a spirit, in Hokusai's print she "resembles a rokurokubi or nure-onna. An intelligent decision on his part as these yokai are much rarer than yurei, make this Okiku scarier."

The story was very popular, and many ukiyo-e artists made impressions based on it. These are some additional works inspired by this story:

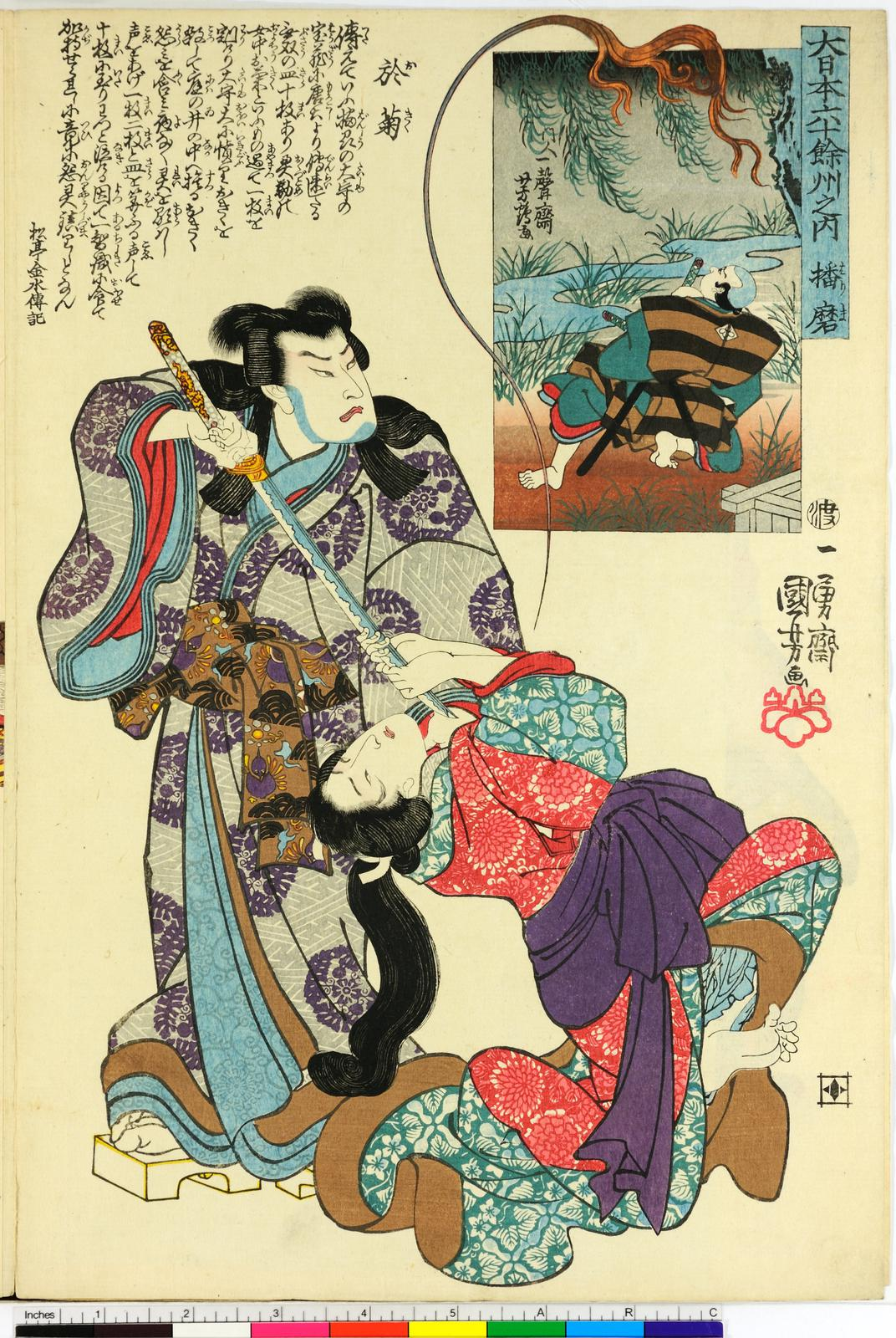
Utagawa Kunisada, 1843–1847

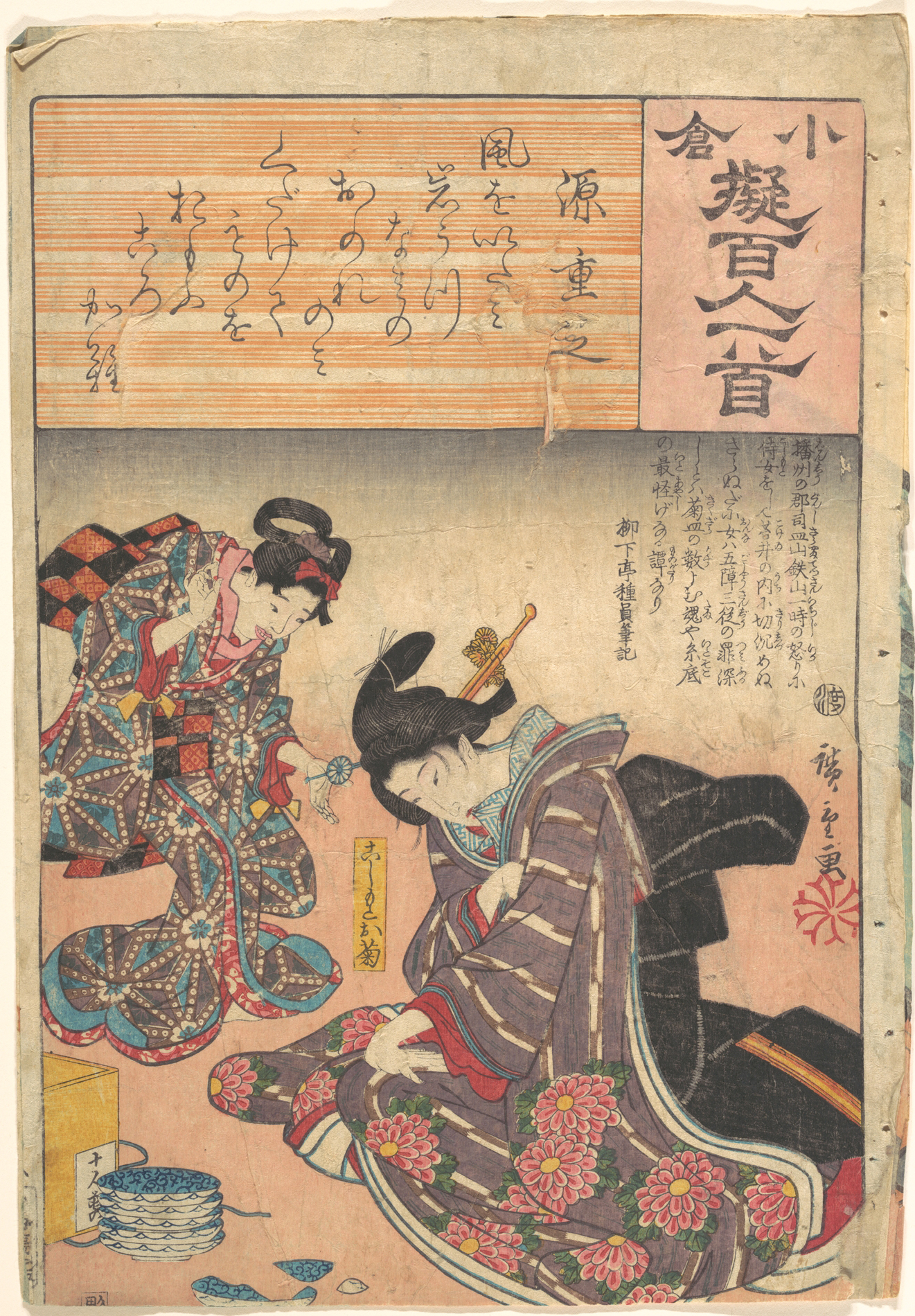
Utagawa Hiroshige

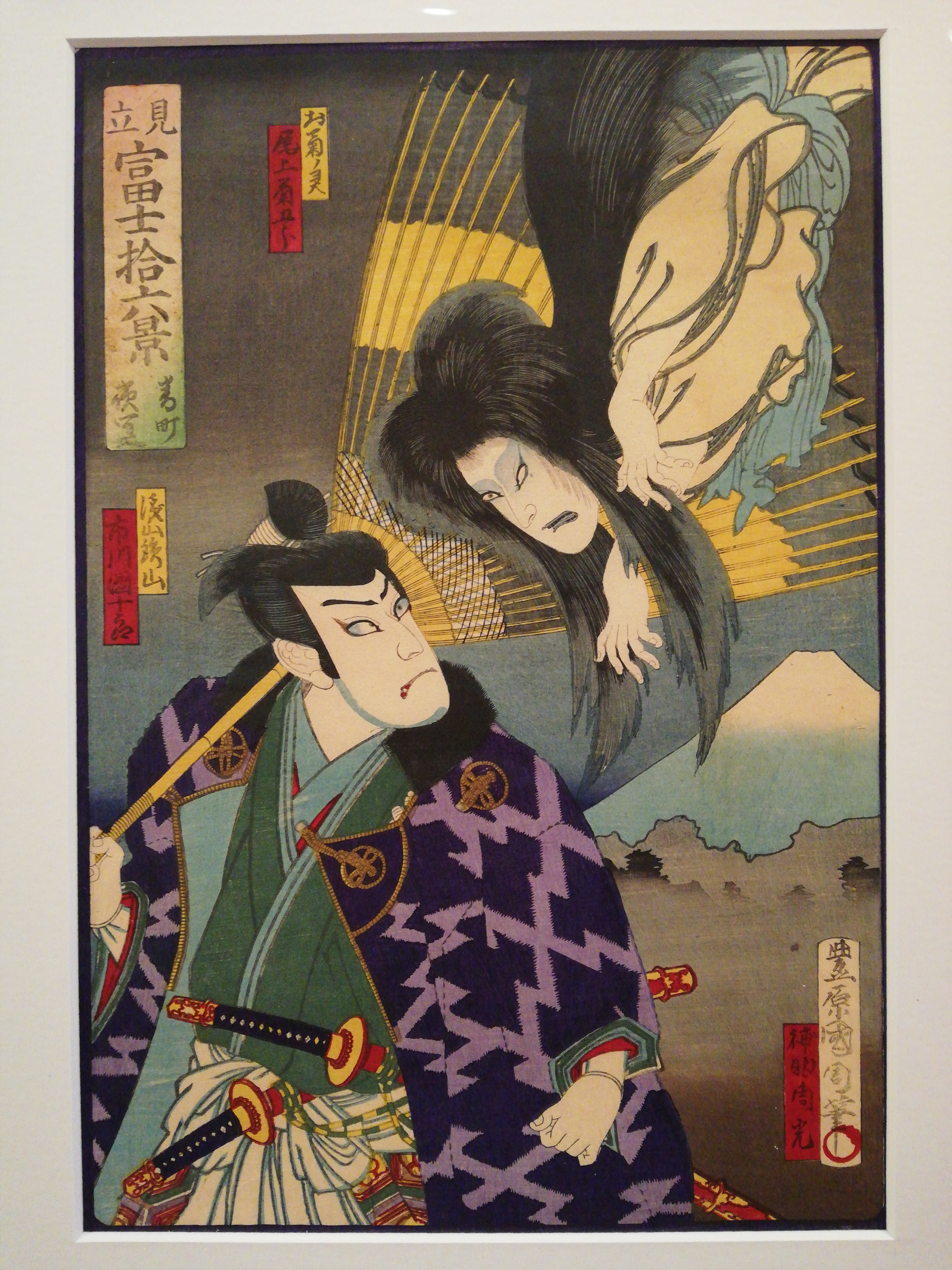
Toyohara Kunichika (1835–1900)

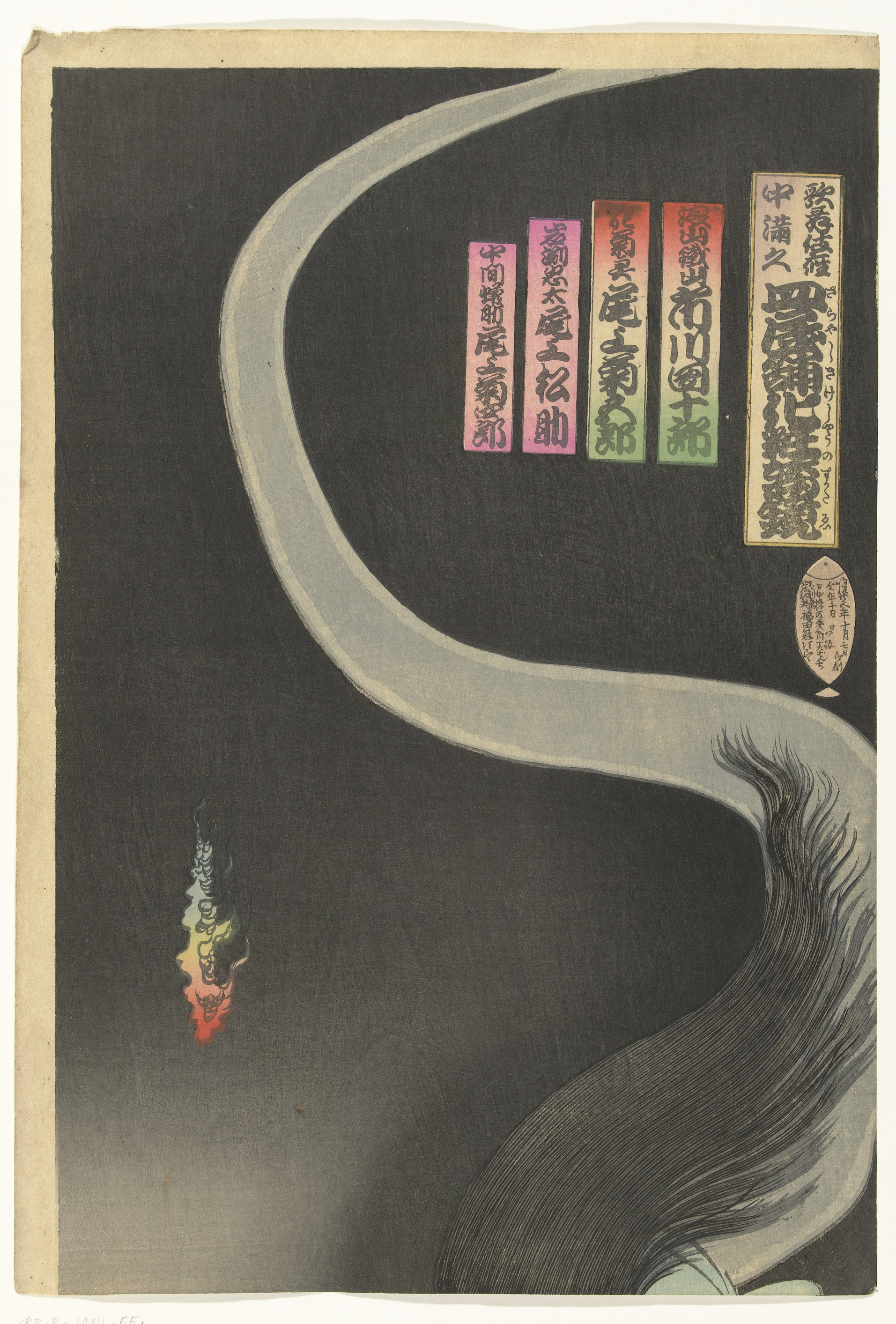
Toyohara Kunichika, 1892

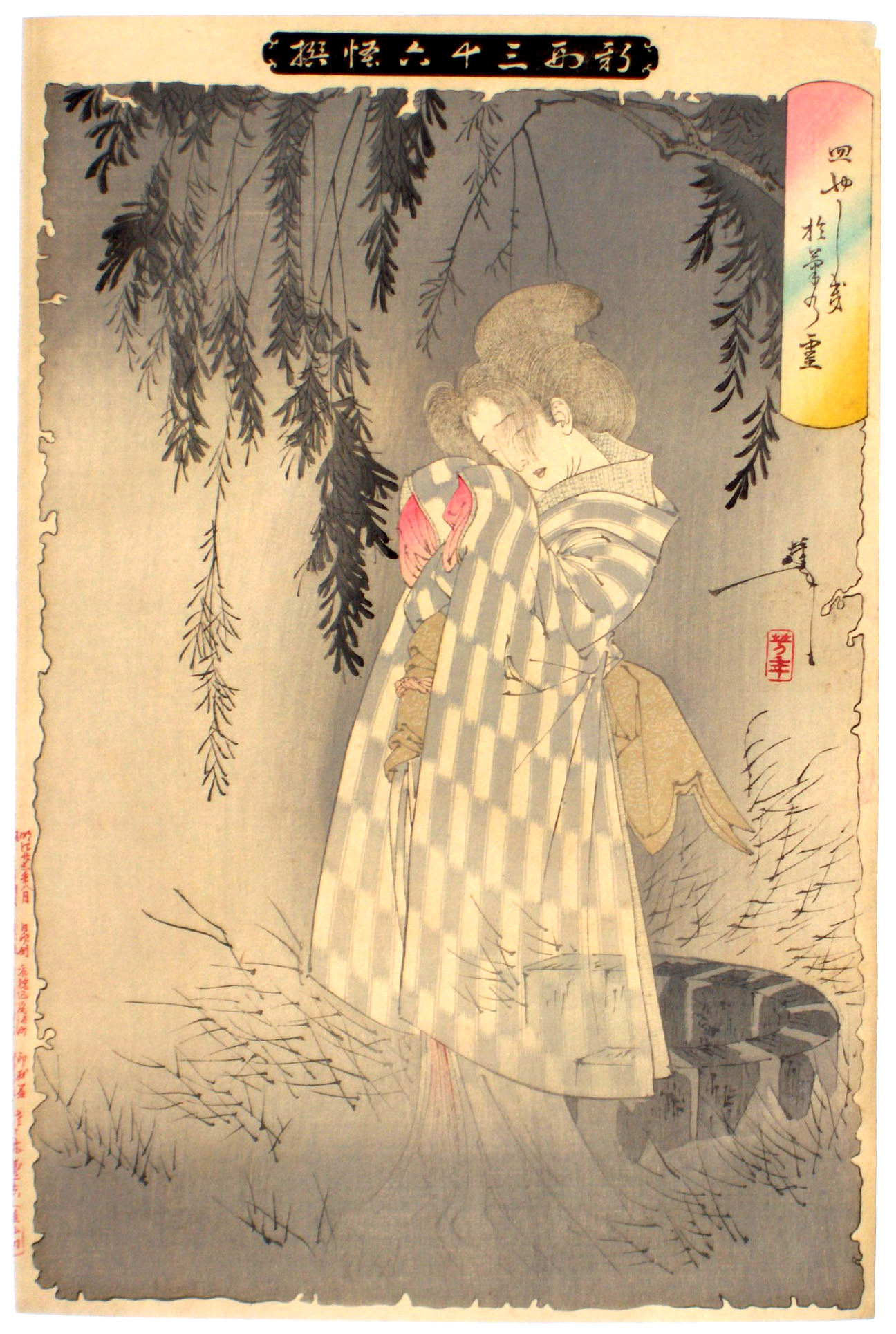
Tsukioka Yoshitoshi, 1890

=== The Laughing Hannya (Warai-hannya) ===
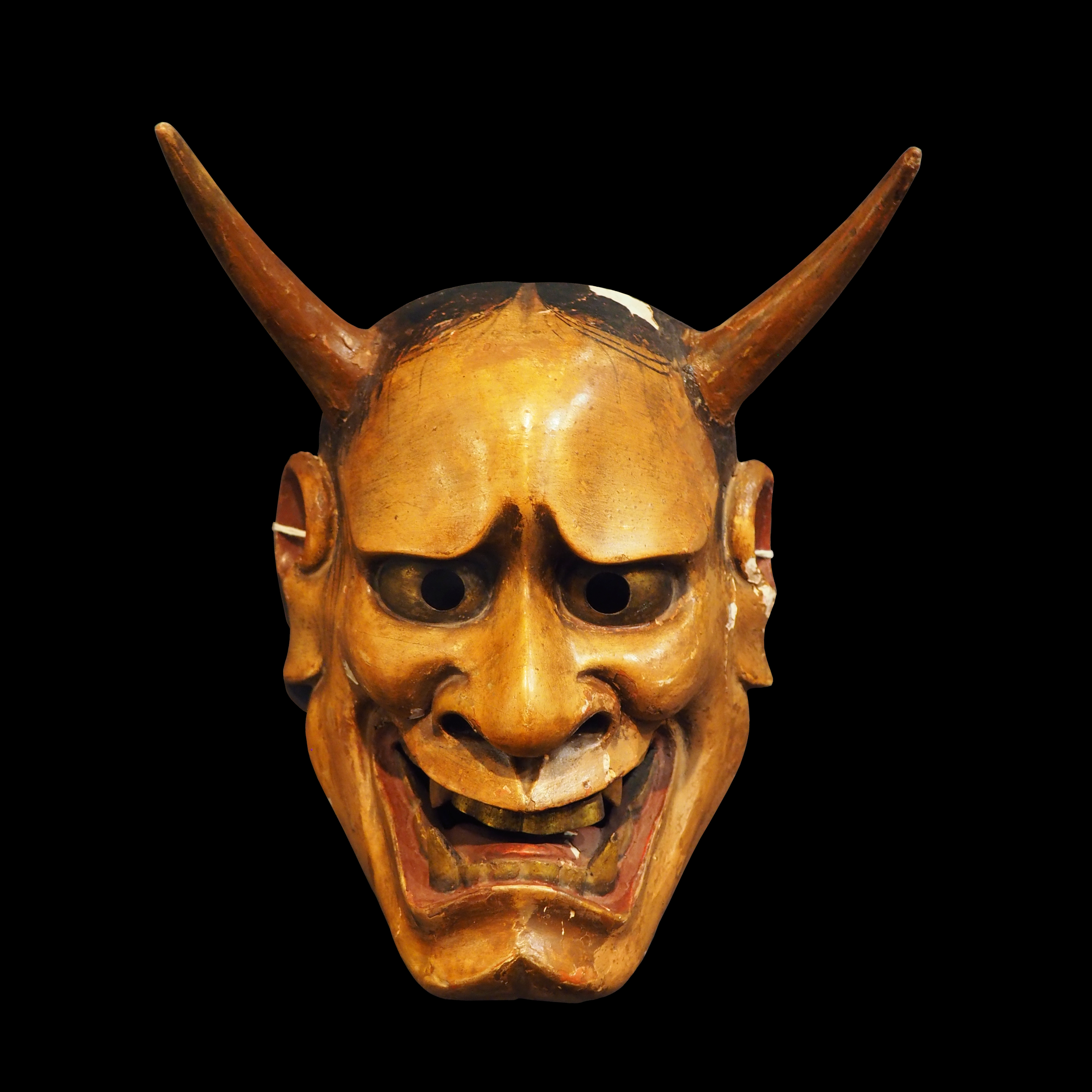
Wooden hannya mask

In this print Hokusai combined two folklore monsters; a hannya, an old woman was believed to be changed into a demon because of deep-seated jealousy, and a yamanba ("mountain woman"), a demon believed to devour kidnapped children. The print shows the monster reveling in her demonic meal of a live infant. The story is from the Nagano region's folklore. Warai-hannya was also called the Laughing Demoness or Ogress.

Hokusai divided the painting with a crescent arc that acts as a divisional line before human world and a supernatural, ghost world. The work has similar framing that is present in Hokusai's previous landscape prints such as View from Massaki of Suijin Shrine, Uchigawa Inlet, and Sekiya (1857). The plain background is akin to a wall, and the circle containing the demon acts like a window, with the viewer facing the outside world. The placing of the hannya outside of this window "brings it into the viewer's everyday life".

=== The Ghost of Oiwa (Oiwa-san) ===
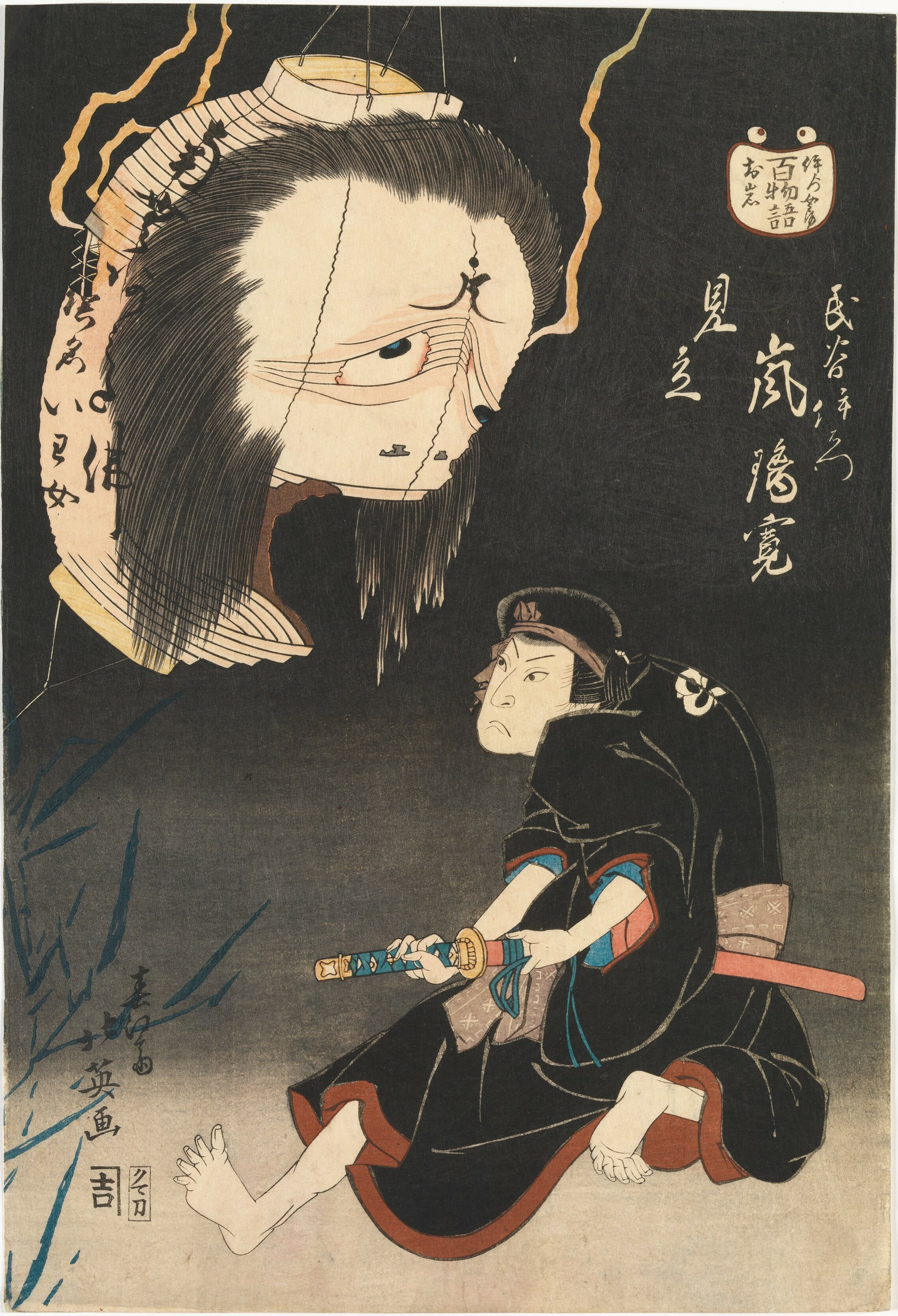
Kabuki actor Arashi Rikan II as Iemon confronted by an image of his murdered wife, Oiwa. Drawing by Shunbaisai Hokuei, inspired by Hokusai's print, 1832.

The story was originally a play for kabuki theater called Yotsuya Kaidan, and was written in 1825 by Tsuruya Nanboku IV. Several versions of this story exist. The one most commonly told begins with a young girl named Oume who falls in love with the married samurai Tamiya Iemon. Her friends try to get rid of his wife Oiwa with a gift of a poisonous face cream. This does not kill Oiwa, but it does ruin her face. Iemon eventually abandons his mutilated wife in disgust, which makes her go mad with grief. In her hysteria, she stumbles over and lands upon an open sword. She curses Iemon with her dying breath and then adopts various forms in order to haunt him, including a paper lantern.

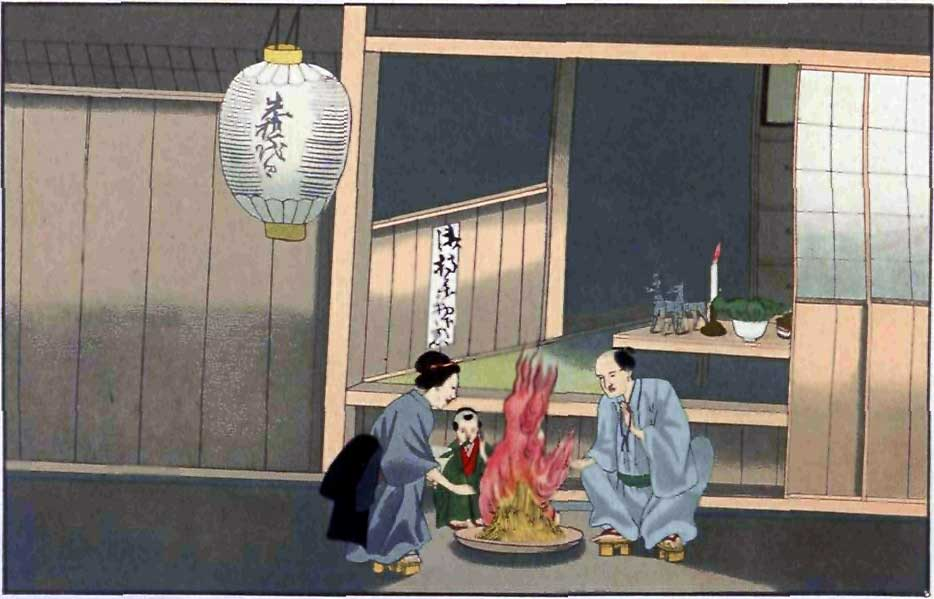
Depiction of Osurasma (praying a soul out of purgatory) in late Edo.

In another version, unemployed samurai Iemon marries a daughter from a warrior family, who needs a man to succeed their family name. He poisons and kills his young wife, and she haunts Iemon as a ghost. In another alternative, Iemon wants to kill his wife and to marry into a wealthy family, so he hires an assassin who kills her and dumps her body into a river. One more version states that Oiwa gets smallpox as a child which mutilates her face. Although her husband Iemon doesn't mind her appearance, his master wants him to divorce her and marry his granddaughter instead. When Iemon concedes and does as his master wishes, Oiwa dies and turns into a ghost, cursing the family. When people build a shrine to abate her resentment, the ghost disappears.

Paper lanterns were used in the Buddhist tradition mukae-bon, the beginning of Obon; people bring them to their family member's graves to welcome their spirits. In Hokusai's print ghost of Oiwa possessed a lantern, in accord with a belief of the lantern usage for communication with ancestral spirits. On the lantern there is an inscription: "Praise Amida / The Woman Named O-iwa". The calligraphy is written in choshin style, which is not typical of that used for paper lanterns. Kassandra Diaz writes that:

The creases of the lantern fold over her exhausted eyes, which point to the Buddhist seed syllable on her forehead. The syllable refers to Gobujo, a form of Yama, the lord of the underworld and judge of the dead. This may be a mark bestowed upon Oiwa by Yama, who punished her by returning her to the world in her "new body".

=== The Ghost of Kohada Koheiji (Kohada Koheiji) ===
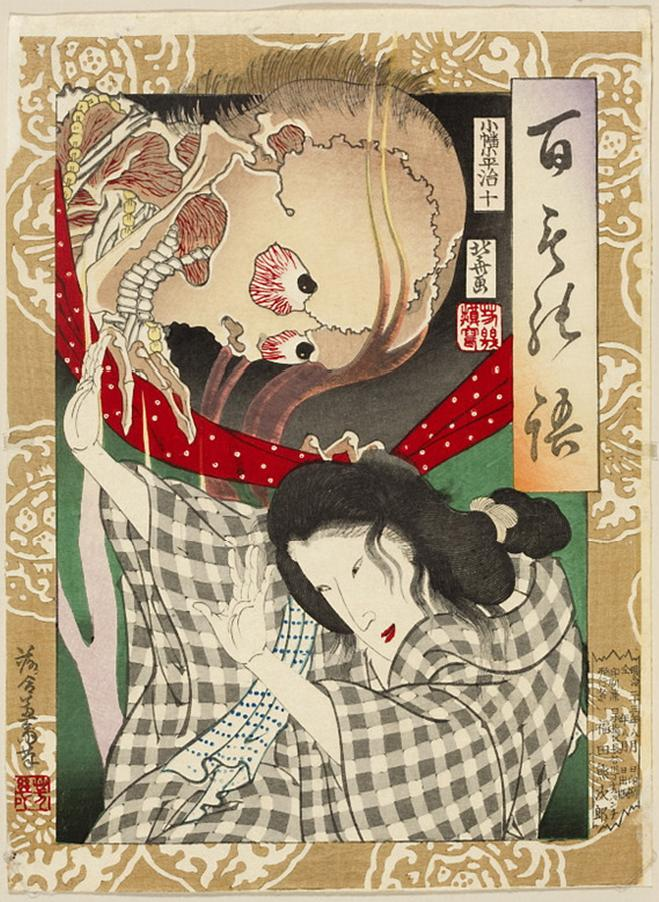
Utagawa Yoshiiku's Specter frightening a young woman, 1890, inspired by Kohada Koheiji print

This print shows a scene from a Japanese legend about a man who was drowned in a swamp by his wife and her lover. Kohada Koheiji was a kabuki actor for the Morita-za theater; as he couldn't get any good role, he was cast as a yurei, and could only get yurei roles from there on out. His wife Otsuka was ashamed of him, and together with her lover (another actor called Adachi Sakuro), she murdered Kohada and threw his body into a swamp. He returns to haunt them in revenge.

The work depicts a skeletal ghost with flames around him who has returned to scare the couple while they are in bed together under a mosquito net.

The writer Santō Kyōden, also known as the ukiyo-e artist Kitao Masanobu, developed the Koheiji story in his 1803 novel, Bizarre Tale of Revenge at Asaka Marsh (Fukushû kidan Asaka-numa). The story based on actual events, as Koheiji was a real murder victim. In 1808, the story was staged on the kabuki theater.

Kassandra Diaz noted that "He wears juzu beads which were used in Buddhist prayer by rubbing between both hands. Regardless of whether they were Kohada's or part of his yurei kabuki costume, the beads symbolize religious piety, which Otsuki and Adachi clearly disregarded."

=== Obsession (Shûnen) ===
This print shows a snake wrapped around a memorial tablet (ihai) for a Buddhist altar (traditionally placed on an altar at the home of the deceased); the snake represents obsession that continues after death. Offerings and the water near the altar tablet are for the dead. During Edo Japan, snakes in kaidan stories are usually the metamorphized spirits of the deceased. They are frequently the incarnation of women who died filled with jealousy, resentment, or scorn. In this instance, however, it is believed that that spirit of obsession being shown here is the artist Hokusai himself, prophesizing his obsession with his art even after his death.

The print was also called "Implacable Malevolence". The memorial tablet is from 1831 to 1845, when the Tenpō famine killed many people in Japan, including the person on the print.

The middle line identifies the posthumous name given to the Buddhist – Momonji (茂問爺), a yokai who appears as a bestial old man who assaults travelers on dark roads. This terror is far worse than witnessing a yokai – becoming one themselves after death.

On the bowl there is a Buddhist swastika, called manji in Japanese; Hokusai used it as a pen name. "Thus, another interpretation is that the deceased is Hokusai himself, whose obsession with the supernatural world has ironically turned him into one." The two symbols on the print are used in contrasts; the snake as a symbol of obsession, and the leaf on the water as a symbol of a peaceful mind.

== Reception and analysis ==
=== Ghosts and everyday life ===
Kassandra Diaz wrote that in the series Hokusai integrated ghost stories into everyday life:

An Edoite can never walk comfortably past Oiwa Tamiya Inari Shrine, Morita-za, castle wells, serpent shrines, or mountains without recalling Hokusai’s disturbing yokai. Thus, this series creates an intimate experience for each viewer to project the scary stories onto their immediate surroundings.

It was typical for the time period for people to be superstitious; "there seems to be a convergent point in Japanese society where individuals from all walks of life seem to unite in their belief of the supernatural". Hokusai himself could believe in ghosts, he was in the Nichiren Buddhist sect, and probably believed that "he would one day walk the earth as a phantom". Shortly before his death, Hokusai wrote a haiku: "Though as a ghost, I shall lightly tread the summer fields". Sumpter wrote that "this vibrant depiction of death gone a-hunting speaks to Hokusai’s belief in the supernatural". Tsuji Nobuo states that "Hokusai must have believed in ghosts to have created such realistic images of them".

=== Women's role ===
Each print in some way represents a woman who committed something that goes against the Buddhist teachings, so yokai stories "functioned as religious and political allegory to subjugate women in their societal roles".

The story of Oiwa, a wife killed by her husband, was interpreted to be a tale of marital relations:

The story teaches of the consequences of betrayal, cowardice and selfishness. Betrayal, because the hideous appearance of Oiwa was caused by the consumption of a potion given to her by the father of another woman who was in love with Iyemon; the potion was disguised as a medicine to help Oiwa recover from giving birth but caused a facial disfigurement, which subsequently led Iyemon to abandon Oiwa, disgusted. Cowardice and selfishness are indicated through the actions of Iyemon who, rather than admitting that he no longer wished to remain married to Oiwa, began to abuse her in the hope that she would leave him, thus leading Oiwa to commit suicide in despair at the rejection. The consequences of this immoral treatment of Iyemon and others towards Oiwa are insanity and death, which translate into unhappiness and loss.

=== Social instability ===
After the unification of the country under the Tokugawa Shogunate, civil war became "a thing of the past ... people could regard strange phenomena and terror as entertainment". But while civil war abated, the ruling warrior class left citizens with few rights or autonomy to speak of. Sara Sumpter wrote that in a single Kohada Koheiji print Hokusai shows the nation's struggle in the Edo period; "Through this single grotesque woodblock print, Hokusai illustrates the social discontent of the Edo society with a flawed system that was soon to fall." Ghost stories (and prints) appeared because of this period's repression and restrictions, and were "metaphorical social commentaries". Ghost stories were a way for the people to express themselves during these restrictive times. The popularity of ghost stories in the Edo period was "an indication of a larger social movement at hand".

This graphic depiction was crucial not just for invoking the level of terror associated with the ghost story, but for creating an ingeniously hidden metaphor of Edo society. With a ruling warrior class exerting an iron grip on the populace, ordinary citizens had virtually no rights [...] In this context, Kohada Koheiji is no longer just the ghost of a man wrongly killed, seeking his much deserved justice. He represents the deadening existence that plagued the commoner classes of the Edo period. As he peers through the netting of his victims’ tent, the unseen antagonists become not just Koheiji's victims, but the victims of the Tokugawa government—a mass of nameless protagonists persecuted by grim reforms and restrictions. The sadness and fear expressed in the Ghost of Kohada Koheiji [...] would ultimately tell the tale—not just of a man murdered—but of a social system fallen.

=== Modern views ===
Timothy Clark, Head of the Japanese Section in the Department of Asia at the British Museum, wrote that the "print series on the theme was the occasion for the elderly Hokusai to weave together powerful currents that had long gestated in his art of hyper-realism, macabre fantasy and even a certain humour." He also noted that in Kohada Koheiji print the origins of the modern Japanese manga are visible. "It is vivid and sensational with a fantasy that is very much part of the later manga tradition". The Guardian called Kohada Koheiji "Funny Bones", and wrote that the picture was likely "designed to induce shrieks of laughter as much as fright".

== See also ==
- Media related to Hyaku Monogatari by Katsushika Hokusai at Wikimedia Commons
- List of legendary creatures from Japan
