= Camillia Monet =

American actress and film producer

- Born: Camillia Sanes; Philadelphia, Pennsylvania, U.S.
- Education: Yale University
- Years active: 1995-present
- Spouse: Daniel Chisholm (m. 2006)

Camillia Monet (born Camillia Sanes) is an American actress and film producer. She began her career in acting, appearing in films such as War of the Worlds (2005), directed by Steven Spielberg, playing opposite Tom Cruise, and Seabiscuit (2003), opposite Tobey Maguire.

Monet is the CEO and founder of Esperanza Productions LLC, located at Hollywood's Paramount Studios, as well as acting & 1-on-1 coaching studio, Monet Studios. Esperanza Productions writes and produces films, television, short form content and commercials on all platforms. As opposed to Monet Studios, which provides coaching and audition preparation both locally in Los Angeles and globally via video platforms like Zoom.

== Early life and education ==
Monet was born in Philadelphia, the daughter of Esperanza P. Sanes, for whom she named her company. Both of her parents immigrated to the United States from the United States Virgin Islands in the 1980s. She is the youngest of six siblings: five sisters, each of which serve in various law enforcement professions, and one brother, a freelance artist.

As an undergraduate, Monet attended at the University of the Arts in Philadelphia to study acting on a full scholarship. She went on to receive her masters from Yale University's school of drama. While later working with Tom Cruise and Steven Spielberg, she was inspired to continue her filmmaking education and graduated from UCLA's producing program.

== Career ==
Monet began her acting career in theater in Manhattan, working at theaters such as The Roundabout Theatre with Bill Irwin, originating the role of Celestina in "Cloud Tectonics" at Playwright's Horizon and later touring the nation in the role, and becoming a member of the Blue Light Theatre Co. She worked for several years on and Off-Broadway before moving to Los Angeles. Her television acting credits include Law & Order, Saving Grace, Cold Case, and The Shield.

Monet has also worked as a private acting coach, professor at New York University and Woodbury University, and adjunct professor at UCLA.

After graduating from the UCLA producers program, Monet founded Esperanza Productions. Monet is responsible for the over-all artistic agenda at Esperanza: story development, attaching talent, sourcing and securing financing, implementing schedules and over-seeing and maintaining budget. Since its inception, she has guided Esperanza through the production of over twenty projects, most recently Devil May Call, which was acquired by Lionsgate and distributed through mainstream digital platforms, including Netflix and Redbox.

She also provides on-camera and in-studio coaching and training for actors in Hollywood and worldwide through Monet Studios. Monet is also an instructor at the Yale School of Drama.

Monet has been named one of the top female entrepreneurs of 2015 in Hollywood and was praised for her work in female empowerment by Splash magazine. She has been a guest artist and speaker at UCLA, Sapienza University of Rome, Scuola Di Teatro in Bologna, Italy, and Hollywood Women's Film Institute.

== Personal life ==
Monet married Daniel Chisholm on May 30, 2006 in Taormina, Italy.

== Filmography ==
=== Films (producer) ===
- Jenny (2013) - Producer
- Tale of Two Dads (2013) - Producer
- Devil May Call (2013) - Producer
- Love or Whatever (2012)
- Apples ( 2010)
- The Memory Of When ( 2009)
- Celestina (2008) - Producer
- The Winged Man (2008) - Producer
- War Cry (2007)
- Looking For Some Posse ( 2005)

=== Films (actor) ===
- Low (1995) - Brenda White
- From a High Place (1998) - Victoria
- Building Bombs (2000) - Isobel
- Book of Kings (short) (2002) - Carol
- Seabiscuit (2003) - Molina Rojo Woman
- The Silent Cross (2003) - Carmen
- Lookin' for Some Posse (short) (2005) - Girl on Horse
- War of the Worlds (2005) - News Producer
- Apples

=== Television (actor) ===
- The Shield (14 episodes, 2002–2005) - Aurora Aceveda
- Saving Grace (4 episodes, 2007–2009) - Marrisa
- Cold Case (2 episodes, "Static" and "War at Home", 2006) - Alegria
- Guiding Light (1 episode, Episode #1.12774, 1997) - Olivia
- Law & Order (1 episode, "Burned", 1997) - Ellen Rattinger
- The Agency (1 episode, "Soft Kills", 2003) - Adalia Montes
