= List of horror films of 1960 =

A list of horror films released in 1960.

== List ==
Horror films released in 1960
Title	Director	Cast	Country	Notes
13 Ghosts	William Castle	Charles Herbert, Jo Morrow, Martin Milner	United States	
Atom Age Vampire	Anton Giulio Majano	Alberto Lupo, Susanne Loret	Italy	
Black Sunday	Mario Bava	Barbara Steele, John Richardson, Ivo Garrani	Italy	
Blood and Roses	Roger Vadim	Mel Ferrer, Elsa Martinelli, Annette Vadim	France; Italy	
The Brides of Dracula	Terence Fisher	Peter Cushing, Martita Hunt, Yvonne Monlaur	United Kingdom	
Circus of Horrors	Sidney Hayers	Anton Diffring, Erika Remberg, Yvonne Monlaur	United Kingdom	
The City of the Dead (aka Horror Hotel)	John Llewellyn Moxey	Venetia Stevenson, Christopher Lee	United Kingdom	
The Demon of Mount Oe	Tokuzō Tanaka	Kazuo Hasegawa, Ichikawa Raizō VIII, Shintaro Katsu	Japan	
Eyes Without a Face (aka The Horror Chamber of Dr. Faustus)	Georges Franju	Pierre Brasseur, Alida Valli, Édith Scob	France; Italy	
The Flesh and the Fiends	John Gilling	Peter Cushing, June Laverick, Donald Pleasence	United Kingdom	
The Full Treatment	Val Guest	Claude Dauphin, Diane Cilento, Ronald Lewis, Françoise Rosay	United Kingdom	
Ginoong Misteryoso (Hari ng Kababalaghan)	Johnny Legarda	Pedro Faustino, Danilo Jurado, Lillian Leonardo, Vicente Liwanag, Cecilia Lopez, Oscar Moreno, Pugak, Jose Cris Soto	Philippines	
Gabi ng Lagim	Larry Santiago, Felix Villar, Tommy C. David, Pablo Santiago	Ramon Revilla, Cecilia Lopez, Myra Crisol, Rodolfo Cristobal, Nello Nayo, Dely Atay-Atayan, Myrna Delgado, Cielito Legaspi, Amado Cortez, Francisco Cruz, Dencio Padilla, Tony Gosalvez, Vic Santiago, Jose Romulo, Yolanda Guevarra, Elvira Reyes, Marietta Miranda, Aida Villegas, Paquito Diaz, Kasupang, Fernando Poe Jr., Zaldy Zshornack, Berting Labra, Paquito Toledo, Chiquito, Boy Francisco, Tony Cruz, Herminio Bautista, Boy Sta. Romana, Friendly Ghosts	Philippines	
The Ghost Cat of Otama Pond	Yoshihiro Ishikawa	Shōzaburō Date, Noriko Kitazawa, Yōichi Numata, Namiji Matsuura	Japan	
The Hands of Orlac	Edmond T. Greville	Mel Ferrer, Dany Carrel, Lucille Saint-Simon	France; United Kingdom	
Horrors of Spider Island	Fritz Böttger	Alexander D'Arcy, Barbara Valentin, Harald Maresch	West Germany	
House of Usher	Roger Corman	Vincent Price, Mark Damon, Myrna Fahey	United States	
The Housemaid	Kim Ki-young	Ju Jeung-nyeo, Kim Jin Kyu, Lee Eun-shim	South Korea	
The Hypnotic Eye	George Blair	Jacques Bergerac, Merry Anders, Marcia Henderson	United States	
Jigoku	Nobuo Nakagawa	Shigeru Amachi, Yoichi Numata, Utako Mitsuya	Japan	
Katotohanan O Guniguni?	Armando De Guzman, Jose Miranda Cruz, Fely Crisostomo, Tommy C. David	Willie Sotelo, Cecilia Lopez, Alfonso Carvajal, Blackie Francisco, Leleng Ubaldo, Jimmy Babiera, Lillian Leonardo, Vicente Liwanag, Dely Villanueva, Arsenio Almonte, Elisa Mojica, Danilo Jurado, Lilia Dizon, Norma Blancaflor, Bert Olivar, Pedro Faustino, Dadang Ortega, Fred Cruzado, Chiquito, Pugak, Dely Atay-Atayan, Chicháy, Jose Cris Soto, Monang Carvajal, Friendly Ghosts	Philippines	
The Leech Woman	Edward Dein	Coleen Gray, Grant Williams, Phillip Terry	United States	
The Little Shop of Horrors	Roger Corman	Jonathan Haze, Jackie Joseph, Mel Welles	United States	
Manananggal vs. Mangkukulam	Consuelo Padilla Osorio	Pugo, Lopito, Patsy, Chicháy, Aruray, Gloria Sevilla, Willie Sotelo, Bebong Osorio, Poleng Mendoza, Ramon Sales	Philippines	
Mga Alamat Ng Sandaigdig	Jose Miranda Cruz, Johnny Legarda, Manuel Silos, Fely Crisostomo	Oscar Moreno, Lilia Dizon, Ben David, Willie Sotelo, Bert Olivar, Pugak, Jose Cris Soto, Chicháy, Rita Moreno, Ric Bustamante, Myrna Delgado, Gloria Sevilla, Lillian Leonardo	Philippines	
Midnight Lace	David Miller	Doris Day, Rex Harrison, John Gavin	United States	
Mill of the Stone Women	Giorgio Ferroni	Pierre Brice, Dany Carrel, Herbert A.E. Bohme	Italy; France	
Pagsapit ng Hatinggabi	Teodorico C. Santos, Abraham Cruz, Cesar Gallardo, Cirio H. Santiago	Edna Luna, Bob Soler, Ramon D'Salva, Elena Mayo, Marilou Muñoz, Francisco Cruz, Ronald Remy, Leonor Vergara, Miriam Jurado, Jose Garcia, Chiquito, Teroy De Guzman, Vicente Liwanag, Menggay, Dely Atay-Atayan, Anna Marie, Paquito Salcedo, Felisa Salcedo, Oscar Roncal, Edita Clomera, Celia Rodriguez, Adorable Liwanag, Johnny Monteiro, Belen Velasco, Lito Anzures, Aida Villegas, Danilo Jurado	Philippines	
Peeping Tom	Michael Powell	Carl Boehm, Moira Shearer, Anna Massey, Maxine Audley	United Kingdom	
The Playgirls and the Vampire	Piero Regnoli	Lyla Rocco, Walter Brandi, Maria Giovannini	Italy	
The Priest and the Beauty	Koji Shima	Ichikawa Raizō VIII, Ayako Wakao	Japan	
Psycho	Alfred Hitchcock	Anthony Perkins, Janet Leigh, Vera Miles, John Gavin, Martin Balsam	United States	
The Secret of the Telegian	Jun Fukuda	Kōji Tsuruta, Yumi Shirakawa, Yoshio Tsuchiya, Tadao Nakamaru	Japan	
The Stranglers of Bombay	Terence Fisher	Guy Rolfe, Allan Cuthbertson, Andrew Cruickshank	United Kingdom; United States	
The Tell-Tale Heart	Ernest Morris	Laurence Payne, Adrienne Corri, Dermot Walsh	United Kingdom	
Tormented	Bert I. Gordon	Richard Carlson, Vera Marshe, Harry Fleer	United States	
The Two Faces of Dr. Jekyll (a.k.a. House of Fright)	Terence Fisher	Paul Massie, Dawn Addams, Christopher Lee	United States; United Kingdom	
The Vampire and the Ballerina	Renato Polselli	Hélène Rémy, Tina Gloriani, Walter Bigari	Italy	
Village of the Damned	Wolf Rilla	George Sanders, Barbara Shelley	United Kingdom	
The World of Vampires	Alfonso Corona Blake	Mauricio Garcés, Silvia Fournier	Mexico	

== See also ==
- Lists of horror films
