= Emperor Meiji and the Great Russo-Japanese War =

1957 Japanese war film

- Directed by: Kunio Watanabe; Masaki Mōri
- Screenplay by: Kennosuke Tateoka
- Story by: Mitsugi Ōkura; Kunio Watanabe
- Produced by: Mitsugi Ōkura
- Starring: Kanjūrō Arashi; Kusuo Abe; Minoru Takada; Shin Takemura; Susumu Fujita; Yōji Misaki; Ureo Egawa; Tsunemi Hirose; Fumio Hara; Hiroaki Kurahashi; Yoichi Numata; Jun Tazaki; Ryūtarō Amagi; Hiroshi Ogasawara; Ken Utsui; Tadao Takashima; Shōji Nakayama
- Cinematography: Takashi Watanabe (CinemaScope version); Nishimoto Tadashi (standard aspect ratio version)
- Music by: Seiichi Suzuki
- Production company: Shintoho
- Distributed by: Shintoho
- Release dates: April 24, 1957 (Tōgeki); April 29, 1957 (Japan)
- Running time: 113 minutes
- Country: Japan
- Language: Japanese
- Budget: ¥200 million
- Box office: ¥542.91–700 million (rentals)

Emperor Meiji and the Great Russo-Japanese War (明治天皇と日露大戦争, Meiji Tennō to Nichiro Daisensō) is a 1957 Japanese epic war film directed by Kunio Watanabe and Masaki Mōri. Produced and distributed by Shintoho, it was the first major Japanese widescreen feature to use CinemaScope and stars Kanjūrō Arashi as Emperor Meiji in what is regarded as the first portrayal of a modern Japanese emperor by an actor in a Japanese film. The ensemble cast also includes Kusuo Abe, Minoru Takada, Susumu Fujita, Ureo Egawa, Yoichi Numata, Jun Tazaki, Hiroshi Ogasawara, Ken Utsui, Tadao Takashima, and Shōji Nakayama.

Two versions of the film were produced: a "CinemaScope version" shot by Takashi Watanabe and a "standard aspect-ratio version" shot by Nishimoto Tadashi. The film premiered at the Tōgeki Theater in Tokyo on April 24, 1957. The CinemaScope version received its general release in Japan on April 29, 1957, coinciding with Emperor Hirohito's birthday, while the standard version was released on May 14, 1957. The film was a major commercial success, drawing more than 20 million admissions and becoming the highest-grossing Japanese film of 1957. Contemporary reports list an opening gross of ¥800 million and distributor rentals of ¥542.91–700 million.

== Cast ==
- Kanjūrō Arashi as Emperor Meiji
- Kusuo Abe as Itō Hirobumi
- Minoru Takada as Yamagata Aritomo
- Shin Takemura as Matsukata Masayoshi
- Susumu Fujita as Inoue Kaoru
- Yōji Misaki as Katsura Tarō
- Ureo Egawa as Yamamoto Gonnohyōe
- Tsunemi Hirose as Terauchi Masatake
- Fumio Hara as Komura Jutarō
- Hiroaki Kurahashi as Sone Arasuke
- Yoichi Numata as Ijuin Gorō
- Jun Tazaki as Tōgō Heihachirō
- Ryūtarō Amagi as Katō Tomosaburō
- Hiroshi Ogasawara as Kōichi Fujii
- Ken Utsui as Hirose Takeo
- Tadao Takashima as Nogi Maresuke
- Shōji Nakayama as Ijichi Kōsuke

== Production ==
Emperor Meiji and the Great Russo-Japanese War was conceived by Shintoho president Mitsugi Ōkura as a high-stakes commercial gamble at a time when the studio was struggling financially. Ōkura, who had taken control of Shintoho in late 1955, decided to break a long-standing taboo in Japanese cinema by depicting a modern emperor on screen. Production began in December 1956 under the banner of "Japan's first CinemaScope large-scale film". The project was budgeted at approximately ¥200 million and was shot in Eastmancolor using the studio's new "Dai Cinescope" (CinemaScope) process.

Kunio Watanabe served as general director and wrote the original story, with Masaki Mōri acting as co-director. Kennosuke Tateoka wrote the screenplay based on Ōkura's concept and Watanabe's story. The film was photographed simultaneously in two formats: a CinemaScope version shot by Takashi Watanabe and a standard 35 mm aspect-ratio version shot by Nishimoto Tadashi. Music was composed by Seiichi Suzuki, art direction was done by Yūzō Kaji and Haruyasu Kurosawa and special effects were by Sadao Uemura and Takeichiro Kuroda.

== Release ==
Emperor Meiji and the Great Russo-Japanese War premiered at the Tōgeki Theater in Tokyo on April 24, 1957. The "CinemaScope version" was released nationwide in Japan on April 29, 1957, coinciding with Emperor Hirohito's birthday, and was heavily promoted with the slogan that every Japanese citizen should see it. The "standard aspect-ratio version" was released on May 14, 1957, to accommodate theaters not yet equipped for widescreen projection.

The film was considered an immediate and unprecedented commercial success. Contemporary reports list an opening gross of ¥800 million and distributor rentals of at least ¥542.91 million (with some sources citing figures as high as approximately ¥700 million). It is estimated to have drawn more than 20 million admissions—roughly one in five people in Japan at the time—and theaters were reported to be filled beyond capacity. It ranked as the highest-grossing Japanese film of 1957 by distributor rentals. The film's box-office performance led Shintoho to produce two related titles: Emperor & Empress Meiji and the Sino-Japanese War (1958) and Emperor Meiji and General Nogi (1959).

In Taiwan, the film was released in late 1957 and proved a significant box-office success. Among those who saw it were President Chiang Kai-shek, who viewed it on October 29, 1957, praising it in his diary and writer Wu Hsin-jung, who noted in his diary entry of December 1, 1957 that the film became "very popular and broke past records".
