= Kurama Tengu: Kyōfu Jidai =

1928 film

- DVD cover
- Directed by: Teppei Yamaguchi
- Screenplay by: Fujio Kimura
- Story by: Jirō Osaragi
- Starring: Kanjuro Arashi; Reizaburo Yamamoto; Takasaburo Nakamura; Tokusho Arashi
- Narrated by: Midori Sawato (DVD)
- Cinematography: Tokitsu Ishikawa
- Distributed by: Digital Meme (DVD)
- Release date: 30 November 1928 (Japan)
- Running time: 38 minutes
- Country: Japan
- Language: Silent

Kurama Tengu: Kyōfu Jidai (Japanese: 鞍馬天狗 恐怖時代; lit. "The Frightful Era of Kurama Tengu") is a 1928 black and white Japanese silent film with benshi accompaniment directed by Teppei Yamaguchi. It is part of the Kurama Tengu series and features the battle between the title character, Kurama Tengu, and his impostor. The last scene, featuring sword fights, is one reason this series was very popular, especially with children.

== Plot ==
This synopsis comes from Sean D. O'Reilly:

In the 1928 Kurama Tengu, Kurama is captured by pro-Tokugawa forces and, in a role reversal sure to have pleased the adolescent crowd, the child Sugisaku must rescue Kurama from Kondō Isami, who is on his way to the jail to kill him. The midpoint of the film, thirty-five minutes in, is the true emotional climax: Sugisaku leaps up to prevent Kondō from crossing a bridge and makes such a passionate speech about honor and how Kurama is Japan's great national treasure that Kondō is moved by his sincerity and, with a twinkle in his eye, pretends not to know the way to Osaka, nudging thick-witted Sugisaku into realizing that Kondō is letting himself be misled as to which road to take. This moment is the earliest extant instance of "partiality toward the defeated" (hōgan biiki) and the comrades-yet-enemies bond, subsequently emphasized in many films between Kurama and Kondō, as patriots and men of honor. The scene explicitly identifies Kurama Tengu as a national, rather than parochial, hero, and Kondō's magnanimous actions elevate him to the same national level. This revisionist outlook on Kondō Isami as a strong yet honorable opponent draws a contrast to the rest of the pro-Tokugawa rabble... Kurama Tengu is also filled with exciting sword-fighting sequences.

== Cast ==
- Kanjuro Arashi
- Reizaburo Yamamoto
- Takasaburo Nakamura
- Tokusho Arashi

== See also ==
- Kurama Tengu (film)
- Kurama Tengu ōedo ihen
