= The Ghost of Yotsuya (Shintoho film) =

- Japanese film poster
- Directed by: Nobuo Nakagawa
- Screenplay by: Masayoshi Ônuki; Yoshihiro Ishikawa
- Based on: Yotsuya Kaidan by Nanboku Tsuruya
- Produced by: Mitsugu Okura
- Starring: Shigeru Amachi
- Cinematography: Tadashi Nishimoto
- Music by: Chumei Watanabe
- Production company: Shintoho
- Release date: 11 July 1959 (Japan)
- Running time: 76 minutes
- Country: Japan
- Language: Japanese

The Ghost of Yotsuya (Japanese: 東海道四谷怪談, Hepburn: Tōkaidō Yotsuya Kaidan) is a 1959 Japanese supernatural horror film directed by Nobuo Nakagawa. The film is based on the kabuki play Yotsuya Kaidan. It was among the many horror films that Nakagawa adapted for Shintoho in the late 1950s and was one of the many adaptations of the play, including a twin release with a Daiei film of the same name released in 1959.

== Plot ==
Ruthless ronin Iemon Tamiya waits outside of the home of samurai Samon to beg him to let him marry his daughter, Iwa. He is insulted by Samon and his companion Sato. Enraged, Iemon attacks Samon and Sato, killing them. Naosuke, a low-ranking criminal, witnesses the murders and offers his silence in exchange for Iemon's help. The two conspire to convince Iwa and her sister, Sode, that their father had been murdered by known criminal Usaburo. They plan to murder Yomoshichi, Sato's son and Sode's fiancé, so that Naosuke can marry Sode. They stab Yomoshichi and push him off a waterfall.

A year later, Iemon and Iwa are married and living in Edo with their infant son. Unbeknownst to Iwa, Sode and Naosuke are also living together in the same city. Tiring of his lack of status and his marriage to Iwa, Iemon begins to court Ume, daughter of the nobleman Ito. He and Naosuke plan to poison Iwa so that Iemon can marry Ume and become a wealthy nobleman. Naosuke tracks down Usaburo and kills him. Iemon recruits the masseur Takuetsu to seduce his wife, thus allowing Iemon to legally kill her for adultery. After failing to seduce Iwa, Takuetsu tells her about Iemon's plan. Having been poisoned by Iemon, Iwa's face breaks out in horrific boils. Enraged at the betrayal, Iwa attacks Takuetsu with a razor, but mortally wounds herself. As she dies, she swears revenge on Iemon. Iemon returns to the house and kills Takuetsu. He and Naosuke nail the bodies to shutters and sink them in the river.

That same night, Iemon is wed to Ume. Soon, both Iemon and Naosuke are haunted by visions of the dead and deformed Iwa and Takuetsu. The terrified Iemon attacks the spirit at his new home at night, accidentally killing Ume as well as both of her parents. He flees to Zuihouji Temple in search of sanctuary. That same night, Iwa's ghost visits Sode and Naosuke. Upon seeing her, the terrified Naosuke confesses to his crimes and flees to the same temple. Sode treats Iwa's ghost kindly and returns a comb Iemon stole from her, and she leads Sode to the home of Yomoshichi, who survived the attempted murder. Yomoshichi and Sode resolve to avenge their slain loved ones.

At the temple, Naosuke taunts Iemon, who kills him. Yomoshichi and Sode arrive with swords in hand and vow vengeange against Iemon. Driven mad by the spirits of Iwa and Takuetsu, he flies into a mad rage and is killed. The film ends with a vision of Iwa, at peace with her appearance restored and her infant son in her arms, her spirit now able to rest with her revenge complete.

== Cast ==
- Shigeru Amachi as Iemon Tamiya
- Katsuko Wakasugi as Oiwa
- Shuntarō Emi as Naosuke
- Ryūzaburō Nakamura as Yomoshichi
- Noriko Kitazawa as Osode
- Junko Ikeuchi as Ume Itō
- Kikuko Hanaoka as Maki
- Hiroshi Hayashi as Kihē Itō
- Jun Ōtomo as Takuetsu
- Shinjirō Asano as Samo

== Background ==
Director Nobuo Nakgawa directed over 100 films by the time of his death in 1984, and about eight horror films, most of which were shot between 1956 and 1960 at Shintoho studios with tight deadlines and low budgets.

== Release ==
The Ghost of Yotsuya was released in Japan on July 11, 1959. The film was released in the United States by Shimoto Enterprises with English subtitles.

== Reception ==
From retrospective reviews, James Marriott commented on the film in the book The Definitive Guide to Horror Movies, proclaiming of the many adaptations of the play that "Nakagawa's is the classic." noting that the visuals in the film take on a "hallucinatory quality" specifically mentioning the swamp scenes and the scenes that slide into "Jigoku styled madness"

== See also ==
- List of horror films of the 1950s
