= Takarazuka =

Takarazuka can refer to

- Takarazuka, Hyōgo, a city in Hyōgo Prefecture, Japan
- Takarazuka Revue, a Japanese all-female theater troupe in Japan
  - Takarazuka Grand Theater, the Revue's home theater in Takarazuka, Hyōgo
  - Tokyo Takarazuka Theater, the Revue's theater in Tokyo
  - Takarazuka Eiga, a film production company from Takarazuka Revue theater
- Takarazuka Kinen, a horse race in Japan
