= Sen'un Ajia no Joō =

- Directed by: Hiromasa Nomura
- Written by: Akira Onozawa (writer); Shinichi Sekizawa (writer)
- Produced by: Shintoho
- Cinematography: Susumu Yamanaka
- Release date: 28 December 1957
- Running time: 95 minutes
- Country: Japan
- Language: Japanese

Sen'un Ajia no Joō (戦雲アジアの女王; "War Clouds Queen of Asia") is a 1957 color Japanese film drama directed by Hiromasa Nomura. The film is about Yoshiko Kawashima. Its English title is "Queen of Asia".

== Cast ==
- Ureo Egawa
- Kazuo Kodama
- Shōji Nakayama
- Tomohiko Ohtani
- Takihiro Oka
- Hirotaro Sugiyama
- Miyuki Takakura
- Tadao Takashima
- Tetsurō Tamba
- Ken Utsui
