= Shigeru Amachi =

Japanese actor (1931–1985)

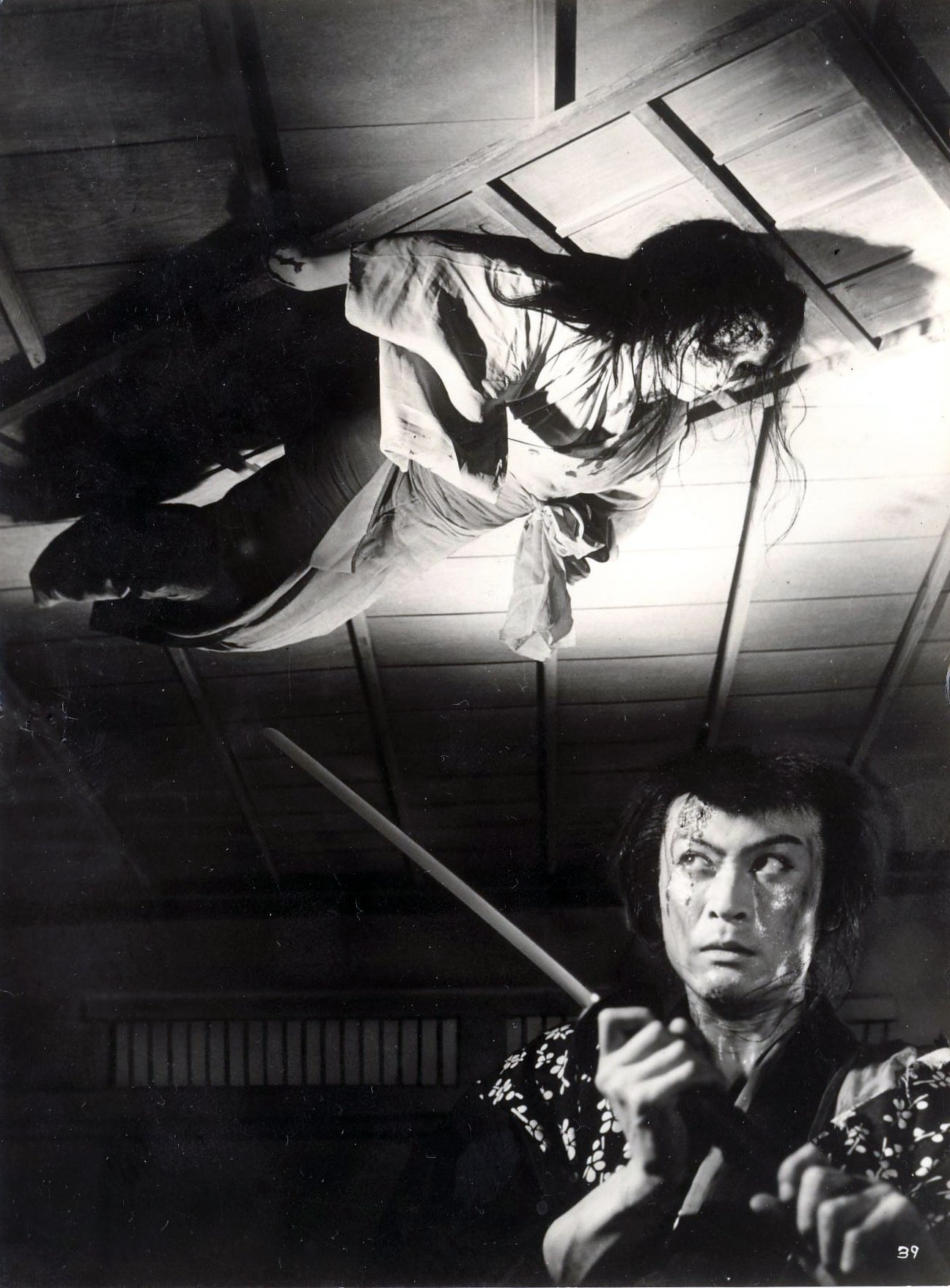
- Born: 4 March 1931
- Died: 27 July 1985 (aged 54)
- Occupation: Actor
- Years active: 1953–1984

Shigeru Amachi (天知 茂, Amachi Shigeru; 4 March 1931 – 27 July 1985) was a Japanese actor. He appeared in more than 120 films from 1953 to 1984.

== Career ==
Amachi joined the Shintoho studio as one of its "New Face" actors of 1951 and established himself in action and jidaigeki films. He gained fame for the nihilistic mood of his character in Akatsuki no hijōsen and starred in Nobuo Nakagawa's version of Tokaido Yotsuya kaidan (1959). On television, he played the hardboiled detective in Hijō no raisensu and Kogoro Akechi in a long-running series of TV specials. On stage he was best known for playing Hishakaku in Jinsei gekijō.

== Selected filmography ==
Year	Title	Role	Notes
1956	Revenge of the Pearl Queen		
1956	Fearful Attack of the Flying Saucers	Assistant Osugi	
1957	Kenpei to Barabara Shibijin		
1957	Nude Actress Murder Case: Five Criminals		
1958	Kenpei to Yurei		
1959	Tokaido Yotsuya kaidan	Tamiya Iemon	
1959	Onna kyuketsuki		
1960	Black Line	Kôji Machida	
1960	Girls Without Return Tickets		
1960	Yellow Line	The Gangster	
1960	Jigoku	Shirô Shimizu	
1960	Queen Bee and the School for Dragons	Komagata	
1962	The Tale of Zatoichi	Hirate Miki	
1966	Zatoichi's Vengeance		
1968	Blackmail Is My Life		
1980	The Battle of Port Arthur	Kaneko Kentarō	
1983	The Beast and the Magic Sword	Kian	Final film role
