= Kaidan Kasane-ga-fuchi =

- Japanese movie poster
- Directed by: Nobuo Nakagawa
- Written by: Yasunori Kawauchi
- Produced by: Mitsugu Okura
- Starring: Tetsurō Tamba; Katsuko Wakasugi; Takashi Wada
- Cinematography: Yoshimi Hirano
- Music by: Chumei Watanabe
- Distributed by: Shintoho
- Release date: July 10, 1957 (Japan)
- Running time: 57 minutes
- Country: Japan
- Language: Japanese

Kaidan Kasane-ga-fuchi (Japanese: 怪談累が渕, Hepburn: Kaidan Kasane-ga-fuchi; lit. Ghost Story of Kasane Swamp), also known as The Depths or The Ghost of Kasane, is a 1957 black-and-white/Scope Japanese horror film directed by Nobuo Nakagawa for Shintoho Films. The screenplay was based on a story called Shinkei Kasanegafuchi by Encho Sanyutei. The film was never dubbed in English and is only available in subtitled format. It was a short film, running 57 minutes.

Daiei Film remade this film twice, once in 1960 (B&W/full screen) as Kaidan Kasane-ga-fuchi, and again in 1970 (Color/Scope) as The Masseur's Curse (both directed by Kimiyoshi Yasuda). The 1960 version was never shown in the United States, nor was it dubbed in English.

== Cast ==
- Tetsurō Tamba
- Katsuko Wakasugi
- Takashi Wada
- Noriko Kitazawa
- Kikuko Hanaoka
