= Kaidan botan dōrō =

Japanese story

Kaidan Botan Dōrō (怪談牡丹燈籠) (Peony lantern kaidan) is a story inspired by the Chinese influenced kaidan Botan Dōrō. Published as a stenography narrated and created by the rakugo artist San'yūtei Enchō and written with the aid of both Sakai Shōzō (酒井昇造) and Wakabayashi Kanzō (若林玵蔵). Published in 1886, it is considered a famous kaidan in Japan.

== Content and style ==
Kaidan Botan Dōrō is inspired by the Chinese influenced Botan dōrō, a story in which a young man falls in love with the spirit of a beautiful young woman. Nevertheless, San'yūtei's telling of the popular myth also tells the novel story of a young shoeman, Kōsuke, and his quest to avenge his deceased master. This adds a new story to the Botan dōrō myth and develops the relationships with the main characters. The book contains twenty-one chapters and a final chapter. Written in a vernacular Japanese, Kaidan Botan Dōrō is one of the first books written in the unified language or Ichitai genbun, a free speech style resembling the spoken language of the time (Meiji era).

== Publication and influence ==
The book was first serialised in a newspaper and published every Sunday. It has also contributed to the success of publishing stenographies during the Meiji era. Kaidan Botan Dōrō has had a notable influence on consequent versions, which are usually loosely based in San'yūtei's version of the story, including most theatre and cinematographic productions of the myth.

== The stories ==
- The book can be divided into three main parts: the Tale of Kōsuke and his master Iijima, Shinzaburō and his ghost lover O-Tsuyu, and Kōsuke's revenge. The two first parts take place during the sixteen first chapters. Chapters seventeen through twenty-one tell the story of Kōsuke's revenge.

The sixteen first chapters are divided between two groups: odd chapters (Kōsuke and Iijima) and even chapters (Shinzaburō and O-Tsuyu).

- Chapters 1, 3, 5, 7, 9, 11, 13, and 15 explain how Iijima Heizaemon, a notable hatamoto, killed a drunken samurai and how eighteen years later, the latter's son, Kōsuke, became Iijima's servant. Iijima is fooled by his wife, O-Kuni, who cheats on him with Iijima's nephew Genjirō and the adulterers plan to kill the master. However, the hatamoto is killed in an accident and Kōsuke swears revenge. O-Kuni and her lover eventually flee the house of Iijima.
- Chapters 2, 4, 6, 8, 10, 12, 14, 16 explain how Shinzaburō, a charming young man, meets Iijima's only daughter O-Tsuyu. They fall in love with each other but social class prevents them from being together. O-Tsuyu dies longing for the young man and returns during the Festival of spirits (O-Bon), to visit her lover. Shinzaburō's neighbours and servants, Tomozō and his wife O-Mine, learn of the young man's misfortune but in the end help the spirit consume Shinzaburō's soul in exchange for money. Tomozō and his wife then flee the neighbourhood.

All chapters after 17 explain how in a twist of events, Tomozō meets O-Kuni and both start a love affair resulting in the murder of Tomozō's wife. O-Kuni is finally faced with Kōsuke and Tomozō is arrested for his wife's murder. In the final chapters Kōsuke meets his mother who left him alone as a child.

== Translations ==
Although not a direct translation, the tale of Shinzaburō and his ghost lover O-Tsuyu are closely retold in Lafcadio Hearn's In Ghostly Japan (1899), section A Passional Karma. Other languages: A Russian translation exists under the title Пионовый фонарь (Peony lantern), an Italian translation exists under the title La lanterna delle peonie (Lantern of Peonies), and a French translation exists under the title Kaidan Botan Doro ou le conte etrange d'une lanterne pivoine (Kaidan Botan Doro or the strange tale of a peony lantern).
