= Kurama Tengu ōedo ihen =

Kurama Tengu ōedo ihen 鞍馬天狗 大江戸異変
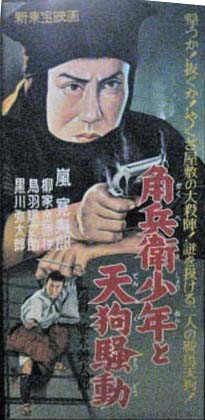
- Japanese movie pre-release poster with alternate title 角兵衛少年と天狗騒動.
- Directed by: Kyōtarō Namiki
- Screenplay by: Kyōtarō Namiki; Shōjirō Tomoda
- Story by: Jirō Osaragi
- Produced by: Ryō Takei
- Starring: Kanjūrō Arashi; Yatarō Kurokawa; Akiko Sawamura; Nijiko Kiyokawa; Kingorō Yanagiya
- Cinematography: Kikuzō Kawasaki
- Edited by: Hidetoshi Kasama
- Music by: Seiichi Suzuki
- Production company: Shintoho
- Release date: August 13, 1950 (Japan)
- Running time: 102 minutes
- Country: Japan
- Language: Japanese

Kurama Tengu ōedo ihen (Japanese: 鞍馬天狗 大江戸異変) is a 1950 black and white Japanese film directed by Kyōtarō Namiki and produced by Shintoho.

== Cast ==
- Kanjūrō Arashi (嵐寛寿郎)
- Yatarō Kurokawa (黒川弥太郎)
- Akiko Sawamura (沢村晶子)
- Nijiko Kiyokawa (清川虹子)
- Kingorō Yanagiya (柳家金語楼)

== See also ==
- Kurama Tengu, a 1928 silent film
