= Dōtei shain to yoromeki fujin =

Dōtei shain to yoromeki fujin 童貞社員とよろめき夫人
- Directed by: Haku Komori
- Produced by: Shintoho
- Cinematography: 岡戸嘉外
- Music by: Rokurō Hara (原六朗)
- Distributed by: Shintoho
- Release date: 18 January 1958
- Running time: 74 minutes
- Country: Japan
- Language: Japanese

Dōtei shain to yoromeki fujin (童貞社員とよろめき夫人, Mrs. Stagger and the new employees) is a 1958 black-and-white Japanese film directed by Haku Komori and produced by Shintoho.

== Cast ==
- Shōji Nakayama (中山昭二)
- 小畑絹子
- 荒川さつき
- 小倉繁
- 小川虎之助
