= Kurama Tengu (film) =

- Film poster
- Directed by: Teppei Yamaguchi
- Screenplay by: Fujio Kimura
- Story by: Jirō Osaragi
- Starring: Kanjuro Arashi; Takesaburo Nakamura; Reizaburo Yamamoto; Tokusho Arashi
- Narrated by: Shunsui Matsuda; Midori Sawato
- Cinematography: Tōkitsu Ishikawa; Jūzō Tanaka
- Production company: Arakan Production
- Distributed by: Digital Meme
- Release date: 11 July 1928 (Japan)
- Running time: 71 minutes
- Country: Japan
- Language: Silent (Japanese intertitles)

Kurama Tengu (Japanese: 鞍馬天狗) is a fictional character in Japanese literature, cinema and TV. The popular series comprises numerous films and television dramas based on the original novel written by Jirō Osaragi.

The 1928 black and white Japanese silent film version with benshi accompaniment was directed by Teppei Yamaguchi. It is a film which is a part of the series depicting the bold and daring hero Kurama Tengu.

== Television ==
- Krama Tengu (1969–70) on NHK played by Hideki Takahashi
- Kurama Tengu (1990) played by Yūki Meguro

== See also ==
- Kurama Tengu: Kyōfu Jidai
- Kurama Tengu ōedo ihen, a 1950 film
