= Hideji Hōjō =

- 北条 秀司
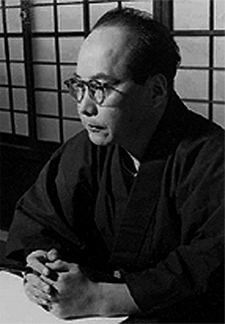
- Hōjō Hideji
- Born: November 7, 1902; Osaka, Japan
- Died: May 19, 1996 (aged 93); Kamakura, Kanagawa, Japan
- Resting place: Ryuho-ji, Kamakura
- Education: Kansai University
- Occupation: Writer
- Writing career
- Genre: stage plays
- Notable awards: Shinchosha Prize (1941); Yomiuri Literary Award (1965); Kikuchi Kan Prize (1973); Otami Keijiro Prize (1987)
- Literary movement: Shinpa

Hideji Hōjō (北条 秀司, Hōjō Hideji; November 7, 1902 – May 19, 1996) was the pen name of a Japanese author, novelist, and playwright in Shōwa period Japan. His real name was Iino Hideji (飯野 秀二).

== Biography ==
Born in Osaka and a graduate of Kansai University, Hōjō moved to Tokyo in 1926 and found employment with the Hakone Tozan Railway. In 1933, he quit his job to devote his attention to drama, becoming a student with Okamoto Kido and Hasegawa Shin. He became a leading member of the shinpa modern drama movement in the 1930s.

During World War II, he was active in writing kokumingeki (government propaganda plays) such as Tamna Tunnel, intended to help the war effort.

Hōjō was author of more than 200 plays and the leader of commercial theatre in Japan after World War II, working in a wide range of genres, from kabuki, to shinpa and Takarazuka Revues. In Behind the Flower Garden in 1960, he wrote a play in which actor Shotaro Hanayagi had to play both the male and female leads.

His psychological dramas about average citizens appealed to mainstream audiences. He is especially known for his screenplay adaptations of Miyamoto Musashi, Genji Monogatari, and many other historical dramas.

Hōjō was awarded numerous literary awards in his career, including the Shinchosha Prize, the Yomiuri Literary Award and the Kikuchi Kan Prize. In 1987, he was designated a Person of Cultural Merit by the Japanese government.

His grave is at the temple Ryuho-ji in Ofuna, Kamakura, where he lived for many years.

== Filmography ==
- Koi sugata kitsune goten (恋すがた狐御殿) (1956), writer

== See also ==
- Japanese literature
- List of Japanese authors

== Notes ==
- Hojo Hideji at IMDb
