= Koi Sugata Kitsune Goten =

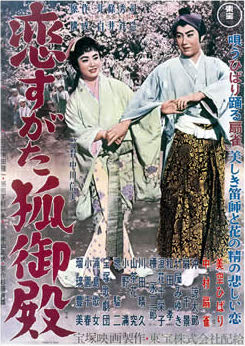
- Original Japanese movie poster
- Directed by: Nobuo Nakagawa
- Written by: Hideji Hōjō (writer); Ryozo Kasahara (writer)
- Produced by: Sadao Sugihara
- Cinematography: Kozo Okazaki
- Music by: Masao Yoneyama
- Production company: Takarazuka Eiga Company Ltd.
- Distributed by: Toho
- Release date: May 17, 1956 (Japan)
- Running time: 90 minutes
- Country: Japan
- Language: Japanese

Koi Sugata Kitsune Goten (Japanese: 恋すがた狐御殿), also known as In Love with a Heavenly Fox, is a 1956 black and white Japanese film directed by Nobuo Nakagawa.

== Cast ==
- Hibari Misora as Maruya / Tomone
- Haruhisa Kawada as Akinobu
- Senjaku Nakamura
- Chieko Naniwa as Okon
- Chikage Oogi as Akemi
- Shunji Sakai as Heihachi
- Kyu Sazanka as Fujimaru
- Eijirō Yanagi
