= San'yūtei Enchō =

Japanese author and rakugo performer

- 初代 三遊亭 圓朝(円朝)
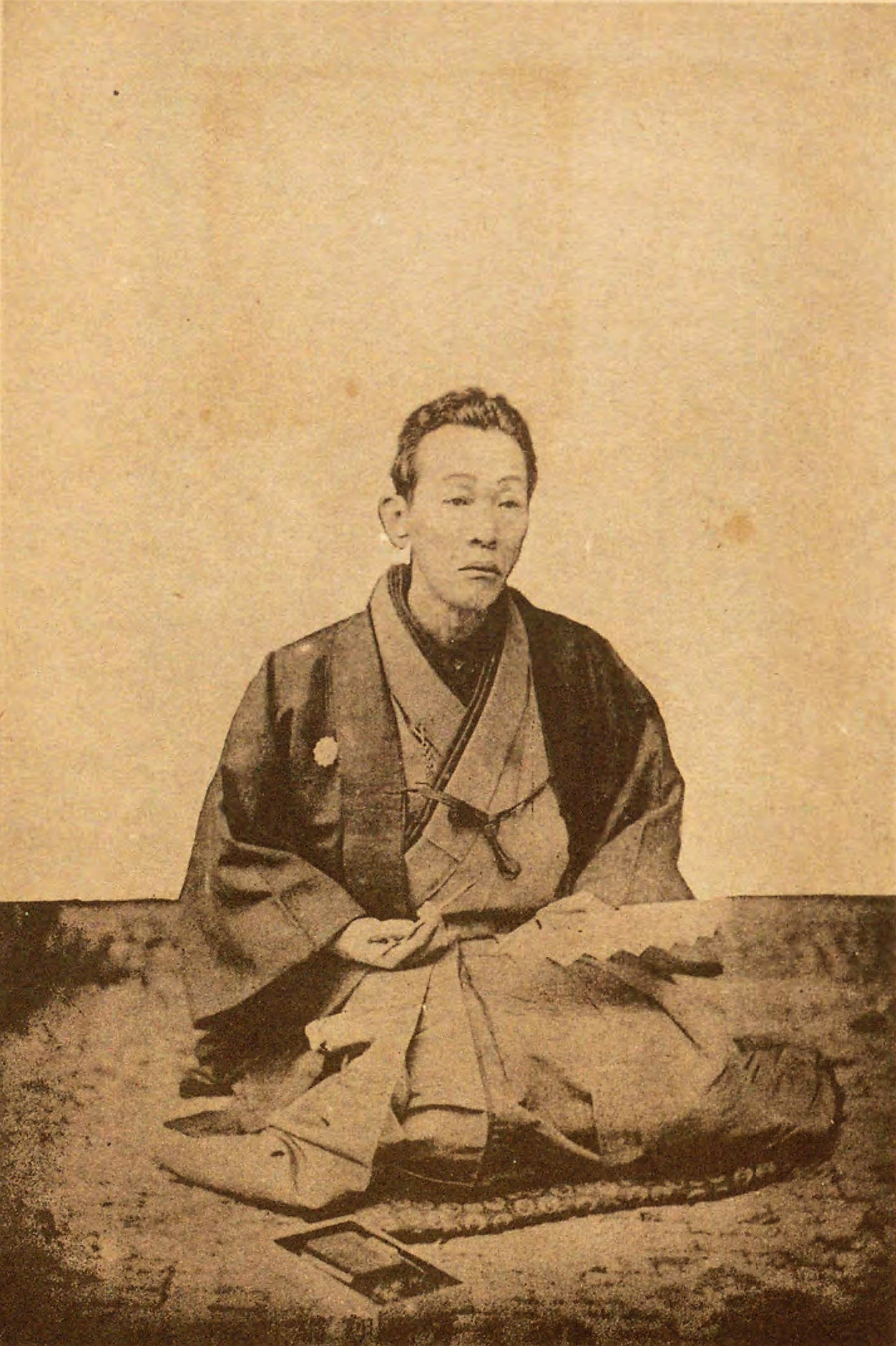
- Born: Jirokichi Izubuchi; May 13, 1839; Japan
- Died: August 11, 1900 (aged 61)
- Occupations: Author and rakugo performer
- Writing career
- Period: Late Edo and early Meiji
- Notable work: Kaidan botan dōrō

Sanyutei Encho I (初代 三遊亭 円朝, Shodai San'yūtei Enchō; Japanese pronunciation: [saɰ̃.jɯː.tei (|) eɲ.tɕoꜜː, -teː-], May 13, 1839 – August 11, 1900), born Jirokichi Izubuchi (出淵 次郎吉, Izubuchi Jirokichi), was a Japanese author and rakugo performer of the late Edo and early Meiji eras. He was the founder and head of the Sanyuu school of rakugo, and is considered a pioneer of the rakugo revival.

Notable works of his include Japanese horror ("kaidan") classics: Kaidan botan dōrō (based on Botan Dōrō (牡丹灯籠, The Peony Lantern), and Shinkei Kasane ga fuchi (on which many Japanese horror films such as Kaidan Kasane-ga-fuchi are based).

== Career ==
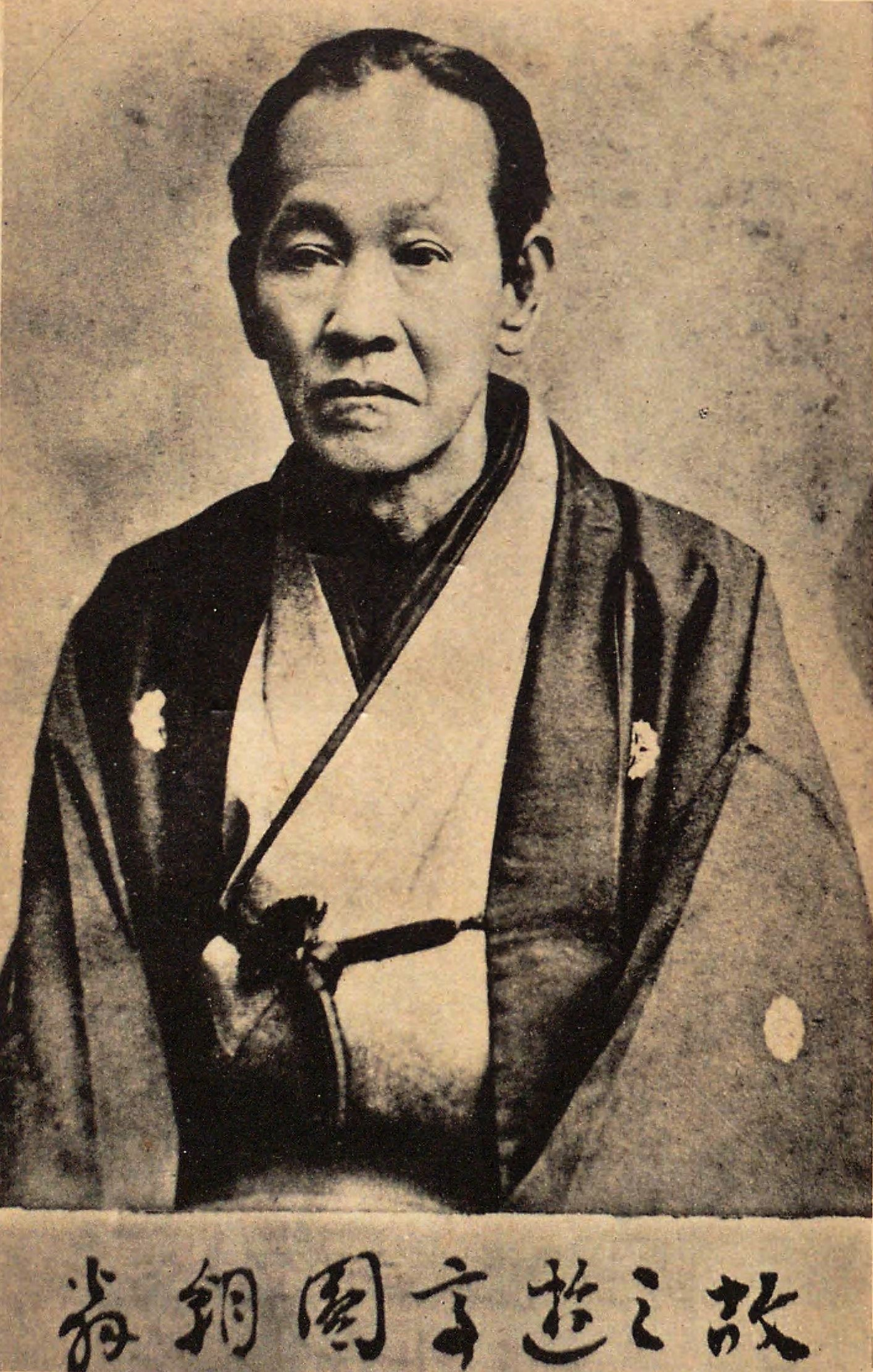
San'yūtei Enchō

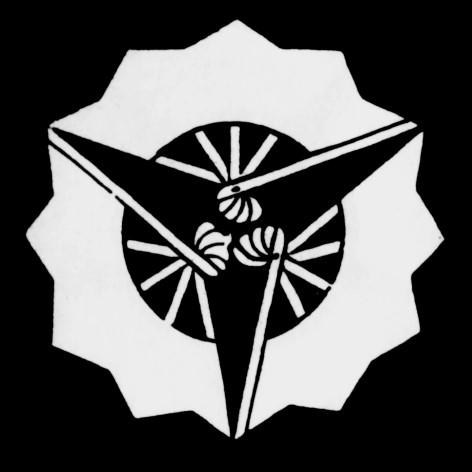
San'yūtei Enchō family crest, a Takasaki folding fan

As a rakugoka, San'yūtei Enchō differed from the predominantly comedic style of storytelling of his predecessors in favor of a more serious approach, his school coming closer to Kōdan in methodology. In addition to this, his school worked to implement use of subtle background instrumentation and altered stage lighting to accompany his ghost stories, elements that have become more standard today. One of his most well known instances of this would be during performances of Shinkei Kasane ga fuchi.

Some of San'yūtei Enchō's peers would at times perform their own versions beforehand of stories he was expected to, in an attempt to undermine his performances. San'yūtei Enshō would act as one such rival. Despite this, San'yūtei Enchō felt that the manner in which he told stories could not be replicated by anyone else, bearing many traits unique to himself. In addition, he would work to create many new pieces of his own that nobody had seen before.
