= Fearful Attack of the Flying Saucers =

Japanese name
- Kanji: 空飛ぶ円盤恐怖の襲撃
Transcriptions
- Revised Hepburn: Soratobu Enban Kyōfu no Shūgeki
- Directed by: Shinichi Sekizawa
- Screenplay by: Shinichi Sekizawa
- Starring: Tadao Takashima; Junko Ebata; Taiji Tonoyama; Hiroshi Sugi; Shigeru Amachi; Junji Masuda
- Cinematography: Sadao Uemura
- Music by: Satoshi Kusagawa
- Production company: Kokumotsu Films
- Distributed by: Shintoho
- Release date: November 7, 1956 (Japan)
- Running time: 79 minutes
- Country: Japan
- Language: Japanese

Fearful Attack of the Flying Saucers (Japanese: 空飛ぶ円盤恐怖の襲撃, Hepburn: Soratobu Enban Kyōfu no Shūgeki) is a 1956 independent Japanese tokusatsu science fiction film directed and written by Shinichi Sekizawa, with special effects and cinematography by Sadao Uemura. Produced by Kokumotsu Films and distributed by Shintoho, it is Sekizawa's sole directorial credit and stars Tadao Takashima, Junko Ebata, Taiji Tonoyama, Hiroshi Sugi, Shigeru Amachi, and Junji Masuda. In the film, a group of Japanese scientists deal with a sudden alien invasion by inventing a rocket in order to save the planet.

Fearful Attack of the Flying Saucers was released nationwide in Japan by Shintoho on November 7, 1956. After its release, it was considered lost until a 16mm cut was found in 2010 and sold for auction online for ¥2.1 million. Plans were made for a DVD release following the auction, though they have yet to materialize.

== Plot ==
While tensions between the United States and the Soviet Union's nuclear tests cause severe neuroticism in Japan, alleged sightings of flying saucers wreaking havoc occur in New York City, London, and Hong Kong but are deemed merely hallucinations by officials. The following day, the Dai Tōkyō Shinpō reported that a flying saucer was recently spotted over the skies of Tokyo. The Defense Agency holds a meeting with Dr. Hiroto Otsuki, and Dr. Kuroi of the Nuclear Research Institute on defensive measures against the flying saucers that cause devastating destruction using their ray weapons.

Dai Tōkyō Shinpō reporter Masao Hayashi questions Dr. Otsuki regarding efforts to defeat the saucers. During his interview, Otsuki reveals that a new metal that is capable of withstanding the flying saucer's rays is nearing completion. The following morning, the Japan Self-Defense Forces surround a saucer that has materialized above Akasaka's television tower. After an alien robot named Dulles emerges from the saucer, jets attempt an aerial assault on the flying saucer but are obliterated by its ray. Several flying saucers then proceed to eradicate Tokyo's prominent institutes. Fortunately, the group of human scientists decodes the language spoken by Dulles before the M87 Nebula aliens destroyed the city's landmarks.

Dr. Hoshina, a paralyzed space scientist who was tortured because he refused to collaborate with the army during World War II, concludes that the scientists must construct a rocket to combat the aliens or the saucers will destroy civilization and the planet. Hence, the scientists secretly build the R-1 Rocket underwater off the west coast of Izu in an underground hangar. One day, the aliens discover the secret location and try to destroy their threat, the R-1 prior to its completion. The group attempts to defend the rocket by using guided missiles, which, despite not having any effect on the flying saucer, causes it to fly away. Shortly thereafter, Kaoru Hoshina, Dr. Otsuki's secretary, is assailed by an alien robot that rises from the sea while embracing her boyfriend, Hayashi, on a beach at night.

The aliens commence their counterattack, creating a chaotic scene on the land, but fortunately, the R-1 Rocket is ultimately launched to save humanity and defeat the alien's flying saucers. While running the R-1 operation, Dr. Hoshina faints after being assailed by an alien robot in the laboratory. The R-1 Rocket uses its XQ Proton Destruction Cannon to obliterate the flying saucers, saving the planet.

== Cast ==
- Tadao Takashima as Masao Hayashi, reporter for the Dai Tōkyō Shinpō
- Junko Ebata as Kaoru Hoshina, Dr. Hiroto Otsuki's secretary and Hayashi's lover
- Taiji Tonoyama as Dr. Hiroto Otsuki, nuclear researcher
- Hiroshi Sugi as Dr. Hoshina, space scientist
- Shigeru Amachi as Assistant Osugi
- Junji Masuda as Dr. Kuroi, nuclear researcher

== Production ==
The film was Shinichi Sekizawa's first and only role as a director after working as an assistant director for Hiroshi Shimizu and its special effects were created by Sadao Uemura and Shigeji Nishitani. (Note: IMDb referred to Yoshiyuki Kuroda as the special effects supervisor.)

== Release ==
Fearful Attack of the Flying Saucers was released nationwide in Japan on November 7, 1956. Following its release, the film was considered lost until a 16mm cut was found in 2010 and sold for auction online for 2.1 million yen. Plans were made for a DVD release following the auction, though they have yet to materialize.

== See also ==
- Earth vs. the Flying Saucers
