= Kenpei to Barabara Shibijin =

- Film poster
- Directed by: Kyotaro Namiki
- Screenplay by: Akira Sugimoto
- Based on: Notautsu Kanpei by Keisuke Kosaka
- Starring: Shōji Nakayama; Shigeru Amachi; Shuntaro Emi; Mie Akiko
- Cinematography: Shin Yamanaka
- Music by: Masao Yoneyama
- Distributed by: Shintoho
- Release date: August 6, 1957 (Japan)
- Running time: 73 minutes
- Country: Japan
- Language: Japanese

Kenpei to Barabara Shibijin (Japanese: 憲兵とバラバラ死美人; lit. "The Military Policeman and the Dismembered Beauty") is a 1957 black-and-white Japanese thriller film directed by Kyotaro Namiki and written by Akira Sugimoto, based on the book Notautsu Kanpei by Japanese military officer Keisuke Kosaka.

== Plot ==
In October 1937, after the Sendai Infantry Fourth Regiment’s main combat units had been deployed to Manchuria, a decomposed female corpse, missing the head and all four limbs, and pregnant with a five-month-old child, was discovered in a well near the kitchen area of the regiment's barracks. The Kempeitai were stunned by this unprecedented scandal, especially given its occurrence in a restricted area of a military installation. Anticipating that the investigation would face significant difficulties, they dispatched Sergeant Kosaka, a highly skilled Kempeitai officer from Tokyo, to resolve the case.

Despite the non-cooperation of the Sendai Kempeitai, who felt their honor had been tarnished by his arrival in that city, Kosaka proceeded by collaborating with the civilian police. The first suspect to emerge was Sergeant Tsuneyoshi, who had been serving as the kitchen squad leader at the time. He was a handsome man known for his intense involvement with women, and a barmaid named Fumiko with whom he was intimately acquainted had gone missing. This latter fact is what caused him to be named prime suspect, though it would turn out to be a red herring.

Later, Sergeant Kosaka visited Tohoku Imperial University to gather materials and learned there that the torso of the murdered woman had weighed approximately 30 kilograms (≈ 66 lb), making it impossible for a single person to carry alone, and that dismembering a corpse would require at least one hour even with a sharp blade. Advancing his reasoning, he focused his attention on the operating room of the Army hospital adjacent to the regiment. His reasoning was proven correct when both hands and both feet were discovered in an old well beside the hospital’s morgue.

The Sendai Kempeitai had already concluded that Tsuneyoshi was the perpetrator and subjected him to intense daily torture in an effort to force a confession. However, Sergeant Kosaka believed the real culprit was someone else. Upon further investigation, it was revealed that before the deployment to Manchuria, four non-commissioned officers had been dispatched daily from the regiment to the hospital. When their subordinates were questioned and the circumstances at the time were thoroughly examined, it emerged that one of the officers, Sergeant Kimizuka, had transported personal items wrapped in blankets and a tarpaulin from the operating room, along with a heavily packaged load, back to the regiment. Furthermore, from the dental caries in the murdered woman’s skull, it was determined that she was Yuriko Ito, a maidservant employed by the prefectural accounting director, and that she had been in an intimate relationship with Kimizuka.

Thus, the case took a sudden and decisive resolution. Sergeant Kosaka succeeded in arresting Kimizuka, who had deserted from his original unit in Manchuria and was hiding in a settlement.

== Cast ==
- Shōji Nakayama as Sergeant Kosaka
- Shigeru Amachi as Sergeant Tsuneyoshi
- Shuntaro Emi as Sergeant Kimizuka
- Mie Akiko as Yuriko Ito

== Legacy ==
The film is best known for its association with the SNES game EarthBound. Its creator, Shigesato Itoi, accidentally walked in on the film as a child and mistook a murder scene for a rape scene, which traumatized him and inspired the eerie dialogue during the game's final boss battle with Giygas.
