= Kanjūrō Arashi =

Japanese actor (1903–1980)

- 嵐 寛壽郎 あらし かんじゅうろう
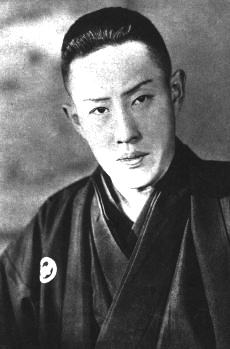
- Kanjūrō Arashi in 1930s or in 1940s.
- Born: Shoichi Takahashi; December 8, 1902; Kiyamachi Street, Kyoto, Empire of Japan
- Died: October 21, 1980 (aged 77); Kyoto, Japan
- Other names: Tokutaro Arashi; Wakadayu Arashi; Chozaburo Arashi
- Occupation: Actor
- Years active: 1919–1980
- Style: Kabuki, drama
- Relatives: Mitsuko Mori (cousin)
- Awards: Japan Academy Film Prize, Best Supporting Actor, 1979; Mainichi Film Awards, Best Supporting Actor, 1968 (for Profound Desires of the Gods); Shōzō Makino Award, 1974

Kanjūrō Arashi (嵐 寛壽郎, Arashi Kanjūrō; 8 December 1903 – 21 October 1980) was a Japanese film actor. His nickname was "Arakan." He is famous for playing the role of Kurama Tengu series. He entered the film industry in 1927 and came to fame playing Kurama Tengu, a character in the Bakumatsu era created by Jirō Osaragi in his novels. In the 1950s he portrayed the Emperor Meiji in several hit films and appeared in yakuza films in the 1960s. He won Mainichi Film Award for Best Supporting Actor award for his role in The Profound Desire of the Gods.

== Filmography ==
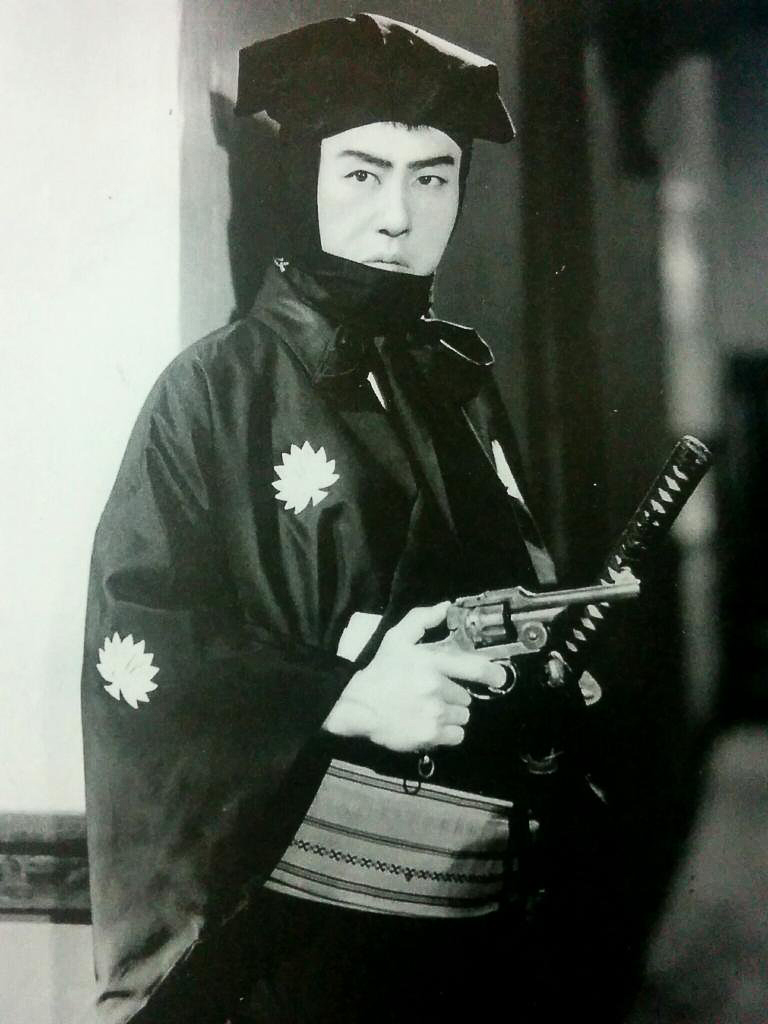
Kanjūrō Arashi as Kurama Tengu

His filmography includes over 300 films:

- Kurama Tengu (鞍馬天狗, Kurama Tengu) (1928)
- Kurama Tengu: Kyōfu Jidai (鞍馬天狗 恐怖時代, The Frightful Era of Kurama Tengu) (1928)
- Kurama Tengu ōedo ihen (鞍馬天狗 大江戸異変 ) (1950)
- Emperor Meiji and the Great Russo-Japanese War (明治天皇と日露大戦争) (1957)
- Kyōen Kobanzame (侠艶小判鮫, Kyōen Kobanzame) (1958)
- Jigoku (1960)
- Hana no Shōgai (1963, TV series)
- 13 Assassins (1963) as Kuranaga
- Akō Rōshi (1964, TV series)
- Abashiri Prison (網走番外地, Abashiri Bangaichi) (1965)
- A Colt Is My Passport (1967) as Shimazu
- The Profound Desire of the Gods (神々の深き欲望, Kamigami no Fukaki Yokubo) (1968)
- Higashi Shinakai (1968)
- Soshiki Bōryoku Kyodai Sakazuki (1969)
- Zatoichi Meets Yojimbo (1970)
- Oshizamurai Kiichihōgan (1973–74)
- The Executioner II: Karate Inferno (1974)
- Tora-san Meets His Lordship (1977)
- Shin Hissatsu Shiokinin (1977 television series) (ep. 11)
- Orenji Rodo kyūkō (1978)
- Nichiren (1979)

== Bibliography ==
- Takenaka, Rō (1976). Kurama tengu no ojisan wa: kikigaki Arakan ichi-dai. Shirakawa Shoin. OCLC 30581099.
