= Profound Desires of the Gods =

- DVD release of Profound Desires of the Gods (1968)
- Directed by: Shōhei Imamura
- Written by: Keiji Hasebe; Shohei Imamura
- Produced by: Masanori Yamanoi
- Starring: Rentarō Mikuni; Chōichirō Kawarazaki; Kazuo Kitamura; Hideko Okiyama; Yoshi Katō; Yasuko Matsui; Kanjūrō Arashi
- Cinematography: Masao Tochizawa
- Edited by: Matsuo Tanji
- Music by: Toshiro Mayuzumi
- Distributed by: Nikkatsu Corporation, Toho International Company Inc. (USA, 1970), East West Classics (USA, 1988)
- Release date: November 22, 1968 (Japan)
- Running time: 172 minutes
- Country: Japan
- Language: Japanese

Profound Desires of the Gods or Deep Desires of Gods or Kuragejima – Legends from a Southern Island (Japanese: 神々の深き欲望, Hepburn: Kamigami no Fukaki Yokubō) is a 1968 Japanese film by director Shōhei Imamura. The culmination of the director's examinations of the fringes of Japanese society throughout the 1960s, the film was an 18-month super-production which failed to make an impression at the time of its release, but has since risen in stature.

== Plot ==
Presenting a vast chronicle of life on the remote Kurage Island, the film centres on the disgraced, superstitious, inbred Futori family and the Tokyo engineer sent to supervise the creation of a new well for a sugar mill on the island – an encounter which leads to both conflict and complicity in strange and powerful ways.

== Cast ==
- Kazuo Kitamura as Engineer Kariya, a modern-day married man from Tokyo who gets entangled in the Futori family. Kariya is sent to Kurage Island by his boss at the sugar cane corporation to find a water source for a sugar mill on the island. Eventually he is seduced by Toriko.
- Kanjūrō Arashi as Yamamori Futori, the patriarch of the Futori family.
- Rentarō Mikuni as Nekichi Futori, Yamamori's son conceived through an incestuous relationship between Yamamori and a deceased older sister. He lusts after his sister Uma. Disfavored and condemned, his punishment is being chained in a pit beneath a boulder and tasked to loosen it in order to appease the island gods. Once the boulder is loosened, it can unblock a freshwater stream for the island's rice fields.
- Yasuko Matsui as Uma Futori, the noro (shaman) daughter of Yamamori who works at a nearby sacred shrine with the only source of good water. Uma is in love with her brother Nekichi, but is hesitant to consummate their relationship because she does not want a taboo relationship to make Nekichi even more hated by the other islanders.
- Hideko Okiyama as Toriko Futori, the mentally disabled daughter of Nekichi. She is known for her sexual promiscuity and volatile behavior.
- Chōichirō Kawarazaki as Kametaro Futori, the son of Nekichi. Kametaro dreams of the day he can leave behind the island and his complicated family. Kariya encourages Kametaro's ambition to get him to help drill a well for the sugar mill.
- Yoshi Katō as Ritsugen Ryu, one of the leaders of the island and manager of the sugar mill. He serves as the island's representative when dealing with the sugar cane corporation. He has a sexual relationship with Uma, and often abuses her physically and sexually. Manipulative, corrupted, and greedy, Ryu hypocritically positions himself as a defender of his people's traditional ways of life, but secretly works to exploit them for his own advantage. He uses his position as the shaman's lover to make himself untouchable, forcing Uma to falsify prophecies that will benefit him.
- Hôsei Komatsu
- Chikako Hosokawa
- Jun Hamamura
- Chikage Oogi (special appearance)

== Awards ==
The film was Japan's submission to the 42nd Academy Awards for the Academy Award for Best Foreign Language Film, but was not accepted as a nominee.

- Kinema Junpo Award (1969): Best Director
- Best Film; Mainichi Film Concours (1969): Best Film, Best Screenplay, Best Supporting Actor (Kanjūrō Arashi)

== See also ==
- List of submissions to the 42nd Academy Awards for Best Foreign Language Film
- List of Japanese submissions for the Academy Award for Best Foreign Language Film
