= Kenpei to Yūrei =

- Japanese movie poster
- Directed by: Nobuo Nakagawa
- Written by: Yoshihiro Ishikawa (writer)
- Starring: Shōji Nakayama; Naoko Kubo; Shigeru Amachi; Akira Nakamura; Yōko Mihara
- Cinematography: Tadashi Nishimoto
- Edited by: Toshio Goto
- Music by: Yoshi Eguchi
- Distributed by: Shintoho
- Release date: August 10, 1958 (Japan)
- Running time: 75 minutes
- Country: Japan
- Language: Japanese

Kenpei to Yūrei (Japanese: 憲兵と幽霊; lit. "Military Police and Ghost"), also known as Ghost in the Regiment, is a 1958 black-and-white Japanese horror film directed by Nobuo Nakagawa.

== Cast ==
- Shōji Nakayama
- Naoko Kubo
- Shigeru Amachi
- Akira Nakamura
- Yōko Mihara
- Fumiko Miyata
- Shin Shibata
- Nagamasa Yamada
