= The Ghost Cat of Otama Pond =

1960 Japanese horror film

- Theatrical release poster
- Directed by: Yoshihiro Ishikawa
- Written by: Yoshihiro Ishikawa; Jiro Fujishima
- Starring: Shōzaburō Date; Noriko Kitazawa; Yōichi Numata; Namiji Matsuura
- Production company: Shintoho
- Release date: 1960
- Running time: 75 minutes
- Country: Japan
- Language: Japanese

The Ghost Cat of Otama Pond (Japanese: 怪猫 お玉が池, Hepburn: Kaibyō Otama-ga-ike) is a 1960 Japanese horror film directed and co-written by Yoshihiro Ishikawa, in his directorial debut. Produced by Shintoho, it belongs to the subgenre of "ghost cat" films (kaibyō eiga or bake neko mono), featuring a cat-like supernatural entity.

== Cast ==
- Shōzaburō Date
- Noriko Kitazawa
- Yōichi Numata
- Namiji Matsuura
