= Takarazuka Eiga =

Japanese film production company

Takarazuka Eizo Co. Ltd. (宝塚映像株式会社), shorter name is Takarazuka Films (宝塚映画, Takarazuka Eiga), is a film production company. The headquarters is in Hyōgo Prefecture, Japan.

Takarazuka Eizo produces films from Takarazuka Revue musical theater, which is inside the building Tokyo Takarazuka Theater now.

Takarazuka Eizo Co. Ltd. is a part of Hankyu Hanshin Toho Group and its film distributor is Toho.

== Filmography ==
Filmography of Takarazuka Eiga as production company include:

- Koi sugata kitsune goten (恋すがた狐御殿 Koi sugata kitsune goten) (1956)
