= Tadao Takashima =

Japanese actor and jazz musician (1930–2019)

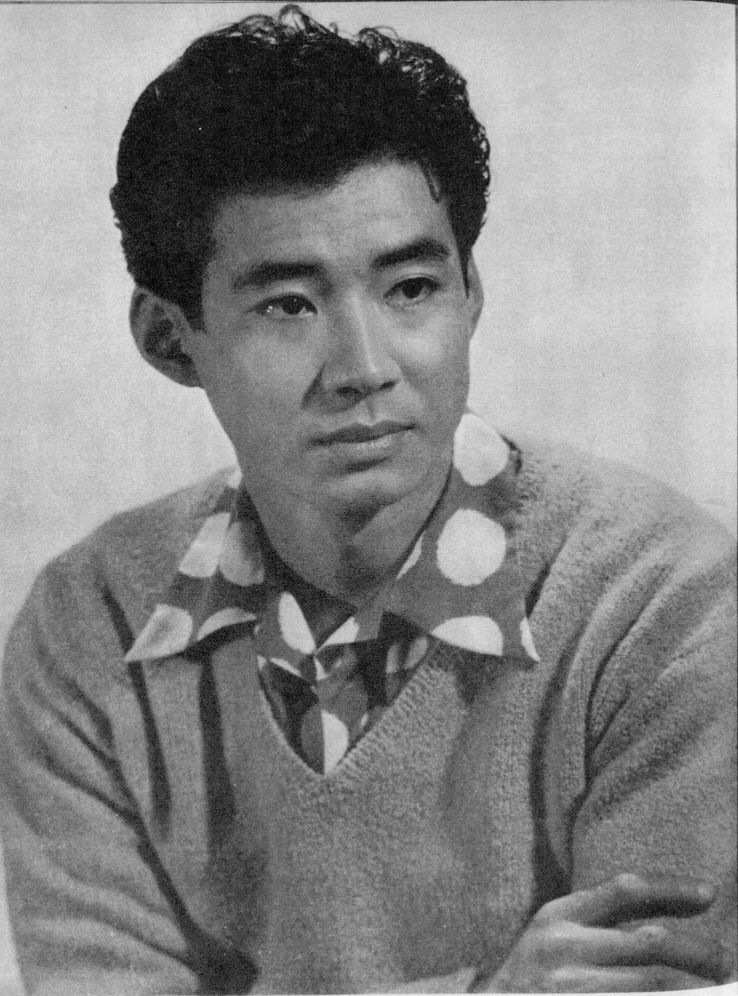
- Tadao Takashima in 1956
- Born: Tadao Takashima (髙嶋忠夫); 27 July 1930; Kobe, Japan
- Died: 26 June 2019 (aged 88); Tokyo, Japan
- Occupations: Actor; Jazz musician
- Years active: 1952–2019
- Spouse: Hanayo Sumi (m. 1963)
- Children: 3; including Masahiro and Masanobu

Tadao Takashima (高島忠夫, Takashima Tadao) (27 July 1930 – 26 June 2019) was a Japanese actor and jazz musician. He appeared in more than 100 films, including the Toho productions King Kong vs. Godzilla, Atragon, and Frankenstein vs. Baragon. He also performed in stage musicals such as My Fair Lady and appeared in several television shows.

== Career ==
Takashima began participating in a jazz band while a student at Kwansei Gakuin University. He left the university before graduating when he joined the Shintoho studio, debuting as an actor in 1952. He starred in the 1962 film King Kong vs. Godzilla alongside Yū Fujiki, and subsequently acted with Fujiki in several comedy films about salarymen, which were popular in Japan at that time. Takashima also appeared in Son of Godzilla and Godzilla vs. Mechagodzilla II.

He gained popularity as a romantic lead who could also sing, which led to roles in stage musicals, including the role of Professor Henry Higgins in a 1963 production of My Fair Lady. He also appeared on several television programs, including the quiz show Quiz! Do-re-mi-fa-don! and the cooking show Gochisosama.

== Personal life ==
In 1963, Takashima married Hanayo Sumi, a former member of Takarazuka Revue. His first-born son was murdered in 1964 at the age of five months by the family maid. He had two other sons, Masahiro Takashima and Masanobu Takashima, both of whom are actors. In 1998, Takashima developed depression, from which he subsequently recovered.

Takashima died of natural causes in his home in Tokyo on 26 June 2019 at age 88.

== Filmography ==
Film
Year	Title	Role	Notes	Ref.
1952	Choito neesan omoide yanagi	Shinichi		
1952	Asakusa yonin shimai			
1953	Onna to iu shiro - Mari no maki			
1953	Onna to iu shiro - Yuko no maki			
1953	Ai no sakyû			
1953	Ajapa tengoku			
1953	Senkan Yamato			
1953	Seishun Jazu Musume	Tahara		
1953	Waga koi no lila no kokage ni			
1954	Musume jûroku jazz matsuri			
1954	Jazz on Parade 1954 nen: Tokyo Cinderella musume			
1955	Santashain no onna hisho			
1956	Hokkai no hanran	First Officer Mori		
1956	Morishige no Shinkonryoko			
1956	Daigaku no buyuden			
1956	Daigaku no kengo keiraku no abarenbo			
1956	Fearful Attack of the Flying Saucers	Masao Hayashi		
1956	Gunshin Yamamoto gensui to Rengô kantai			
1957	Oshaberi shacho			
1957	Nichibei Hanayome Hanamuko Irekae Torikae Gassen	Daikichi Matsukawa		
1957	Emperor Meiji and the Great Russo-Japanese War	Nogi Yasusuke		
1957	Hibari ga oka no taiketsu	Yûkichi Hanayama		
1957	Sen'un Ajia no joô			
1958	Joôbachi no ikari	Singer		
1959	Kakkun chô tokkyû	Shintoyo Eiga Star		
1959	Teisô no Arashi	Minoru Yagihashi		
1959	Bôryoku musume			
1959	Jûdai no magari kado			
1960	Chikateikoku no shikeishitsu			
1960	Arashi o yobu gakudan	Jun Mitani		
1960	Chinpindô shujin			
1960	Bakusho itohan nikki			
1960	Kyôsaitô sôsai ni eikô are	Haruhiko Wakayama		
1960	Kamitsuita wakadan'na			
1960	Taiyô o dake	Takahiko Chiba		
1960	Oneechan ni makashitoki	Matsuzaemon Matsuno		
1960	Gametsui yatsu	Kanta, Shika's son		
1960	Utamatsuri romansu dochu			
1960	Oneechan wa tsuiteru ze	Hikoichi Ôtsu		
1960	Sazae-san to epuron obasan			
1961	Shusse kôsu ni shinro o tore			
1961	Fuku no kami: Sazae-san ikka			
1961	Wakarete ikiru toki mo	Kengo Inami		
1961	Onna kazoku			
1961	Kaei			
1961	Ganba			
1961	Awamori-kun nishi-e iku			
1962	King Kong vs. Godzilla	Osamu Sakurai		
1962	Shin kitsune to tanuki			
1962	Chūshingura: Hana no Maki, Yuki no Maki	Jûjirô Hazama		
1963	Onna ni tsuyoku naru kufû no kazukazu	Gorô Miyake		
1963	Love Me, Love Me	Inspector Ôki		
1963	Hai hai sannin musume			
1963	Nippon jitsuwa jidai			
1963	Ichi ka bachi ka			
1963	Atragon	Susumu Hatanaka		
1964	Hibari, Chiemi, Izumi: Sannin yoreba			
1964	You Can Succeed, Too	Nakai		
1964	Meiji taitei goichidaiki			
1964	Danchi: Nanatsu no taizai	2nd & 7 Sin-Masao Hanai		
1965	Frankenstein vs. Baragon	Dr. Yuzo Kawaji		
1965	Baka to Hasami			
1966	Ja ja umanarashi			
1966	Jinchoge	Minegishi		
1966	Neko no kyujitsu			
1967	Take-chan shacho: Seishun wa ryu no mono da!			
1967	Take-chan shacho: Seishun de tsukkare!			
1967	Son of Godzilla	Dr. Kusumi		
1968	Kamo to negi	Maruki		
1968	Andersen monogatari			
1969	Mito Kômon man'yûki	Kakunojô Atsumi		
1971	Rikugun rakugohei			
1988	Kanashi iro yanen	Sumio		
1993	Godzilla vs. Mechagodzilla II	Chief Hosono		
1994	Onna-zakari	Heigoroh Asaoka		
