= Shōji Nakayama =

Japanese actor (1928–1998)

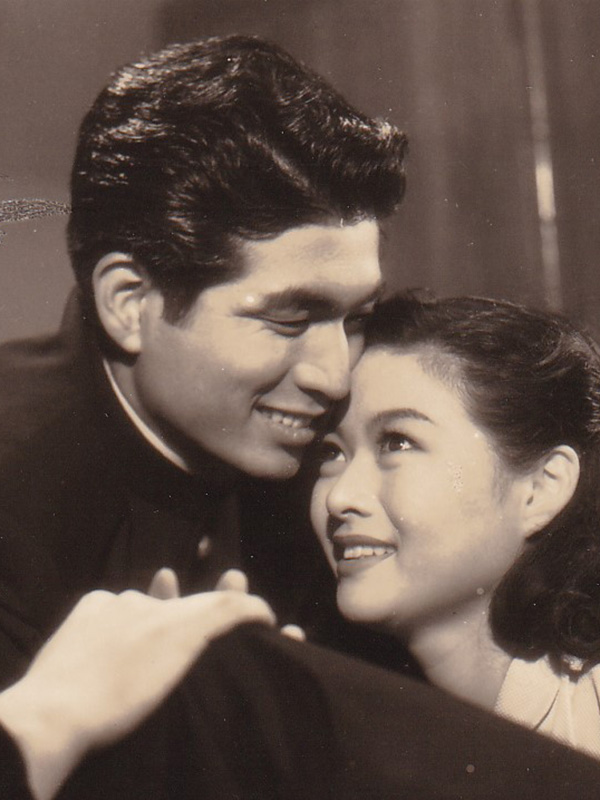
Image of Nobu McCarthy and Shoji Nakayama

Shōji Nakayama (中山 昭二, Nakayama Shōji) (February 26, 1928 – December 1, 1998) was a Japanese film actor.

== Selected filmography ==
- Kenpei (1953)
- Senkan Yamato (1953)
- Anatahan (1953) - Nishio
- Yasen Kangofu (1953) - Nemoto
- Waga koi no lila no kokage ni (1953)
- Nezumi-kozo iro zange tsuki yozakura (1954)
- Jihi shinchô (1954)
- Sensuikan Rogô imada fujôsezu (1954)
- Kimi yue ni (1954)
- Jazz on Parade: Jazz musume kampai! (1955) - Shô-chan
- Akuma no sasayaki (1955) - Tetsuo Hirata
- Osho ichidai (1955) - Matsushima
- Jirô monogatari (1955)
- Aogashima no kodomotachi - Onna kyôshi no kiroku (1955) - Mr. Mori
- Tekketsu no tamashii (1956)
- Onryo sakura dai-sodo (1956) - Hotta Kôzukenosuke Masanobu
- Shin ono ga tsumi (1956)
- Hatoba no Ôja (1956) - Shunsuke Kitamura - Saburô's Friend
- Yôun Satomi kaikyoden (1956) - Inuyama Dôsetsu
- Bôryoku no ôja (1956)
- Bôryokû no geisha (1956)
- Ringu no ôja: Eikô no sekai (1957)
- Dotô no Kyôdai (1957) - Takashi Satomi
- Super Giant (1957) - Okamoto / Detective
- Kenpei to Barabara Shibijin (1957) - Tokusuke Kosaka
- Zoku sûpâ jaiantsu (1957) - Okamoto / Detective
- Sen'un Ajia no Joō (1957)
- Dōtei shain to yoromeki fujin (1958) - Daisaku Todoroki
- Joôbachi (1958) - Syunsuke Yuri
- Taiyô musume to shachô-zoku (1958) - Hiroshi Taguchi
- Zekkai no rajo (1958)
- Kenpei to Yurei (1958)
- Nude model satsujin jiken (1958)
- Ningyô Sashichi torimonochô: Koshimoto Irezumi Shibijin (1958) - Sanjûrô Miyabe
- Joôbachi no ikari (1958) - Hiroshi
- Star Dokusatsu Jiken (1958) - Himself (uncredited)
- Satsujinhan Nanatsu no Kao (1959) - Yûji Maki
- Zoku Satsujinhan Nanatsu no Kao: Kaiketsuhen (1959) - Yûji Maki
- Nitôhei monogatari: Banji yôryô no maki (1959)
- Moro no Ichimatsu yûrei dochu (1959)
- Nanatsu no kao no otoko daze (1960)
- Arashi no naka no wakamono tachi (1960)
- Arega minato no hi da (1961)
- Kawa jean blues (1961)
- Furusato wa midori nariki (1961) - Haruo
- Keishichô monogatari: jûni-nin no keiji (1961) - Detective Takayama
- Morgan keibu to nazô no otoko (1961)
- Ni-nirokushiken Daisshutsu (1962)
- Ano sura no hate ni hoshi hama tataku (1962)
- Hachi gatsu jûgo-nichi no dôran (1962)
- Rikugun zangyaku monogatari (1963)
- Waga kyôkatsu no jinsei (1963)
- Meiji taitei goichidaiki (1964)
- Ressha dai shugêki (1964)
- Doro inu (1964)
- Ankokugai gekitotsu sakusen (1965) - Matsuzaki
- Mushuku mono jingi (1965)
- Shôwa zankyô-den (1965)
- Ultraman (1967, TV Series) - Dr. Ninomiya
- Ultra Seven (1967-1968, TV Series) - Captain Kiriyama
- Otoko no shôbu: Niô no irezumi (1967) - Unryû Azumaya
- Hibotan bakuto: Nidaime shûmei (1969)
- Yoru no suke gari (1972)
- Zone Fighter (1973, TV Series) - Yôichirô Sakimori
- The War in Space (1977)
- Ashita no Jô (1980) - Wakayama
- Rengo kantai (1981)
- Zerosen moyu (1984)
- Hua zai duo qing (1985)
- Sanada Taiheiki (1985, TV Series) - Mōri Terumoto
- Youkai tengoku: Ghost Hero (1990) - (final film role)
