= Yoichi Numata =

Japanese actor (1924–2006)

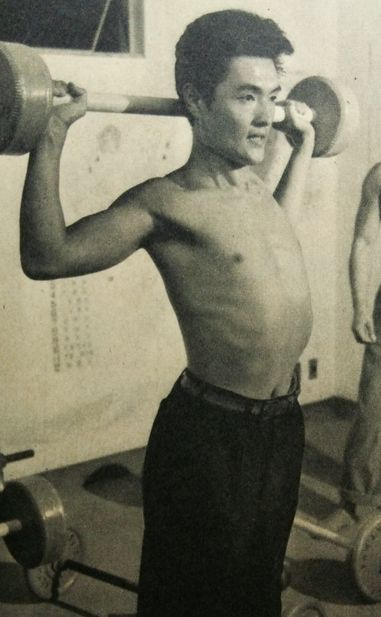
- Yoichi Numata, 1955
- Born: 19 July 1924; Okayama, Japan
- Died: 29 April 2006 (aged 81); Tokorozawa, Saitama, Japan
- Occupation: Actor
- Years active: 1949-2001

Yoichi Numata (沼田 曜一, Numata Yōichi) (19 July 1924 – 29 April 2006) was a Japanese film actor. He appeared in 27 films between 1949 and 2001.

== Selected filmography ==
- Man in the Storm (1950)
- Yellow Crow (1957)
- Jigoku (1960)
- The Ghost Cat of Otama Pond (1960)
- Deep River (1995)
- Ring (1998)
- Ring 2 (1999)
- The Princess Blade (2001)
