= Nobuo Nakagawa =

Japanese film director (1905–1984)

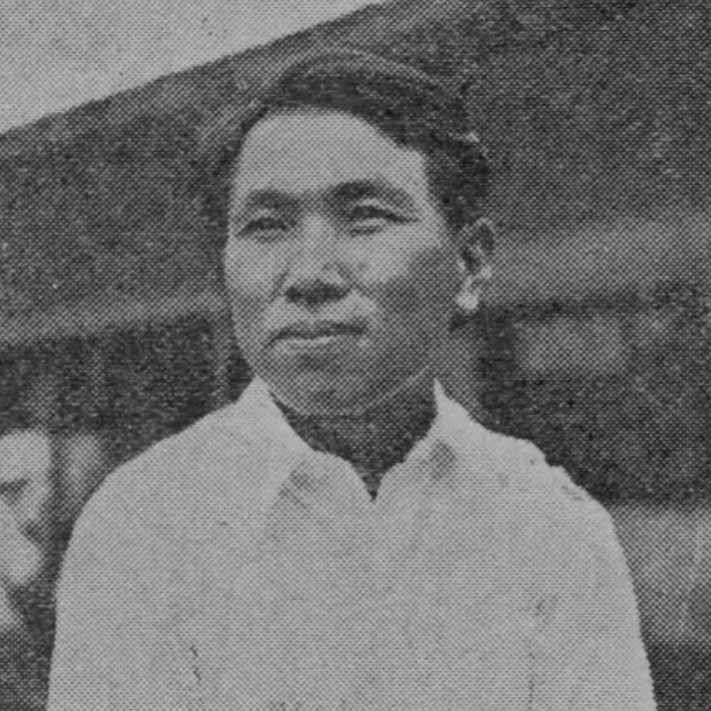
- Nobuo Nakagawa in 1940.
- Born: 18 April 1905; Kyoto, Japan
- Died: 17 June 1984 (aged 79); Tokyo, Japan
- Occupations: film director, screenwriter, editor
- Years active: 1938 – 1982

Nobuo Nakagawa (中川 信夫, Nakagawa Nobuo; April 18, 1905 – June 17, 1984) was a Japanese film director, most famous for the stylized, folk tale-influenced horror films he made in the 1950s and 1960s.

== Career ==
Born in Kyoto, Nakagawa was early on influenced by proletarian literature and wrote amateur film reviews to the Kinema Junpō film magazine. He joined Makino Film Productions in 1929 as an assistant director and worked under Masahiro Makino. When that studio went bankrupt in 1932, he switched to Utaemon Ichikawa's production company and made his debut as a director in 1934 with Yumiya Hachiman Ken. He later moved to Toho, where he made comedies starring Enoken and even documentaries during the war. It was at Shintoho after the war that he became known for his cinematic adaptations of Japanese kaidan, especially his masterful version of Tokaido Yotsuya kaidan in 1959.

To Western audiences, his most famous film is Jigoku (1960), which he also co-wrote. The film was released on DVD by the Criterion Collection in 2006.

He also filmed many kaidan for television. His last film was 1982's Kaidan: Ikiteiru Koheiji.

== Partial filmography ==
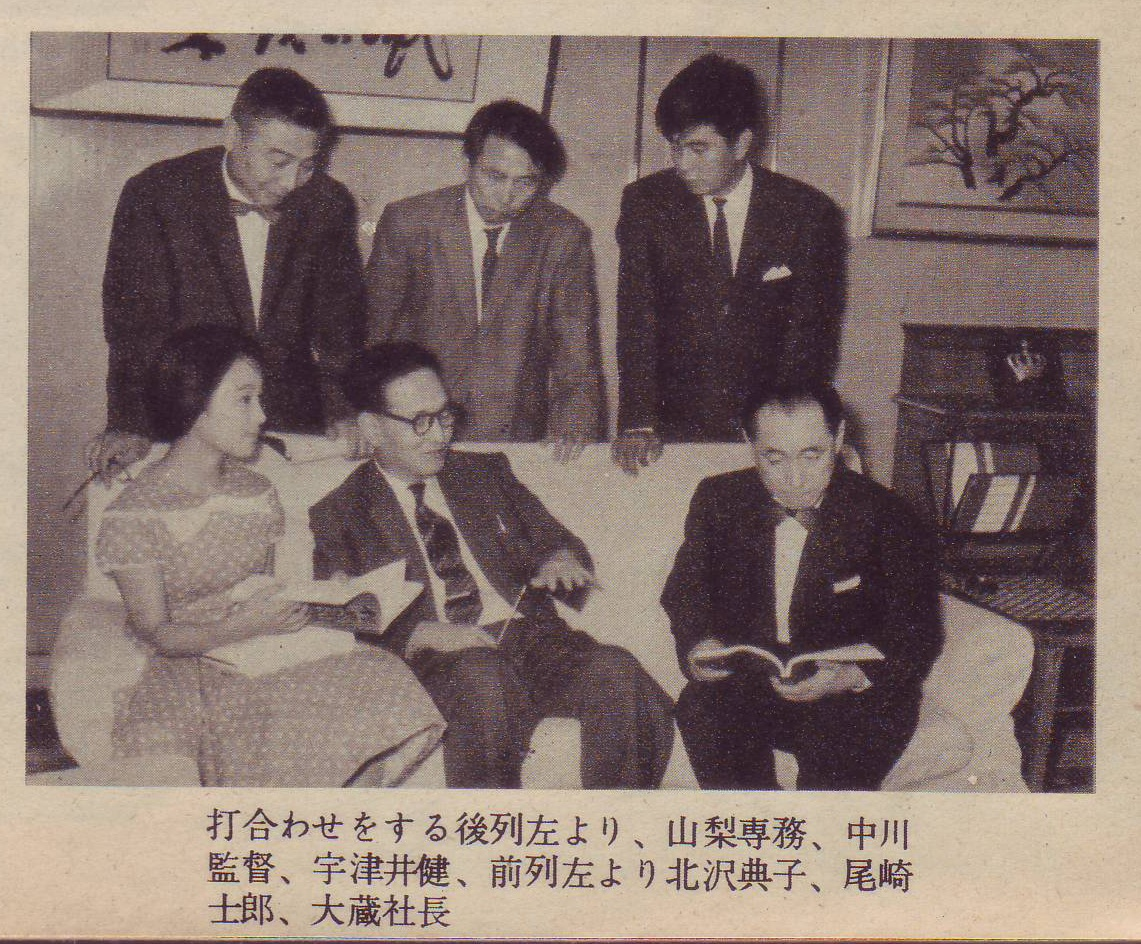
Work meeting at Shin-Toho in 1959. Nakagawa is behind in the middle.

- Gekka no Wakamusha (1938)
- Itahachi Jima (1938)
- Shinpen Tange Sazen: Sekigan no Maki (1939)
- Tange Sazen: Sekigan no Maki (1939)
- Rinchi (1949)
- Shinya no Kokuhaku (1949)
- Wakasama Samurai Torimonocho: Nazo no Nomen Yashiki (1950)
- Kyo wa Kaisha no Getsuyobi (1952)
- Kinsan Torimonocho: Nazo no Ningyoshi (1953)
- Shishun no Izumi (1953)
- Horafuki Tanji (1954)
- Wakaki Hi no Takuboku: Kumo wa Tensai de aru (1954)
- Natsume Soseki no Sanshiro (1955)
- Ningyo Sashichi Torimonocho Yoen Roku Shibijin (1956)
- Kaii Utsunomiya Tsuritenjo (1956)
- Koi Sugata Kitsune Goten (1956)
- Vampire Moth (Kyuketsuki-ga) (1956)
- Kaidan Kasane-ga-fuchi (1957) a.k.a. The Depths, a.k.a. The Ghost of Kasane Swamp
- Borei Kaibyo Yashiki (1958) a.k.a. Black Cat Mansion
- Dokufu Takahashi Oden (1958)
- Kenpei to Yūrei (1958)
- Kyōen Kobanzame (侠艶小判鮫) (1958) - First part is Kyōen Kobanzame zenpen (侠艶小判鮫 前篇) and the second part is Kyōen Kobanzame kōhen (侠艶小判鮫 後篇).
- Tokaido Yotsuya kaidan (1959) a.k.a. The Ghost of Yotsuya
- Nippon Romansu Kyuko (1959)
- Onna Kyuketsuki (1959) a.k.a. Woman Vampire, a.k.a. Lady Vampire
- Onna Shikeishu no Datsugoku (1960) a.k.a. Death Row Woman
- Jigoku (1960) a.k.a. Hell, a.k.a. Sinners of Hell
- Hatamoto Kenka Taka (1961)
- Nendo no Omen Yori: Kaachan (1961)
- Inazuma to Uge no Ketto (1962)
- Kaidan Hebi-onna (1968) a.k.a. Ghost of the Snake Woman
- Yoen Dokufuden: Hitokiri Okatsu (1969)
- Yoen Dokufuden: Okatsu Kyojo Tabi (1969)
- Kaidan: Ikiteiru Koheiji (1982)
