= Jigoku (film) =

- Promotional release poster
- Directed by: Nobuo Nakagawa
- Screenplay by: Nobuo Nakagawa; Ichirō Miyagawa
- Produced by: Mitsugu Okura
- Starring: Shigeru Amachi; Utako Mitsuya; Yōichi Numata
- Cinematography: Mamoru Morita
- Edited by: Toshio Goto
- Music by: Chumei Watanabe
- Production company: Shintoho
- Release date: 30 July 1960 (Japan)
- Running time: 100 minutes
- Country: Japan

Jigoku (地獄; Japanese: [d͡ʑiɡo̞kɯ̟]; "Hell"), also titled The Sinners of Hell, is a 1960 Japanese horror film directed by Nobuo Nakagawa and produced by Shintoho. The film stars Shigeru Amachi, Utako Mitsuya, and Yōichi Numata, and is notable for separating itself from other Japanese horror films of the era such as Kwaidan or Onibaba due to its graphic imagery of torment in Hell. It has gained a cult film status. Shintoho declared bankruptcy in 1961, its last production being Jigoku.

In 1979, acclaimed Nikkatsu director Tatsumi Kumashiro remade Jigoku for Toei, starring Mieko Harada. This version has a theme song, "Kokoro dake Aishite" (心だけ愛して), performed by Hako Yamasaki.

== Plot ==
A student, Shirō, is set to marry his girlfriend, Yukiko, the daughter of his professor, Mr. Yajima. After announcing the engagement, Shirō's colleague Tamura drives Shirō home. Taking a side street at Shirō's request, Tamura hits and kills yakuza gang leader, Kyōichi. Though Shirō wants to stop, Tamura keeps driving, feels no guilt and says that it is Shirō's fault for asking him to drive down that street. Kyōichi's mother, who witnessed the incident, resolves to find and kill them.

Though Tamura feels no guilt for the killing, Shirō does and attempts to go to the police. After telling Yukiko of what happened, Shirō insists that they take a taxi cab to the police station, despite Yukiko's pleas to walk instead. The vehicle crashes, killing Yukiko. After Yukiko's funeral, Shirō meets strip bar worker and Kyōichi's grieving girlfriend Yoko, who discovers Shirō's culpability for the hit-and-run after sleeping with him and, with Kyōichi's mother, plots revenge.

Shirō learns that his mother, Ito—who lives in a retirement community run by his father, Gōzō—is dying. Shirō arrives there and meets the other residents of the community, including a painter, Ensai, who is wanted for a crime in another city and is painting a portrait of Hell; a former reporter, Akagawa; a corrupt detective, Hariya; the community doctor, Dr. Kasuma; and Sachiko, a nurse and Ensai's daughter, who bears an uncanny resemblance to Yukiko. While Ito lies dying, Gōzō carries on an open affair with a mistress. Later, Mr. and Mrs. Yajima arrive by train. Ito dies, and Ensai (who was Ito's lover years prior to Ito and Gōzō's marriage) lambasts Gōzō for his activities with his mistress. Tamura appears and reveals that each resident has some complicity in a murder: Mr. Yajima caused the death of a fellow soldier during a war; both Hariya and Akagawa framed or slandered innocent men who then both died by suicide; and Dr. Kasuma knowingly misdiagnosed Ito's condition.

Yoko tracks Shirō down and meets with him on a rope bridge. She reveals her identity and attempts to shoot him, but trips and falls to her death. Tamura appears, and after a struggle, Tamura also falls into the gorge. Shirō returns in time for the community's tenth anniversary party, where Gōzō has allowed cheap, rancid fish to be served to the residents. As the partiers descend into insobriety, Gōzō finds his mistress lying with his son. A brief altercation occurs in the attic that accidentally leads to her falling to her death. Shirō, going outside after being told by his father to not say anything, encounters Mr. and Mrs. Yajima leaving the party. They soon kill themselves by leaping in front of a train. The residents die from consuming the tainted fish, and Kyōichi's mother poisons the remaining residents' wine, killing them. Tamura, near death, stumbles into the party and shoots Sachiko. Enraged, Shirō strangles Tamura to death while Kyoichi's mother does the same to him.

In Limbo, Shirō encounters Yukiko, who reveals that she was pregnant with their child when she died. Having sent the baby girl, whom she names Harumi, floating away on the Sanzu River, Yukiko begs Shirō to save the child. Shirō enters Hell and is sentenced to punishment by Lord Enma (the king of Hell) for his sins. While searching for his daughter in Hell, Shirō witnesses those from his life suffering for their wrongdoings—being boiled and burned, flayed, or dismembered and beaten by oni, only to be revived to suffer anew. Tamura taunts Shirō, saying there is no escape from Hell, before Tamura himself is tortured for his misdeeds. Shirō finds Sachiko, but their reunion is interrupted by Ito, who reveals that Sachiko is his sister: Shirō is actually Ensai's son, and Sachiko is actually Ito's daughter. While caught in a vortex of damned souls, Shirō finds his baby daughter helplessly being tortured on a large wheel. Lord Enma gives Shirō one chance to save his daughter, otherwise she too will suffer eternally. As Yukiko, Sachiko, and his mother call to him, Shirō leaps onto the wheel, but cannot reach his daughter.

In the realm of the living, everyone at the party is dead, including Ensai, who has hanged himself after completing his portrait of Hell and setting it on fire. Elsewhere, both Sachiko and Yukiko are seen standing and smiling, calling to Shirō as sister and lover, respectively, with lotus petals falling around them, implying that Shirō has success in saving his daughter, enabling the souls Sachiko, Yukiko and Shirō to be purified to go to Heaven.

== Cast ==
- Shigeru Amachi as Shirō Shimizu, a young student who suffers guilt from his involvement in a hit-and-run on the night of his engagement to his girlfriend.
- Utako Mitsuya in a dual role as:
  - Yukiko Yajima, Shirō's loving girlfriend.
  - Sachiko Taniguchi, a young nurse who looks uncannily like Yukiko, and the daughter of a disgraced painter at a retirement community.
- Yōichi Numata as Tamura, Shirō's classmate, who inexplicably knows everyone's sinful past, and was driving the car during the hit and run.
- Hiroshi Izumida as Kyōichi "Tiger" Shiga, a drunken gangster hit and left for dead by Tamura and Shirō.
- Kiyoko Tsuji as Kyōichi's mother, who witnesses the accident and vows revenge.
- Akiko Ono as Yoko, Kyōichi's girlfriend who swears revenge on Shirō with Kyōichi's Mother.
- Hiroshi Hayashi as Gōzō Shimizu, Shirō's lecherous and greedy father who runs a dilapidated retirement center.
- Kimie Tokudaiji as Ito Shimizu, Shirō's sickly mother.
- Jun Ōtomo as Ensai Taniguchi, an alcoholic painter, who is father to Sachiko. He is commissioned to paint a depiction of Hell.
- Akiko Yamashita as Kinuko, Gōzō's shameless mistress.
- Torahiko Nakamura as Professor Yajima, Shirō's teacher and father to Yukiko.
- Fumiko Miyata as Mrs. Yajima, Yukiko's fragile mother.
- Tomohiko Ōtani as Dr. Kusama, a negligent doctor of the retirement community.
- Kōichi Miya as Journalist Akagawa, a resident of the community with a soiled past.
- Hiroshi Shinguji (as Hiroshi Shingûji) as Detective Hariya, a corrupt detective who threatens to turn Ensai in unless he gives Sachiko to him for marriage.
- Sakutarō Yamakawa as the Fisherman
- Kanjūrō Arashi (uncredited) as Lord Enma, the King of Hell

== Production ==
Nobuo Nakagawa asked Ichirō Miyagawa to write the script, which was originally supposed to be called Heaven and Hell, under order of producer Mitsugu Okura. They had been influenced by various conversations they had about guilt and sins, with various inspirations ranging from the thought experiment Plank of Carneades to hearing a report about a fisherman selling poisoned fish he caught in a river to Faust. Mitsugu Okura read the script and angrily said to Miyagawa that "Heaven is nowhere to be seen in this script!", to which Miyagawa jokingly replied that he would write about Heaven in the sequel. Actor Yoichi Numata played Tamura in the film, and expressed in a later interview that he had tried to analyze the role, as the director had told him that "just like Goethe's Faust, it was about the outside and inside of a person", which puzzled him. He decided to act the way he felt, reasoning that that it would be okay if the director yelled at him, only to find that Nakagawa just silently observed him for filming; Numata felt that he couldn't play the role to his best ability because he couldn't really understand the character while also noting that "maybe acting can't be clearly understood."

The film was not expected to be well received, as Shintoho studio was considered to be a maker of low-budget, gory films. Jigoku was made in a hurry, and was the last Shintoho production. For the scenes which take place in hell, the cast and crew used Shintoho's largest soundstage and put dirt over it. In a recent documentary, a crew member said that normally it would be just the crew helping to build the sets, but because it was Shintoho's last production, all the extras were helping. Mamoru Morita said that Nobuo Nakagawa tried in many ways to make Jigoku different from other horror films from the time.

== Release ==
=== Theatrical ===
Jigoku was theatrically released in Japan on July 30, 1960. Miyagawa noted that the film received reviews split down the middle about its merits. One review called the film "like a tumor" and another called it "a half-baked oddity". He mused that while they had succeeded in making the concept of people going to hell for their misdeeds easy to digest as a film, "we didn't have to make it in such a crudely popular fashion." He also noted that with the film's release before the collapse of the company's distribution system, it was not a major success.

=== Home media ===
Jigoku was released on DVD in North America from the Criterion Collection on September 19, 2006, later went out of print as of now.

== Reception ==
Retrospective reviews of the film have been more positive, with many critics now recognizing it as a cornerstone for Nakagawa’s career. Dennis Schwartz from Ozus' World Movie Reviews awarded the film a grade "A", calling it "[a] disquieting morality tale based upon the Buddhist concept of an afterlife". Schwartz praised the film's performances, and visuals which he felt 'acted as a lurid study of sin without salvation'.

In an essay for the Criterion Collection, Chuck Stephens wrote, "Overflowing with brackish ponds of bubbling pus, brain-rattling disjunctions of sound and image, and at times almost dauntingly incomprehensible plot twists and eye-assaulting bouts of brutish montage, Jigoku is more than merely a boundary-pummeling classic of the horror genre—it’s as lurid a study of sin without salvation as the silver screen has ever seen."

Brett Gallman from Oh, the Horror! praised the film, calling it "a masterpiece in visual and abstract horror". Gallman praised the film's performances, eerie score, Nakagawa’s direction, and "vivid color palette". HorrorNews.net stated in their review of the film that, "Although this film contains effects that are outdated by modern standards, it is a very powerful story that is based upon the Buddhist belief that sins are atoned for in the afterlife."

It has been developed a cult following over the years and is now considered a cult classic.
