= Jirō Osaragi =

Japanese author (1897–1973)

- 大佛 次郎
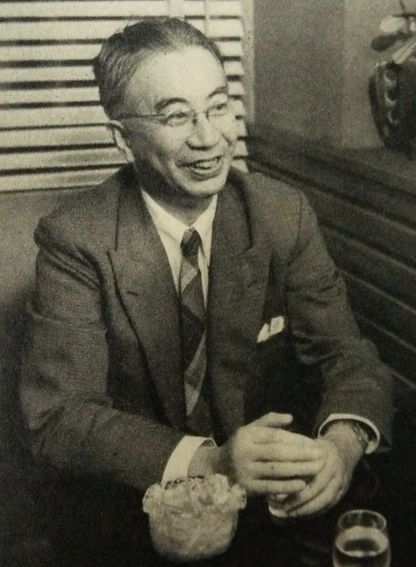
- Born: 9 October 1897; Yokohama, Kanagawa prefecture, Japan
- Died: 30 April 1973 (aged 75); Kamakura, Kanagawa, Japan
- Resting place: Jufuku-ji, Kamakura, Japan
- Education: Tokyo Imperial University
- Occupation: Writer
- Writing career
- Genre: popular historical fiction novels
- Notable work: Kurama Tengu
- Notable awards: Japan Art Academy Prize (1950); Asahi Prize(1952); Order of Culture (1964)

Jirō Osaragi (大佛 次郎, Osaragi Jirō; 9 October 1897 – 30 April 1973) was the pen-name of a popular Japanese writer in Shōwa period Japan, known primarily for his historical fiction novels, which appeared serialized in newspapers and magazines. His real name was Kiyohiko Nojiri (野尻 清彦, Nojiri Kiyohiko).

== Early life ==
Osaragi Jirō was born in Yokohama. His father was a temple carpenter originally from Kii Province, who had rebuilt the main halls and main gates of a number of noted Buddhist temples. His older brother Hōei Nojiri, was a noted scholar of English literature and an astronomer.

He graduated with honors from Shirogane Jinjo Elementary School, and later wrote in his memoirs that he first became interested in becoming a writer in the sixth grade, where the daughter of Kosugi Tengai was a classmate. He then attended the Furitsu Daiichi Junior High School. While still in high school, he published his first work, Ichiko Romance, which described life in the school dormitory. He also became interested in the theatre.

Osaragi attended Tokyo Imperial University’s Department of Political Science, where he developed a strong sense of resistance to authoritarianism. After graduation, he obtained a posting as a teacher at the Kamakura Higher Girls' School (present-day Kamakura Jogakuin High School), located in Kamakura, Kanagawa prefecture. Because of his language skills, he was recruited by the Foreign Ministry in 1922, and worked for about a year in the Treaties Bureau. However after the Great Kantō earthquake of 1923, he decided to devote himself full time to writing.

== Literary career ==
In 1924 Osaragi Jirō published his first popular historical novel, Hayabusa no Genji which was serialized in the magazine, Pocket. At this time he was living in Kamakura behind the famous Great Buddha of Kamakura (鎌倉大仏, Kamakura Daibutsu). The kanji for Daibutsu can also be read Osaragi which became the source of his pen-name, Osaragi Jirō. However, his choice of pen name of Osaragi was not mere whimsy: The Osaragi branch of the Hōjō clan descended from Hōjō Tokifusa, were prominent warriors mentioned in the Kamakura period chronicle Taiheiki. Their estates were located near the Great Buddha.

Osaragi's popular fiction novels with historical settings such as Kurama Tengu (1924–1959), Teru Hi Kumoru Hi ("Sunny Days Cloudy Days", 1926–1927), and Ako Roshi ("Loyal Retainers of Ako", 1927–1928), were serialized in newspapers and magazines, and gained him a tremendous following. Many were later made into movies and television series, with Kanjūrō Arashi, for instance, making a name for himself playing Kurama Tengu.

However, Osaragi also wrote works of contemporary fiction such as Shiroi Ane ("White Sister") and Kiribue ("Misty Flute"). Kikyō ("Homecoming", 1948) described the author's anger at petty attitudes which surfaced after World War II, and was awarded the Japan Art Academy Prize in 1950. Osaragi also won the Asahi Prize in 1952. In 1964, he was awarded the Order of Culture by the Japanese government.

Osaragi was deeply influenced by French literature and culture, and wrote a number non-fiction pieces displaying his deep understanding of controversial events in Europe: Dorefyus jiken ("The Dreyfus Affair"), Buranje Shogun no Higeki ("The Tragedy of General Boulanger"), and Pari Moyu ("Paris is Burning"; a history of the Paris Commune). When he died in 1973 at the age of 75, he was still writing Tennō no Seiki ("Century of Emperors"), a historical chronicle based on the spiritual history of the Japanese people.

== Private life ==
Osaragi lived in Kamakura, Kanagawa prefecture from 1921 to his death in 1973. Osaragi was a central figure in Kamakura's literary life, and he also campaigned avidly for the protection of Kamakura's scenic beauty. When housing developers threatened the mountainside behind Kamakura's famous Tsurugaoka Hachiman-gū, he banded together with a number of famous writers and artists (including Hideo Kobayashi, Nagai Tatsuo, Yasunari Kawabata, Riichi Yokomitsu, Itō Shinsui, Kiyokata Kaburagi), residing in Kamakura to oppose the development. This led to the foundation of the Japan National Trust, modeled after the National Trust in Great Britain, and which has been successful in preserving the historical ambience of Kamakura and parts of other cities around Japan.

Osaragi Jirō was a noted cat lover. Friends and neighbors claimed that he fed at least 500 semi-feral cats at his house in Kamakura.

Osaragi also served for two months in the cabinet of Prime Minister Prince Higashikuni Naruhiko as a councillor.

Osaragi died of liver cancer in 1973 at the age of 75. His grave is at the temple of Jufuku-ji in Kamakura. Despite Osaragi's long association with Kamakura, due to a dispute over inheritance taxes, his manuscripts and artifacts were donated to the city of Yokohama by his heirs, where they now form the collection of the Osaragi Jirō Commemorative Museum. His former house in Kamakura remains in private hands, and is open (occasionally) to the public.

After his death, the Asahi Shimbun established a literary prize, the Osaragi Jiro Prize, which is awarded for the best book published in Japan in the field of social sciences.

== Selected filmography ==
- Kurama Tengu (鞍馬天狗) (1928) - novel for the film
- The Munekata Sisters (宗方姉妹) (1950) - novel for the film
- Akō Rōshi (赤穂浪士 Akō Rōshi) (1961) - novel for the film
- Hangyakuji (反逆児) (1961) - novel for the film
- Kojiki Taishō (1952) and (1964) - novel for the film

== See also ==
- Japanese literature
- List of Japanese authors

== Reading ==
- Miyaji, Sachiro. Osaragi Jiro shisho: Sei to shi o mitsumete. Nihon Bungeisha (1996). ISBN 4-537-02500-X (Japanese)
- Osaragi, Jiro. (tr. Ivan Morris). The Journey. Tuttle Publishing (2000). ISBN 0-8048-3255-2
- Osaragi, Jiro. (tr. Brewster Horwitz). Homecoming. Tuttle Publishing (1955). ASIN: B000GUA9S2
