= List of erotic films =

This chronological list of erotic films is organized by decade. There may be considerable overlap between erotica and other genres including drama, horror and comedy. The list attempts to document films which are more closely related to erotica, even if it bends genres. Erotic thrillers are listed on a separate page.

== 1950s ==
Title	Director	Cast	Country	Genre	Citation
1950
Caged	John Cromwell	Eleanor Parker, Agnes Moorehead	USA	Women in prison film	
1956
Crazed Fruit	Kō Nakahira	Masahiko Tsugawa, Mie Kitahara	Japan	Drama	

== 1960s ==
Title	Director	Cast	Country	Genre	Citation
1962
Flesh Market	Satoru Kobayashi	Tamaki Katori, Hiroshi Asami	Japan	Drama	
Lolita	Stanley Kubrick	Sue Lyon, James Mason	United Kingdom USA	Comedy drama	
1964
Daydream	Tetsuji Takechi	Kanako Michi, Akira Ishihama	Japan	Drama	
1966
The Embryo Hunts in Secret	Kōji Wakamatsu	Hatsuo Yamaya, Miharu Shima	Japan	Drama	
Trans-Europ-Express	Alain Robbe-Grillet	Jean-Louis Trintignant, Marie-France Pisier	France Belgium	Drama	
1967
I Am Curious (Yellow)	Vilgot Sjöman	Lena Nyman, Börje Ahlstedt	Sweden	Drama	
The Graduate	Mike Nichols	Anne Bancroft, Dustin Hoffman	USA	Comedy drama	
Violated Angels	Kōji Wakamatsu	Jūrō Kara, Keiko Koyanagi	Japan	Drama	
1968
I Am Curious (Blue)	Vilgot Sjöman	Lena Nyman, Börje Ahlstedt	Sweden	Drama	
I See Naked	Dino Risi	Nino Manfredi, Sylva Koscina	Italy	Comedy	
Inga	Joseph W. Sarno	Marie Liljedahl, Thomas Ungewitter	Sweden	Sexploitation film	
The Seduction of Inga	Joseph W. Sarno	Marie Liljedahl, Tommy Blom	Sweden	Sexploitation film	
1969
Go, Go, Second Time Virgin	Kōji Wakamatsu	Mimi Kozakura, Michio Akiyama	Japan	Drama	
The Lady of Monza	Eriprando Visconti	Anne Heywood, Hardy Krüger	Italy	Nunsploitation Historical drama	
Venus in Furs	Massimo Dallamano	Laura Antonelli, Régis Vallée	Italy	Drama	

== 1970s ==
Title	Director	Cast	Country	Genre	Citation
1970
Mujo	Akio Jissoji	Ryō Tamura, Michiko Tsukasa	Japan	Drama	
Beyond the Valley of the Dolls	Russ Meyer	Dolly Reed, Cynthia Meyers, Marcia McBroom	USA	Satire, Musical, Melodrama	
Portraits of Women	Jörn Donner	Jörn Donner, Ritva Vepsä	Finland	Comedy	
1971
Vampyros Lesbos	Jesús Franco	Ewa Strömberg, Soledad Miranda, Andrea Montchal	Germany, Spain	Horror	
Il Decameron	Pier Paolo Pasolini	Franco Citti, Ninetto Davoli	Italy France West Germany	Anthology film	
Pretty Maids All in a Row	Roger Vadim	Rock Hudson, Angie Dickinson, Telly Savalas	USA	Comedy	
The Devils	Ken Russell	Oliver Reed, Vanessa Redgrave	United Kingdom	Historical drama	
1972
Ecstasy of the Angels	Kōji Wakamatsu	Ken Yoshizawa, Rie Yokoyama	Japan	Drama	
Female Convict Scorpion: Beast Stable	Shunya Itō	Meiko Kaji, Mikio Narita	Japan	Women in prison film	
Female Convict Scorpion: Jailhouse 41	Shunya Itō	Meiko Kaji, Fumio Watanabe	Japan	Women in prison film	
Female Prisoner 701: Scorpion	Shunya Itō	Meiko Kaji, Rie Yokoyama	Japan	Women in prison film	
Ichijo's Wet Lust	Tatsumi Kumashiro	Sayuri Ichijō, Hiroko Isayama	Japan	Sexploitation film	
Last Tango in Paris	Bernardo Bertolucci	Marlon Brando, Maria Schneider	Italy France	Drama	
1973
Les Démons	Jesús Franco	Anne Libert, Britt Nichols	France Portugal	Nunsploitation	
Malicious	Salvatore Samperi	Laura Antonelli, Turi Ferro	Italy	Comedy drama	
Sensuela	Teuvo Tulio	Marianne Mardi, Mauritz Åkerman	Finland	Drama	
Story of a Cloistered Nun	Domenico Paolella	Catherine Spaak, Eleonora Giorgi	Italy France West Germany	Nunsploitation	
The Cheerleaders	Paul Glickler	Enid Finnbogason, Denise Dillaway	USA	Comedy	
1974
Emmanuelle	Just Jaeckin	Sylvia Kristel, Alain Cuny	France	Drama	
Flavia the Heretic	Gianfranco Mingozzi	Florinda Bolkan, María Casares	Italy France	Nunsploitation	
School of the Holy Beast	Norifumi Suzuki	Yumi Takigawa, Emiko Yamauchi	Japan	Nunsploitation	
The Sinful Nuns of Saint Valentine	Sergio Grieco	Françoise Prévost, Jenny Tamburi	Italy	Nunsploitation	
The Swinging Cheerleaders	Jack Hill	Rainbeaux Smith, Jo Johnston	USA	Comedy	
Vampyres	José Ramón Larraz	Marianne Morris, Anulka Dziubinska, Sally Faulkner	UK	Horror	
1975
Black Emanuelle	Bitto Albertini	Laura Gemser, Karin Schubert	Italy Spain	Sexploitation film	
Cooley High	Michael Schultz	Glynn Turman, Lawrence Hilton-Jacobs	USA	Teen film Comedy drama	
Emmanuelle 2	Francis Giacobetti	Sylvia Kristel, Umberto Orsini	France	Drama	
Frauengefängnis	Jesús Franco	Lina Romay, Monica Swinn	Switzerland West Germany	Women in prison film	
Ilsa, She Wolf of the SS	Don Edmonds	Dyanne Thorne, Gregory Knoph	Canada	Nazi exploitation	
Private Lessons	Vittorio De Sisti	Carroll Baker, Rosalino Cellamare	Italy	Comedy	
The Nun and the Devil	Domenico Paolella	Anne Heywood, Ornella Muti	Italy	Nunsploitation	
1976
Cloistered Nun: Runa's Confession	Masaru Konuma	Luna Takamura, Aoi Nakajima	Japan	Nunsploitation	
Ilsa, Harem Keeper of the Oil Sheiks	Don Edmonds	Dyanne Thorne, Max Thayer	Canada	Women in prison film	
Salon Kitty	Tinto Brass	Helmut Berger, Ingrid Thulin	Italy West Germany France	War film Drama	
The Pom Pom Girls	Joseph Ruben	Robert Carradine, Jennifer Ashley	USA	Comedy	
1977
Ilsa, the Tigress of Siberia	Jesús Franco	Dyanne Thorne, Michel Morin	Canada	Sexploitation film	
Ilsa, the Wicked Warden	Jesús Franco	Dyanne Thorne, Tania Busselier	Canada Switzerland West Germany	Sexploitation film	
Love Letters of a Portuguese Nun	Jesús Franco	Susan Hemingway, William Berger	West Germany Switzerland	Nunsploitation	
Sister Emanuelle	Giuseppe Vari	Laura Gemser, Mónica Zanchi	Italy	Nunsploitation	
The Chicken Chronicles	Frank Simon	Phil Silvers, Ed Lauter, Steve Guttenberg	USA	Comedy	
1978
Lemon Popsicle	Boaz Davidson	Jonathan Sagall, Yftach Katzur, Zachi Noy	Israel West Germany	Teen film Comedy drama	
National Lampoon's Animal House	John Landis	Harold Ramis, Douglas Kenney, Chris Miller	USA	Comedy	
1979
Going Steady	Boaz Davidson	Jonathan Sagall, Yftach Katzur, Zachi Noy	Israel West Germany	Teen film Comedy drama	
Images in a Convent	Joe D'Amato	Paola Senatore, Marina Hedman	Italy	Nunsploitation	
Killer Nun	Giulio Berruti	Anita Ekberg, Joe Dallesandro	Italy	Nunsploitation	
Malabimba – The Malicious Whore	Andrea Bianchi	Katell Laennec, Patrizia Webley	Italy	Sexploitation film	

== 1980s ==
Title	Director	Cast	Country	Genre	Citation
1980
Little Darlings	Ronald F. Maxwell	Tatum O'Neal, Kristy McNichol	USA	Teen film Comedy drama	
1981
Taxi zum Klo	Frank Ripploh	Frank Ripploh, Bernd Broaderup	Germany	Dark comedy	
Hot Bubblegum	Boaz Davidson	Jonathan Sagall, Yftach Katzur, Zachi Noy	Israel West Germany	Teen film Comedy drama	
Private Lessons	Alan Myerson	Sylvia Kristel, Howard Hesseman	USA	Teen film Comedy	
Something Like It	Yoshimitsu Morita	Kumiko Akiyoshi, Katsunobu Itō	Japan	Comedy	
1982
The Concrete Jungle	Tom DeSimone	Jill St. John, Tracey E. Bregman	USA	Women in prison film	
The Last American Virgin	Boaz Davidson	Lawrence Monoson, Diane Franklin	USA	Teen film Comedy drama	
1983
Chained Heat	Paul Nicholas	Linda Blair, John Vernon	USA West Germany	Women in prison film	
Class	Lewis John Carlino	Jacqueline Bisset, Rob Lowe, Andrew McCarthy	USA	Comedy	
Private School	Noel Black	Phoebe Cates, Matthew Modine	USA	Teen film Comedy	
Risky Business	Paul Brickman	Tom Cruise, Rebecca De Mornay	USA	Teen film Comedy	
1984
Abnormal Family: Older Brother's Bride	Masayuki Suo	Kaoru Kaze, Miki Yamaji	Japan	Comedy	
1985
Private Resort	George Bowers	Emily Longstreth, Karyn O'Bryan	USA	Comedy	
1986
9½ Weeks	Adrian Lyne	Kim Basinger, Mickey Rourke	USA	Romance film Drama	
Call Me Tonight	Tatsuya Okamoto	Katsumi Toriumi, Sakiko Tamagawa	Japan	Anime Comedy horror	
Convent of Sinners	Joe D'Amato	Eva Grimaldi, Karin Well	Italy	Nunsploitation	
1987
A Taxing Woman	Juzo Itami	Nobuko Miyamoto, Tsutomu Yamazaki	Japan	Comedy	
1988					
A Taxing Woman's Return	Juzo Itami	Nobuko Miyamoto, Rentarō Mikuni	Japan	Comedy	

== 1990s ==
Title	Director	Cast	Country	Genre	Citation
1991
Malizia 2000	Salvatore Samperi	Laura Antonelli, Turi Ferro	Italy	Comedy drama	
The Rapture	Michael Tolkin	Mimi Rogers, David Duchovny	USA	Drama	
1992
Naked Killer	Clarence Fok	Chingmy Yau, Simon Yam	Hong Kong	Action Thriller	
Tokyo Decadence	Ryū Murakami	Miho Nikaidō, Sayoko Amano	Japan	Drama	
1993					
Dangerous Game	Abel Ferrara	Madonna, Harvey Keitel, James Russo	USA	Drama	
Crazy Love	Roman Cheung	Loletta Lee, Poon Jan-Wai	Hong Kong	Romantic Comedy Drama	
The Spirit of Love	Jaime Luk	Loletta Lee, Vincent Lam Wai, Poon Jan-Wai	Hong Kong	Romantic Drama Horror Fantasy	
1994					
Threesome	Andrew Fleming	Lara Flynn Boyle, Stephen Baldwin, Josh Charles	USA	Dramedy	
Girls Unbutton	Taylor Wong	Loletta Lee, Leung See Ho, David Siu	Hong Kong	Romantic Comedy	
1995
Kids	Larry Clark	Leo Fitzpatrick, Justin Pierce, Chloë Sevigny, Rosario Dawson	USA	Coming-of-age drama	
Getting Any?	Takeshi Kitano	Dankan, Hideo Higashikokubaru	Japan	Comedy	
1996					
Crash	David Cronenberg	James Spader, Deborah Kara Unger, Elias Koteas, Holly Hunter	Canada	Drama	
Sex and Zen II	Chin Man-Kei	Loletta Lee, Shu Qi, Elvis Tsui	Hong Kong	Romantic Comedy Fantasy Drama Horror Action	
1997
Lolita	Adrian Lyne	Jeremy Irons, Dominique Swain	USA France	Drama	
1998
The Idiots	Lars Von Trier	Bodil Jørgensen, Jens Albinus, Anne Louise Hassing	Denmark	Black comedy, Drama	
Joshi pro shigan: Chichi gatame manji kuzushi	Minoru Kunizawa	Momiji Nanatsuki, Tomomi Aizawa	Japan	Romance film	
There's Something About Mary	Peter Farrelly, Bobby Farrelly	Ben Stiller, Cameron Diaz	USA	Romantic comedy	
1999
American Pie	Paul Weitz	Jason Biggs, Seann William Scott	USA	Teen film Comedy	
American Beauty	Sam Mendes	Kevin Spacey, Annette Bening, Thora Birch, Mena Suvari	USA	Drama	
Sacred Flesh	Nigel Wingrove	Sally Tremaine, Moyna Cope	United Kingdom	Nunsploitation	

== 2000s ==
Title	Director	Cast	Country	Genre	Citation
2000
Malèna	Giuseppe Tornatore	Monica Bellucci, Giuseppe Sulfaro	Italy	Romance	
Quills	Philip Kaufman	Geoffrey Rush, Kate Winslet	USA	Drama	
Road Trip	Todd Phillips	Breckin Meyer, Seann William Scott	USA	Comedy	
Water Drops on Burning Rocks	François Ozon	Bernard Giraudeau, Malik Zidi	France	Drama	
2001
Sex and Lucia	Julio Medem	Paz Vega, Tristan Ulloa, Najwa Nimri	Spain	Drama	
The Piano Teacher	Michael Haneke	Isabelle Huppert, Annie Girardot, Benoît Magimel	France	Psychological drama	
American Pie 2	J. B. Rogers	Jason Biggs, Seann William Scott	USA	Teen film Comedy	
2002					
Ken Park	Larry Clark	James Ransone, Tiffany Limos, James Bullard	USA	Drama	
2003					
The Brown Bunny	Vincent Gallo	Vincent Gallo, Chloë Sevingy	USA	Experimental, Road drama	
The Dreamers	Bernando Bertolucci	Louis Garrel, Michael Pitt, Eva Green	France	Romance, Drama	
American Wedding	Jesse Dylan	Jason Biggs, Seann William Scott	USA	Comedy	
The Glamorous Life of Sachiko Hanai	Mitsuru Meike	Emi Kuroda, Takeshi Ito	Japan	Satire	
2004					
Closer	Mike Nichols	Natalie Portman, Clive Owen, Julia Roberts	USA	Romance, Drama	
Ma Mère	Christophe Honoré	Isabelle Huppert, Louis Garrel, Emma de Caunes	France	Drama	
2005
American Pie Presents: Band Camp	Steve Rash	Tad Hilgenbrink, Arielle Kebbel	USA	Teen film Comedy	
2006
Destricted	Marina Abramović, Matthew Barney Marco Brambilla Larry Clark Gaspar Noé Richard Prince Sam Taylor-Wood Marilyn Minter Cecily Brown Sante D'Orazio Tunga	Impaled: Daniel, August, Jasmine Byrne, House Call: Kora Reed, John Saint John Hoist: Vincente Pinho Neto Death Valley: Chris Raines We Fuck Alone: Manuel Ferrara, Katsuni	UK	Anthology, Art film	
American Pie Presents: The Naked Mile	Joe Nussbaum	John White, Steve Talley	USA	Teen film Comedy	
Shortbus	John Cameron Mitchell	Sook-Yin Lee, Paul Dawson, Lindsay Beam	USA	Comedy Drama	
2007
Viva	Anna Biller	Anna Biller, Jared Sanford, Bridget Brno	USA	Comedy	
Lust, Caution	Ang Lee	Tony Leung Chiu-wai, Tang Wei, Anupam Kher	China	Period, Espionage, Romance, Mystery	
American Pie Presents: Beta House	Andrew Waller	John White, Steve Talley	USA	Teen film Comedy	
2009
Enter the Void	Gaspar Noé	Nathaniel Brown, Paz Da La Huerta, Cyril Roy	France, Japan	Art Film	
Dogtooth	Yorgos Lanthimos	Christos Stergioglou, Michelle Valley,Angeliki Papoulia, Christos Passalis	Greek	Absurdist psychological drama	
Amer	Hélène Cattet and Bruno Forzani	Cassandra Forêt, Charlotte Eugène Guibeaud, Marie Bos	France	Experimental, Psychological Horror, Drama	
American Pie Presents: The Book of Love	John Putch	Bug Hall, Brandon Hardesty	USA	Teen film Comedy	
Sugar Boxx	Cody Jarrett	Geneviere Anderson, Tura Satana	USA	Women in prison film	

== 2010s ==
2010
Title	Director	Cast	Country	Subgenre	Notes
Blue Valentine	Derek Cianfrance	Ryan Gosling, Michelle Williams	United States	Romantic Drama	
Four Lovers	Antony Cordier	Marina Foïs, Élodie Bouchez	France	Romance	
Love & Other Drugs	Edward Zwick	Jake Gyllenhaal, Anne Hathaway	United States	Romantic comedy	
The Killer Inside Me	Michael Winterbottom	Casey Affleck, Jessica Alba, Kate Hudson, Bill Pullman	United States	Crime film	
Room in Rome	Julio Medem	Elena Anaya, Natasha Yarovenko	Spain	Lesbian romance	
The Orgasm Diaries	Ashley Horner	Nancy Trotter Landry, Liam Browne	United Kingdom	Romance	
Tuesday, After Christmas	Radu Muntean	Maria Popistașu, Dragoș Bucur	Romania	Romantic Drama	
Yuriko's Aroma	Kōta Yoshida	Noriko Eguchiu, Shōta Sometani	Japan	Comedy drama	
The Bunny Game	Adam Rehmeier	Rodleen Getsic	United States	Low-budget, avant-garde, experimental, horror	
Red Nights	Julien Carbon, Laurent Courtiaud	Frédérique Bel, Carrie Ng, Jack Kao	China, France	Giallo, Slasher	
2011
Title	Director	Cast	Country	Subgenre	Notes
Hotel Desire	Sergej Moya	Saralisa Volm, Clemens Schick	Germany	Short film, Drama	
Weekend	Andrew Haigh	Tom Cullen, Chris New	United Kingdom	Romantic drama	
Nana to Kaoru	Atsushi Shimizu	Rakuto Tochihara, Maho Nagase	Japan	Youth romance	
Shame	Steve McQueen	Michael Fassbender, Carey Mulligan	United Kingdom	Psychological Drama	
Sleeping Beauty	Julia Leigh	Emily Browning, Rachael Blake	Australia	Drama	
Q	Laurent Bouhnik	Déborah Révy, Helene Zimmer	France	Drama	
Ragini MMS	Pawan Kripalani	Kainaz Motivala, Rajkummar Rao	India	Horror	
2012
Title	Director	Cast	Country	Subgenre	Notes
American Reunion	Jon Hurwitz, Hayden Schlossberg	Jason Biggs, Seann William Scott, Alyson Hannigan, Chris Klein	United States	Comedy	
Excision	Richard Bates, Jr	AnnaLynne McCord, Traci Lords, Ariel Winter	United States	Psychological horror, body horror, comedy	
Marfa Girl	Larry Clark	Adam Mediano, Drake Burnette, Jeremy St. James	United States	Drama	
Spring Breakers	Harmony Korine	James Franco, Selena Gomez, Vanessa Hudgens, Ashley Benson, Rachel Korine	United States	Crime, Comedy	
Magic Mike	Steven Soderbergh	Channing Tatum, Alex Pettyfer, Matthew McConaughey	United States	Comedy, Drama	
Starlet	Sean Baker	Dree Hemingway, Besedka Johnson, Stella Maeve	United States	Independent Drama	
Clip	Maja Milos	Isidora Simijonovic, Sanja Mikitisin	Serbia	Drama	
Nana to Kaoru: Chapter 2	Atsushi Shimizu	Rakuto Tochihara, Miku Aono	Japan	Youth romance	
Nobody Else But You	Gerald Hustache-Mathieu	Sophie Quinton, Jean-Paul Royve	France	Comedy, Crime, Mystery	
2013
Title	Director	Cast	Country	Subgenre	Notes
Amai Muchi	Takashi Ishii	Mitsu Dan, Yuki Mamiya	Japan	Drama	
Nymphomaniac Vol. 1	Lars Von Trier	Charlotte Gainsbourg, Stacy Martin, Shia LaBeouf	Denmark	Art Film	
Under the Skin	Jonathan Glazer	Scarlett Johansson	United Kingdom	Science Fiction, Horror	
Blue Is the Warmest Colour	Abdellatif Kechiche	Léa Seydoux, Adèle Exarchopoulos	France	Romance, Drama	
Hello, My Dolly Girlfriend	Takashi Ishii	Tasuku Emoto, Kokone Sasaki, Naoto Takenaka	Japan	Romance	
The To Do List	Maggie Carey	Aubrey Plaza, Johnny Simmons, Bill Hader, Scott Porter	United States	Romantic comedy	
2014
Title	Director	Cast	Country	Subgenre	Notes
Flower and Snake: Zero	Hajime Hashimoto	Maiko Amano, Noriko Hamada, Rina Sakuragi	Japan	Drama	
The Duke of Burgundy	Peter Strickland	Sidse Babett Knudsen, Chiara D'Anna	UK	Romance, Drama	
Nymphomaniac Vol. 2	Lars Von Trier	Charlotte Gainsbourg, Stacy Martin, Shia LaBeouf	Denmark	Art Film	
Girl's Blood	Koichi Sakamoto	Yuria Haga, Asami Tada, Ayame Misaki, Rina Koike	Japan	Action	
Gun Woman	Kurando Mitsutake	Asami Sugiura, Kairi Narita, Matthew Floyd Miller	Japan	Action	
Love's Whirlpool	Daisuke Miura	Sosuke Ikematsu, Mugi Kadowaki, Kenichi Takitō	Japan	Drama, romance	
Nozoki Ana	Ataru Ueda, Kensuke Tsukuda	Atsumi, Chocolat Ikeda, Beni Itoh, Sū Suzuki	Japan	Comedy, romance	
Onna no Ana	Kōta Yoshida	Naoho Ichihashi, Yumi Ishikawa, Yūkichi Kobayashi, Noriyuki Fuse	Japan	Science fiction film	
Ragini MMS 2	Bhushan Patel	Parvin Dabas, Sunny Leone, Kainaz Motivala, Divya Dutta	India	Horror	
2015
Title	Director	Cast	Country	Subgenre	Notes
Fifty Shades of Grey	Sam Taylor-Johnson	Dakota Johnson, Jamie Dornan	United States	Romantic drama	
Carol	Todd Haynes	Cate Blanchett, Rooney Mara, Sarah Paulson	United States	Romantic historical drama	
Tangerine	Sean Baker	Kitana Kiki Rodriguez, Mya Taylor, Mickey O'Hagan	United States	Comedy, Drama	
Love	Gaspar Noé	Karl Glusman, Aomi Muyock, Klara Kristin	France	Drama, Art Film	
A Bigger Splash	Luca Guadagnino	Ralph Fiennes, Tilda Swinton, Dakota Johnson, Matthias Schoenaerts	Italy	Psychological Drama	
Magic Mike XXL	Gregory Jacobs	Channing Tatum, Matt Bomer, Joe Manganiello	United States	Comedy, Drama	
2016					
Raw	Julia Ducournau	Garance Marillier, Ella Rumpf, Laurent Lucas	France	Coming-of-age, Body Horror, Drama	
The Neon Demon	Nicolas Winding Refn	Elle Fanning, Jena Malone, Abbey Lee, Bella Heathcoate	United States	Psychological Horror	
The Love Witch	Anna Biller	Samantha Robinson, Gian Keys, Laura Waddel	United States	Horror Comedy	
Paris 05:59: Théo & Hugo	Olivier Ducastal, Jacques Martineau	Geoffrey Couët, François Nambot	France	Romantic drama	
2017
Title	Director	Cast	Country	Subgenre	Notes
Desire	Diego Kaplan	Pampita, Mónica Antonópulos, Guilherme Winter, Juan Sorini	Argentina	Drama	
Berlin Drifters	Kôichi Imaizumi	Lyota Majima, Kôichi Imaizumi, Mioo Satô	Japan, Germany	Drama, romance	
Call Me by Your Name	Luca Guadanino	Timothée Chalamet, Armie Hammer, Michael Stuhlbarg	Italy	Coming-of-age, Romance, Drama	
Fifty Shades Darker	James Foley	Dakota Johnson, Jamie Dornan	United States	Romantic drama	
2018
Title	Director	Cast	Country	Subgenre	Notes
M/M	Drew Lint	Antoine Lahaie, Nicolas Maxim Endlicher	Canada, Germany	Independent, Romance	
Sauvage	Camille Vidal-Naquet	Félix Maritaud, Eric Bernard, Nicolas Dibla, Philippe Ohrel	France	Drama	
In Fabric	Peter Strickland	Marianne Jean-Baptiste, Hayley Squires, Leo Bill, Gwendoline Christie	United Kingdom	Horror, Comedy	
Marfa Girl 2	Larry Clark	Drake Burnette, Adam Mediano Jeremy St. James	United States	Drama	
Fifty Shades Freed	James Foley	Dakota Johnson, Jamie Dornan	United States	Romantic Drama	
Cam	Daniel Goldhaber	Madeline Brewer, Patch Darragh, Melora Walters	United States	Psychological Horror	
2019
Title	Director	Cast	Country	Subgenre	Notes
Ema	Pablo Larraín	Gael García Bernal, Mariana Di Girolamo, Paula Luchsinger	Chile	Drama	
Clementine	Lara Gallagher	Otmara Marrero, Sydney Sweeney, Will Brittain, Sonya Walger	United States	Romantic drama	
The Prince	Sebastián Muñoz	Alfredo Castro, Juan Carlos Maldonado, Gastón Pauls	Chile	Drama	
The Acrobat	Rodrigue Jean	Sébastien Ricard, Yury Paulau	Canada	Drama	
Dogs Don't Wear Pants	J-P Valkeapää	Pekka Strang, Krista Kosonen, Ilona Huhta	Finland	Drama, Black Comedy	
Yes, God, Yes	Karen Maine	Natalia Dyer, Timothy Simons, Wolfgang Novogratz	United States	Comedy drama	

== 2020s ==
Title	Director	Cast	Country	Genre	Citation
2020
PVT Chat	Ben Hozie	Julia Fox, Peter Vack	USA	Drama	
Possessor	Brandon Cronenburg	Andrea Riseborough, Christopher Abbott, Rossif Sutherland	Canada, UK	Science fiction, psychological horror	
Dry Wind	Daniel Nolasco	Leandro Faria Lelo, Allan Jacinto Santana, Renata Carvalho	Brazil	Drama	
American Pie Presents: Girls' Rules	Mike Elliott		USA	Teen film, Comedy	
2021
Titane	Julia Ducournau	Agathe Rousselle, Vincent Lindon, Garance Marillier	France	Body horror, psychological drama	
2022
Serve the People	Jang Cheol-soo	Yeon Woo-jin, Ji An, Jo Sung-ha	South Korea	Romantic drama	
X	Ti West	Mia Goth, Jenna Ortega, Brittany Snow, Kid Cudi, Martin Henderson, Owen Campbell	USA	Slasher	
Lonesome	Craig Boreham	Josh Lavery, Daniel Gabriel, Ian Roberts	Australia	Drama	
2023
Infinity Pool	Brandon Cronenburg	Mia Goth, Alexander Skarsgård, Cleopatra Coleman	Canada, Croatia, Hungary	Science fiction, Horror	
No Hard Feelings	Gene Stupnisky	Jennifer Lawrence, Andrew Barth Feldman, Laura Benanti	USA	Comedy	
2026
Wuthering Heights	Emerald Fennell	Margot Robbie, Jacob Elordi, Hong Chau, Shazad Latif, Alison Oliver, Martin Clunes, Ewan Mitchell	USA, UK	Period romantic drama	

== See also ==
- List of French erotic films
- Pre-Code sex films
- Sex in film
- List of erotic thriller films
