= Howard Maurer =

American actor (born 1935)

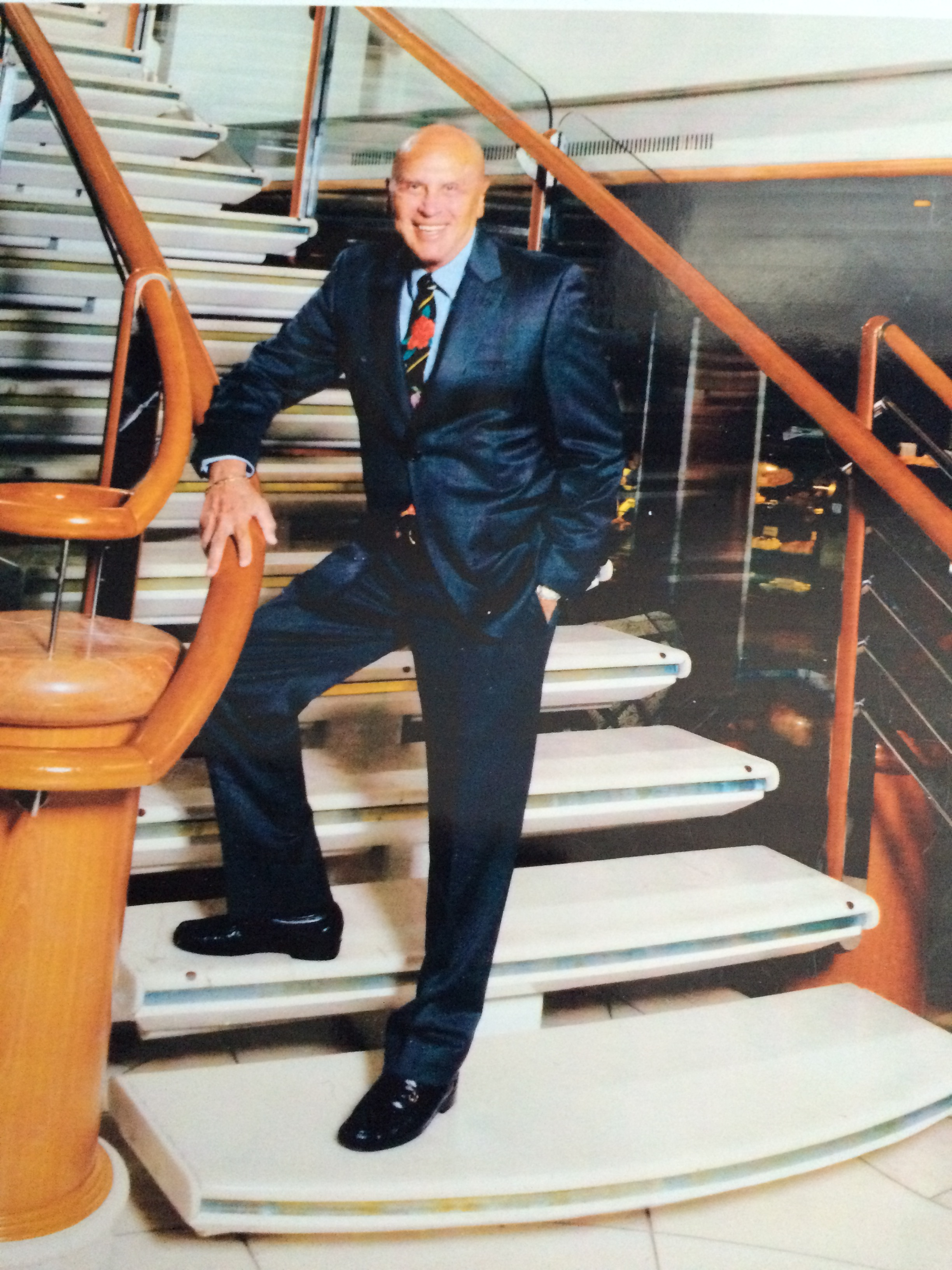
- Born: December 30, 1935 (age 90); New York City, US
- Spouse: Dyanne Thorne (m. 1975; died 2020)

Howard Maurer (born December 30, 1935) is an American musician, performer and actor from New York City. He is known for his roles in the Ilsa series of films in addition to 30 years of producing and performing musical and comedy revues in Las Vegas.

== Music career ==
Maurer began his music career at the age of 14, playing piano at parties which led to him leading bands at weddings and conventions. After graduating college and serving in the Army, he partnered with his brother Mathew Maurer in musical act The Brothers Cain which played across the globe. He eventually settled down in Los Angeles and spent much of his time working the show rooms in Las Vegas before moving there permanently with wife Dyanne Thorne.

During his career, Maurer has performed as a pianist, vocalist and band leader throughout the Las Vegas circuit, including Las Vegas Sands, Flamingo Las Vegas, The Mirage, Caesar's Palace and the now demolished Riviera. He has also composed several pieces including Jerry Wallace track Mandom, Lovers of the World, which he wrote with his brother Mathew and hit number one in the Japanese charts, and Pepper's Little People for a TV show in Las Vegas.

== Acting career ==
Maurer launched his film career in 1974 with a role in Don Edmonds' Ilsa, She Wolf of the SS, which starred his future wife Dyanne Thorne in the lead role. After marrying Thorne in 1975 and gaining his Screen Actors Guild card, Maurer went on to star in the Ilsa sequels Ilsa, Harem Keeper of the Oil Sheiks, Ilsa, the Tigress of Siberia and director Jess Franco's unofficial entry, Ilsa, the Wicked Warden. Maurer continued to appear in film and television, both alongside Thorne and on his own, including experimental anthology film Aria and Sylvester Stallone boxing film, Rocky IV.

Alongside his acting roles on TV and film, Maurer pursued a career in theatre, starring in Las Vegas comedy show Sex Over 40 with wife Dyanne Thorne. They followed this by writing, directing and starring in their own comedy show Burlesque-a Poppin. In 1975, Maurer was hired to run the new Aladdin Theatre for the Performing Arts.

== Later years ==
Maurer currently serves as a non-denominational, ordained and licensed minister for his outdoor wedding company, A Scenic Wedding, which operates in Las Vegas. The business specialises in outdoor weddings with Maurer also providing optional musical services for the ceremonies.

== Selected filmography ==
- Ilsa, Harem Keeper of the Oil Sheiks (1976), Sheik Ahmed
- Ilsa, the Tigress of Siberia (1977), Soldier in Gulag camp
- Ilsa, the Wicked Warden a.k.a. Greta, the Mad Butcher and Wanda, the Wicked Warden (1977), Governor
- Oh, God! You Devil (1984), Crap Shooter
- Rocky IV (1985), Ringside Reporter
- Fever Pitch (1985), Crap Shooter
- Aria (1987), Groom
- House of Forbidden Secrets (2013), Klaus
- House of the Witchdoctor (2013), Emmett

== TV appearances ==
- The Tonight Show
- Remington Steele
- Cannon
- Vegas
