= Go, Go, Second Time Virgin =

- Region 1 DVD cover
- Directed by: Kōji Wakamatsu
- Written by: Izuru Deguchi; Kazuo 'Gaira' Komizu
- Produced by: Kōji Wakamatsu
- Starring: Michio Akiyama; Mimi Kozakura
- Cinematography: Hideo Itō
- Edited by: Kansuke Guryū
- Music by: Meikyu Sekai
- Distributed by: Wakamatsu Productions
- Release date: January 1, 1969 (Japan)
- Running time: 65 minutes
- Country: Japan
- Language: Japanese

Go, Go, Second Time Virgin (Japanese: ゆけゆけ二度目の処女, Hepburn: Yuke Yuke Nidome no Shojo) is a 1969 Japanese pink film directed by Kōji Wakamatsu.

The film revolves around a seventeen-year-old girl named Poppo, who was raped by four teenage boys on the rooftop of an apartment building. She meets a mysterious boy named Tsukio, and both share their sexual traumas and fears, with fatal consequences.

== Plot ==
Poppo, a teenage girl, is carried by four teenage boys to the roof of an apartment building and raped by them all. The next morning, she asks them to kill her, but they mock her and one rapes her again. Tsukio, another teenage boy, has been watching the rape passively. Over the course of a day and a night, Poppo and Tsukio begin a relationship, telling each other of their troubled past and philosophizing about their fate. Poppo describes an earlier rape shown in flashback and tells Tsukio that her parents had killed themselves on separate occasions, when she was a child. In a colour flashback, Tsukio tells of his own recent sexual abuse at the hands of a neighboring foursome, all of whom he has stabbed to death. Poppo repeatedly asks Tsukio to kill her, but he refuses.

When the gang returns and again rapes Poppo, Tsukio kills each of them and their three girlfriends. While he is doing this, Poppo follows him complaining that he refuses her request, yet is killing the gang. The story ends with Poppo and Tsukio both jumping off the apartment roof to their deaths.

== Cast ==
- Mimi Kozakura as Poppo
- Michio Akiyama as Tsukio

== Production ==
Kōji Wakamatsu had worked for Nikkatsu studios between 1963 and 1965, and directed 20 exploitation films during that time. When his pink film Secrets Behind the Wall (壁の中の秘事; Kabe no Naka no Hibe Goto) (1965) ran afoul of the government, Wakamatsu quit Nikkatsu to form his own production company. His independent films of the late 1960s were very low-budget, but often artistically done works, usually concerned with sex and extreme violence mixed with political messages. Some critics have suggested that these films were an intentional provocation to the government, in order to generate free publicity resulting from censorship controversies. According to Patrick Macias, "No one had up to that point, or since, filmed porn with as overtly politically radical and aesthetically avant-garde an agenda as Wakamatsu had."

These films were usually produced for less than 1,000,000 yen (about $5,000), necessitating extreme cost-cutting measures including location shooting, single-takes, and natural lighting. Usually predominantly in black and white, Wakamatsu occasionally uses bursts of color in these films for theatrical effect. Like many of Wakamatsu's films of this period, Go, Go, Second Time Virgin is set mostly at one location—an apartment rooftop. It was shot in four days with a minimal budget.

== Themes and style ==
Reviewer Donato Totaro calls the film an "alternating teenage expression of the sex (Eros) and death (Thanatos) drives, with sex continually made ugly and death the ultimate conqueror." He further points out that Wakamatsu often puts moments in his films which appear to criticize the standard misogynistic tone of the Pink film genre. At one point in Go, Go, Second Time Virgin, Wakamatsu has Poppo look directly into the camera and address no character in the film, but the theatrical audience, saying, "My mother was gang raped, and then she gave birth to me. Are the tears we two shed when raped, the tears women shed? What tears? What sadness? I am not a woman. I’m not sad, not sad at all. I don’t cry. I’m never sad. I…I’m not at all sad…..FUCK YOU..FUCK YOU."

Patrick Macias says that writer Masao Adachi, along with Wakamatsu, is responsible for much of Go, Go, Second Time Virgin's thematic, political and stylistic concerns. According to Macias, this film, like other Wakamatsu films of the time, "combined, in still unique manner, disjunctive New Wave style, existentialist dread, sex, sadism, and gore, all on a ridiculously shoestring budget."

David Desser compares the double-suicide with which the film concludes to the shinjū (lover's suicide) in traditional Japanese theatrical forms such as bunraku and kabuki. He contrasts Poppo and Tsukio's nonchalant suicides with the michiyuki—the dramatic, poetic final walk of the lovers—in the traditional theater. Desser also points out the interesting use of music in the film. At one point, Tsukio sings a song to his mother. American standards like Gershwin's "Summertime," and the traditional spiritual "Sometimes I Feel Like a Motherless Child" as well as Patty Waters' avant-garde jazz arrangement of "Black Is The Color Of My True Love's Hair" are heard on the soundtrack.

The psychoanalytic film-critic/theorist Pieter-Jan Van Haecke, sees the roof as "a metaphor for the societal plane – a symbolic place that, with respect to dealing with youthful traumatized subjects, is but a failure". He argues that it is only by this metaphor that Go, Go Second Time Virgin is able to become a societal critique on the very fact that Japanese society fails to help traumatized subjects find a less destructive way in life.

== Reception ==
Though long relatively unknown outside Japan, Kōji Wakamatsu has been called "the most important director to emerge in the pink film genre," and one of "Japan's leading directors of the 1960s." Go, Go, Second Time Virgin is one of Wakamatsu's best-known films, but discussion of it in English has been hampered by its long lack of availability to the English-speaking world.

Compared to Wakamatsu's earlier films The Embryo Hunts in Secret and Violated Women in White, David Desser, writing in 1988, calls Go, Go, Second Time Virgin "by any standards a more interesting and less painful film to watch..." In 1998, Thomas and Yuko Mihara Weisser, in their Japanese Cinema Encyclopedia: The Sex Films, gave the film a middling review which concludes, "Wakamatsu remains an interesting director due to his obstinate disregard for social standards. But unfortunately, he doesn't make the alternative, cultural anarchy, seem very appealing either."

With its release on region 1 DVD in December 2000, English-language criticism of Go, Go Second Time Virgin increased substantially. In his review of the DVD, Daniel Wible of Film Threat says Go, Go, Second Time Virgin is "clearly a film that will enthrall some with its ultra-stylized perversions while horrifying nearly everyone else." He calls the movie "a serious and profound work of filmic art," adding "[f]rom the experimental, jazzy score by Meikyu Sekai to the shocking use of color in a predominantly black and white film, "Go Go" is a director's film all the way. Wakamatsu gets away with his graphic images of sex and violence because they are staged in ways that resonate emotionally for both the characters and the audience.

Totaro points out that in spite of the limited budget and location, "Wakamatsu sacrifices little in terms of aesthetics, using both the location and the cinemascope frame to increase the character’s psychological expression." Though warning that "[t]he relentless, downbeat atmosphere will prove tough going for many viewers," Mondo-Digital website says the film "packs a tremendous amount of artistry into every scene."

Sarudama.com's review of the film calls it "a rather dismal tale of primitive morality in the face of degradation, humiliation and abuse," and "a bizarre and despairing film which will undoubtedly cause viewers to (re)consider the role of social morality."

The New Zealand band The Headless Chickens also recorded a song named after and loosely based on this film.

== Sources ==
- Allmovie.com - Go, Go Second Time Virgin
- Desser, David (1988). Eros Plus Massacre: An Introduction to the Japanese New Wave Cinema. Bloomington and Indianapolis: Indiana University Press. pp. 104–105. ISBN 0-253-31961-7.
- Go, Go, Second Time Virgin at IMDb
- "Go, Go Second Time Virgin (DVD review)". mondo-digital.com.
- "Go, Go, Second Time Virgin" (in French). pinku.cho-yaba.com. Archived from the original on 2007-11-14.
- "Go Go Second Time Virgin (Yuke yuke nidome no shojo - Japan, 1969)". www.sarudama.com/.
- Shriver, Ryan. "Go, Go Second Time Virgin: Plot Synopsis". Allmovie.
- Totaro, Donato (May 31, 2003). "Koji Wakamatsu's Go, Go Second Time Virgin". Roman Porno Revisited.
- Thompson, Nathaniel (2006) [2002]. DVD Delirium: The International Guide to Weird and Wonderful Films on DVD; Volume 1 Redux. Godalming, England: FAB Press. pp. 329–330. ISBN 1-903254-39-6.
- Weisser, Thomas; Yuko Mihara Weisser (1998). Japanese Cinema Encyclopedia: The Sex Films. Miami: Vital Books : Asian Cult Cinema Publications. pp. 186. ISBN 1-889288-52-7.
- Wible, Daniel (2005-12-31). "GO GO SECOND-TIME VIRGIN (DVD review)". Film Threat.
- "ゆけゆけ二度目の処女 (Yuke yuke nidome no shojo)" (in Japanese). Japanese Movie Database.
