= Birth Control Revolution =

- Theatrical poster
- Directed by: Masao Adachi
- Written by: Masao Adachi
- Produced by: Kōji Wakamatsu
- Starring: Mikio Terajima; Kozue Kashima
- Cinematography: Hideo Itō
- Edited by: Shōgo Sakai
- Music by: Yoshiaki Ōya
- Production company: Wakamatsu Productions
- Distributed by: Nihon Cinema
- Release date: February 21, 1967 (Japan)
- Running time: 76 minutes
- Country: Japan
- Language: Japanese

Birth Control Revolution (Japanese: 避妊革命, Hepburn: Hinin Kakumei) a.k.a. Contraceptive Revolution is a 1967 Japanese pink film directed by Masao Adachi for Kōji Wakamatsu's production studio.

== Synopsis ==
The insane gynaecologist, Dr. Marukido Sadao (Marquis de Sade), theorizes that a woman is unable to become pregnant if she is writhing in intense pain during intercourse. He sets about testing this new method of birth control by torturing women during sex.

== Cast ==
- Mikio Terajima (寺島幹夫) as Dr. Marquis de Sade (Marukido Sadao - 丸木戸定男)
- Kozue Kashima (火鳥こづえ) as Mitsuko Marukido
- Atsushi Yamatoya (大和屋竺) as Nishimura
- Kuniko Masuda (桝田邦子)
- Hachirō Tobita (飛田八郎)
- Hatsuo Yamaya (山谷初男) as Saburō Kyōtani
- Kōji Wakamatsu as Weekly magazine photographer
- Shigeomi Satō (佐藤重臣) as Blue film actor

== Production and reception ==
Masao Adachi filmed Birth Control Revolution for Kōji Wakamatsu's Wakamatsu Productions and it was released theatrically in Japan by Nihon Cinema on February 21, 1967. Adachi used the character of the crazy gynaecologist, Marukido Sadao—a Japanese pun on "Marquis de Sade"—in his first pink film, Abortion (1966). He used the name in one or two of his film scripts directed by Kōji Wakamatsu. According to writer on Japanese cinema, Roland Domenig, these "mad gynaecologist" films, as well as Wakamatsu's "embryo" or "return to the womb" films such as The Embryo Hunts in Secret (1966), represent a re-imagining and parody of the "birth control" films which lured in audiences with titillating marketing strategies during the 1950s.

Allmovie notes that despite the main character's "silly name", the film is actually a quite grim "twisted softcore S & M film". The review warns off viewers who are not comfortable with sadism as entertainment, in the style of many pink films. In their Japanese Cinema Encyclopedia: The Sex Films, the Weissers also note that it is a dark film, and "one of those excursions into sado-erotic fare that makes Western audiences cringe".

== Bibliography ==
=== English ===
- Cowie, Peter, ed. (1977). "Japan". World Filmography 1967. London: Tantivy Press. p. 359. ISBN 0-498-01565-3.
- Fentone, Steve (1998). "A Rip of the Flesh: The Japanese 'Pink Film' Cycle: Contraceptive Revolution". She; Japanese Sinema. 2 (11): 10.
- Hinin kakumei (1967) at IMDb
- "HININ KAKUMEI". Complete Index to World Film.
- Sharp, Jasper (2008). Behind the Pink Curtain: The Complete History of Japanese Sex Cinema. Guildford: FAB Press. pp. 99, 341. ISBN 978-1-903254-54-7.
- Weisser, Thomas; Yuko Mihara Weisser (1998). Japanese Cinema Encyclopedia: The Sex Films. Miami: Vital Books : Asian Cult Cinema Publications. p. 65. ISBN 1-889288-52-7.

=== Japanese ===
- 避妊革命(1967) (in Japanese). allcinema.net.
- 避妊革命 (in Japanese). Japanese Cinema Database (Agency for Cultural Affairs). Archived from the original on 2012-03-11.
- 避妊革命 (in Japanese). Japanese Movie Database.
