= Sharon Kelly =

Sharon Kelly may refer to:

- Sharon Pratt Kelly, mayor of the District of Columbia in 1991–1995
- Colleen Brennan, American porn actress also known as Sharon Kelly
