= Sex Jack =

- Directed by: Kōji Wakamatsu
- Written by: Masao Adachi
- Produced by: Wakamatsu Productions
- Starring: Michio Akiyama; Mizako Kaga; Tamaki Katori
- Cinematography: Hideo Itō
- Edited by: Genki Nakajima
- Production company: Wakamatsu Productions
- Release dates: 1970 (Japan); 1971 Directors' Fortnight (Cannes)
- Running time: 70 minutes
- Country: Japan
- Language: Japanese

Sex Jack (性賊, Seizoku), released in 1970, is a film directed by Japanese filmmaker Kōji Wakamatsu. It was written by Masao Adachi.

Wakamatsu expressed that in Sex Jack, he aimed to depict the consistent infiltration of revolutionary movements by government-operated moles.

== Plot ==
In the near future, a small gang of revolutionary students is hidden away by a small-time thief. While they are in hiding, everyone except the thief takes turns engaging in sexual activities with a girl who appears unhappy and perhaps unwilling, having had the misfortune of getting involved with them.
