= Live Today, Die Tomorrow! =

- Film poster
- Directed by: Kaneto Shindō
- Screenplay by: Kaneto Shindō; Shozo Matsuda; Isso Seki
- Produced by: Toshio Itoya; Setsuo Noto; Kazuo Kuwahara
- Starring: Daijiro Harada; Nobuko Otowa; Kiwako Taichi
- Cinematography: Kiyomi Kuroda; Yoshiteru Takao
- Edited by: Toshio Enoki
- Music by: Hikaru Hayashi; Yasuhiro Koyama
- Production company: Kindai Eiga Kyōkai
- Distributed by: Toho
- Release date: October 31, 1970 (Japan)
- Running time: 120 minutes
- Country: Japan
- Language: Japanese

Live Today, Die Tomorrow! (Japanese: 裸の十九才, Hepburn: Hadaka no jūkyūsai; lit. "Naked nineteen-year-old") is a 1970 Japanese drama film written and directed by Kaneto Shindō. It is based on the true story of spree killer Norio Nagayama.

== Plot ==
Michio Yamada, a recent school graduate from Hokkaido, is sent to Tokyo to work as a fruit packer in a department store as part of a government programme. One participant after another quits, and so does Yamada. He drops out of various jobs, is caught while secretly trying to board a ship to the U.S., and is rejected when he volunteers for military service. Later, he kills two guardsmen with a gun which he stole from a house on an American base.

Halfway into the film, a flashback sequence tells of Yamada's poor upbringing as the seventh child of eight of a submissive woman and her irresponsible husband. As a young boy, he is forced to witness the rape of his older sister, who suffers a trauma and is sent to a mental institution, and the starving of two other sisters in their attempt to feed the youngest siblings.

Back in the present, Yamada kills two taxi drivers and steals their money. He has an affair with a young prostitute and later with a girl who frequently visits the night club where he works at. When his girlfriend drugs a customer and takes his money, she is severely beaten by a yakuza gang. Yamada in return confronts the gang's leader with his gun and beats him up. After a failed burglary, Yamada is arrested by the police.

== Cast ==
- Daijiro Harada as Michio Yamada
- Nobuko Otowa as Take Yamada, Michio's mother
- Keiko Torii as Sakie Hayashi
- Kiwako Taichi as Tomoko, the prostitute
- Kei Satō as Detective
- Rokkō Toura as Teacher Gondo
- Daigo Kusano as Hanjiro Yamada
- Junkichi Orimoto as Owner of rice store
- Sanae Takasugi as Tomoko's aunt

== Release ==
Live Today, Die Tomorrow! was released in Japan on October 31, 1970, where it was distributed by Toho.

== Reception ==
The film won the Golden Prize at the 7th Moscow International Film Festival in 1971. In Kinema Junpo magazine's list of the 10 best Japanese films of the year, Live Today, Die Tomorrow! reached #10 in 1970.

In his review for the Chicago Reader, reviewer J.R. Jones compared Live Today, Die Tomorrow! with Nagisa Ōshima's earlier juvenile delinquency dramas for their "inherent critique of postwar Japanese society".

== See also ==
- A.K.A. Serial Killer, a documentary on Nagayama by Masao Adachi
