= Love, Lust and Violence =

- VHS released by Something Weird Video
- Directed by: Norbert Meisel
- Written by: Stan Kamber
- Produced by: Norbert Meisel
- Starring: Colleen Brennan; Anthony Fortunado
- Cinematography: Robert Maxwell
- Production companies: M & R Distributors
- Release dates: June 13, 1975 (Los Angeles, California)
- Running time: 88 minutes
- Country: United States
- Language: English

Love, Lust and Violence (also known as Mafia Girls and Gangster Girls) is a 1975 pornographic film directed by Norbert Meisel, and written by Stan Kamber.

== Plot ==
A pair of Mafiosos try to confront Roger Amsford and his wife at a lounge, wanting to discuss a $20,000 debt Roger owes, but the Amsfords evade them. The men follow the Amsfords to their home, and as his associate beats Roger, Spike rapes Mrs. Amsford. On the way out Spike and his partner assault Roger's father, Gen. William Amsford, a former member of the Joint Chiefs of Staff. Taking matters into his own hands, the general has Louise Tyler, his assistant, bring him discharged Ranger Capt. Joseph Napoli, a recipient of the Congressional Medal of Honor. Having concluded that regular law enforcement is ineffective against organized crime, Gen. Amsford offers Joe the chance to lead a covert and government-sanctioned assault on the Mafia. Joe accepts the job, partly due to having grown up fearing the mob, which killed his uncle by "splitting him in half on a railroad track".

At a villa, local mob leader Tony Mandano punishes Spike for raping Mrs. Amsford by forcing him to have sex with one of his gun molls; if Spike can abstain from having an orgasm before the girl does, he will not be killed for his insubordination. Spike is unable to restrain himself, and is shot as the onlooking mobsters applaud.

For his first assignment Joe follows Roger to the desolate road where he is going to deliver the money he owes. After Roger pays a pair of thugs, Joe shoots them. Joe and his squad proceed to travel from city to city, wiping out mobsters as the Attorney General repeatedly denies that the assassinations are being directed by the Department of Justice. An affiliate informs Mandano of Gen. Amsford's involvement in the killings, and when Joe and his team attack Mandano's villa, the mob boss ambushes Joe. Joe and Mandano fight, and Joe emerges victorious, beating Mandano to death with his bare hands.

Joe, who had been courting Louise throughout the film, celebrates Mandano's death by having sex with her, after the two make plans to elope. Afterward, there is a knock at the door, and when Joe answers it, he is shot to death as Louise screams.

== Cast ==
- Anthony Fortunado as Joseph Napoli
- Colleen Brennan as Louise Tyler
- Claudine Beccarie as Masseuse
- Arem Fisher as General William Amsford
- Francisco Garcia as Spike
- Heather Leigh as Girl with Spike
- Norbert Meisel
- Al Moore as Roger Amsford
- Joe Pepe as Pete
- Michael Perrotta as Tony Mandano
- Nicolle Riddell as Georgette
- Serena as Lila Amsford

== Reception ==
Due to containing what was deemed "gratuitous sexual violence" the film was repeatedly denied release in Australia throughout the 1980s.

Ben Sachs of the Chicago Reader stated "There's not much love in this 1975 grindhouse item, an unlikely marriage of vigilante movies and hardcore porn, but two out of three ain't bad" and "This is an authentically decrepit vision of immorality, and director Norbert Meisel, composing resourcefully in anamorphic widescreen, has the virtue of being unique even in his moments of ineptitude". Critical Condition's Fred Adelman praised the film, writing "It contains good acting, an intricate plot and, for once, the hardcore sex plays an important part in the storyline" and "It offers the kind of excitement that most hardcore porn today is sadly missing".

== See also ==
- List of American films of 1975
