= Ilsa the Wicked Warden =

1977 film

- Theatrical release poster
- Directed by: Jess Franco
- Screenplay by: Jess Franco
- Story by: Erwin C. Dietrich
- Produced by: Erwin C. Dietrich
- Starring: Dyanne Thorne; Tania Busselier; Lina Romay; Eric Falk; Howard Maurer
- Cinematography: Rudolf Kittel
- Music by: Walter Baumgartner
- Production companies: Elite Film AG; Aetas Film Production
- Distributed by: Elite Film Ltd. (Zurich): Cinépix Inc. (Montreal)
- Release dates: January 21, 1977 (Germany); January 1977 (Zurich); June 18, 1977 (Montreal, Canada)
- Running time: 87 minutes
- Countries: Switzerland; Canada

Ilsa the Wicked Warden (German: Greta – Haus ohne Manner, lit. 'Greta - House Without Men') is a 1977 Swiss-Canadian sexploitation women-in-prison film directed by Jess Franco, written by Ric Meyers, and starring Dyanne Thorne as Greta. The plot follows Greta, a warden at a psychiatric hospital for young women, and a girl portrayed by Tania Busselier, who feigns illness in order to investigate the disappearance of her sister, a former patient.

Thorne was known during the 1970s and early 1980s for her role as Ilsa, in three women-in-prison films starting with Ilsa, She Wolf of the SS (1974). While she portrays a similar character to Ilsa in the film, it was originally released under unrelated titles and only received a title relating it to the series when released theatrically and on home video in the United States. Ilsa the Wicked Warden was lensed in Portugal and released in Germany, Switzerland and Canada in 1977.

Thorne later said her role in the film made her lose her contract with Cinépix. Retrospective response to the film has left critics of exploitation cinema and home video releases to be mixed on whether the film was still shocking or not years after its release.

== Synopsis ==
Greta works as the warden in a psychiatric hospital for young women. Unbeknownst to her, a patient, Abby is actually the sister of Rosa, one of the hospital's other patients. Abby has lied in order to get herself admitted so that she can find out what has become of her sister, and, hopefully, to rescue her. However, she is unaware that Greta uses the hospital's inmates to create pornography, often against their will. Abby finds herself at the mercy of Juanna, Greta's lover and leader of several of the hospital's inmates. Juanna tries hard to make Abby respond to her advances but, after she refuses, begins to exploit her.

== Cast ==
Cast adapted from Flowers of Perversion-The Delirious Cinema of Jesús Franco (2018).

- Dyanne Thorne as Dr. Greta Del Pino
- Lina Romay as Juana Marez, prisoner no. 10
- Tania Busselier as Abigail "Abbie" Phillips, Albelina Garcia, no. 41
- Angela Ritschard as Rosa Phillips, prisoner no. 52
- Peggy Markoff as Carla, prisoner no. 14
- Esther Studer as Prisoner no. 24
- Howard Maurer as The Director of Federal Prisons
- Eric Falk as Dr. Stefan Rego
- Jesús Franco as Dr. Milton Arcos (uncredited)

== Development ==
After completing work on Jack the Ripper (1976), producer Erwin C. Dietrich allowed director Jesús Franco more freedom on his next film which went into development as No Man's Land. Dietrich gave Franco more freedom due Frauengefängnis (1976) becoming a major hit for the producer and the overall quality of work done with Jack the Ripper.

Ilsa the Wicked Warden was Franco’s second women-in-prison film for Dietrich, after Frauengefängnis. Ilsa the Wicked Warden was a co-production between the Swiss company Elite Film AG and the Canadian company Aetas Film Production. The film was shot in Portugal between August 17 and September 1976. Exterior shots were lensed in August 1976 in Sintra, Portugal. Location interiors were lensed at Villa Sonnenberg at the edge of a forest outside of Zurich and studios in Rümlang.

The films leading actress was Dyanne Thorne, who became known for her role of the warden Ilsa in the films Ilsa, She Wolf of the SS (1974), Ilsa, Harem Keeper of the Oil Sheiks (1976), and Ilsa, the Tigress of Siberia (1977). Describing her celebrity factor at the time, Franco biographer Stephen Thrower said that mainstream coverage of Thorne's films were "virtually nonexistent, but anyone who walked through Times Square between 1973 and 1982 probably saw her face on posters and stills a thousand times." Thorne said she was unaware the film was going to be a sexploitation film, saying that Franco was a "talented director with whom I had hoped we would create a film of some small significance with the depth of an expose. The joke was on me." In his biography of Franco, Stephen Thrower said that Thorne's character "Greta" was basically identical to Ilsa, while still nominally being a new character. The film only received its name-relation with the Ilsa films when distributed in the United States theatrically and on home video.

== Release ==
Ilsa, the Wicked Warden was distributed theatrically on January 21, 1977 in Germany as Greta – Haus ohne Manner (lit. 'Greta – House Without Men'). It was distributed in Switzerland by Avis Filmverleih, first screening in Zurich, Switzerland in January 1977. It was released theatrically in Montreal, Canada theatrically with its Canadian theatrical title Greta, the Mad Butcher on June 18, 1977. It was released in French-language speaking regions of Switzerland under the title Greta le tortionnaire.

In an interview in Gorezone magazine published in 1991, Thorne said that film had distributor Cinépix "deeply offended" and terminated their contract they had with her in retaliation. She said that the company had "put [her] through hell" because of Franco's film as she claimed Franco had kept cameras running without her prior knowledge to grab more footage of her without her knowledge which she said Cinépix thought she was aware of and had encouraged. Thrower suggested that this was unlikely to be true as Cinépix still distributed the film, both theatrically and home video, and made a profit from it.

It was released theatrically in the United States as Wanda the Wicked Warden on January 24, 1979. Cinépix released the film on VHS in Canada in 1983 as Ilsa the Wicked Warden in 1983. It was also released as Ilsa: Absolute Power in the early 1980s.

Anchor Bay Entertainment released the film as Ilsa the Wicked Warden on home video in July 2000 and later on DVD. Scenes were cut from the British home video of the film in the early 2000s.

== Reception ==
Ric Meyers wrote in his 1986 book For One Week Only: The World of Exploitation Films that Franco's film was "even sicker" than the three original Ilsa films featuring scenes of chests being used as pin cushions and eyes being gouged among other explicit acts, saying he advised viewers to avoid the original Ilsa films or the Franco's film.

In his book Slimetime, author Steven Puchalski said the ending involving a person torn apart and eaten was particularly squeamish, the film was poorly directed, and had production values that resembled a pornographic film. Reviewing the film in early 2004 for The Digital Fix, Eamonn McCusker said that the film felt restrained in retrospect, saying that it showcased "little that can't be seen for free on the Internet, be it at websites like rotten.com or on newsgroups like alt.tasteless".

HorrorNews.net remarked that the film was "Certainly not a waste of time, just don't expect anything near what Ilsa: She Wolf of the SS originally provided."
