= A.K.A. Serial Killer =

1975 Japanese documentary film

- Box art
- Directed by: Masao Adachi
- Written by: Masao Adachi
- Produced by: Masao Matsuda; Masao Adachi; Kōji Wakamatsu
- Cinematography: Masayuki Nonomura
- Edited by: Sachiko Yamada; Fusako Ichimura
- Music by: Mototeru Takagi; Masahiko Togashi
- Release date: January 31, 1975 (Japan)
- Running time: 86 minutes
- Country: Japan
- Language: Japanese

A.K.A. Serial Killer (Japanese: 略称・連続射殺魔, Hepburn: Ryakushō: renzoku shasatsuma) is a Japanese documentary film directed by Masao Adachi about serial killer Norio Nagayama. Completed in 1969, it was first shown publicly in 1975. Adachi collaborated on the film with critic Masao Matsuda, directors Kōji Wakamatsu and Nagisa Ōshima, and screenwriter Mamoru Sasaki.

The soundtrack consists of free improvisations by Mototeru Takagi and Masahiko Togashi. An edited version of the soundtrack was released as Isolation by Columbia Records.

== See also ==
- Live Today, Die Tomorrow!, a 1970 drama film on Nagayama
