= Planet of Dinosaurs =

1977 film by James Shea

- Theatrical release poster
- Directed by: James Shea
- Written by: Ralph Lucas
- Produced by: James Shea
- Starring: James Whitworth; Pamela Bottaro; Harvey Shain; Charlotte Speer; Chuck Pennington; Derna Wylde; Max Thayer; Louie Lawless; Mary Appleseth
- Cinematography: Henning Schellerup
- Edited by: Stan Gilman; Maria Lease
- Music by: Kelly Lammers; John O'Verlin
- Distributed by: Cineworld Pictures
- Release date: November 18, 1977
- Running time: 84 minutes
- Country: United States
- Language: English
- Budget: >$1 million

Planet of Dinosaurs is a 1977 American science fiction film.

The film was a low budget endeavor with no major stars; James Whitworth and Max Thayer have the most film experience amongst the actors. Director James K. Shea instructed most of the budget to be spent on the special effects for the film, which included an array of award-winning stop motion dinosaurs, leaving little money for props or even to pay the main actors. Modern reviews have generally been negative, although there is agreement that the stop motion dinosaurs were the most notable and enjoyable aspect of the film.

== Plot ==
In the distant future, the spaceship Odyssey suffers a catastrophic reactor failure, forcing its crew of nine to eject in an emergency shuttle commanded by Captain Lee Norsythe (Louie Lawless) with her trusted co-pilot and second-in-command Nyla (Pamela Bottaro),the crew also includes Engineer Jim (James Whitworth), Navigator Chuck (Chuck Pennington),Nurse and Botanist Charlotte (Charlotte Speer),Junior exploration and Cargo officer Mike (Max Thayer),Communications officer Cindy (Mary Appleseth), Vice-president of Spaceways incorporated Harvey Baylor (Harvey Shain) and her executive secretary Derna Lee (Derna Wylde).

The shuttle crash-lands into a deep lake on an uncharted, Earth-like planet with a breathable atmosphere. As the shuttle sinks, Cindy strips down and swims back into the wreckage with Chuck to retrieve the lost radio transmitter. Before she can return, an unseen aquatic sea prehistoric reptiledrags her underwater and devours her, destroying their only link to potential rescue.

Stranded on shore with minimal rations and a few laser guns, the survivors head inland toward higher ground. The next morning, they encounter a grazing Brontosaurus, leading them to realize the planet is following a parallel evolutionary track to Earth, only millions of years younger. As they cross an arid landscape, they witness a massive Tyrannosaurus Rex kill and feast on a Stegosaurus. Captain Lee believes they should hunker down in a defensible location and wait for a deep-space rescue team well Jim onvinced rescue will never come, arguing they must accept this world as their permanent home, build a new civilization, and actively kill the top predators to survive.

While climbing toward a mountain plateau, Nyla slips and drops their remaining supply of food rations, which Lee refuses to retrieve. Shortly after, Harvey discovers a nest of eggs in a cave. Treating them like "big chicken" eggs, Harvey calls out to them and is promptly gored to death by a Centrosaurus, which tosses his body off a cliff. Lee triumphs and the remaining crew begin to build a defensive stockade around a cave. After several more encounters, including a giant spider, Struthiomimus and an Allosaurus who is pursuing Charlotte, Their fragile security is shattered when the T-Rex easily smashes straight through the wooden barriers, cornering and killing Harvey's secretary. With their defensive stockade destroyed, the remaining crew members side with Jim's aggressive strategy. Lee attempts a compromised plan: smearing toxic berry juice over the carcass of a dead dinosaur an Polacanthus to poison the T-Rex at its cave lair. However, the predator ambushes the party from behind, killing Mike during the chaotic retreat.

Abandoned by his crew, Lee yields leadership to Jim. The survivors construct deep, poison-coated wooden stakes near their camp and lure the T-Rex out of its territory as Lee follows the enemy's lair and the dinosaur have a battle between an Rhedosaurus. In a blind rage, the monster charges the crew and impales itself on the spike trap, ending its terror.

Years pass, and the survivors adapt fully to their environment. Wearing primitive animal furs and using primitive tools, they build a self-sufficient agricultural settlement, with Chuck and Charlotte raising their young son, Mikey. When Charlotte ponders whether a rescue team will ever find them and forming a new civilization in the future, Nyla gazes out over the valley and remarks that it simply doesn't matter anymore.

== Cast ==
- James Whitworth as Jim: The ship's engineer and the film's protagonist.
- Pamela Bottaro as Nyla: The Odyssey ship's co-pilot which serves as first mate and Lee's girlfriend companion of the crew
- Louie Lawless as Captain Lee Norsythe: Captain and Leader commander of the Odyssey, the film's central protagonist
- Harvey Shain as Harvey Baylor: Vice-President of Spaceways Incorporated and The ship's capitalist pilot crew member.
- Charlotte Speer as Charlotte: The ship's nurse.
- Chuck Pennington as Chuck: The ship's navigator and Charlotte's girlfriend.
- Derna Wylde as Derna Lee: Harvey's secretary and Mike's girlfriend.
- Max Thayer as Mike: The ship's command officer.
- Mary Appleseth as Cindy: The ship's communications officer.
- Michael Lee as Chuck and Charlotte's son (Mikey).

== Production ==
Active development on the film began around 1976.

Early in production the concept for the film would had been about giant insects on an alien planet, rather than dinosaurs.

Most of Planet of Dinosaurs' budget went towards the special effects, particularly the stop motion dinosaurs. Included among the dinosaurs was a model that paid homage to Ray Harryhausen's Rhedosaurus from The Beast from 20,000 Fathoms. Since most of the budget had been spent creating the stop motion effects, all of the actors had to sign partial deferments for their contracts and at least one actress (Derna Wylde) claims that she never received the balance of what was owed to her. In addition, the low budget was reflected in many of the props. The "fermented berry juice" used in the film was grape Kool-Aid, but it tasted "like liquid cardboard." Filming took place in the Vasquez Rocks area of California's desert, in an area previously used to film several episodes of Star Trek.

Planet of Dinosaurs did not have a theatrical release. The film is registered as copyright to Deathbeast Productions in the United States Copyright Office database.

== Reception ==
The film won the 1980 Saturn Award, presented by the Academy of Science Fiction, Fantasy & Horror Films, in the "Best Film Produced for Under $1,000,000" category, taking specific note of its stop motion effects. The film was first released on DVD in 2001 and again by Retromedia Entertainment on September 25, 2007, as a "30th Anniversary Edition" in widescreen format that was initially mislabeled as the "20th Anniversary Edition". The latter contains bonus features, while the former does not.

Reviews of the film were negative, with a particular focus on the acting, dialogue, and overall aesthetic, although the stop motion dinosaurs were generally praised. When the film was released with a RiffTrax audio commentary in 2010, Steven Biodrowski of Cinefantastique reviewed the movie and called it "pure 1970s camp", but claimed that the dinosaurs "are fun to watch in a nostalgic kind of way". TV Guide gave it 2 stars out of 5. The film maintains a rating of 3.8 out of 10 on the Internet Movie Database as of July 2024.

== See also ==
- List of films featuring dinosaurs
- King Dinosaur - a 1955 film with a similar premise
