= Erotic Liaisons =

- DVD cover
- Directed by: Kōji Wakamatsu
- Distributed by: Shochiku
- Release date: October 17, 1992 (Japan)
- Running time: 95 minutes
- Country: Japan
- Language: Japanese

Erotic Liaisons (Japanese: エロチックな関係, Hepburn: Erochikku na Kankei) is a 1992 Japanese drama film directed by Kōji Wakamatsu. It was released on October 17, 1992.

== Cast ==
- Jennifer Galin as Loren
- Rie Miyazawa as Rie
- Takeshi Kitano as Okuyama
- Yuya Uchida as Kishin

== Reception ==
On Midnight Eye, Jasper Sharp said the film "is ponderously paced and decidedly unexciting, and its erotic content pretty sparse."
