= Max Thayer =

American actor

- Born: Michael Thayer; June 18, 1946 (age 79); Detroit, Michigan, United States
- Other name: Michael R. Thayer
- Occupation: Film actor
- Years active: 1975 –

Michael "Max" Thayer (born June 18, 1946) is an American movie actor, sometimes credited as Michael R. Thayer. He is mostly known for playing lead roles in several B-movies and action films such as Ilsa, Harem Keeper of the Oil Sheiks, Planet of Dinosaurs and No Retreat, No Surrender 2.

== Biography ==
After serving in the US Army, Thayer decided to become an actor. He first appeared in theater, then in several low-budget movies during the 1970s. In 1976, he played the lead male role, opposite Dyanne Thorne in Ilsa, Harem Keeper of the Oil Sheiks. He went on to play roles in such films as Planet of Dinosaurs and The Retrievers. During the 1980s, after a short hiatus from acting due to an accident, Thayer found himself working in the Philippines, where he starred in several low-budget action films such as Deadringer, No Dead Heroes and Phantom soldiers. In 1987, he played one of the lead roles in the action film No Retreat, No Surrender 2, opposite Loren Avedon and Cynthia Rothrock. In the 1990s and 2000s, he appeared mostly in bit parts. In 2018, he played one of the lead roles in the independent film In the Middle of the River.

== Partial filmography ==
- Ilsa, Harem Keeper of the Oil Sheiks (1976)
- Planet of Dinosaurs (1978)
- Hot Ice (1977)
- The Retrievers (1981)
- Skeezer (1982)
- The Story of the Dolls (1984)
- Talk Dirty to Me Part III (1984)
- Perfect Fit (1985)
- Deadringer (1985)
- Iron Eagle (1986)
- No Dead Heroes (1987)
- No Retreat, No Surrender 2 (1987)
- A Night at the Magic Castle (1988)
- Phantom Soldiers (1989)
- Dominion (1995)
- Visions (1996)
- Sworn to Justice (1996)
- The Man Who Wasn't There (2001)
- Pearl Harbor (2001)
- American Gun (2002)
- C.E.O. (2002)
- S.W.A.T.(2003)
- The War of Gene (2004)
- A Killing in Choctaw (2004)
- In the Middle of the River (2018)
