= Point of Terror =

- Theatrical poster
- Directed by: Alex Nicol
- Screenplay by: Tony Crechales; Ernest A. Charles
- Story by: Peter Carpenter; Chris Marconi
- Produced by: Peter Carpenter; Chris Marconi
- Starring: Peter Carpenter; Dyanne Thorne; Lory Hansen; Leslie Simms
- Cinematography: Robert Maxwell
- Edited by: Verna Fields; R. A. Radecki
- Music by: Don Vincent
- Production company: Jude Associates
- Distributed by: Crown International Pictures
- Release date: September 14, 1971
- Running time: 88 minutes
- Country: United States
- Language: English

Point of Terror is a 1971 American erotic drama horror film directed by Alex Nicol and starring Peter Carpenter and Dyanne Thorne.

== Plot ==
Lounge singer Tony Trelos is approached by a buxom blonde woman on a beach one afternoon. Her name is Andrea Hilliard, and she is a wealthy woman whose crippled husband Martin owns a record label. That night, Andrea goes to watch Tony perform at his regular California oceanside club. She offers to cut him a record deal. Tony begins a sexual relationship with her, and begins ignoring Sally, a former flame of his. Unbeknownst to Tony, Andrea murdered Martin's former wife in their home after having begun an affair with him nine years before.

One evening, Martin confronts Andrea, saying he witnessed her having sex with Tony in their swimming pool earlier that night. In a tussle, Andrea pushes Martin into the pool, and watches him drown. After his death, Martin's daughter, Helayne, arrives from Europe where she has been attending college. After the funeral, Tony is told by Andrea's alcoholic friend, Fran, that Martin's ex-wife was murdered by an unknown intruder, and that Helayne was sent to several boarding schools in Europe after Andrea and Martin married.

Tony seduces Helayne, which drives Andrea mad. One evening, Andrea and Tony get into an argument on a cliff near her home, and she attempts to murder him, but Tony throws her over the edge to the rocks below, killing her. Helayne witnesses the event, and the two embrace. Upon returning to the house, Tony is confronted by Sally, who shoots him dead. He then awakens screaming on the beach, where Andrea approaches him; all that has occurred has been a premonition.

== Cast ==
- Peter Carpenter as Tony Trelos
- Dyanne Thorne as Andrea Hilliard
- Lory Hansen as Helayne Hilliard
- Leslie Simms as Fran
- Joel Marston as Martin Hilliard
- Paula Mitchell as Sally
- Dana Diamond as Waitress
- Al Dunlap as Charlie
- Ernest A. Charles as Detective
- Roberta Robson as First Wife
- Tony Kent as Priest

== Home media ==
Point of Terror was released on January 31, 2017, as a double feature on Blu-ray with Blood Mania (1970), also starring Carpenter, by Vinegar Syndrome. The first 3,000 units of the release also feature a bonus disc containing the television cuts of each film. It's also on Mill Creek Entertainment's "Tales of Terror" 200 movie DVD set.
