= The Yum-Yum Girls =

- Film poster
- Directed by: Barry Rosen
- Written by: Philip Levy; Robert Jahn
- Produced by: Gary Moscato
- Starring: Tanya Roberts
- Cinematography: Louie Lawless
- Edited by: Ron Moses
- Music by: Michael Karp
- Production company: Cinema 405
- Distributed by: Cannon Film Distributors; Danton Films
- Release date: 1976
- Running time: 89 min
- Country: United States
- Language: English

The Yum-Yum Girls is a 1976 American sexploitation film directed by Barry Rosen and starring Tanya Roberts, Michelle Daw, Harlan Cary Poe, and Barbara Ackerman. The film provides a gritty and somewhat lurid look at the fashion industry and life in New York City in the 1970s through the eyes of a young woman pursuing a modeling career. The film remains largely obscure but has developed a cult following for its unique and troubling depiction of the modeling world.

== Plot ==
The film follows Melody (played by Michelle Daw), a small-town girl who arrives in New York City from Ohio with hopes of becoming a top fashion model. However, she quickly discovers that the glamorous world of modeling is harsh and unforgiving. The film portrays the darker side of the industry, including sexual harassment, manipulation, and moral decay. Melody faces numerous challenges and pitfalls in her quest for fame and success.

== Cast ==
- Michelle Daw as Melody
- Harlan Cary Poe as Peter (as Carey Poe)
- Barbara Ackerman as Locust Girl
- Sheila Anderson as Horizon Model
- Roger Baron as John
- Stanley Bernstein as Mr. Smoothie
- Tanya Roberts as April
- Merwin Goldsmith as Max
- Judy Landers as Holly
- James Rebhorn as Casting Director
