= Norio Nagayama =

Japanese writer and murderer (1949–1997)

- Born: June 27, 1949; Abashiri, Hokkaido, Occupied Japan
- Died: August 1, 1997 (aged 48); Tokyo Detention House, Japan
- Other name: "The Shooter of Tear"
- Status: Executed by hanging
- Conviction: Murder (4 counts)
- Penalty: Death

Details
- Victims: 4
- Span of crimes: October 11, 1968 – November 5, 1968
- Country: Japan
- States: Tokyo, Kyoto, Hokkaidō, Aichi
- Weapon: Stolen Röhm RG-10 .22-caliber revolver
- Date apprehended: April 7, 1969

Norio Nagayama (永山 則夫, Nagayama Norio; June 27, 1949 – August 1, 1997) was a Japanese spree killer and novelist. Nagayama's status as a serial killer versus a spree killer has been disputed, as multiple sources.

== Biography ==
Nagayama was born in Abashiri, Hokkaido and grew up with divorced parents. He moved to Tokyo in 1965 and, while working in Tokyo's Shibuya district, witnessed the Zama and Shibuya shootings.

Nagayama killed four people with a handgun between October 11 and November 5, 1968. He robbed the last two victims of 16,420 yen (roughly equivalent in US currency to $46 at the time, or $104 now). He was arrested on April 7, 1969. When he was arrested, he was 19 years old and was regarded as a minor under Japanese law at the time.

The Tokyo District Court sentenced him to death in 1979, though this was overturned by the Tokyo High Court, which imposed a sentence of life imprisonment in 1981. The Supreme Court of Japan reversed the high court's decision in 1983. This ruling is today considered the landmark decision for the application of the death penalty in Japan. The high court on remand subsequently sentenced him to death in 1987, a decision which the Supreme Court upheld in 1990.

In prison, Nagayama wrote many novels and became a public figure. His first published work was Tears of Ignorance (無知の涙, Muchi no Namida) in 1971. In 1983, he was awarded a prize for the novel Wooden Bridge (木橋, Kibashi). The Japanese writing community was uneasy with his success, given his status as a convicted killer. He was rejected by the Japan Writers' Association but did receive recognition in Saarland, Germany in 1996.

On August 1, 1997, he was executed at the Tokyo Detention Center at the age of 48 by decision of Justice Minister Isao Matsuura, just 34 days after the arrest of Seito Sakakibara, the 14-year-old perpetrator of the Kobe child murders. He made no final statement. A foundation to save poor people was established by his will.

== Victims ==
1. Masanori Nakamura (中村 公紀, Nakamura Masanori)
2. Tomejirō Katsumi (勝見 留次郎, Katsumi Tomejirō)
3. Tetsuhiko Saitō (斎藤 哲彦, Saitō Tetsuhiko)
4. Masaaki Itō (伊藤 正明, Itō Masaaki)

== Works ==
- Muchi no Namida - Tears of Ignorance (無知の涙; 1971)
- Ai ka Mu ka - Love or Nothingness (愛か無か; 1973)
- Kibashi - Wooden Bridge (木橋; 1984)
- Soren no Tabigeinin - The Traveling Performer from the USSR (ソ連の旅芸人; 1986)
- Sutego Gokko - Abandonned Child Game (捨て子ごっこ; 1987)
- Shikei no Namida - Death Penalty Tears (死刑の涙; 1988)
- Nazeka Umi - Why? The Sea (なぜか 海; 1989)
- Isui - Strange Water (異水; 1990)
- Hana - Flowers (華; 1997)

== See also ==
- A.K.A. Serial Killer, a documentary film on Nagayama
- Live Today, Die Tomorrow!, a drama film on Nagayama
- List of executions in Japan
