= Louie Lawless =

Canadian film actor, director, and producer

- Born: Louie Edward Lawless; 1942 (age 83–84); Penticton, British Columbia, Canada
- Other names: Leo Rivers, Leo Ryers
- Occupations: Actor, producer, director, cinematographer
- Years active: 1970 – present
- Website: http://www.louielawless.com

Louie Edward Lawless is a Canadian film actor, documentary director, and Academy Award-nominated producer. Born in British Columbia, he traveled to California at the age of 18 and found work as an actor in Hollywood. He eventually became involved in the production of films and worked for over two decades in film production before returning to Canada in 1994. Since then, he has been involved with Kevin Annett in producing films that raise public awareness of the abuses of the Canadian Indian residential school system. He was nominated for an Academy Award for Best Documentary Feature in 1973 for his work on Manson and he won the Best Director award for a documentary at the 2006 New York International Independent Film and Video Festival for his film Unrepentant: Kevin Annett and Canada's Genocide.

== Early life and career in the United States ==
Lawless was born in Penticton, British Columbia and grew up in Bridesville on a wheat farm as the second of nine brothers and sisters. His family was Irish Catholic. At the age of 18 he traveled to California, arriving in San Francisco before moving to Hollywood in search of a career in film and television. He gained his first exposure to acting in a class taught by Estelle Harman when he was 20 years old.

Lawless got his first acting job in the Mercy Otis Warren play The Group, which ran for a full year. He then found work at Hollywood Center Studios, first in the mail room, and then doing small production-related jobs on television shows such as The Beverly Hillbillies, The A-Team, Petticoat Junction, Green Acres, and Riptide. At this time, he also became involved in feature films through a program with the Directors Guild of America. With his production team, he was nominated for an Academy Award for Best Documentary Feature in 1973 for his work on Manson. He worked as the cinematographer and associate producer under the pseudonym Leo Rivers. He worked on The Yum-Yum Girls as a cinematographer. After his nomination, he joined the Directors Guild of America as well as the Producers Guild of America. While in Hollywood, he eventually began teaching acting and film production. His final movie as an actor was the lead role of Captain Lee Norsythe in the cult film Planet of Dinosaurs and his final American production was Abducted II: The Reunion in 1994. He returned to British Columbia that year.

== Career in Canada ==
Upon returning to Canada, Lawless began producing local documentaries in his native British Columbia on topics such as the Cowichan River. After reading a book by Kevin Annett on the abuses of the Canadian Indian residential school system, he decided to work with Annett on bringing the story to a wider audience by producing a documentary on the subject. They began working on the documentary in 2003. The film, Unrepentant: Kevin Annett and Canada's Genocide, won Lawless the award for Best Director of a documentary when it was screened in 2006 at the New York International Independent Film and Video Festival. Despite the favorable reception, Lawless and Annett refused to show the film in Canada, but eventually acquiesced and showed it at select locations in the country.

In 2009, Lawless began shooting another production, this time a fictionalized feature film called The Diary, to further examine the situation of the First Nations people under the residential school system. The new film focuses on the connection between the Government of Canada and national corporations in attacking native culture. Since returning to Canada, he has also continued his career as a film teacher at the Victoria Motion Picture School. In 2013, Louie produced a documentary called Behind The Red Serge that exposes Canada's iconic police force the RCMP for its illegal and immoral actions in the workplace.
