= House of Forbidden Secrets =

House Of Forbidden Secrets
- Film poster
- Directed by: Todd Sheets
- Written by: Todd Sheets
- Produced by: Todd Sheets
- Starring: Lew Temple; Dyanne Thorne; George Hardy; Lloyd Kaufman; Allan Kayser
- Cinematography: Todd Sheets
- Edited by: Todd Sheets
- Music by: Fabio Frizzi
- Production companies: Extreme Entertainment; BD Productions
- Release dates: October 9, 2013 (PollyGrind Film Festival); October 13, 2013
- Running time: 98 minutes
- Country: United States
- Language: English

House of Forbidden Secrets is a 2013 American horror film directed by Todd Sheets, with a score created by Fabio Frizzi.

== History ==
The film was shot in multiple locations in Kansas City, Missouri. The music was composed by Fabio Frizzi. The national premiere was in Las Vegas, Nevada, at the PollyGrind Film Festival on October 11, 2013, where it won six awards. In 2014 House of Forbidden Secrets screened in several more locations in the United States.

== Plot ==
Jacob Hunt has had some very bad breaks in life. His wife left him, his friends have all abandoned him, and his children barely see him! Jacob has been given an amazing gift and the chance he needs to get back on his feet and start anew. Jacob has landed the job of overnight security officer at the old ShadowView Manor. It has now been turned into a commercial office and retail building. Jacob is about to learn nights around the old Manor contains many secrets. A dark past that is breaking through the boundaries of time, leaking into this dimension. As luck would have it, Jacob's first night on the job is the anniversary of a dark tragedy that has stained the building.

== Cast ==
- Lew Temple as Elias Solomon
- Dyanne Thorne as Greta Gristina
- George Hardy as Bruce Cane
- Lloyd Kaufman as Grandpa
- Allan Kayser as Brad
- Antwoine Steele as Jacob Hunt
- Nicole Santorella as Cassie Traxler
- Bryan David as Jackson Kincade
- Michaela Paxton Tarbell as Hanna Martin
- Millie Milan as Tamera Davis
- Brad Westmar as Wayne Harris
- Ari Lehman as Building Crewman
- Iris Runyon as Dorothy Fremont
- Aj Finney as Axe Man
- Dustin Kaufman as Machete Man
