= Marfa Girl =

- Directed by: Larry Clark
- Written by: Larry Clark
- Produced by: Win Craft; Adam Sherman
- Starring: Drake Burnette; Lindsay Jones; Adam Mediano; Jeremy St. James
- Cinematography: David Newbert
- Edited by: Affonso Gonçalves
- Music by: Bobby Johnston
- Distributed by: Larry Clark; Spotlight Pictures
- Release date: November 20, 2012
- Running time: 106 min
- Country: United States
- Language: English
- Budget: $2 million

Marfa Girl is a 2012 drama film written and directed by Larry Clark and released on his website. The film follows a group of youngsters living in the town of Marfa. It won the Marcus Aurelius Award for Best Film at the 2012 Rome Film Festival.

Marfa Girl 2 was released in 2018.

== Plot ==
The film follows Adam, a directionless 16-year-old living in Marfa, Texas and his sexual relationships with his teenage girlfriend, 20-something neighbor, an aggressive local artist, and his pregnant high school teacher while an unhinged, misogynistic border patrol agent watches over the neighborhood. What ensues is a web of sex, drugs, and violence as the Latino skater punks adjust to their gritty, aimless life in the dead-end town.

== Cast ==
- Adam Mediano as Adam
- Drake Burnette as Marfa Girl
- Jeremy St. James as Tom
- Mary Farley as Mary
- Mercedes Maxwell as Inez
- Indigo Rael as Donna
- Jessie Tejada as Jessie
- Richard Covurrubias as Chachi
- Erik Quintana as Erik
- Lindsay Jones as Miss Jones
- Ulysses Lopez as Ulysses
- Jimmy Gonzales as Oscar
- Elizabeth Castro as Angie
- Nathan Stevens as Ty
- Rodrigo Lloreda as Rodrigo

== Production ==
Marfa Girl was shot exclusively in Marfa, Texas. The town had been used as the filming location for the critically acclaimed 1956 film Giant, which was the last movie to star James Dean. Clark cast a mix of professional and non-professional actors for the roles in Marfa Girl.

== Release ==
Marfa Girl premiered at the 2012 Rome Film Festival where it won top honors. On November 20, 2012, Marfa Girl was released on Larry Clark's website priced at $5.99 for one-day streaming access. There are no plans to release the film in theaters or on DVD. Clark has said that this online-only distribution was a way of bypassing "crooked Hollywood distributors". Past films by Clark, such as Ken Park, have had difficulty in distribution because of their subject matter.

On May 19, 2014, Spotlight Pictures announced that it had secured worldwide rights to distribute the film on all platforms; subsequently streaming access to the film was removed from Larry Clark's website.

On October 14, 2014, Breaking Glass Pictures announced they acquired North American distribution rights from Spotlight Pictures. Breaking Glass Pictures released Marfa Girl theatrically and on VOD on April 3, 2015. The DVD was released June 23, 2015.

== Critical reception ==
Despite winning the award for best film at the Rome Film Festival, the major critical attention directed at Marfa Girl has been lukewarm. Boyd van Hoeij of Variety praised the cinematography but had criticism for the performances and plot, mentioning that "the sex and nudity are as plentiful as the plot and teen characters are thin." Jordan Mintzer of The Hollywood Reporter praised some aspects of the dialogue and cinematography, but wrote that the cinematography was "nothing new" and looked at times as if "it was ripped out of a Levi's ad."

On the review aggregator website Rotten Tomatoes, 27% of 15 critics' reviews are positive, with an average rating of 3.9/10.
