= Ecstasy of the Angels =

- Film poster
- Directed by: Kōji Wakamatsu
- Written by: Izuru Deguchi
- Produced by: Kōji Wakamatsu; Kinshirō Kuzui
- Starring: Ken Yoshizawa; Rie Yokoyama; Yuki Arasa; Masao Adachi; Michio Akiyama; Yosuke Akiyama; Susumu Iwabuchi
- Cinematography: Hideo Itō
- Edited by: Hajime Tanaka
- Music by: Yōsuke Yamashita Trio
- Production company: Wakamatsu Productions
- Distributed by: ATG
- Release date: March 31, 1972 (Japan)
- Running time: 89 minutes
- Country: Japan
- Language: Japanese

Ecstasy of the Angels (Japanese: 天使の恍惚, Hepburn: Tenshi no kōkotsu) is a 1972 political pink film directed by Kōji Wakamatsu.

== Plot summary ==
The movie focuses on the actions of a revolutionary movement. One faction, with a leader called October, breaks into a US weapons depot and takes cases of hand bombs. While escaping, several soldiers are killed and October is blinded by the blast from a mishandled case of bombs. The movement's highest authority deems October unfit and sends Winter's February, leader of another faction, to take October's remaining bombs through any means necessary. This causes October and his soldiers to undergo a shift in their approach. One by one, the members start to take matters into their own hands.

== Cast ==
- Ken Yoshizawa
- Rie Yokoyama
- Yuki Arasa
- Masao Adachi
- Michio Akiyama
- Yosuke Akiyama
- Susumu Iwabuchi
