= Marfa Girl 2 =

- Directed by: Larry Clark
- Written by: Larry Clark
- Produced by: Win Craft; Adam Sherman
- Starring: Drake Burnette; Adam Mediano; Jeremy St. James
- Cinematography: David Newbert
- Edited by: Affonso Gonçalves; Margaret Reville
- Distributed by: Breaking Glass Pictures
- Release date: November 2, 2018
- Running time: 77 minutes
- Country: United States
- Language: English

Marfa Girl 2 is a 2018 drama film written and directed by Larry Clark. A sequel to his 2012 film Marfa Girl, the film follows the characters of that film, set in the West Texas town of Marfa. The film has been noted for Clark's obsession with "raw sexuality" and unsimulated sex scenes.

== Synopsis ==
A victim of sexual violence, a young mother from Marfa, Texas, tries to recover with the help of her family.

== Cast ==
- Adam Mediano as Adam
- Drake Burnette as Marfa Girl
- Mercedes Maxwell as Inez
- Jonathan Velasquez as Miguel
- Indigo Rael as Donna
- Jeremy St. James as Tom
- Mary Farley as Mary
- Lucas Elliot Eberl as Luke
- Edgar Morais as Zaden
