= Secrets Behind the Wall =

1965 film

- Directed by: Kōji Wakamatsu
- Written by: Kōji Wakamatsu; Yoshiaki Ohtani
- Produced by: Kōji Wakamatsu
- Starring: Kazuko Kanō; Hiroko Fujino
- Cinematography: Hideo Itoh
- Distributed by: Wakamatsu Productions
- Release date: June 1965
- Running time: 80 minutes
- Country: Japan
- Language: Japanese

Secrets Behind the Wall (壁の中の秘事, Kabe no naka no himegoto), AKA Affairs Within Walls and Skeleton in the Closet, is a 1965 Japanese pink film written and directed by Kōji Wakamatsu. It was one of the first pink films to be shown outside Japan when it was entered into the 15th Berlin International Film Festival.

== Cast ==
- Kazuko Kanō (可能かづ子)
- Hiroko Fujino (藤野博子)
- Mikio Terashima (寺島幹夫)
- Takao Yoshizawa (吉沢京夫)
- Masayoshi Nogami (野上正義)
