= Drake Burnette =

American actress and fashion model

- Born: Kaylan Drake Burnette c. December 28, 1985 (age 40); Houston, Texas, U.S.
- Education: University of Texas at Austin (B.A.); New York University
- Modeling information
- Height: 1.78 m (5 ft 10 in)
- Hair color: Brown
- Eye color: Blue-green
- Agency: DNA Models (New York); VIVA Model Management (Paris, London, Barcelona); Why Not Model Management (Milan)

Kaylan Drake Burnette is an American actress and fashion model.

== Early life and career ==
Burnette was born in Houston, Texas, and studied art history at the University of Texas before moving to Los Angeles, California, hoping to intern as a production assistant. Instead she was cast as "Marfa Girl" in Larry Clark's feature film. In a New York Times review, A. O. Scott opined that although Burnette didn't "have much craft as an actress", she approached the role with a "sense of humor". As a model, Burnette was (coincidentally) discovered in Marfa, Texas while on vacation in 2013. She debuted at Celine's pre-fall 2013 fashion show, and has walked for designers like Marc Jacobs, Christopher Kane, Fendi, Marni, Missoni, Acne Studios, Stella McCartney, Louis Vuitton, Chanel, Hermès, Burberry, and Isabel Marant.

Burnette is pursuing a master's degree in filmmaking from New York University's Tisch School of the Arts.

== Filmography ==
Year	Film	Role	Notes
2012	Marfa Girl	Marfa Girl	
2013	1009		Short film
2018	Marfa Girl 2	Marfa Girl	
