= Masao Adachi =

Japanese screenwriter and director

- 足立 正生
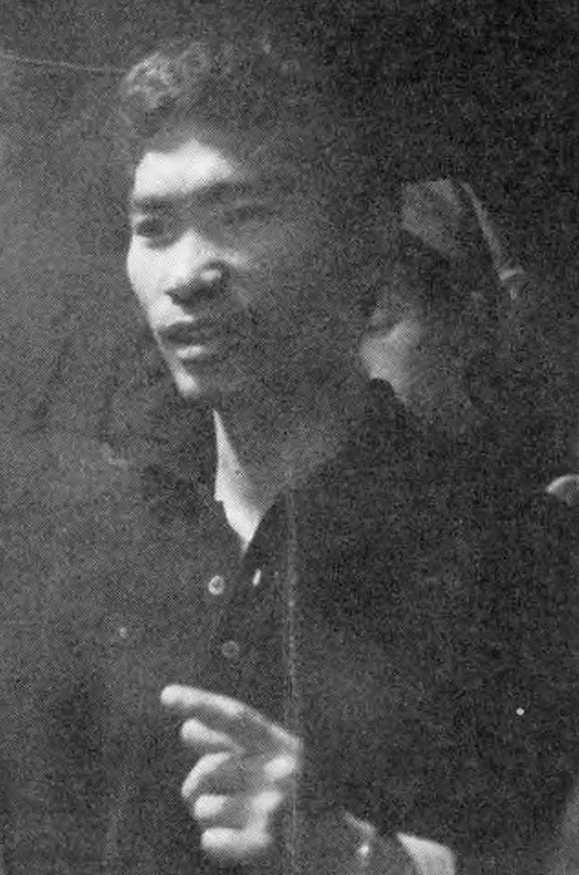
- Masao Adachi in 1967
- Born: May 13, 1939 (age 87); Kitakyushu, Fukuoka Prefecture, Empire of Japan
- Other names: Izuru Deguchi, De Deguchi, Yoshiaki Otani
- Education: Nihon University
- Occupations: Screenwriter, film director, actor
- Years active: 1960 – c. 1971 / 2003–present
- Movement: Japanese New Wave

Masao Adachi (足立 正生 Adachi Masao, born May 13, 1939) is a Japanese screenwriter, director, actor and former Japanese Red Army member who was most active in the 1960s and 1970s. He was born in Fukuoka Prefecture.

== Career ==
Best known for his writing collaborations with directors Kōji Wakamatsu and Nagisa Oshima, often under the pseudonyms "Izuru Deguchi" or "De Deguchi" (出口出), he also directed a number of his own films, usually dealing with left-wing political themes. Adachi was a prominent director in the Japanese New Wave film movement, producing pink films alongside documentaries. He stopped making films in the early 1970s and joined the Japanese Red Army.

He resided in Lebanon for 28 years, lending assistance to the Popular Front for the Liberation of Palestine until he was arrested and extradited back to Japan in 2000 due to his connections to the JRA. After being held for a year and a half he was convicted and released based on the time he had already served. Since his release, he has resumed making films.

Adachi directed Revolution+1, a film based on the assassination of former Prime Minister Shinzo Abe in 2022, focusing on a fictionalized version of the suspect Tetsuya Yamagami. On September 27, the day of Abe's state funeral, a special 50-minute version of the film was shown in small theatres across Japan. The film was to be screened at a total of 13 theatres, but one theatre cancelled its screening after receiving a series of threatening phone calls and emails. The full-length 75-minute cut was released on December 24, 2022.

== Partial filmography ==
Year	English title	Japanese title
1960	Today Has Passed Again	Kyou mo mata sugita (今日もまた過ぎた)
1961	Bowl	Wan (椀)
1963	Closed Vagina	Sain (鎖陰)
1966	Abortion	Datai (堕胎)
1967	Birth Control Revolution	Hinin kakumei (避妊革命)
1967	Violated Angels	Okasareta Hakui (犯された白衣)
1967	Galaxy	Gingakei (銀河系)
1968	Three Resurrected Drunkards	Kaette kita yopparai (帰って来たヨッパライ)
1968	Sex Zone	Sei chitai (性地帯 セックスゾーン)
1968	Sex Games	Sei yūgi (性遊戯)
1969	Female Student Guerilla	Jogakusei gerira (女学生ゲリラ)
1969	A.K.A. Serial Killer	Ryakusho / Renzoku shasatsuma (略称・連続射殺魔)
1969	Go, Go, Second Time Virgin	Yuke Yuke Nidome no Shojo (ゆけゆけ二度目の処女)
1969	Rebel Woman: Dream Hell	Hanjo mugen jigoku (叛女・夢幻地獄)
1971	Gushing Prayer	Funshutsu kigan 15-sai no Baishunfu (噴出祈願 十五代の売春婦)
1971	Ecstasy of the Angels	Tenshi no kōkotsu (天使の恍惚)
1971	Red Army/PLFP: Declaration of World War	Sekigun-P.F.L.P: Sekai senso sengen (赤軍PFLP・世界戦争宣言)
2007	Prisoner / Terrorist	Yûheisha - terorisuto (幽閉者 テロリスト)
2016	Artist of Fasting	Danjiki Geinin (断食芸人)
2022	Revolution+1	Revolution+1
2025	The Escape	Tōsō (逃走)

== Bibliography ==
=== English-language works ===
- Andrews, William. Pink Auteur, Red Outlaw: Adachi Masao and Japan’s Cinema of Revolution. Awai Books, 2026.
- Baudelaire, Eric. The Anabasis of May and Fusako Shigenobu, Masao Adachi, and 27 Years Without Images. Installation for MACBA, Barcelona, 2011. Text in English and Catalan; film, 66 min.; nine screenprints.

=== Other languages ===
- Adachi, Masao, and Go Hirasawa. Film / Revolution. Tokyo: Kawade Shobō Shinsha, 2003. In Japanese.
- Adachi, Masao. Le Bus de la révolution passera bientôt près de chez toi: Écrits sur le cinéma, la guérilla et l’avant-garde. Rouge Profond, 2012. In French.
