= Colleen Brennan =

American former pornographic film actress

- Occupation: Pornographic film actress

Colleen Brennan is an American former pornographic film actress. She has also gone by the name Sharon Kelly.

== Career ==
A buxom, freckled redhead, Colleen Brennan began her career posing for men's magazines such as Swank and Penthouse. She later starred as Sharon Kelly in several 1970s softcore sexploitation films produced by Harry Novak. She also made appearances in Russ Meyer's Supervixens (1975) and the women in prison films Ilsa, She Wolf of the SS (1975) and its first sequel Ilsa, Harem Keeper of the Oil Sheiks (1976). She also appeared in small parts in the mainstream films Shampoo, Hustle, and The Boob Tube. During the 1970s, she appeared in numerous B-level softcore men's magazine layouts.

In the 1980s, Brennan began an extensive career in hardcore pornography films, starring in several installments of the Taboo series, and winning two AVN Awards in 1987. In 1985, she hosted the first XRCO Awards with Ron Jeremy.

In 1981, she had a small role (under the pseudonym "Katherine MacMurray") as a television gossip columnist in the mainstream comedy film S.O.B., directed by Blake Edwards. Brennan retired from pornographic videos in 1986, at the age of 36. She is not related to actress Eileen Brennan with whom she appeared in the 1975 Burt Reynolds film Hustle.

== Awards ==
- 1984 CAFA Award for Best Actress Trinity Brown
- 1984 CAFA Award for Best Supporting Actress - Good Girl, Bad Girl
- 1987 AVN Award for Best Actress (Film) – Getting Personal
- 1987 AVN Award for Best Supporting Actress (Film) – Star Angel
- 1987 XRCO Award for Best Actress – Getting Personal
- 1987 XRCO Award for Best Supporting Actress – Star Angel
- 1988 XRCO Hall of Fame
