= Ilsa, She Wolf of the SS =

1975 exploitation film by Don Edmonds

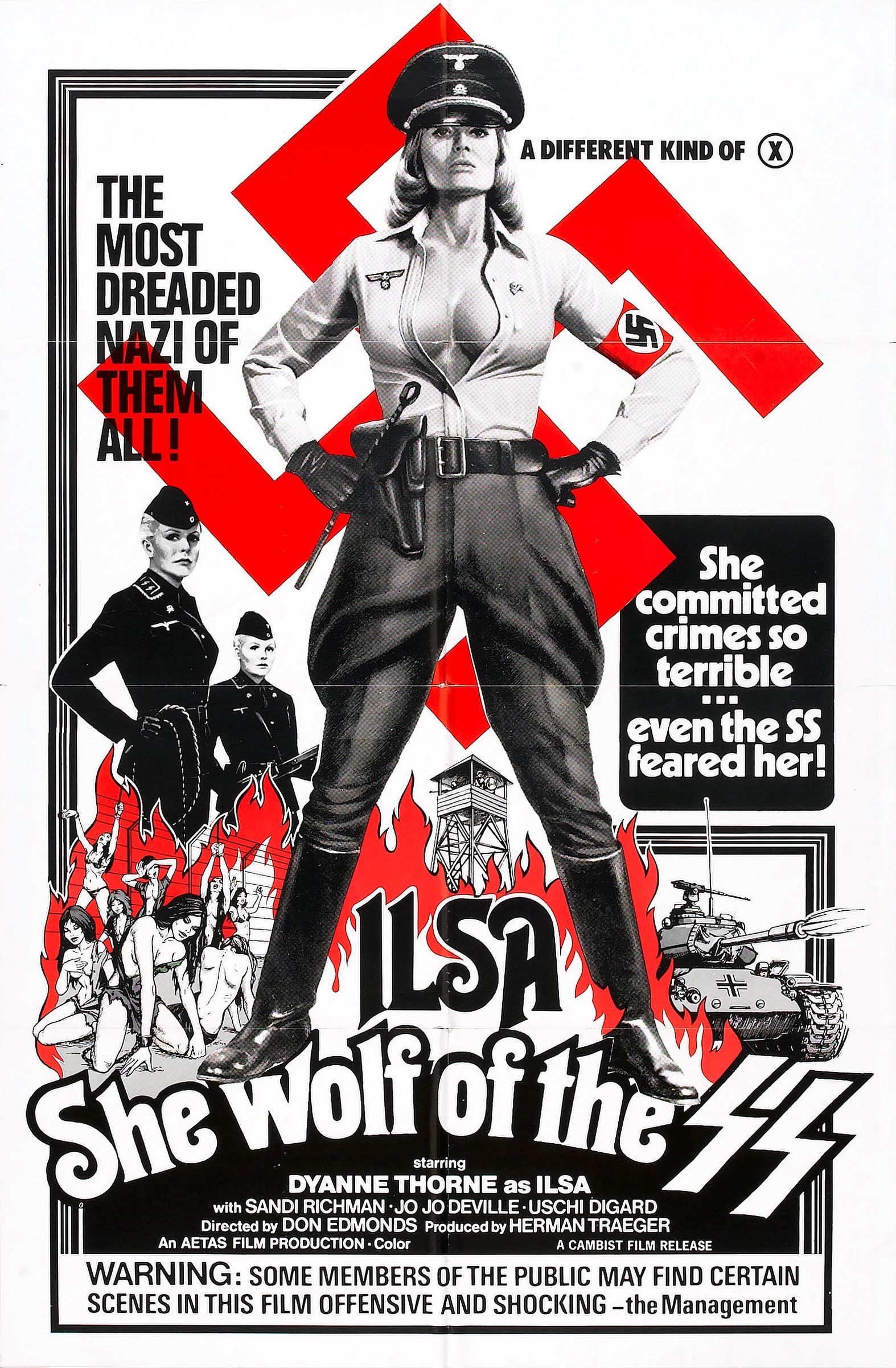
- US theatrical release poster
- Directed by: Don Edmonds
- Written by: John C. W. Saxton (as Jonah Royston)
- Produced by: Herman Traeger
- Starring: Dyanne Thorne; Sandy Richman; Jo Jo Deville; Uschi Digard
- Cinematography: Glenn Roland
- Edited by: Kurt Schnit
- Production company: Aetas Filmproduktions
- Distributed by: Cinépix
- Release date: January 1975 (Boston)
- Running time: 96 minutes
- Country: Canada
- Language: English

Ilsa, She Wolf of the SS is a 1975 Canadian nazisploitation film about a sadistic and sexually voracious Nazi labor camp commandant. The film is directed by American filmmaker Don Edmonds and produced by David F. Friedman for Cinépix Film Properties in Montreal. The film stars Dyanne Thorne in the title role, which is loosely based on Ilse Koch, a convicted war criminal and overseer at the Buchenwald concentration camp.

Upon its release in early 1975, the film was immediately met with widespread controversy and critical derision, with Gene Siskel calling it "the most degenerate picture I have seen to play downtown". Particular criticism was directed at the film's graphic violence, which includes depictions of castration, flagellation, unethical human experimentation, female-on-male rape, and many other forms of torture. Word of mouth quickly spread, and the film was a considerable financial success, becoming a staple of grindhouse and drive-in theaters.

The popularity of the film led to the creation of three sequels, each of which saw Thorne reprise her role. The film's infamy eventually evolved into a considerable cult following, with the character of Ilsa becoming a pop cultural icon ubiquitous with "strong, aggressive" female authority. The film is considered one of the prominent entries of the Nazi exploitation sub-genre, and to a lesser degree the sexploitation sub-genre.

== Plot ==
In 1945, Ilsa is the commandant of a German prisoner-of-war camp. She conducts brutal scientific experiments on German political prisoners and Allied POWs designed to demonstrate that women are more capable of enduring pain than men are and should therefore be allowed to join the Wehrmacht and the SS. As a sadistic fascist, Ilsa sexually objectifies men, choosing a new male prisoner to rape each night. However, owing to her hypersexuality, she is disappointed when her victims inevitably ejaculate and promptly has them castrated and executed.

After killing her latest victim, Ilsa oversees the arrival of a new batch of male and female prisoners of war and political prisoners. Though dismissive and dehumanizing of the majority of her wards, she becomes enamoured by the presence of Wolfe, a blond-haired and blue-eyed prisoner who, unlike his compatriots, resembles the Nazi Aryan ideal. Wolfe, a German American student who had been studying in Berlin before the war broke out, tells his cellmate Mario, one of Ilsa's former victims, that he has the ability to ejaculate at will, allowing him to engage in sexual intercourse with incredible endurance and skill. Wolfe demonstrates this when, forced to enter Ilsa's bedroom at night and gets raped, he manages to bring her to orgasm, becoming her first repeat partner whom she willingly spares.

Having gained Ilsa's confidence, Wolfe begins plotting revolt with Mario and a group of female political prisoners who have borne the brunt of Ilsa's medical torture. Meanwhile, Ilsa is made gradually more anxious by news of Allied forces breaking through German defenses. Believing that the enlistment of women into the SS and the Wehrmacht will help stem the tide, Ilsa tries to convince a visiting general of her theories of female supremacy by showing him the various inhumane scientific experiments she has subjected her female political prisoners to. The impressed general awards Ilsa the Iron Cross for her efforts, while forcing her to fulfill his nascent urolagnia by giving him a golden shower.

With German forces in retreat, the prisoners revolt, killing most of the camp guards and rounding up the surviving staff. Ilsa is tied to her bed with her stockings by Wolfe during a sex game, before he steals her gun and helps his comrades. Wolfe pleads with the other prisoners to leave the staff to be captured and tried by Allied forces, but they insist that they will escape punishment and summarily execute them. With retreating German forces fast approaching, Wolfe and a lone female prisoner escape into the nearby hills as the remaining prisoners, including Mario, resolve to fight to the death. They are attacked by a Waffen-SS tank unit, which quickly wipes out the prisoners.

The unit's commander disembarks and begins investigating the camp. Upon finding Ilsa tied up, he shoots her in the head before ordering the razing of the camp to destroy evidence of their atrocities. As he brags that the Allies will never know what happened, Wolfe and his fellow escapee watch from atop a nearby hill, the sole survivors of the camp.

== Cast ==
- Dyanne Thorne as Ilsa
- Gregory Knoph as Wolfe
- Tony Mumolo as Mario
- George Buck Flower as Binz (credited as C.D. Lafleuer)
- Maria Marx as Anna
- Nicolle Riddell as Kata
- Jo Jo Deville as Ingrid
- Sandy Richman as Maigret
- Rodina Keeler as Gretchen
- Richard Kennedy as The General (credited as Wolfgang Roehm)
- Lance Marshall as Richter
- Jacqueline Giroux as Rosette

=== Uncredited ===
- Uschi Digard as Pressurized Chamber Prisoner
- Colleen Brennan as Redheaded Prisoner
- Sandy Dempsey as Prisoner

== Production ==
=== Development ===
After Lee Frost and David F. Friedman's Love Camp 7 (1969) became successful in Canada, André Link and John Dunning of Cinepix Film Properties sought to capitalize by producing their own Nazi-themed exploitation film. Dunning was inspired by historical records of wartime medical experiments on unwilling human subjects, but also sought to add a female villain.

Dunning worked on the screenplay with writer John C.W. Saxton, drawing inspiration from Ilse Koch, wife of the commandant of the Sachsenhausen concentration camp and, later, Buchenwald. Nicknamed “The Bitch of Buchenwald”, Koch was accused of several war crimes, including an experiment in which she had the skin of tattooed prisoners removed to make furniture. The film's central premise of Ilsa torturing women to test their endurance for pain was based on a wartime medical theory that women could take pain and punishment better than men, because they were better equipped as a result of the birthing ordeal.

Link and Dunning approached Love Camp 7 producer David F. Friedman to produce, an offer he promptly accepted. Friedman was a veteran exploitation filmmaker, having produced numerous “roughie” sexploitation films, as well as Herschell Gordon Lewis’ seminal Blood Feast. The director was Don Edmonds, an actor who had begun directing sexploitation films earlier in the decade. Ilsa would be his third film as director, following Wild Honey and Tender Loving Care. Edmonds later described the screenplay as "the worst piece of shit I ever read".

=== Casting ===
Friedman’s first choice of casting for the lead role was Phyllis Davis. When she proved unviable, he sought out Dyanne Thorne to play the eponymous character. Thorne was a longtime Las Vegas showgirl who had studied under Stella Adler, and who at the time was working as a chauffeur. Thorne referred to the script as “awful”, but took the role after a friend recommended Edmonds personally.

For the role of Dr. Binz, Ilsa's diminutive male assistant, Edmonds cast his previous collaborator George Buck Flower, who had also worked with Thorne and Friedman in various capacities as an assistant director, casting director, set decorator, and grip. Flower also served as an uncredited assistant director. Binz's appearance is based on that of Magnus Hirschfeld, a pioneering German sexologist (though the real Hirschfeld was fervently anti-Nazi and anti-fascist).

=== Filming ===
The film was shot in nine days on the Culver City, California, set of the TV series Hogan's Heroes. The series had ended in 1971 and the show's producers gave permission for the film to be shot there once they learned that the climax of the movie called for the set to be destroyed, thus saving the cost of having it demolished.

Because the film was shot in the United States, it could not legally qualify for the Canadian Film Development Corporation’s "Capital Gains Allowance". Link and Dunning went uncredited in their capacities as executive producers.

=== Post-production ===
During editing, David Friedman decided to place a notice before the film's opening credits in order to add an air of legitimacy and hopefully tide potential censorship and condemnation as well as accusations of Pro Neo-Nazism. It reads: "The film you are about to see is based on documented Holocaust facts. The atrocities shown were conducted as 'medical experiments' in special concentration camps throughout Hitler's Third Reich. Although the Nazis and Schutzstaffel's crimes against humanity are historically accurate, the characters depicted are composites of notorious Nazi personalities; and the events portrayed, have been condensed into one locality for dramatic purposes. Because of its shocking subject matter, this film is restricted to adult audiences only. We dedicate this film with the hope that these heinous, absolutely HORRIFIC crimes will never happen again."

=== Use of pseudonyms ===
Several key members of the cast and crew were credited under pseudonyms. David F. Friedman is credited as "Herman Traeger", screenwriter John C.W. Saxton as "Jonah Royston", and actors George Buck Flower as "C.D. Lafleuer" and Richard Kennedy as "Wolfgang Roehm". The credited editor, Kurt Schnit (sounds like German for "short cut"), was likely also a pseudonym, as no such film editor of the time is known to have existed, and he does not hold any other credits of any kind.

== Release ==
Ilsa was given a wide release in the United States and Canada in October 1975. It was rejected by the British Board of Film Censors in June 1975 and remains unreleased in the country. It was also banned in Australia and Norway. In the United States, the film was released mostly to urban and grindhouse theatres, as was standard practice for many exploitation films of the time.

== Reception ==
Ilsa, She Wolf of the SS has primarily negative reviews and holds a rating of 36% on Rotten Tomatoes based on 11 reviews.

The Independent Film Journal wrote, "Only the most dangerously sadistic mentalities will manage to sit voluntarily through more than ten minutes of Ilsa, She Wolf of the SS, a graphic, stomach-churning catalogue of Nazi medical atrocities that makes Texas Chainsaw Massacre look like a Sunday picnic ... Theatres catering to the lowest possible grade of audience could make a bundle of dirty money. Others would be wise to forget it."

Gene Siskel of the Chicago Tribune gave the film zero stars out of four and called it "the most degenerate picture I have seen to play downtown ... Ilsa plays like a textbook for rapists and mutilation freaks." He identified the distributors of the film and advised them to "see it, because I'm certain they would then remove it."

Vincent Canby of The New York Times reported walking out on the film and wrote that it "could possibly be the worst soft-core sex-and-violence film of the decade—and the funniest. It's set in a World War II Nazi concentration camp built in a meadow that looks very southern California. You can almost hear the freeway traffic on the other side of the hill."

Dave Kehr of the Chicago Reader described the film as "self-conscious Canadian-made camp", which "wasn't notorious until it was fiercely denounced in the high-profile media".

The A.V. Club gave the film a scathing review, noting that it "has absolutely no sense of humor that might go where the obvious lack of moral purpose is".

== Accolades ==
Ten years after its initial release, Ilsa, She Wolf of the SS won Best Alternative Release at the 1985 AVN Awards.

== Legacy ==
Despite being critically derided, the film has a cult following, largely due to the lead character's endurance and Thorne's camp performance. Film scholar Rikke Schubart appraises the character as feminist, writing in Super Bitches and Action Babes: The Female Hero in Popular Cinema, 1970–2006, "she is not a female hero in any ordinary sense, yet she is a strong, active and aggressive protagonist who has become mythical in Western culture."

The character is a quintessential pop cultural depiction of sadomasochism and hypersexuality, with Schubart writing that "The uniform, the beautiful and harsh appearance, the fierce pride and the cold cruelty are all features of the dominatrix, who is here, quite literally, a 'castrating bitch.' She is a hypersexual creature, fully devoted to her job, and always in search of satisfaction."

== Sequels ==
Ilsa, She Wolf of the SS was followed by three sequels:

- Ilsa, Harem Keeper of the Oil Sheiks (1976) – the only sequel directed by Don Edmonds. The film is set in an unnamed Middle Eastern kingdom in modern times, with Ilsa as the overseer of a wealthy Sheikh’s harem.
- Ilsa, the Wicked Warden (1977) – directed by Jesús Franco. Wicked Warden was not originally an official entry in the series, instead being a European film starring Dyanne Thorne as a similar warden character named 'Greta'. When released in North America, the rights were purchased by the official Ilsa rights holders, who redubbed the film to rename the main character Ilsa and incorporate it as an official entry in the series. It is the only entry in the series to be produced in Europe.
- Ilsa, the Tigress of Siberia (also 1977) – directed by Jean LaFleur. The fourth and final entry is the only one shot on-location in Canada. It is unique among the series for its "two-act" structure, the first half depicting Ilsa as the commandant of a Siberian gulag in the Soviet Union, while the second half flashes-forward 20 years later to modern-day Montreal, where Ilsa is now the proprietor of a brothel on the run from Soviet authorities. This entry was produced by Ivan Reitman and Roger Corman under the shared alias "Julius Parnell".

None of these sequels have any story continuity with one another, depicting Ilsa in wildly differing locations and time period and often ending in her death or incapacitation.

== In popular culture ==
- In Jörg Buttgereit's 1989 horror film Der Todesking, a character rents a Nazisploitation movie called Vera – Todesengel der Gestapo (Vera, the Death-Angel of the Gestapo), which depicts a labor camp prisoner being castrated by an Ilsa-like prison guard.
- The 2007 film Grindhouse features a faux-trailer for a film called Werewolf Women of the S.S. by Rob Zombie, whose characters have been referred to as resembling Ilsa. The lead female officer, Eva Krupp (played by Zombie's wife, Sheri Moon), can also be seen as an Ilsa-like character.
- In the episode “Cicadas” of the second season of the Apple TV spy comedy-thriller series Slow Horses the main character, Jackson Lamb, is seen telling one of his agents "as much as I like the idea of you going all Ilsa, She Wolf of the SS on him" to back off confronting a Russian agent.
