= The Embryo Hunts in Secret =

The Embryo Hunts In Secret
- French release poster
- Directed by: Kōji Wakamatsu
- Written by: Masao Adachi
- Starring: Hatsuo Yamaya; Miharu Shima
- Cinematography: Hideo Itō
- Distributed by: Wakamatsu Productions
- Release date: July 1966
- Running time: 72 minutes
- Country: Japan
- Language: Japanese

The Embryo Hunts In Secret (胎児が密猟する時, Taiji ga Mitsuryō Suru Toki), released in July 1966, is the first film made by Japanese director Kōji Wakamatsu independently of any movie studio. It was released just months after he had left Nikkatsu and formed his own company, Wakamatsu Productions. At the time of its release Wakamatsu was quoted as saying "For me, violence, the body and sex are an integral part of life" which would predict the outcome and plot of the film.

== Plot summary ==
A mentally unstable man keeps his girlfriend tied up in his small apartment and tortures her. He prefers to keep her naked, and she is subjected to various types of bondage, whipped, and tortured with a razor blade. He also brushes her hair, and applies make-up on her, though, and as the film goes on he continues to have a mental breakdown due to his deteriorating sanity. In the end the girl gets free and has her revenge against him.

== Cast ==
- Hatsuo Yamaya (山谷初男)
- Miharu Shima (志摩みはる)

== Legacy ==
The film is said to be one of the "early examples of the stalker film".
