= Violated Angels =

- Film poster
- Directed by: Kōji Wakamatsu
- Written by: Masao Adachi; Jūrō Kara; Kōji Wakamatsu
- Produced by: Kōji Wakamatsu
- Starring: Jūrō Kara; Keiko Koyanagi; Miki Hayashi
- Cinematography: Hideo Itoh
- Edited by: Fumio Tomita
- Music by: Koji Takamura
- Distributed by: Wakamatsu Productions
- Release date: March 1, 1967 (Japan)
- Running time: 56 minutes
- Country: Japan
- Language: Japanese

Violated Angels (Japanese: 犯された白衣, Hepburn: Okasareta Hakui) is a film made by controversial Japanese director Kōji Wakamatsu in 1967. Wakamatsu's most famous film, it is based on the mass murder spree of Richard Speck in 1966.

== Plot ==
The film opens with a young man looking at pornographic magazines and practicing his shooting near the ocean.

During nighttime, in a nurses' rooming house, four nurses spy on two other nurses having sex. In the chaos, one of the voyeurs invites the young man, standing nearby outside, into the house to watch with them. However, the man suddenly shoots and kills one of the girls mid-coitus, terrifying the nurses. When one nurse attempts to escape, he chases after her. Hallucinating that the nurses are laughing at him, he shoots the nurse, killing her. Another nurse tries to appease the man by having sex with him. However, after another hallucination of the nurses mocking him, he shoots her in the anus, killing her.

The Head Nurse begs him to spare the remaining nurses at the expense of her own life. She wonders why the man is killing them, She suggests he targeted them because of a hatred of nurses or sexual frustration. She also reveals that she has a son in Katsuura, before begging the killer to spare her. She attempts to appeal to the societal honor towards nurses, whom she calls "angels in white dresses", and has another nurse dress up in her nurse outfit. In response, the killer ties both the Head Nurse and the outfitted nurse up, before flaying the latter alive. The Head Nurse frantically begs for her life, even revealing that she lied about having a son, before tearfully accepting her death. The man calls her an "angel whore" before shooting and killing her.

The sole remaining nurse asks why the man killed the other nurses. When he replies that he did so to "decorate" her with their blood, she responds that he could have simply used his own blood. To prove so, she bites his finger, releasing his blood. Satisfied, the man spares her. After he reveals he is from near the ocean, she sings the song "Song of the Conch" as the two have sex.

The film ends with shots of the man and the survivor nurse running across the oceanside, before fondling each other in the middle of the other nurses' corpses, which are arranged in a star formation resembling the Japanese flag. The nurse is gone, leaving the sleeping man, by the time the police raid the rooming house.

In the tradition of Wakamatsu's other Pinku eiga, there is much sexuality and nudity. However most of the actual murders take place off screen. Like other examples in Wakamatsu's work, the plot simplicity often feels like a "sadistic haiku".

== Cast ==
- Jūrō Kara as The Handsome Boy
- Keiko Koyanagi as The Head Nurse
- Miki Hayashi as Nurse A
- Shoko Kidowaki as Nurse B
- Makiko Saegusa as Nurse C
- Kyoko Yoyoi as Nurse D
- Michiko Sakamoto as The Young Girl
- Gusaku Satô as Riot Policeman
- Shûzô Tanaka as Riot Policeman
- Matajûrô Arafune as Riot Policeman
- Kentarô Aichi as Riot Policeman

== Production ==
The film was shot in black and white in just three days, probably much of it improvised and because of the low budget, many of the actresses were not professionals.

== Criticism ==
Like many films of this nature, Violated Angels was called anti-feminist and misogynistic by some critics. In Film As A Subversive Art, a book on underground cinema, Amos Vogel praises Wakamatsu's artistic talent, yet pans the film for its "...anti-feminist sadism which is not based on any ideological explanation and finally contributes misanthropic flavour to his work."
