= Ilsa, the Tigress of Siberia =

- DVD cover
- Directed by: Jean LaFleur
- Screenplay by: Marven McGara
- Produced by: Julian Parnell
- Starring: Dyanne Thorne; Michel Morin; Tony Angelo; Terry Coady; Howard Maurer
- Cinematography: Richard Ciupka
- Edited by: Debra Karen
- Production company: Mount Everest Enterprises
- Distributed by: Cinépix
- Release date: 1977
- Running time: 91 minutes
- Country: Canada
- Language: English
- Budget: CAD$250,000 (estimated)

Ilsa, the Tigress of Siberia is a 1977 Canadian sexploitation prison film that serves as the third sequel to Ilsa, She Wolf of the SS.

== Premise ==
Dyanne Thorne reprises her role as the title character, but in this installment, Ilsa, referred to as "Comrade Colonel," oversees a 1953 Soviet gulag in Siberia that mentally and physically breaks down male political prisoners in the waning days of Stalinism.

== Cast ==
- Dyanne Thorne as Ilsa
- Michel Morin as Andrei Chikurin
- Tony Angelo
- Terry Coady
- Howard Maurer as Ilsa's Lover
- Michel Maillot
- Jean-Guy Latour as Gregory

== Reception ==
The B-movie website Nanarland noted that the film offers in fact 2 films in one; the reviewer also found the film less "dirty” than its predecessor but ”sillier”.
