= Dyanne Thorne =

American actress (1936–2020)

- Thorne in Ilsa, Harem Keeper of the Oil Sheiks (1976)
- Born: Dorothy Ann Seib; October 14, 1936; Park Ridge, New Jersey, U.S.
- Died: January 28, 2020 (aged 83); Las Vegas, Nevada, U.S.
- Spouse: Howard Maurer (m. 1975)

Dorothy Ann Seib (October 14, 1936 – January 28, 2020), known professionally as Dyanne Thorne, was an American actress, stage performer and vocalist. She was known for her stage work in Las Vegas and as the lead actress in the Ilsa film franchise which began with Ilsa, She Wolf of the SS (1975).

== Early life and education ==
Born in Park Ridge, New Jersey as Dorothy Ann Seib and raised there primarily by her mother, she attended Park Ridge High School, where she was one of the feature writers on the school newspaper. After graduating, she attended New York University and took acting courses with Uta Hagen.

== Career ==
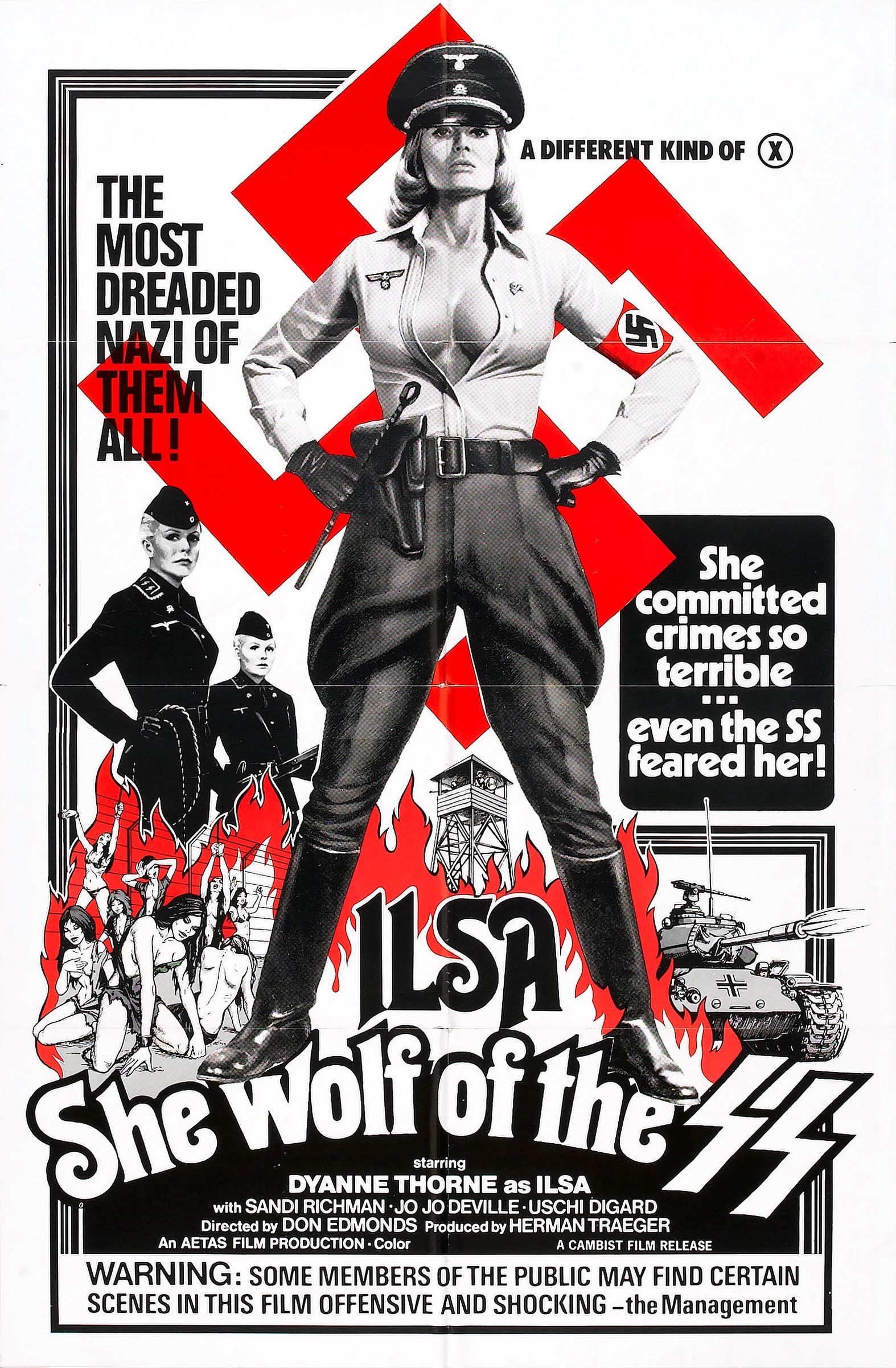
Thorne depicted on the poster of Ilsa, She Wolf of the SS

Dyanne Thorne began her career in show business as a band vocalist and New York stage actress. She also worked as a comedic sketch artist/talking foil. Comedy albums with Allen & Rossi, Vaughn Meader and Al Lohman & Roger Barkley earned her appearances on many TV variety shows such as The Tonight Show Starring Johnny Carson, The Red Skelton Show, The Steve Allen Show, The Merv Griffin Show and with Tim Conway at Caesars Palace hotel in Las Vegas. Filmed in New York City, Thorne's first major film role was in Norman Chaitin's short Encounter (1965), which was also an early screen credit for Robert De Niro. Moving to Hollywood to appear in Star Trek, and as villainess Andrea Hilliard in Crown International Pictures' thriller Point of Terror (1971) led to further film roles.

In 1975, Thorne married composer, conductor, musician and actor Howard Maurer. The couple subsequently starred in five films together, co-produced and starred in several Las Vegas Strip showroom productions and their careers took them around the world. As an actress, Thorne was known for her characterisation of the heinous international dominatrix and soldier of fortune Ilsa. After her debut as Ilsa in Ilsa, She Wolf of the SS (1975), she reprised the role in the sequels Ilsa, Harem Keeper of the Oil Sheiks (1976), Ilsa, the Tigress of Siberia and an unofficial entry Greta, the Mad Butcher (both 1977), the latter directed by Jess Franco.

== Later years ==
Thorne started but did not complete studies for a degree in anthropology. She claimed to have earned a degree in comparative religion over the course of ten years of study. As church ordained, non-denominational ministers by Science of Mind, Thorne and husband Maurer founded "A Scenic Outdoor Wedding" as an alternative to commercial chapel weddings.

Thorne died in Las Vegas on January 28, 2020 from pancreatic cancer at the age of 83.

== Filmography ==
=== Film ===
Year	Title	Role	Notes
1962	Lash of Lust	Claudia	
1964	Sin in the Suburbs	Yvette Talman	
1965	Encounter	Wicked Lady	
1971	Point of Terror	Andrea Hilliard	
1972	The Erotic Adventures of Pinocchio	Fairy Godmother	
1972	Blood Sabbath	Alotta	
1974	Snatched Woman	Kidnap Victim	
1975	Ilsa, She Wolf of the SS	Ilsa	
1975	The Swinging Barmaids	Boo-Boo	
1976	Beyond Fulfilment	Hostess	
1976	Ilsa, Harem Keeper of the Oil Sheiks	Ilsa	
1977	Chesty Anderson, USN	Nurse	
1977	Ilsa, the Wicked Warden	Ilsa	
1977	Ilsa, the Tigress of Siberia	Ilsa	
1979	Up Yours	Manicurist	
1985	Hellhole	Crysta	
1987	Real Men	Dad Pirandello	
2013	House of Forbidden Secrets	Greta Gristina	
2013	House of the Witchdoctor	Rose	
2018	Exploitation	Herself	
2019	Fascism on a Thread	Herself	

=== Television ===
Year	Title	Role	Notes
1966	The Felony Squad	Diana Porter / Miss Lucas	2 episodes
1968	Star Trek	First Girl	Episode: "A Piece of the Action"
1979	The Misadventures of Sheriff Lobo	Hooker	Episode: "Run for the Money"
1985	Space	Entertainer	Episode: "Part III"
