= Ilsa, Harem Keeper of the Oil Sheiks =

- Theatrical release poster
- Directed by: Don Edmonds
- Written by: Langston Stafford
- Produced by: Don Edmonds (as William J. Brody)
- Starring: Dyanne Thorne; Michael Thayer; Sharon Kelly; Haji Cat
- Cinematography: Glenn Roland; Dean Cundey
- Edited by: Idi Yanamar
- Production company: Mount Everest Enterprises
- Distributed by: Cinépix
- Release date: March 1976
- Running time: 85 minutes
- Country: Canada
- Language: English

Ilsa, Harem Keeper of the Oil Sheiks is a 1976 Canadian sexploitation women in prison film, the first sequel to Ilsa, She Wolf of the SS. The film was directed by Don Edmonds.

== Plot ==
Three crates arrive at the harem. Inside each is a gagged, buxom, chastity belt-wearing Western woman: the sole heiress of a "chain store king of the United States", a film actress dubbed "the new Scandinavian love goddess" in the media, and an Asian-European equestrian champion.

Sheikh El-Sharif lies in bed while his personal sex slave, Katsina, lovingly rubs her breasts against him. El-Sharif confirms his promise to let her accompany him on his travels the next day, starting after meeting with an American oil businessman, who is accompanied by an American Navy commander.

Ilsa, who manages the harem, promises luxury to the new women, but the women oppose their slavery. Ilsa, who herself has no lover, declines having a Western man kidnapped for her, stating she is repulsed by the notion of a man who would have sex with her just because he must.

Ilsa prepares them by forcing them to perform cunnilingus and erotic massage on one of her lesbian bodyguards. To satisfy the customers' fetish demands, Ilsa has an existing female sex slave force-fed, and then inspects two other consensually-fattened sex slaves. Silicone is used to enhance the buttocks of another.

A public auction is held to sell existing male and female sex slaves. When a belly dancer is caught spying, Ilsa uses a fiendish torture device to crush the belly dancer's large bare breasts. The victim reveals the American Commander sought inside information.

The Americans arrive. The businessman is offered a woman, but refuses. He later finds in a young male sex slave in his bedroom, who claims that refusal would mean severe punishment for him.

Ilsa immediately has an eye for the commander and dresses up. Crowding together on a couch near her bedroom, her lesbian bodyguard duo perform a make-out session, but he is uninterested. She insults his masculinity and he retaliates by groping her. She sends him away, but he shoves her into bed. She is angered at first, but eventually chooses to have sex with him.

Ilsa devises penetration-triggered, exploding diaphragms, using a mechanical dildo machine to demonstrate it on the belly dancer / spy, who dies. Sharif has one put in Katsina while she is unconscious, and then prepares her to visit a rival sheikh.

Sharif is about to have sex with the American heiress, when a vengeful local subject accidentally snipes her to death. The American commander disapproves when the sniper is burned to death without a trial.

Sharif finds the commander in bed with Ilsa. Sharif puts the commander in prison, then has Ilsa tied up. He orders a male leper to grope her large bare breasts, perform cunnilingus on her, then mount her and reach a climax while the others watch in horror.

Once she "learns her lesson", Ilsa initiates a rebellion. She frees the commander, killing his prison guard and a tarantula that has almost entered his face-cage. Ilsa reveals that Sharif's young nephew, Prince Salim, is locked up to prevent him inheriting the sheikhdom. Ilsa's bodyguard duo free the two remaining new sex slaves and give them guns. Sharif's guards kill Ilsa's bodyguards, but she captures Sharif and frees Prince Salim.

Sharif is chained and gagged. Ilsa tells his loving Katsina that Sharif's final wish before his execution is heaving pleasure with her, then removes Katsina's chastity belt. Knowing about her diaphragm-bomb, Sharif twists beneath his gag, but Katsina mounts and rapes him. Sharif tries to withhold himself, but Ilsa encourages Katsina to push herself harder on top of him, activating the bomb. The commander arrives just then, reminds Ilsa that Katsina was innocent, and dumps Ilsa in resentment.

Nevertheless, he reminds the prince that Ilsa did save his life, when she pledges her allegiance to him. Unimpressed, the prince sentences Ilsa to slow starvation and releases the commander to leave the country.

== Cast ==
- Dyanne Thorne as Ilsa
- Max Thayer as Commander
- Jerry Delony as Sheikh El-Sharif
- Uschi Digard as Inga Lindström
- Colleen Brennan as Nora Edward
- Haji as Alina Cordova
- Tanya Boyd as Satin
- Marilyn Joi as Velours
- Su Ling as Katsina
- Richard Kennedy as Kaiser
- George Buck Flower as Beggar
- Bobby Woods as Prince Salim

== Reception ==
The B-movie website Nanarland found the film disappointing and bordering the ludicrous.
