= Kōji Wakamatsu =

Japanese film director (1936–2012)

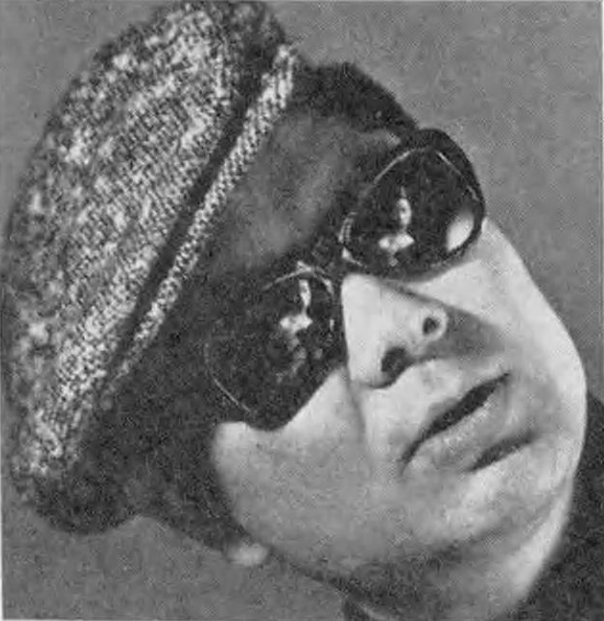
- Kōji Wakamatsu in 1967
- Born: Takashi Ito; 1 April 1936; Wakuya, Miyagi, Empire of Japan
- Died: 17 October 2012 (aged 76); Shinjuku, Tokyo, Japan
- Occupations: Film director, producer and screenwriter
- Years active: 1963–2012
- Movement: Pinku eiga

Kōji Wakamatsu (若松孝二, Wakamatsu Kōji; 1 April 1936 – 17 October 2012) was a Japanese film director who directed such pink films as Ecstasy of the Angels (天使の恍惚, Tenshi no Kōkotsu; 1972) and Go, Go, Second Time Virgin (ゆけゆけ二度目の処女, Yuke Yuke Nidome no Shojo; 1969). He also produced Nagisa Ōshima's controversial film In the Realm of the Senses (1976). He has been called "the most important director to emerge in the pink film genre," and one of "Japan's leading directors of the 1960s".

His 2010 film, Caterpillar, was nominated for the Golden Bear at the 60th Berlin International Film Festival.

== Early life ==
Kōji Wakamatsu was born in Wakuya, Miyagi, Japan on 1 April 1936, into a poor family of rice farmers. Wakamatsu worked in several menial jobs, namely as a construction worker, before becoming a yakuza, as "a member of the Yasuda-gumi clan in the Shinjuku ward of Tokyo". After his criminal experience, he began working in television until he was promptly fired after getting into an argument with a TV director. Subsequently, he debuted as a director with the Tokyo Kikaku produced pink film, Sweet Trap (Amai wana, 1963), towards which he contributed 150 million yen of his own money to the budget.

== Career ==
From 1963 to 1965, he directed 20 exploitation films for the studio, based on sensational topics of the day. He became interested in forming his own Pink Film company after the success of Tetsuji Takechi's 1964 Daydream. Nikkatsu submitted his Skeleton in the Closet (壁の中の秘事, Kabe no Naka no Himegoto) (also known as Secrets Behind the Wall) (1965) to the 15th Berlin International Film Festival while the film was still under review by Eirin, the Japanese film-rating board. This submission before passing Eirin's review was doubly embarrassing for the government since pink films, though already emerging as the dominant domestic cinematic genre, were not regarded as worthy of critical attention or international export. The film received an enthusiastic reception at the festival, but Nikkatsu, fearful of governmental retaliatory action, gave it a low-profile domestic release. Disappointed, Wakamatsu quit the studio to form his own company.

Wakamatsu's independent films of the late 1960s were very low-budget, but often artistically done works, usually concerned with sex and extreme violence mixed with political messages. Some critics have suggested that these films were an intentional provocation to the government, in order to generate free publicity resulting from censorship controversies. His films were usually produced for less than 1,000,000 yen (about $5,000), necessitating extreme cost-cutting measures including location shooting, single-takes, and natural lighting. His early films were usually in black and white with occasional bursts of color for theatrical effect.

His first self-produced film was The Embryo Hunts In Secret (胎児が密猟する時, Taiji ga Mitsuryō Suru Toki; 1966), a story of a man who kidnaps, tortures and sexually abuses a woman until she finally escapes and stabs him to death. Freeze-frames, flash-backs, hand-held camera and locations limited to two rooms and a hallway add to the film's disturbing, claustrophobic atmosphere. Vagabond of Sex (性の放浪, Sei no Hōrō; 1967) was a parody of Imamura's A Man Vanishes (1967). In Wakamatsu's film, a man leaves his family in Tokyo to travel and engage in various sexual escapades. When he returns home he finds out that his wife is starring in Imamura's documentary about her search for her missing husband.

Violated Angels (犯された白衣, Okasareta Hakui; 1967) was based on the murder of eight nursing students in the U.S. by Richard Speck. Dark Story of a Japanese Rapist (日本暴行暗黒史, Nihon Bōkō Ankokushi; 1969) was based on a serial rapist case in Japan after World War II. Go, Go Second Time Virgin (ゆけゆけ二度目の処女, Yuke yuke nidome no shojo; 1969) is loosely based on the Tate-LaBianca murders by the Manson Family in the same year. With Sex Jack (性賊, Seizoku; 1970), he tried "to show how the revolutionary movements are always infiltrated by the moles working for the government". One of his most critically esteemed films is Sacred Mother Kannon (聖母観音大菩薩, Seibo Kannon Daibosatsu; 1977), which has been called a "'text book example' for the use of metaphor and symbolism in contemporary cinema."

United Red Army (連合赤軍, Rengo Sekigun; 2008) was based on the "Asama-Sansō incident". Long and harsh, this movie includes a long documentary part about the political background that led to this tragedy and the self-destruction of the Japanese radical left.

While directing many successful and critically praised Pink Films, Wakamatsu also became known for giving young filmmakers their first experience in working in the industry. Among those whose early careers were helped by Wakamatsu are Banmei Takahashi, Genji Nakamura and Kan Mukai.

His 2010 film, Caterpillar, competed for the Golden Bear at the 60th Berlin International Film Festival.

In 2011, a new film on the last days of acclaimed novelist and political activist Yukio Mishima, focusing on the stream of events leading to the so-called Ichigaya incident of November 25, 1970, was announced as being on its stage of full completion. The film entitled 11.25 Jiketsu No Hi, Mishima Yukio To Wakamonotachi [11.25自決の日、三島由紀夫と若者たち] features Japanese actor Arata as Mishima. The film competed in the Un Certain Regard section at the 2012 Cannes Film Festival.

== Death ==
Wakamatsu died on 17 October 2012. He walked across a street, and was knocked over by a taxi in Tokyo on 12 October on his way home, after a budget meeting to discuss his next project, a movie about the Japanese nuclear lobby and Tepco.

== Partial filmography ==
English title	Japanese	Year
Sweet Trap	甘い罠	1963
Naked Shadow	恐るべき遺産 裸の影	1964
Lead Tombstone	鉛の墓標	1964
Frenzy	逆情	1964
Secrets Behind the Wall	壁の中の秘事	1965
The Embryo Hunts in Secret	胎児が密猟する時	1966
Vagabond of Sex	性の放浪	1967
Violated Angels	犯された白衣	1967
New Underground History of Japanese Violence: Vengeance Demon	復讐鬼	1968
Go, Go, Second Time Virgin	ゆけゆけ二度目の処女	1969
Dark Story of a Japanese Rapist	日本暴行暗黒史	1969
Running In Madness, Dying In Love	狂走情死考	1969
Naked Bullet	やわ肌無宿 男殺し女殺し or 裸の銃弾	1969
Violence Without A Cause	現代性犯罪絶叫篇 理由なき暴行	1969
Violent Virgin	処女ゲバゲバ	1969
Season of Terror	現代好色伝 テロルの季節	1969
Shinjuku Mad	新宿フーテン娘 乱行パーティー	1970
Sex Jack	性賊	1970
Sekigun PFLP: Declaration of World War	赤軍-PLFP 世界戦争宣言	1971
Secret Flower	秘花	1971
Ecstasy of the Angels	天使の恍惚	1972
100 Years of Torture: The History	拷問百年史	1975
Torture Chronicles Continue: 100 Years	女刑御禁制百年	1977
Sacred Mother Kannon	聖母観音大菩薩	1977
Serial Rapist	十三人連続暴行魔	1978
A Pool Without Water	水のないプール	1982
Ready to Shoot	われに撃つ用意あり	1990
Erotic Liaisons	エロチックな関係	1992
Singapore Sling	シンガポール・スリング	1993
Endless Waltz	エンドレス・ワルツ	1995
Perfect Education 6	完全なる飼育 赤い殺意	2004
United Red Army	連合赤軍	2008
Caterpillar	キャタピラー	2010
11.25 The Day He Chose His Own Fate	11・25自決の日 三島由紀夫と若者たち	2012
Petrel Hotel Blue	海燕ホテル・ブルー	2012
The Millennial Rapture	千年の愉楽	2012

== Sources ==
- Desser, David (1988). Eros Plus Massacre: An Introduction to the Japanese New Wave Cinema. Bloomington and Indianapolis: Indiana University Press. ISBN 0-253-31961-7.
- Hunter, Jack (1998). Eros In Hell: Sex, Blood And Violence In Japanese Cinema. UK: Creation Books. pp. 37–39. ISBN 1-871592-93-3.
- Kōji Wakamatsu at IMDb
- Mes, Thomas (December 4, 2007). "Koji Wakamatsu: Interview". www.midnighteye.com.
- Sato, Tadao (1982). Currents in Japanese Cinema. Gregory Barret (trans.). Tokyo: Kodansha International Ltd. ISBN 0-87011-815-3.
- Sedia Giuseppe Interview with Kōji Wakamatsu at Asia Express, (Italian), September 2007.
- "若松孝二 (Wakamatsu Koji)" (in Japanese). Japanese Movie Database.
- Weisser, Thomas; Yuko Mihara Weisser (1998). "Spotlight: The Pink Godfather: Koji Wakamatsu". Japanese Cinema Encyclopedia: The Sex Films. Miami: Vital Books: Asian Cult Cinema Publications. pp. 287–290. ISBN 1-889288-52-7.
- Watanabe, Rintarō (2009-01-27). "DVD Pickup 若松孝二 (Interview with Wakamatsu)" (in Japanese). Creators Movie Magazine.
- Sharp, Jasper (2008). Behind the pink curtain: The complete history of Japanese sex cinema. UK: FAB Press. pp. 79–130. ISBN 978-1-903254-54-7.
- Boari, Nicola (2012). Wakamatsu Koji, Il Piacere Della Distruzione. Italy: Falsopiano Edizioni. ISBN 978-8889782408.
- Crispim, Pedro (2022). "Kōji Wakamatsu: Alienation and the Womb", in Disegno V1/01_ Total Cinema: Film and Design.
