= Asheville-class gunboat (1917) =

United States Navy's Asheville-class gunboats

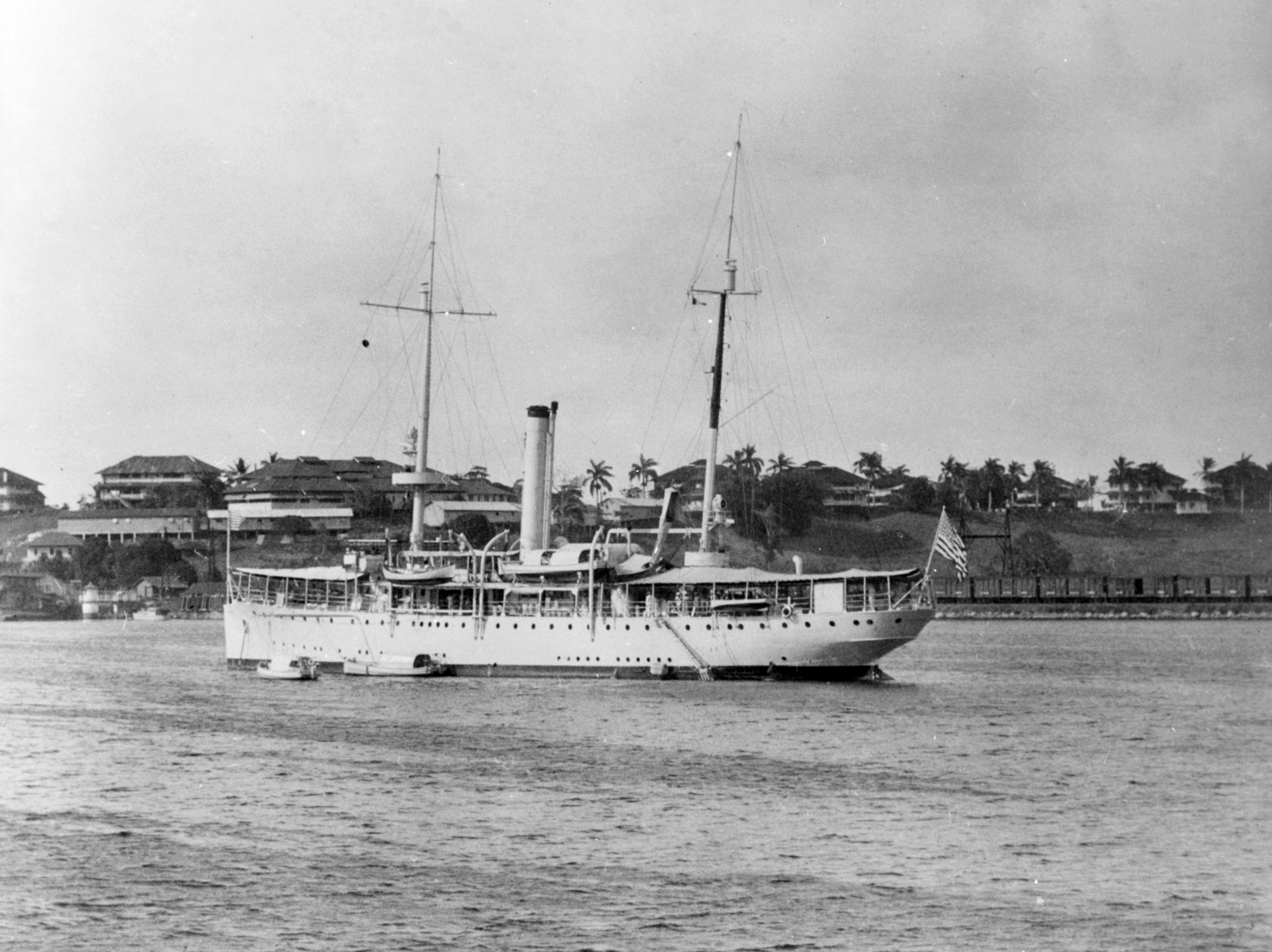
- Asheville, during her service in the Canal Zone.

Class overview
- Builders: Charleston Naval Shipyard, North Charleston, South Carolina
- Operators: United States Navy
- Preceded by: USS Sacramento
- Succeeded by: Erie class
- Built: 1917–1919
- In commission: 1920–1946
- Completed: 2
- Lost: 1
- Scrapped: 1

General characteristics
- Type: Gunboat
- Displacement: 1,575 long tons (1,600 t)
- Length: 241 ft 2 in (73.51 m)
- Beam: 41 ft 3 in (12.57 m)
- Draft: 11 ft 4 in (3.45 m)
- Propulsion: 3 × Thornycroft Bureau Modified steam boilers
- Speed: 12 knots (22 km/h; 14 mph)
- Complement: 159
- Armament: 3 × 4 in (102 mm)/50 caliber guns; 2 × 3-pounder guns; 2 × 1-pounder 37 mm (1.46 in) guns; 4 × .30 Lewis MG

The Asheville-class gunboat was a class of two gunboats, the Asheville and Tulsa, which was based on the USS Sacramento, an earlier gunboat. Laid down between 1917 and 1919, construction was completed in the early 1920s after which both ships were employed to project US naval power across several different theaters, including Central America and the Pacific, during the interwar years. Tulsa principally served in Asia, assigned variously with the South China Patrol, Yangtze Patrol, and the Inshore Patrol; Asheville mostly stayed in Central America, but did spend a few years on the South China Patrol alongside Tulsa. When war broke out with Japan in the Pacific, both ships were used to escort convoys. Asheville was lost during the war, but Tulsa survived to be broken up in the late 1940s. The class was awarded a total of three battle stars, one for Asheville and two for Tulsa.

== Design ==
=== Development ===
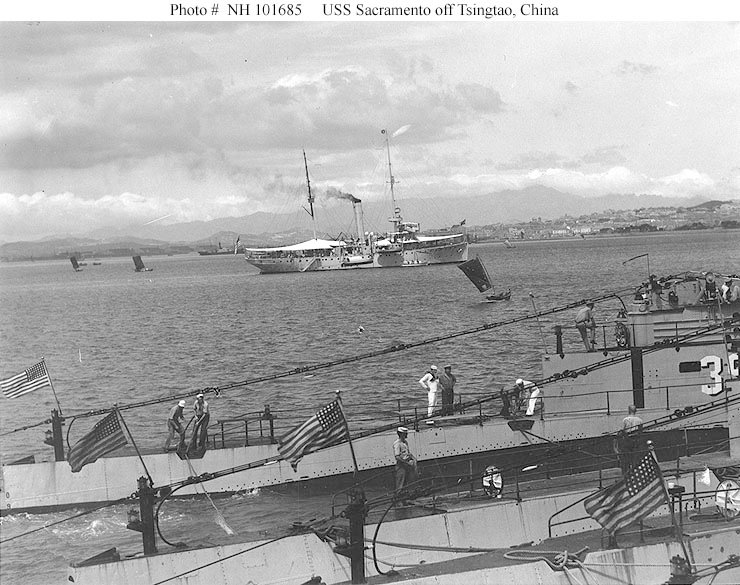
USS Sacramento (PG-19) off Tsingtao

The class' design was derived from Sacramento; which had been ordered in 1911 under the 1912 fiscal year. The US Navy was displeased with Sacramento, since budgetary limitations had produced a weakly armed vessel, carrying only three 4-inch (100 mm) guns compared to the ten 5 in (130 mm) guns of the Denver-class cruisers that had preceded her. In 1913, the General Board began preparing design requirements for the next gunboat, scheduled for the 1914 fiscal year; the board planned a vessel that had half the endurance of Sacramento—2,000 nautical miles (3,700 km; 2,300 mi) instead of 4,000 nmi (7,400 km; 4,600 mi)—a reduction that would afford the weight of a fourth gun. By April 1913, funding could not be secured for a gunboat in 1914, so the board requested it be built the following year, but now asked for an armament of six 5 in (130 mm) guns. The Bureau of Ordnance informed the General Board that the standard gun of that caliber, the 5"/51 caliber gun, was far too heavy, being two and a half times as heavy as the 4 in gun used aboard Sacramento. The board then requested the older and lighter 5"/40 caliber gun, but then agreed to the 4 in gun. Nevertheless, no gunboat was ordered for 1915.

In May 1914, the General Board reissued the previous year's request, albeit for a vessel armed with six 4 in guns, hoping to secure funding to build four vessels. Tensions in Central America increased the need for gunboats, which the Navy lacked in sufficient numbers. In October 1915, the design was finalized for what would be the gunboat of 1917; suggestions were solicited from Sacramento's commander now that he had experience with the vessel in service. He suggested that the new gunboat be lengthened by 15 feet (4.6 m), which would provide room for two additional boilers. He also requested an increase in displacement of 75 long tons (76 t) to accommodate a fourth gun. Operational experience during the Mexican Revolution demonstrated that Sacramento's 2 kW radio was too weak. Their endurance was to be doubled, so that they could steam for 8,000 nautical miles (15,000 km; 9,200 mi) at 10 knots (19 km/h; 12 mph). The General Board accepted these recommendations, with the exception of the fourth gun. The Bureau of Steam Engineering argued that four boilers would take up too much room, but three boilers that were slightly larger than those used in Sacramento would be possible. The first vessel, Asheville was authorized under the 1917 program, and a second, Tulsa, followed in 1918.

With the first vessel approved, the General Board attempted to secure two, or possibly three of the 5"/51-cal. guns in November, but the Bureau of Construction and Repair informed the board that only two guns would fit in the existing hull design. A third gun placed aft would be too close to the rudder, and the hull could not support the recoil from the gun. A substitution of the larger guns would also necessitate a reduction in the ammunition allotment, from 350 rounds per gun to 250. Ultimately, the Ashville class emerged as incremental improvements over Sacramento.

=== Characteristics ===
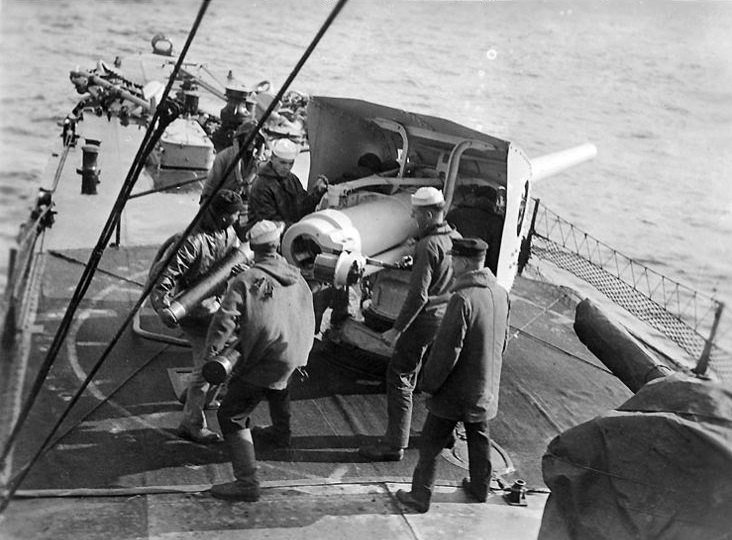
A 4-inch gun aboard the destroyer Little, the type carried by the Ashevilles

The Ashevilles were 225 feet (69 m) long at the waterline and 241 feet 2 inches (73.51 m) long overall. They had a beam of 41 feet 3 inches (12.57 m) and a draft of 11 feet 4 inches (3.45 m) at a displacement of 1,575 long tons (1,600 t) normally; their full load displacement increased to 1,760 long tons (1,790 t). The vessels had a flush deck and they were fitted with two masts. Each vessel had a crew of 159 officers and enlisted men.

Each vessel was powered by one Parsons geared turbine driving a single screw propeller. Steam for the turbine was provided by three coal-fired Thornycroft Bureau Modified boilers, which were vented into a single funnel located amidships. The ships' propulsion system was rated at 850 shaft horsepower (630 kW) and provided a top speed of 12 knots (22 km/h; 14 mph). The ships had a cruising radius of 2,000 nautical miles (3,700 km; 2,300 mi). Tulsa was one of the last US Navy ships to be given auxiliary sails to supplement her steam engines. In 1922, Asheville was converted to burn fuel oil in her boilers.

They were armed with three 4-inch (100 mm) 50-caliber guns in single mounts, one on the bow and two at the stern on the centerline. They also carried a battery of lighter weapons, including two 3-pounder 47 mm (1.9 in) guns, two 1-pounder (37 mm (1.46 in) guns and four .30 Lewis MGs. Tulsa later had a depth charge rack installed, giving her some manner of anti-submarine capacity.

== Ships ==
Ship	Hull no.	Builder	Laid down	Launched	Completed	Fate
Asheville	PG-21	Charleston; Navy Yard	9 June 1917	4 July 1918	6 July 1920	Sunk by Japanese warships, 3 March 1942
Tulsa	PG-22	Charleston; Navy Yard	9 December 1919	25 August 1922	3 December 1923	Struck 17 April 1946; Sold for scrap October 1946

== Service history ==
=== Pre-war ===
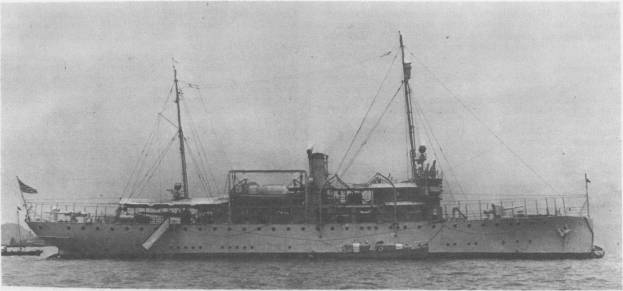
Tulsa while stationed in Hong Kong.

The two gunboats were built in the Charleston Navy Yard in North Charleston, South Carolina. Tulsa was sponsored by Dorothy V. McBirney, the daughter of a prosperous Tulsa banker, and Asheville was sponsored by Alyne J. Reynolds, the daughter of a wealthy Asheville doctor.

Tulsa spent her first five years in Central American waters showing the flag, projecting America's naval power among the Central American states. She was later involved in the civil strife in Nicaragua in the late 1920s during which bluejackets and marines from Tulsa helped maintain order ashore. Tulsa was involved in operations in Nicaragua from August 1926 to December 1928. On 1 April 1929, Tulsa was assigned as the flagship of the South China Patrol, which was based in Canton and Hong Kong, and patrolled the Pearl River and South China Sea. In June 1929, she was reassigned to a two-week deployment with the Yangtze Patrol. The following month she was reassigned to Tianjin, to gather intelligence, and reported it back to the Asiatic Fleet. In May 1941, she was reassigned to the Philippines, and joined the Inshore Patrol, which guarded the littoral zone of Manila Bay.

Asheville spent some time "showing the flag" in Central America and then transferred to the Middle East, forming part of the Asiatic Fleet in 1922. She also later served in the South China Patrol, but returned to Central America in 1929.

=== World War II ===
Tulsa served in the Pacific during World War II. The majority of her service was in escorting convoys, but she was also deployed in support of landings around Hollandia and the Wakde in New Guinea. She was attacked on 20 January 1943 by six Japanese bombers. In the short, sharp action which followed, the ship's crew utilized Tulsa's 3 in (76 mm) main gun and 20 mm (0.79 in) antiaircraft battery to drive off the attackers with no damage to their ship, while dodging 12 bombs. She was decommissioned on 6 March 1946, and then struck from the navy list on 17 April. In October 1946, she was turned over to the War Shipping Administration to be broken up. Her 300 lb (136.08 kg) bell was placed in the Naval and Marine Corps Training Center in Tulsa, and fell from its mooring in 1953. This incident led to research on the safety of such heavy bells being used.

Asheville also served in the Pacific during the war, seeing action during the Dutch East Indies campaign in the early stages of the war with Japan. On 1 March 1942, Tulsa, Lark, Isabel, and Asheville sailed out of Tjilatjap, and made for Australia. Asheville had engine difficulties during the voyage, which resulted in her being cornered and sunk by Arashi, Nowaki, and Maya on 3 March 1942, south of the island of Java, in what was Netherlands East Indies. Only one crewmember survived.
