= USS Tulsa (PG-22) =

Gunboat of the United States Navy

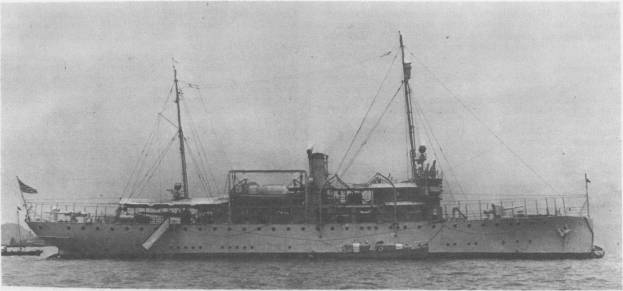
- USS Tulsa

History

United States
- Name: Tulsa
- Namesake: Tulsa, Oklahoma
- Builder: Charleston Navy Yard
- Laid down: 9 December 1919
- Launched: 25 August 1922
- Sponsored by: Miss Dorothy V. McBirney
- Commissioned: 3 December 1923
- Decommissioned: 6 March 1946
- Stricken: 17 April 1946
- Fate: Scrapped 1948

General characteristics
- Class & type: Asheville-class gunboat
- Displacement: 1,207 long tons (1,226 t) {standard}; 1,760 long tons (1,790 t) (full load)
- Length: 241 ft 2 in (73.51 m)
- Beam: 41 ft 3 in (12.57 m)
- Draft: 12 ft 9 in (3.89 m)
- Propulsion: 1-shaft coal-fired geared turbine
- Speed: 12 kn (14 mph; 22 km/h)
- Complement: 159
- Sensors & processing systems: GB Type 128 ASDIC added during 1942 refit at Sydney
- Armament: 3 × 4 in (100 mm)/50 cal gun mounts; 2 × 3-pounder guns; 2 × 1-pounder guns; 4 × .30 cal. Lewis machine guns
- Notes: Carries 2 portable 75mm landing/infantry guns

USS Tulsa (PG-22), nicknamed the Galloping Ghost of the South China Coast, was an Asheville-class gunboat of the United States Navy that was in commission from 1923 to 1946. She was named after the city of Tulsa, Oklahoma, and the county seat of Tulsa County.

== Service history ==
=== Construction and commissioning ===
Tulsa was laid down on 9 December 1919 at the Charleston Navy Yard; launched on 25 August 1922; sponsored by Miss Dorothy V. McBirney; (Note: Dorothy McBirney, the sponsor, was a daughter of prominent Tulsa banker James Hugh McBirney.) and commissioned there on 3 December 1923, Lieutenant Commander Robert M. Doyle Jr., in temporary command. Lt. Cdr. Doyle assumed his regular duties as executive officer on 14 December 1923 when Commander MacGillivray Milne assumed command.

=== Pre-World War II ===
Tulsa left Charleston Navy Yard on 19 January 1924, bound for the Caribbean to join the Special Service Squadron. She called at Key West, Florida, on 22 January, before proceeding to Baytown, Texas, where she took on fuel four days later.

The ship spent the next five years on station in Central American waters, "showing the flag" and calling at such places as Tuxpan and Vera Cruz, Mexico; Guantanamo Bay, Cuba; and at ports in Puerto Rico and the Canal Zone. In between cruises with the Special Service Squadron, she returned to Boston, Massachusetts, for yard repair work.

When civil strife broke out in Nicaragua in the late 1920s, details of Marines and bluejackets from Tulsa landed to protect lives and preserve property. Tulsa supported operation in Nicaragua from August 1926 to December 1928. When not engaged in these duties, the patrol gunboat conducted routine training exercises in waters near the Panama Canal Zone and visited ports in Honduras.

En route for the west coast late in 1928, Tulsa transited the Panama Canal as she prepared for duty in the Far East. She departed San Francisco, California, on 24 January 1929, called at Honolulu and Guam, and proceeded to Manila.

Designated flagship of the South China Patrol on 1 April, Tulsa operated out of Hong Kong, British Crown Colony; and Guangzhou, China, for cruises up the Pearl River and along the south China coast. At Guangzhou in May 1929, she witnessed the bombing of Chinese naval vessels by airplanes of the opposing faction in a Chinese civil war flaring at the time.

Relieved in June by Mindanao as flagship of the South China Patrol, she steamed up the coast to Shanghai, beginning a two-week deployment with the Yangtze Patrol in which she cruised as far upriver as Hankou. Assigned new duties as station ship at Tientsin in north China, Tulsa headed north in July 1929 to serve as a mobile source of information for the Commander in Chief, Asiatic Fleet (CINCAF).

She continued under the direct operational control of CINCAF into the 1930s, being later reassigned to the South China Patrol and observing conditions along the south China coast during the period following the outbreak of the undeclared Sino-Japanese war in July 1937. As tensions increased in the Orient in 1940 and 1941, Admiral Thomas C. Hart, CINCAF, incrementally reduced the Asiatic Fleet's presence in Chinese waters. Withdrawn to the Philippines in May 1941, Tulsa joined the Inshore Patrol, guarding the sea approaches to Manila Bay.

=== World War II ===
On 10 December 1941, two days after the outbreak of war in the Philippines, a heavy Japanese air attack devastated Cavite, the base of the Asiatic Fleet, near Manila. Standing in from the Corregidor minefields, Tulsa anchored off the burning base as the last Japanese planes departed. She called away all of her boats and sent fire and rescue parties ashore to bring off what wounded could be rescued from the holocaust. At 19:00, she recalled all hands that were ashore; and, within hours, Tulsa, Asheville, Lark, and Whippoorwill retired toward Balikpapan, Borneo.

After a brief stay at that port, she called at Makassar before receiving orders to proceed to Surabaya, Java, in the Netherlands East Indies, where she spent Christmas. Then, steaming independently, she cruised to Tjilatjap, on the south coast of Java, where her landing force began to receive training in jungle warfare. The plan to use Tulsa's bluejackets as infantry in a last-ditch defense of Java never progressed beyond the initial training stage, and her erstwhile ground troops returned to the ship as she was being outfitted to become a convoy escort vessel.

Equipped with a home-made depth charge rack constructed by the ship's crew, Tulsa now boasted an antisubmarine capacity and began escorting merchantmen along the south coast of Java to Tjilatjap, the only port on the island still out of reach of Japanese bombers. While engaged on convoy duty in late February, Tulsa received orders to proceed to a point 300 mi (260 nmi; 480 km) to the south of Java. En route, she learned that her mission included searching for survivors of the seaplane tender Langley, sunk on 26 February 1942. When she arrived at the scene, however, she found only traces of wreckage, but no survivors. Unbeknownst to Tulsa, Langley's survivors had already been rescued by USS Whipple (DD-217) and Edsall.

After this apparently fruitless rescue attempt, Tulsa came upon the scene of the sinking of British merchant ship City of Manchester. Whippoorwill already had begun rescue operations, yet needed medical facilities which Tulsa had on board. The gunboat hove to and assisted the minesweeper in the lifesaving, then returned to Tjilatjap, where she awaited instructions, ready for sea at a moment's notice.

With Java being rapidly encircled by the onrushing Japanese, orders to retire were not long in coming. On 1 March 1942. Tulsa, Asheville, Lark, and Isabel crept out of Tjilatjap, bound for Australia. While the other three ships steamed resolutely onward, Asheville soon developed engine difficulties and fell behind, only to be trapped and sunk by superior Japanese surface forces.

Tulsa and her two companions arrived in Australian waters shortly thereafter. They were the last surface ships of the Asiatic Fleet to survive the Japanese onslaught in the East Indies; and they escaped, by a hairsbreadth, the fate which befell Asheville.

For the seven months following her arrival in Fremantle, she engaged in routine patrols off the Australian coast before being refitted at Sydney in October 1942. Here, she received British ASDIC, degaussing equipment, Y-gun, and Oerlikon 20 mm anti-aircraft autocannons. Thus outfitted, she served once again as a convoy escort, occasionally towing targets as well.

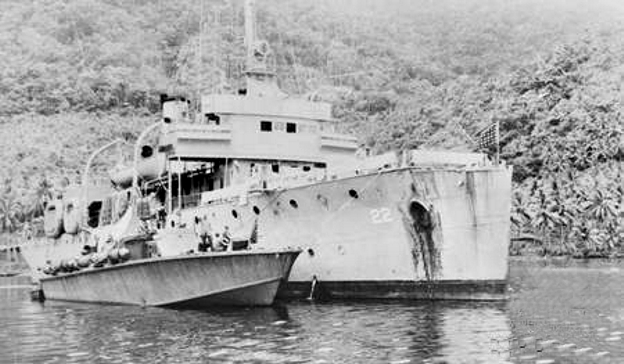
Tulsa with a PT boat at Milne Bay, February 1943.

In the latter half of 1942, she was attached to Submarine Forces, Southwest Pacific, and operated independently out of Brisbane as a target for the submarines out of Fremantle. She then gave submariners practice in making approaches and battle surfacing. With the beginning of the Buna-Gona offensives in New Guinea, Tulsa escorted PT boats to take part in that campaign and operated between Milne Bay, New Guinea, and Cairns, Australia. When the PT boat base at Kana Kopa, on the southeastern shores of Milne Bay, was established in November 1942, Tulsa brought in much-needed equipment to aid in the operations being-conducted from that base. But five days before Christmas 1942, Tulsa grounded on an uncharted pinnacle and damaged her ASDIC gear, necessitating a return to yard facilities for repairs.

Soon returning to the war zone, she resumed patrols off Milne Bay. On the night of 20 January 1943, six Japanese bombers attacked the ship. In the short, sharp action which followed, Tulsa put up a spirited defense with her 3-inch and 20 mm guns antiaircraft battery, driving off the attackers with no damage to herself, while dodging 12 bombs.

For the remainder of 1943, she continued operating in the New Guinea-Australian area, tending PT boats, escorting supply ships, and serving as flagship of the 7th Fleet. On one occasion while serving as a PT boat tender, Tulsa towed PT-109, later commanded by future U.S. president Lt. (jg.) John F. Kennedy, USNR.

After a major overhaul in December 1943, she resumed operations in the Milne Bay-Cape Cretin area. She departed the bay on 8 January 1944, with a fuel barge in tow, en route to Cape Cretin. There, she joined HMAS Arunta, LST-453, and SS Mulcra, to serve as headquarters ship for Capt. Bern C. Anderson, Commander, Task Unit 76.5.3 (TU 76.5.3).

Under the control of Commander, Escorts and Mine-craft Squadrons, 7th Fleet, she served in the Finschafen-Buna area and participated in the Hollandia strike on 26 April and the Wakde landing on 17 May. She then continued in her role of escort vessel and patrol craft in the New Guinea-Australia area before proceeding to the Philippines in November 1944.

Returning to the scene of her hurried departure nearly four years before, Tulsa continued operations with the 7th Fleet in the Philippines.

== Renaming and decommissioning ==
On 18 December 1944, she was renamed Tacloban, after a town on the island of Leyte, where American forces had landed a scant two months earlier, freeing the name Tulsa to be used for the planned USS Tulsa (CA-129).

As the U.S. Navy swept northward towards the Japanese home islands, and fierce fighting ensued on Okinawa and Iwo Jima, Tacloban performed the necessary tasks of convoy escort and local patrol vessel at fleet anchorages. On 26 August 1945, she was detached from duty with the Local Defense Force, Macajalar Bay, on the northwestern coast of Mindanao, and sent to Leyte. Arriving a week later, she received orders to accompany USCGC Ingham (WPG-35) and LCI-230 to Buckner Bay, Okinawa.

On 7 September, en route to her destination, Tacloban was slowed by an overheated bearing, and her speed dropped to 3.1 kn (3.6 mph; 5.7 km/h). Left to proceed in company with LCI-230, Tacloban limped into Buckner Bay on 13 September. Task Force 74 (TF 74), to which she had been attached, sailed for Shanghai, China, two days later; but Tacloban, an "Old China Hand," could not make the trip and remained at Buckner Bay.

Following voyage repairs, she continued across the Pacific and arrived at Pearl Harbor on 18 December 1945. Thirteen days later, she headed for the California coast and arrived at San Francisco, on 10 January 1946.

Aged and worn, Tacloban was decommissioned on 6 March; struck from the Navy list on 17 April; and turned over to the War Shipping Administration, Maritime Commission on 12 October for disposal.

== Awards ==
- Second Nicaraguan Campaign Medal
- Yangtze Service Medal
- China Service Medal
- American Defense Service Medal with "FLEET" clasp
- Asiatic-Pacific Campaign Medal with three battle stars
- World War II Victory Medal
- Philippine Defense Medal with star
- Philippine Liberation Medal with two stars
- Philippine Independence Medal
