= Tulsa (disambiguation) =

Tulsa is a city in Oklahoma, United States.

Tulsa may also refer to:

- Tulsa (film), 1949 film starring Susan Hayward and Robert Preston
- USS Tulsa, the name of two U.S. Navy ships, a gunboat and a never-built cruiser
- Tulsa (book), a photo collection by Larry Clark
- Tulsa, a female professional wrestler from the Gorgeous Ladies of Wrestling
- University of Tulsa, a private university in the city of Tulsa
  - Tulsa Golden Hurricane, the athletic teams for the university
- "Tulsa", a song by Billy Joe Royal
- "Tulsa", a song written and recorded by Rufus Wainright from his album Release the Stars
- Tulsa, a moth genus in the family Pyralidae
