= USS Whippoorwill (AM-35) =

Minesweeper of the United States Navy

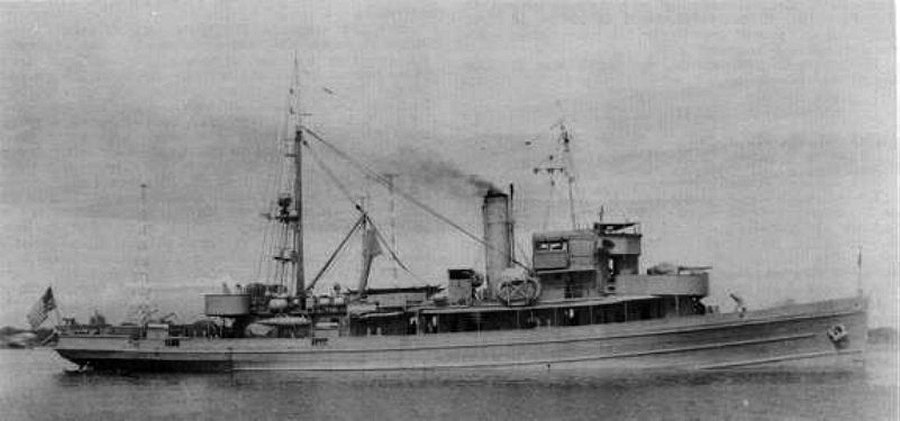

History

United States
- Ordered: as Minesweeper No. 35
- Laid down: 12 December 1917
- Launched: 4 July 1918
- Commissioned: 1 April 1919
- Decommissioned: 17 April 1946
- Stricken: 10 June 1946
- Fate: Most likely scrapped

General characteristics
- Displacement: 840 tons
- Length: 187 ft 10 in (57.25 m)
- Beam: 35 ft 5 in (10.80 m)
- Draught: 8 ft 10 in (2.69 m)
- Propulsion: not known
- Speed: 15 knots
- Complement: 66
- Armament: none

USS Whippoorwill (AM-35) was a Lapwing-class minesweeper of the United States Navy.

The first Whippoorwill to be so named by the Navy, Minesweeper No. 35 was laid down on 12 December 1917 at Mobile, Alabama, by the Alabama Drydock and Shipbuilding Company; launched on 4 July 1918; sponsored by Miss M. I. Evans; and commissioned on 1 April 1919.

== World War I mine clearance ==
After fitting out, Whippoorwill departed Boston, Massachusetts, on 3 July 1919, bound for Scotland. Operating subsequently from the port of Kirkwall, the minesweeper participated in the clearing of the North Sea Mine Barrage as part of Division 3, Minesweeping Squadron, Atlantic Fleet. This was completed by late autumn of 1919.

== Post-war transfer to the Pacific Fleet ==
Returning to the United States in November 1919, Whipporwill was later assigned to the U.S. Pacific Fleet. Having been classified as AM-35 on 17 July 1920, the minesweeper arrived at Pearl Harbor, her new home port, on 1 March 1921. She would operate out of that base for the next 20 years, with brief periods spent as station ship at Pago Pago, Samoa, between 1931 and 1934.

Whippoorwill's prime duty was service to the Fleet. Besides filling the role for which she was designed—sweeping and laying mines—upon occasion she towed targets and plane-guarded.

== Performing surveys in the Pacific ==
In the early 1920s she participated in surveys of various and sundry Pacific islands. In July 1923,Whippoorwill together with her sister-ship Tanager (AM-5) accomplished the first survey of Johnston Island in modern times. During that cruise, she carried members of the Tanager Expedition, a joint expedition sponsored by the U.S. Department of Agriculture and the Bishop Museum of Hawaii. She also carried a Douglas DT-2 floatplane on her fantail, hoisting it into the water so that it could take off for aerial survey and mapping flights over Johnston.

Whippoorwill made other cruises, carrying members of ornithological surveys to islands such as Kingman Reef, Palmyra, Christmas Island, Jarvis Island, Howland Island, and Baker Island.

== Whippoorwill modernized in 1941 ==
The minesweeper departed Pearl Harbor on 5 May 1941, bound for the Asiatic Fleet. En route, the minecraft plane-guarded at prearranged stations, serving as a direction-finding station for patrol planes flying to the Philippines to reinforce the Asiatic Fleet's air wing—Patrol Wing 10.

After touching briefly at Guam, in the Marianas, on 23 May, Whippoorwill reached Manila on the 30th. There, she became part of Mine Division 9, Mine Squadron 3, Asiatic Fleet. In the ensuing months, Whippoorwill performed a variety of service tasks. She towed targets for the cruisers and destroyers of the Fleet to fire at during battle practices and gunnery shoots, assisted in unmooring and mooring the Fleet's submarine and destroyer tenders from buoys, and conducted similar activities.

== Philippine operations ==
That spring, Whippoorwill operated with Canopus (AS-9) during maneuvers in the southern Philippines, touching at Zamboanga and steaming in the Sulu Sea, before returning to Cavite and anchoring in Canacao Bay. Soon thereafter, she commenced operations with the Inshore Patrol. Whippoorwill operated on patrol duties and laid mines—laying the field near Caballo Island, near Corregidor, at the entrance to Manila Bay. She and Tanager also laid the mine field at Subic Bay while operating out of the section base at Olongapo.

After an overhaul at Cavite and at the Verdadero Dockyard across Canacao Bay from Cavite, Whippoorwill took up patrol duties in the late autumn, frequently alternating with the gunboats Asheville (PG-21) and Tulsa (PG-22). On 22 November, while on patrol station "Cast," she fired four shots across the bow of the sailing vessel Remedio VIII before the vessel hove to. She later prevented the Army tug Harrison from entering the area and warned off other vessels on the 26th and 28th.

== Japanese attack on Pearl Harbor ==
Relieved by Tulsa on station on 30 November, Whippoorwill returned to Canacao Bay before she got underway on 3 December for sweeping operations out of Cavite.

At 04:15 on 8 December, Whippoorwill received the news of the attack on Pearl Harbor. The ship's commanding officer, soon called his crew to quarters and announced the news. Within hours, Whippoorwill was underway, commencing her first wartime sweeping operations in Manila Bay.

=== Under air attack in the Philippines ===
At 12:30 on 10 December, the air raid alert was broadcast at Cavite. At 12:50, Whippoorwill weighed anchor and stood out to maneuver in Manila Bay, away from the confining waters near Cavite itself. Soon the enemy's high-level bombers were droning overhead, above the effective range of the navy yard's 3-inch batteries; every ship in the harbor opened up with their antiaircraft batteries. In the ensuing action, Whippoorwill claimed assists in splashing two bombers and sending another one crashing on shore nearby.

=== Peary struck by Japanese bombs ===
Peary (DD-226) alongside Central Wharf for an overhaul was hit by a bomb that struck the foremast, snapping it off above the searchlight platform and sending shards of metal down onto the bridge and fire-control platform, killing or wounding nearly every man there—including the commander and his executive officer. Meanwhile, bombs blasted and set afire the torpedo warehouse across the wharf; warheads exploded and burned.

Comdr. Ferriter saw Peary's predicament and moved his ship through the burning navy yard and eased Whippoorwill near the destroyer's stern and passed a towline. Braving the burning firebrands from the blazing warehouse, the destroyermen made fast the line, and the minesweeper commenced backing. The towline stretched taut—only to part! Twice more Ferriter's command closed the immobile destroyer, both ships endangered by warheads detonating nearby. Finally, on the third try, the line held; and, with debris showering upon the minesweeper and her crippled charge, Whippoorwill pulled Peary free.

=== Whippoorwill pulls Peary out of danger ===
Soon thereafter, Whippoorwill moored Peary to a buoy in Manila Bay and took the destroyer's wounded to the hospital at Sangley Point in her motor launch. Later that evening, the minesweeper unmoored from the destroyer and stood out, anchoring for the night farther out in Manila Bay.

=== Whippoorwill escapes to Borneo ===
With Philippine waters vulnerable for surface ships, those ships of the Asiatic Fleet that could do so sailed for points south. Whippoorwill headed for Borneo on 12 December and arrived at Balikpapan on the 15th. Four days later, the minecraft—in company with Tulsa, Asheville, and Lark (AM-21)—joined Task Force (TF) 7 and withdrew further south to the Celebes, arriving the next day. Later, Whippoorwill screened Tulsa as the two ships proceeded for Java.

Arriving at Surabaya, three days before Christmas of 1941, Comdr. Ferriter went ashore and reported for orders to the Dutch naval commander there. Three days later, the minesweeper commenced local patrols and sweeps out of Surabaya and continued that duty into February 1942, often operating in company with Dutch units, before she received orders to move to Tjilatjap, a port on Java's south coast.

=== Searching for Langley’s survivors ===
Arriving early on 26 February, Whippoorwill and Lark put to sea at 14:00 the next day to search for survivors of the seaplane tender Langley (AV-3), reportedly sunk south of Java. Three hours out of Tjilatjap, the minesweeper's lookouts sighted a strange vessel and altered course to close and identify her. The mysterious ship turned out to be Tulsa, also searching for Langley survivors.

The trio of ships continued their search, the minesweepers steaming independently of the gunboat. At 22:29, Whippoorwill and Lark arrived in the area in which Langley had been reported lost, passed a large oil slick, and smelled a strong odor of gasoline and oil—mute testimony to the tragedy that had gone before.

=== Rescuing survivors of the SS City of Manchester ===
On the following day, the last day of February, the minesweepers abandoned their search and were about to put about to return to Tjilatjap. At 05:07, however, lookouts noted a pulsating fire on the horizon; and the minesweepers closed cautiously. The burning vessel turned out to be the British merchantman City of Manchester—of the Ellerman Line—that had been torpedoed and gunned by the Japanese submarine I-153. Whippoorwill lowered a boat at 05:50 and rescued the British sailors from their rafts and life boats. Ten injured men were transferred to Tulsa, which had also arrived on the scene of the rescue—the gunboat having a well-equipped sick bay that the minesweepers lacked.

Following that rescue mission, Whippoorwill returned to Tjilatjap, arriving on 1 March, only to stand out later that day as Java, too, was becoming more untenable with each passing hour. Subsequently Whippoorwill crept southward towards Australia.

=== Whippoorwill makes it to Australia ===
Whippoorwill dropped anchor at Fremantle on 9 March and operated out of Fremantle into May before she shifted to Albany. The minesweeper conducted local patrols and guardship operations in the shipping channels and harbors there from mid-May to late August when she returned to Fremantle. For the remainder of 1942, Whippoorwill operated alternatively at Exmouth Bay, Albany, or Fremantle, patrolling locally and towing targets. On occasion, she acted as reference vessel for submarines of the Southwest Pacific forces on their training cruises. The beginning of 1943 found Whippoorwill engaged in local patrol operations out of Exmouth Gulf, and she continued that duty until February, when she made another brief visit to Fremantle. On 18 and 19 February 1943, she engaged in night exercises with American submarines on maneuvers. Six days later, while underway off the coast, she encountered a cyclone which wrenched two 300-pound depth charges from their tracks.

=== Antisubmarine action ===
After returning to Exmouth Gulf, she remained there through March 1943 before sailing for Fremantle and a six-day drydocking period. Upon completion of this brief refit, she returned to Exmouth Gulf on 24 April and conducted minesweeping operations in the area. On 15 May, while en route to Fremantle, she picked up an echo with her sonar gear and came to general quarters. She dropped depth charges but lost the contact. Arriving at Fremantle two days later, 17 May, she commenced a series of antisubmarine patrols which lasted into November.

=== Reclassified as an ocean-going tug ===
On 1 December, she began an extensive refit. During the yard work, she was reclassified an ocean-going tug and redesignated AT-169 on 1 March 1944. The long overhaul was completed on 5 March, and the ship proceeded to Brisbane.

Coming under the operational control of Commander, Service Force, 7th Fleet, Whippoorwill arrived at Brisbane on 20 March. For the next 10 days, 21 to 31 March 1944, she underwent final conversion to an ocean-going tug. This involved the removal of her minesweeping gear and the addition of a heavy-duty towing engine which had once been fitted on board Dobbin (AD-3).

=== New Guinea operations ===
On 8 April, the newly refitted Whippoorwill with LST-385 under tow, got underway for New Guinea, and arrived at Milne Bay with her charge on 15 April. The tug then served Hollandia and at Mios Woendi; also receiving orders to Seeadler Harbor, in the Admiralty Islands, to serve on "battle-damage standby" duty—prepared to take any battle-damaged ships under tow and out of the front lines.

=== Philippine Islands operations ===
Whippoorwill was reclassified an ocean-going tug, old, on 15 May 1944 and designated ATO-169. She then continued operations off New Guinea and in the backwater areas of the war in the Pacific until receiving orders to head north for Leyte in February 1945. Later operating at Hollandia and Ulithi, Whippoorwill resumed operations in the Philippine Islands on 15 June 1945 and served as a harbor tug in the Manila Bay area through the end of the war.

Touching at Leyte Gulf, Manila Bay, Zamboanga, and Samar, Whippoorwill finally rounded out her tour in the Philippine Islands on 20 December, when she departed Samar, bound for the Marshall Islands. Arriving at Eniwetok in company with Vireo (ATO-144) and Rail (ATO-139), she departed that island on 4 January 1946, bound for Pearl Harbor, arriving at the Pacific base that had once long served as her home port on the 15th. After a 10-day stay, Whippoorwill in company with Rail, got underway again on 25 January, and headed for San Francisco, California.

== Post-war inactivation and decommissioning ==
Arriving there on 5 February 1946, Whippoorwill soon began preparation for inactivation and, on 17 April 1946, the ship was decommissioned at San Francisco, California. Struck from the Navy list on 10 June 1946, she was turned over to the Maritime Commission for disposal on 6 November 1946.

== Military awards and honors ==
Whippoorwill was awarded one battle star for her World War II service.
