= Wassup Rockers =

- Directed by: Larry Clark
- Written by: Larry Clark; Matthew Frost
- Produced by: Larry Clark; Kevin Turen; Henry Winterstern
- Starring: Jonathan Velasquez; Francisco Pedrasa; Milton Velasquez; Yunior Usualdo Panameno; Eddie Velasquez; Luis Rojas-Salgado; Carlos Velasco
- Cinematography: Steve Gainer
- Edited by: Alex Blatt
- Release dates: September 12, 2005 (Toronto Film Festival); June 23, 2006 (United States)
- Running time: 111 minutes
- Country: United States
- Languages: English; Spanish
- Box office: $634,074

Wassup Rockers is a 2005 American drama film, written, produced, and directed by Larry Clark.

== Plot ==
Wassup Rockers is about a group of Guatemalan American and Salvadoran American teenagers in South Los Angeles who, instead of conforming to the hip hop culture of their gang-infested neighborhood, wear tight pants, listen to punk rock, and ride skateboards. Avoiding the violence of their dangerous home turf is an everyday challenge. The climax of the film occurs out on a skate-ride around Beverly Hills, California. Racial tension fumes the air of Beverly Hills as the group of skaters manage to continually run into trouble. Janice Dickinson makes an appearance in the film as a rich alcoholic divorcee and former soap opera actress whose Spanish-speaking maid helps Los Rockers. Fashion designer Jeremy Scott appears as a photographer.

== Cast ==
- Jonathan Velasquez as Jonathan
- Francisco Pedrasa as Kiko
- Milton Velasquez as Milton
- Usualdo Panameno as Porky
- Eddie Velasquez as Eddie
- Luis Rojas-Salgado as Louie
- Carlos Velasco as Carlos
- Iris Zelaya as Iris
- Ashley Maldonado as Rosalia
- Laura Cellner as Jade
- Jessica Steinbaum as Nikki
- Jeremy Scott as Andre

== Critical response ==
The film currently holds a 37% "rotten" score on Rotten Tomatoes based on 52 reviews, with the consensus reading "As usual with Clark's films, the fixation on kids is rather creepy, plus the plot eventually runs off the rails into camp." On Metacritic, the film has a score of 56 based on 23 critics, indicating mixed or average reviews. Film critic Roger Ebert gave Wassup Rockers a "thumbs up" rating on the television show Ebert & Roeper. In contrast, his co-host, Richard Roeper, gave the movie a "thumbs (way) down", emphasizing Larry Clark's apparent fascination with shirtless, adolescent males. Roeper argued, "When a colleague told me I was about to see a new film from Larry Clark, the director of Bully and Kids, I said, 'I wonder how many scenes will pass before we get shirtless teenage boys?' That's one of Clark's rather disturbing obsessions." Ebert ultimately gave the film 3 out of 4 stars on his website.

== See also ==
- Kids (1995, Larry Clark)
- Bully (2001, Larry Clark)
- Ken Park (2002, Larry Clark)
