= Tiffany Limos =

American actress (born 1980)

- Born: January 31, 1980 (age 46); Dallas, Texas, U.S.
- Occupation: Actor
- Notable work: Peaches in Ken Park

Tiffany Limos (born January 31, 1980) is an American actress known for her role as Peaches in the 2002 film Ken Park. Limos made her acting debut in 2002 with the film Teenage Caveman. By 2003, Limos had also written three scripts. In 2007, Limos was honored at the Cinemanila Film Festival by then-President of the Philippines Gloria Macapagal Arroyo. Limos also tributed the Cannes Directors' Fortnight at the Cinemanila Film Festival, she honored Olivier Pere the President of the Cannes Directors' Fortnight. Limos and film critic Elvis Mitchell interview Limos in the documentary New York Conversations in 2010.

== Early life ==
Tiffany Limos was born around Dallas, Texas.

== Career ==
At 16, Limos began modeling for the Ford agency and appeared in teen magazines like Sassy and YM. She subsequently quit modeling and worked as a hostess at the Coffee Shop in Manhattan's Union Square. She worked at Visionaire and "V" magazine as a creative consultant in 1999. That same year Limos wrote a script for Larry Clark called American Girl From Texas that Clark has often cited as his dream project.

In 2012, Limos appeared in Raya Martin's film The Great Cinema Party which was a part of that year's Jeonju Digital Project. In 2013, directed Academy Award Winning Director Michel Gondry for Nowness.com Limos collaborated with Michel Gondry for a decade and helped him on such projects as Dave Chappelle's Block Party, The Science of Sleep, and produced a video for Kanye West called Heard 'Em Say. Limos apprenticed and worked for Larry Clark, Quentin Tarantino, Michel Gondry, Woody Allen, and Spike Lee.

== Filmography ==
- New York Conversations (2010)
- The Thorn in the Heart (2009)
- Untitled Kanye West Project (2007 film)
- Friendly Fire (2006)
- Dave Chappelle's Block Party (2006)
- Sueño (2005)
- Larry Clark, Great American Rebel (2003)
- Ken Park (2002)
- Teenage Caveman (2002)
