= All About Us (TV series) =

2001 American comedy-drama television series

- Genre: Comedy drama
- Created by: Lois Bromfield
- Developed by: Pamela Pettler; Chad Hodge
- Starring: Alecia Elliott; Marieh Delfino; Crystal Grant; Alicia Lagano
- Theme music composer: Alecia Elliott
- Composers: John Adair; Steve Hampton
- Country of origin: United States
- Original language: English
- No. of seasons: 1
- No. of episodes: 13

Production
- Executive producer: Peter Engel
- Producers: Terry Maloney Haley; Al Sonja L. Rice
- Camera setup: Multi-camera
- Running time: 22–24 minutes
- Production companies: Peter Engel Productions; NBC Enterprises

Original release
- Network: NBC
- Release: August 4 – November 10, 2001

All About Us is an American teen sitcom series that aired on NBC during the network's TNBC lineup from August 4 to November 10, 2001. It was produced by Peter Engel Productions. The series' premiere episode was directed by Fred Savage. The show was canceled after one season when NBC decided to abandon its TNBC lineup and instead lease its Saturday mornings to Discovery Networks starting in fall 2002 for their Discovery Kids on NBC lineup.

== Premise ==
The series focuses on the development of four teenage girls who live and attend high school in Chicago. In the show, the girls' divergent talents, perspectives, and family experiences become the platform for illustrating alternative approaches to understanding and solving problems. It was the first TNBC series shot on videotape that did not have the use of laugh track.

== Cast ==
- Alecia Elliott as Alecia Alcott
- Marieh Delfino as Niki Merrick
- Crystal Grant as Sierra Jennings
- Alicia Lagano as Cristina Castelli

== Episodes ==
No.	Title	Directed by	Written by	Original release date
1	"Truth or Dare"	Fred Savage	Terry Maloney Haley & Mindy Morgenstern	August 4, 2001
2	"The Grass Is Always Pinker"	John Bowab	Terry Maloney Haley & Mindy Morgenstern	August 11, 2001
3	"Flawed Logic"	John Bowab	Chad Hodge	August 18, 2001
4	"Sweet Little Lies"	John Bowab	David Nichols	August 25, 2001
5	"No Questions Asked"	John Bowab	David Nichols	September 1, 2001
6	"Sierra Meets Her Match"	Fred Savage	Amy Engelberg & Wendy Engelberg	September 22, 2001
7	"No Means No"	John Bowab	Elizabeth Craft & Sarah Fain	September 29, 2001
8	"First Snow"	John Bowab	Pamela Pettler	October 6, 2001
9	"Basic Black"	John Bowab	Al Sonja L. Rice	October 13, 2001
10	"The Scare"	John Bowab	Terry Maloney Haley & Mindy Morgenstern	October 20, 2001
11	"Behind the Music"	John Bowab	David Nichols	October 27, 2001
12	"The Making of..."	John Bowab	Chad Hodge	November 3, 2001
13	"New Girl in Town"	John Bowab	Story by : Lois Bromfield & Pamela Pettler; Teleplay by : Pamela Pettler	November 10, 2001
