= Teenage Caveman (2002 film) =

- Directed by: Larry Clark
- Starring: Andrew Keegan; Tara Subkoff; Richard Hillman; Tiffany Limos; Stephen Jasso; Crystal Celeste Grant; Shan Elliot; Hayley Keenan; Paul Hipp
- Music by: Zoë Poledouris

Production
- Cinematography: Steve Gainer
- Editor: Daniel T. Cahn
- Production company: Creature Features

Original release
- Release: July 2, 2002

Teenage Caveman is a 2002 science fiction-horror-teen film directed by provocative filmmaker Larry Clark. It was made as part of a series of low-budget made-for-television movies loosely inspired by B movies that Samuel Z. Arkoff had produced for AIP. The film reused the title and basic premise from the original 1958 film Teenage Caveman, but it is not a remake of the earlier film.

== Plot ==
The film is set in a post-apocalyptic future, where the vast majority of humanity has died due to a viral epidemic. The remaining humans have reverted to primitive tribalism.

After killing his father for sexually assaulting his girlfriend, the son of a tribal leader is banished from the tribe, along with his friends. They eventually stumble upon a solar-powered city whose only two inhabitants are genetically modified to survive the plague. They view themselves as superhuman mutants who intend to recreate humanity in their own image.

== Cast ==
- Andrew Keegan as David
- Tara Subkoff as Sarah
- Richard Hillman as Neil
- Tiffany Limos as Judith
- Stephen Jasso as Vincent
- Crystal Celeste Grant as Elizabeth
- Shan Elliot as Joshua
- Hayley Keenan as Heather
- Paul Hipp as Shaman

== Reception ==
The film received mixed reviews from critics. On the review aggregator website Rotten Tomatoes, the film holds an approval rating of 43% based on 7 reviews, with an average score of 4.50/10.

Scott Thill of PopMatters suggested to "grab some popcorn" and "kick back and laugh".

Kim Newman of Empire gave the film a score of 3 out of 5 stars.

When the DVD version of Teenage Caveman was released on June 10, 2016, Bill Chambers of Film Freak Central wrote: "Unfortunately, while [the film] is a testament to Clark's auteurist position, it establishes him as a filmmaker of limited range".
