= Crystal Celeste Grant =

American actress and singer

- Born: September 20, 1980 (age 46); Houston, Texas, U.S.
- Other name: Crystal Grant
- Occupation: Actress
- Years active: 1991–2005

Crystal Celeste Grant (born September 20, 1980, in Houston, Texas) is a former American actress and singer. She is best known for roles in the films Teenage Caveman (2002) and Kids in America (2005).

In television, she guest starred on Sister, Sister, Smart Guy, Get Real, City Guys, Pacific Blue (appeared in two episodes) and Yes, Dear. In 1996, she co-starred in the feature film Lawnmower Man 2: Beyond Cyberspace. In 2001, she was a series regular on the NBC Saturday morning sitcom All About Us, the series lasted one season.

In 2005, Grant was a featured vocalist on the Cloak-n-Dagga (a rap group composed of rappers Canibus and Phoenix Orion) album Def Con Zero, on the song "Gold Trigga".

She is the younger sister of fellow actor, Salim Grant. Grant's last professional acting credit was in the film Kids in America.
