= Alicia Lagano =

American actress (born 1979)

- Born: Brooklyn, New York, U.S.
- Occupation: Actress
- Years active: 1999–present

Alicia Lagano is an American actress. She is perhaps best known for her role as Cristina Castelli on the NBC Saturday morning series All About Us (2001) and Selena on the Lifetime television drama The Client List (2012–13).

== Early life and education ==
Lagano was born Brooklyn, New York. She is of Italian and Irish descent. At age ten, Lagano moved to Portland, Oregon. She later attended Beaverton High School before graduating from Wilson High School in 1997. She then moved to Los Angeles, California to pursue an acting career.

== Career ==
In addition to her appearance in All About Us, some of her other television acting credits include ER, Bones, Judging Amy, Without a Trace, Lie to Me, CSI: Crime Scene Investigation, Dexter (two episodes as Nikki Wald; 2009) and Prison Break (two episodes as Agatha Warren; 2009). In 2011, she was cast as Selena in Lifetime television drama The Client List, starring Jennifer Love Hewitt.

== Filmography ==
Film
Year	Title	Role	Notes
1999	Totem	Tina Grey	
2000	The Truth About Jane	Taylor	TV film
2001	Micro Mini Kids	Female Party Goer #1	
2003	Dunsmore	Ruby Pritcher	
2004	Raspberry Heaven	Angie Callaway	
2006	Believe in Me	Frances Bonner	
2008	Rock Monster	Toni	TV film
2009	Prison Break: The Final Break	Agatha Warren	TV film
2009	Albino Farm	Melody	
2012	ParaNorman	Female Tourist	Voice
2013	The Wrong Woman	Paula Bates	TV film

Television
Year	Title	Role	Notes
1999	Hang Time	Syd	"Tolerance" (season 5: episode 9)
2001	All About Us	Cristina Castelli	13 episodes
2001	ER	Tracy	"Start All Over Again" (season 8: episode 5)
2002	One on One	Alicia	"The Case of the Almost Broken Heart" (season 1: episode 14)
2003	Judging Amy	Callie Roane	"Marry, Marry Quite Contrary" (season 4: episode 23)
2003	Without a Trace	Michelle Holmes	"Moving On" (season 2: episode 9)
2004	Strong Medicine	Actress	"Bleeding Heart" (season 5: episode 8)
2006	Ghost Whisperer	Lilia	"Miss Fortune" (season 1: episode 18)
2009	Lie to Me	Sheila Lake	"Moral Waiver" (season 1: episode 2)
2009	Prison Break	Agatha Warren	"The Old Ball and Chain" (season 4: episode 23) "Free" (season 4: episode 24)
2009	Dexter	Nikki Wald	"Blinded by the Light" (season 4: episode 3) "Dirty Harry" (season 4: episode 5) "If I Had a Hammer" (season 4: episode 6)
2010	CSI: Crime Scene Investigation	Anya Sanchez	"Pool Shark" (season 11: episode 2)
2010	The Good Guys	Marion	"The Getaway" (season 1: episode 17)
2010	Bones	Kathy Lyford	"The Twisted Bones in the Melted Truck" (season 6: episode 8)
2011	The Cape	Janet Peck	"The Lich: Part 1" (season 1: episode 7)
2011	CSI: Miami	Tricia Quimby	"Blood Lust" (season 9: episode 15)
2012–2013	The Client List	Selena	Series regular
2013	Castle	Emma Riggs	"Number One Fan" (season 6: episode 4)
2013	Grimm	Alicia	"Red Menace" (season 3: episode 9)
2014	Agents of S.H.I.E.L.D.	Rosie	"Yes Men" (season 1: episode 15)
2014	Revenge	Nancy	"Renaissance" (season 4: episode 1)
2014	Scorpion	Renee Connelly	"Shorthanded" (season 1: episode 4)
2015	The Night Shift	Simone	"Aftermath" (season 2: episode 10)
2015	Murder in the First	Sela	"Down Time" (season 2: episode 11)
2016	NCIS	JoAnn Allman	"Reasonable Doubts" (season 13: episode 19)
2023	Chicago Fire	Adler	"Never, Ever Make a Mistake" (season 11: episode 20)
