= Def Con Zero =

Studio album by Cloak-n-Dagga
- Released: October 25, 2005
- Genres: East Coast hip hop, hardcore hip hop
- Labels: Head Trauma, First Kut
- Producers: NIR, Bitch Hater, Markeyz, DJ Example, Simon Sez, Iceberg Slick, ROC, DJ Makie, Jizzm, Fat Jack, Black Rhino

Professional ratings
Review scores
Source	Rating
PopMatters	(5/10)
RapReviews	(7/10)

Def Con Zero is an album by Cloak-n-Dagga, a group composed of rappers Canibus and Phoenix Orion, released on October 25, 2005 through Head Trauma Records and First Kut Records. The album features K-Solo, Kool G Rap, and Free among others. A DVD with over an hour's worth of material concerning the rappers and the creation of the album is included.

== Track listing ==
1. "Intro (Black Kobra)" – 1:37
2. "Def Con Zero" – 3:35
3. "Majestic Mic Masters" – 4:43
4. "Close to Me" (featuring Tyrant and Free)– 4:27
5. "Letter from Head Trauma" (featuring K-Solo and Kool G Rap) – 5:34
6. "Gold Trigga" (featuring Crystal Celeste Grant)– 3:45
7. "Gruntin (interlude)" – 2:25
8. "Don't Hurt Nobody" – 3:35
9. "Titans" – 5:04
10. "Never Run" (featuring Zoo Keepa)– 5:08
11. "Cloakman" – 4:51
12. "Y'all Can't Ball" – 4:25
13. "Commandos" – 4:04
14. "H.T.R." – 4:21
15. "Livin'" (featuring Chalie Mackmansupreme)– 5:06
16. "Rhythmatic Jiu Jitsu" – 3:43
17. "Universal Soldiers" (featuring Power Move and Halo Infinity) – 4:12
18. "Sit Yo Hot Ass Down" (featuring K-Solo and Michelle Regnier Mezzo Soprano) – 4:49
19. "Venomous Spit (B.K. Anthem)" – 2:08

=== Bonus DVD ===
The bonus DVD contains a variety of material, including a short mix of videos featuring the songs on the album, interviews, a behind-the-scenes look at the making of the album and a photo gallery.

The DVD was produced by Tyler Holt of 4down Productions.

1. H.T.R. Video Mix
2. In the Studio / Behind the Scenes
3. Exclusive Interviews
4. Venomous Clips
5. Bonus Tracks: "Sundown" / "High Rollin'"
6. Photo Gallery
