= USS Asheville (PG-21) =

Gunboat of the United States Navy

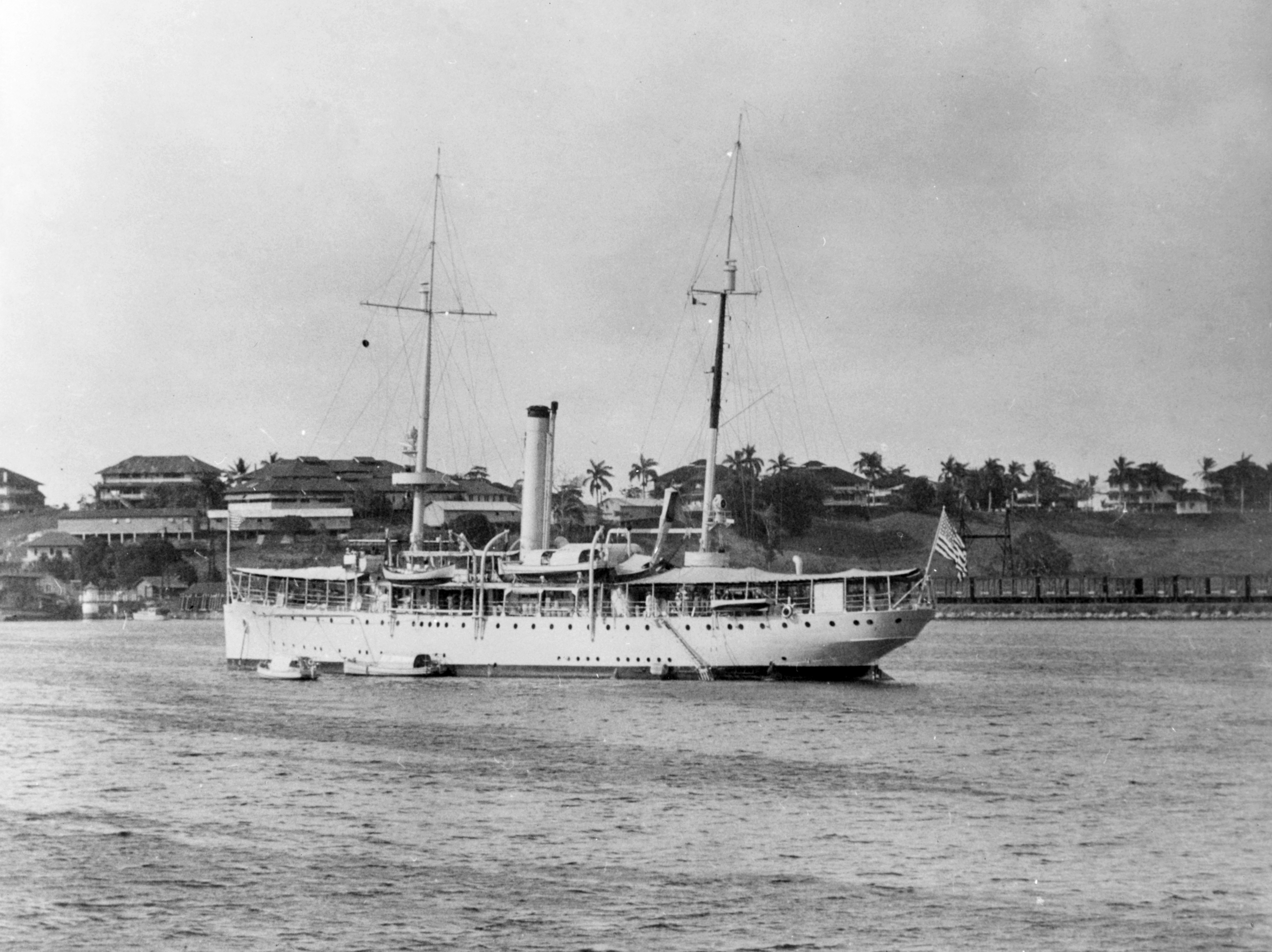
- USS Asheville (PG-21), anchored in the Canal Zone in the late 1920s.

History

United States
- Name: Asheville
- Namesake: City of Asheville, North Carolina
- Ordered: 29 August 1916
- Awarded: 29 August 1916
- Builder: Charleston Naval Shipyard, North Charleston, South Carolina
- Cost: $851,145.37 (hull and machinery)
- Laid down: 9 June 1917
- Launched: 4 July 1918
- Sponsored by: Miss Alyne J. Reynolds
- Commissioned: 6 July 1920
- Reclassified: PG-21, 17 July 1920
- Stricken: 8 May 1942
- Identification: Hull symbol: PG-21; Code letters: NELV
- Honors and awards: 1 × battle star
- Fate: Sunk by enemy action, 3 March 1942

General characteristics
- Class & type: Asheville-class gunboat
- Displacement: 1,575 long tons (1,600 t) (standard); 1,760 long tons (1,790 t) (full load)
- Length: 241 ft 2 in (73.51 m)
- Beam: 41 ft 2 in (12.55 m)
- Draft: 11 ft 4 in (3.45 m)
- Installed power: 3 × Thornycroft Bureau Modified steam boilers; 800 shp (600 kW)
- Propulsion: 1 × Parsons steam turbine; 1 × propeller
- Speed: 12 kn (22 km/h; 14 mph)
- Complement: 159 (1921); 166 (1942)
- Armament: 3 × 4 in (102 mm)/50 caliber guns; 2 × 3-pounder 47 mm (1.9 in) guns; 2 × 1-pounder 37 mm (1.5 in) guns; 4 × .30 cal. Lewis MG; 2 × 3 in (76 mm) landing guns

USS Asheville (Gunboat No. 21/PG-21), the lead ship in her class of two United States Navy gunboats, was the first ship of the United States Navy named for the city of Asheville, North Carolina. The ship was built at the Charleston Naval Shipyard of North Charleston, South Carolina, from her keel laying in June 1918, her launching in July 1918, and her commissioning in July 1920.

Asheville began her career in the early 1920s on power-projection missions ("showing the flag") in Central America. After her 1922 conversion to oil power from coal, Asheville sailed through the Mediterranean and the Indian Ocean to join the Asiatic Fleet in the Philippines. She spent the rest of the 1920s protecting American interests and showing the flag in China. Between 1929 and 1931, Asheville protected American lives and property in Nicaragua. She returned to the Asiatic Fleet and protected American interests as the Second Sino-Japanese War began.

With increasing tensions with Japan, Asheville was withdrawn to the Philippines in the summer of 1941, where she performed local patrol duty. After the American entry into World War II and the Japanese attacks on the Philippines, Asheville, and most of the surface ships in the Philippines, moved to Java to defend the Malay Barrier against the Japanese advance. When the Allied defense crumbled in early March, the remaining American ships were ordered to retreat to Australia. Sailing alone, Asheville was spotted, attacked, and sunk south of Java by a Japanese surface force of a heavy cruiser and two destroyers on 3 March 1942.

== Construction and commissioning ==
The keel for Asheville was laid down on 9 June 1918, at the Charleston Naval Shipyard, North Charleston, South Carolina. She was launched on 4 July 1918; sponsored by Miss Alyne J. Reynolds, daughter of Dr. Carl V. Reynolds, MD, a prominent citizen of Asheville; and commissioned on 6 July 1920, with Lieutenant Commander (LCDR) Elliott Buckmaster, who would later command the carrier Yorktown during World War II, in temporary command. One week later, on 13 July, Commander Jesse B. Gay relieved Buckmaster. On 17 July, the ship was given the designation PG-21.

=== Design ===
Asheville was 241 ft 2 in (73.51 m) long overall, with a beam of 41 ft 3 in (12.57 m) wide and a draft of 11 ft 4 in (3.45 m). She displaced 1,575 long tons (1,600 t) as designed and up to 1,760 long tons (1,790 t) at full combat load. Powered by a one-shaft Parsons steam turbine rated at 800 shp (600 kW) and three Thornycroft Bureau Modified Steam boilers, generating a top speed of 12 kn (22 km/h; 14 mph). Asheville was armed with three 4 in (102 mm)/50 caliber guns, two 3-pounder 47 mm (1.9 in) guns, two 1-pounder (37 mm (1.46 in) guns and four .30 Lewis MGs.

=== Modifications ===
Asheville was originally built to hold a crew of 159, but in 1942, she was modified to hold a crew of 166.

== Service history ==
=== Gulf of Mexico ===
Assigned to Cruiser Division 1, Cruiser Squadron 1, US Atlantic Fleet, for temporary duty at the beginning of her career, Asheville departed her builder's yard for Galveston, Texas, on 7 October 1920. Developing an engine casualty en route, however, the new gunboat put into Key West for repairs before proceeding on to her destination. She was based at Galveston for the next six months, operating in the Gulf of Mexico and making port visits at Tampa and Key West, several times during the course of that period. She also visited Havana, Cuba, from 4 to 7 January 1921.

At one point during her stay at Galveston, an oil tanker nearby caught fire and exploded. Asheville rendered prompt assistance in evacuating injured men, providing medical aid, and in preventing the blaze from spreading to nearby ships and docks.

Following overhaul, Asheville departed Galveston on 12 May 1921, for Charleston, where she arrived on 19 May, and stayed for over a month. She was then dry docked during her stay at Norfolk Naval Yard from 25 June to 2 July, and conducted various trials off Provincetown, Massachusetts, before she visited that port on Independence Day, 1921. She then visited New York City, 10 to 25 July, before she proceeded back down the eastern seaboard to pay return calls at Norfolk and Charleston, undergoing repairs and alterations at the latter.

=== Nicaragua – 1921 ===
Asheville, now assigned to the Special Service Squadron, then departed Charleston on 17 August 1921, for Havana, arriving there on 20 August. Although slated to relieve Sacramento on the east coast of Mexico, Asheville was ordered to proceed "without delay" to Nicaragua, as the Commander, Special Service Squadron had received word on 26 August, of a revolution in that country. The gunboat sailed thence for Bluefields, Nicaragua, where she arrived on 29 August 1921. Asheville "showed the flag" briefly at Bluefields; and, since the government had suppressed the revolution, the gunboat sailed for Port Limón, Costa Rica, where she visited briefly before steaming to her new base at Cristobal, Canal Zone, which she reached on 8 September.

She departed the following day, and paid a return visit to Bluefields, 11 to 13 September 1921, and to Port Limón, 14 to 22 September, before she returned to Cristobal on 23 September and commenced her first transit of the Panama Canal, reaching Balboa later the same day.

=== Panama Canal Zone and refit ===
Asheville spent the next few months operating off the Pacific coast of Central America, her ports of call including Puntarenas, Costa Rica; Puná and Guayaquil, Ecuador; Talara, Peru; Corinto, Nicaragua; and La Unión, El Salvador. In early January 1922, Asheville carried the governor, Jay Johnson Morrow, and physicians to the port of La Palma, Panama, to alleviate the suffering in the wake of floods that had devastated the region of Darién. Arriving on the morning of 7 January 1922, Asheville carried out relief work at La Palma until departing the following day to return to Balboa.

Transiting the Panama Canal again on 10 January 1922, Asheville paused briefly at Guantánamo Bay, 17 to 18 January, before she pressed on the Charleston, reaching that port on 25 January 1922. On 11 February 1922, the gunboat was detached from the Special Service Squadron. During April and May 1922, Asheville underwent conversion from a coal-burning vessel to an oil-burning one, the first of her type to be so altered, and within a month of her leaving the navy yard had won the engineering trophy for ships of her class.

=== Asiatic Fleet – 1922 ===
On 5 June 1922, Asheville, now commanded by Commander, later Admiral, James O. Richardson departed Charleston, and sailed to join the Asiatic Fleet via the Mediterranean. After calling at Bermuda and the Azores en route, Asheville reached Gibraltar on 2 July, and celebrated Independence Day there, clearing that port on 5 July for Valletta, Malta, which she reached on 10 July 1922. Steaming thence to Alexandria, Egypt, where she visited from 17 to 23 July, Asheville then transited the Suez Canal on the 24th and then visited a succession of ports, Aden, Arabia, from 31 July to 3 August 1922; Bombay, India, 10 to 15 August; Colombo, Ceylon, 19 to 24 August; and Singapore, Straits Settlements, 1 to 5 September, before she ultimately reached Cavite, near Manila, on 11 September 1922.

==== Chinese unrest ====
Asheville was based at Cavite into mid-October 1922; during this period, she conducted short range battle practice off Corregidor. However, unrest in China due to a revolution in Fujian, soon prompted her dispatch to Chinese waters with a detachment of Marines embarked. Departing the Philippines on 16 October, she sailed for Fuzhou, a major port city on the coast of China, and arrived soon thereafter, anchoring at the mouth of the Min River. She landed her Marines on the day of her arrival, the Leathernecks transported up the river in motor sailers to Fuzhou. For the next six weeks, Asheville remained at Pagoda Anchorage, at the mouth of the Min, while the Marines were quartered at the American consulate.

Asheville remained at Fuzhou until 5 December 1922, when she sailed for Qingdao, to be present during the transfer of the former German-leased territory of Jiaozhou Bay from Japanese authority to Chinese under the 1922 Japanese-Chinese Shantung Agreement. She "showed the flag" at that North China port, ready to protect American lives and property if the need arose, for the balance of the month of December before she sailed for Shanghai on the last day of 1922, and arrived at her destination to take on stores, fuel, and for recreation for her crew, on 2 January 1923.

With concern over the movement south from Shanghai to Canton, a traditional hotbed of unrest in China, of the Chinese revolutionary, Dr. Sun Yat-Sen, Asheville was sent south to Shantou. Sailing on 27 January 1923 for South China, Asheville reached Shantou on the 30th. Asheville remained at that port until 24 February before she shifted to Hong Kong for fuel, supplies, a dry docking and minor repairs; she stayed there for a month before she returned to Shantou on 27 March. While she had been at Hong Kong, Sun Yat-Sen had assumed the title of Generalissimo on 2 March and established his party firmly at Canton.

On 10 April 1923, Asheville departed Shantou for Cavite, and arrived there three days later. The ship conducted day spotting, long-range battle, and night battle practice in Philippine waters until 1 May, when she sailed for Hong Kong to transfer new enlisted men. Asheville reached Hong Kong on 4 May, and soon resumed her operation on the coast of South China. Over the next few months, she used Hong Kong as her recreation port and stood by, watchfully waiting, at the ports of Shantou, Canton, Fuzhou, Amoy, and Yangjiang. Asheville witnessed three changes of government during her visits to Shantou and, as the occasion demanded, sent Marines ashore to protect American lives and property. At Yangjiang, her bluejacket landing party carried bacon, rice, and flour to beleaguered foreigners. She lay at Canton during the repeated attempts by the Chinese warlord General Ch'en Chiung-Ming to wrest it from the hands of Sun's troops.

After a visit to Hong Kong from 20 October to 6 November 1923, Asheville returned to Canton as a diplomatic crisis arose because of the avowed threat by Sun Yat-Sen to seize customs revenue at Canton, hitherto under international control. Sun's threat jeopardized the "Treaty Powers," whose loans to China had been financed by the revenues of the Chinese maritime customs. This "acute diplomatic tangle" found American interests represented by Asheville's captain, Commander Richardson, who was concurrently Commander, South China Patrol.

Richardson reported daily to the Commander in Chief, US Asiatic Fleet, Admiral Thomas Washington, and the American Minister in China, on events as they unfolded and, even though the junior force commander on the scene, eventually commanded the largest force, Asheville and six destroyers that had been sent to Canton, involved in the united effort to stand firm in the face of Sun's threats. Ordered by CinCAF to concentrate the necessary force at Canton and to prevent Sun's seizure of the customs "by all measures short of war," Richardson interpreted the order as allowing him to stop Sun's attempt to seize the customs by force, but not to pursue his men if they fled. Eventually, the "firm stand and cooperation shown" by the Treaty Powers "compelled Sun Yat-Sen to recede from his threat ..." As Richardson later reflected in his memoirs, he had been entrusted with "more responsibility, more independence, and power of decision than usually come to an officer of the rank of Commander . . . ."

==== Showing the flag ====
Over the next few years, Asheville continued to operate with the Asiatic Fleet, ready to "show the flag" or put a landing force ashore to protect lives and property. During the unrest in the Yangtze valley in 1926 and 1927, Asheville again provided bluejacket and Marine landing parties as required, between 3 November 1926 and 2 April 1927, between 13 and 18 May 1927, and between 2 and 23 August 1927. In November 1927, a bluejacket landing party from Asheville proceeded up the Makyoung River to Yangjiang to protect American missions there, but, since the civil authorities had the situation well in hand by the time of their arrival, Asheville's men returned to the ship. In the spring of 1928, Asheville replaced Helena as flagship of the South China Patrol, and served in that capacity until relieved by her sister ship Tulsa on 6 April 1929.

=== Return to Panama – 1929 ===
In the summer of 1929, Asheville rejoined the Special Service Squadron, and operated out of Coco Solo, on the Atlantic side of the Panama Canal. Between 5 August 1929 and 17 June 1931, Sailors and Marines from Asheville served ashore in Nicaragua on six separate occasions, as the United States maintained forces in that country to cooperate with the Nicaraguan government in the protection of American lives and property.

==== Nicaragua – 1931 ====
Typical of the conditions that resulted in the deployment of a landing party was bandit activity on the east coast of Nicaragua. On 11, 12, and 13 April 1931, a group of about 150 bandits killed 18 foreigners, of whom several were Americans, and were closing in on the town of Puerto Cabezas. Upon the first warning of this activity, Asheville, which had been at Cristobal, proceeded immediately to Puerto Cabezas, arriving there about midnight on 13 April; the bandits were only about five miles from the town. Commander Ward W. Waddell, Asheville's captain, showed excellent judgement and initiative by anchoring his ship close to the town's wharf and turning on his searchlights and training out his guns. "By common report," the Commander, Special Service Squadron, wrote later, "any further attempts of the bandits against Puerto Cabezas immediately ceased and the fear and alarm of the citizens were greatly allayed . . . "

=== Return to the Asiatic Fleet – 1932 ===
Detached from the Special Service Squadron on 27 January 1932, Asheville returned to the Asiatic Fleet soon thereafter, and, as in 1926 and 1927, provided landing forces to protect American lives and property between 18 and 23 March 1932, and between 27 June and 9 October of the same year. Over the next few years, Asheville continued to operate principally in Chinese waters in the traditional role of "showing the flag" and standing by to protect American lives and property as the occasion demanded. The Second Sino-Japanese War, which commenced on 7 July 1937, presented the Asiatic Fleet with ample opportunity on the coast of China to fulfill the latter role.

==== Second Sino-Japanese War – Showing the flag again ====
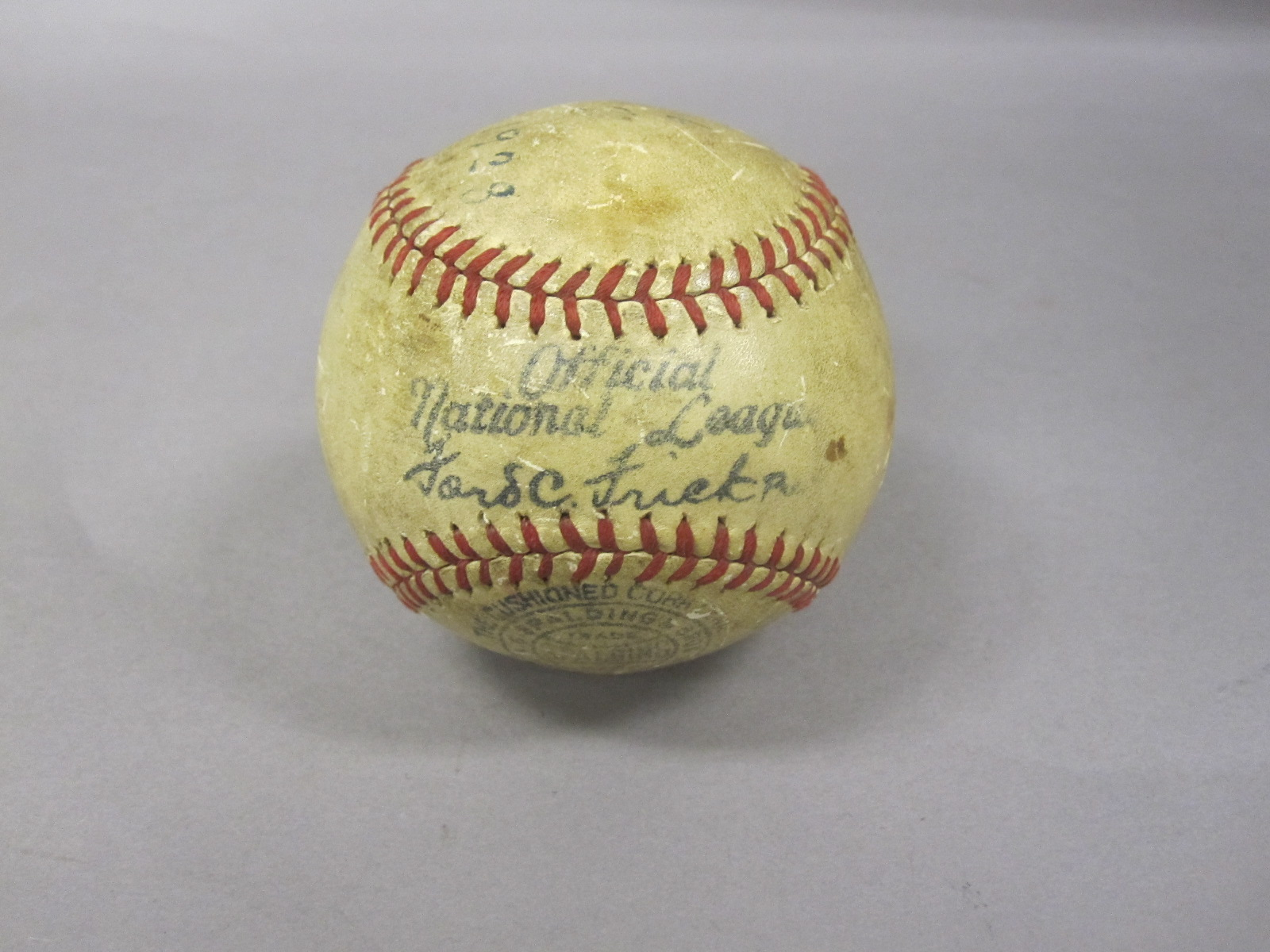
A baseball used in a game between Asheville crew members and a team from the 2nd Fleet (20 August 1938)

For Asheville, an example of such duty came in the spring of 1938. During much of April and the first few days of May, Asheville had lain off the port of Amoy, observing conditions there, until sailing for Shantou on 9 May. When she arrived at the latter port, she received word that Japanese forces were bombing and shelling Amoy, and would soon attempt a landing. The gunboat immediately sailed to return to Shantou, arrived there on the afternoon of 11 May just as sailors of the Japanese Special Naval Landing Force were entering the city, and dropped anchor in the outer harbor, near the British destroyer Diana. The following day, Asheville led Diana into the inner harbor, and moored to a buoy between the American consulate and the Hope Memorial Hospital, giving a "sense of security" to the neutral residents in the Kulangsu International Settlement.

Commander Allen G. Quynn, Asheville's captain, sent Marines from the ship's detachment ashore to guard the American hospital; the Chinese nurses there particularly appreciated the Marines' presence, fearing a repetition of outrages by the Japanese that had occurred when they had taken Nanjing in December 1937. Anchored within 300 yards of the Bund, Asheville kept a careful watch on the activities of the Japanese. One occasion the ship's medical people provided first aid to two badly wounded Chinese women-who had been shot by a Japanese sentry-taken on board from a sampan. Transferred to the American hospital as soon as possible, one of the unfortunate women died several days later. Soon thereafter, Marblehead, with Captain John T. G. Stapler, Commander, South China Patrol, embarked, arrived at Amoy, releasing Asheville to proceed back to Shantou. A little over a year later, Asheville again proceeded to the port of Shantou, and witnessed its occupation by the Japanese.

==== Withdrawal to the Philippines – 1941 ====
With the increasing tensions in the Far East, Admiral Thomas C. Hart, Commander in Chief, US Asiatic Fleet, withdrew Asheville and her sister ship Tulsa to the Philippines. Asheville left Chinese waters for the last time on 5 July 1941, when she sailed from Amoy for Manila. Unfortunately, the ship's single shaft broke while the ship rode out a typhoon off Shantou. Admiral Hart dispatched Marblehead to bring in the crippled gunboat. The cruiser brought Asheville home on 11 July. Since Admiral Hart had regarded Asheville and Tulsa as having neither the speed with which to run nor the guns with which to fight, he assigned them to the Inshore Patrol based at Manila, where they remained on local patrol duty into December 1941.

=== World War II ===
The outbreak of war in the Far East on 8 December 1941, 7 December east of the Date Line, found Asheville at anchor in Manila Bay. Soon after receiving a priority radio dispatch at 0340 on that day telling of hostilities with Japan, Asheville got underway for Mariveles Bay and, over the next two days, conducted patrols off Corregidor. At 1300 on 10 December, while operating on patrol station "Cast", her men noted bomb explosions in the direction of Cavite Navy Yard. Observing 27 Japanese bombers, land attack planes from the Takao and 1st Kōkūtai, headed to seaward from Cavite soon thereafter, Asheville manned her air-defense stations as guns on Corregidor opened fire on the enemy.

Following the Japanese attacks on the Philippines, Admiral Hart sent Asheville, and other surface ships, south from Manila Bay to the "Malay Barrier". By and large, only tenders and submarines remained in Philippine waters. Asheville stood out of Manila Bay a half-hour into the mid watch on 11 December 1941, and, steaming via the Celebes Sea and Balikpapan, Borneo, ultimately reached Surabaya, Java, three days after Christmas of 1941.

==== Retreat to Java ====
She was eventually based at Tjilatjap, on Java's south coast. When Japanese planes bombed and heavily damaged Langley south of Java on 27 February 1942, Asheville was one of the ships sent to her assistance; she returned to port soon thereafter, the seaplane tender's survivors being picked up by other ships.

As the Allied defense crumbled under the relentless Japanese onslaught, however, the Allied naval command was dissolved. On the morning of 1 March 1942, Vice Admiral William A. Glassford, Commander, Southwest Pacific Force, formerly the US Asiatic Fleet, ordered the remaining American naval vessels to retire to Australian waters.

==== Retreat to Australia – sinking ====
Asheville, Lieutenant Jacob W. Britt in command, cleared Tjilatjap a little before 1500 on 1 March 1942, bound for Fremantle. In the late afternoon on 2 March, she was seen by the Australian corvette Bendigo, heading for Australia. At 0615, Tulsa sighted a ship, and identified her as Asheville, probably the last time the latter was in sight of friendly forces. During the forenoon watch on 3 March, Asheville radioed "RRRR ASHEVILLE ATTACKED 12°33′S 111°35′E", some 300 nmi (560 km; 350 mi) south of Java. The minesweeper Whippoorwill heard the initial distress call and turned toward the reported position some 90 nmi (170 km; 100 mi) away. When a second report specified that the ship was being attacked by a surface vessel, however, Whippoorwill's captain, Lieutenant Commander Charles R. Ferriter, reasoning correctly that "any surface vessel that could successfully attack the Asheville would be too much" for his own command, ordered the minesweeper to resume her voyage to Australia.

Asheville, presumed lost, was stricken from the Navy list on 8 May 1942. Not until after World War II, however, did the story of her last battle emerge, when a survivor of the heavy cruiser Houston, told of meeting, in prison camp, Fireman 1st Class Fred L. Brown. Hampered by engine troubles and sailing alone, Asheville was discovered on 3 March 1942 by a shipborne scout plane south of Java and overtaken by a Japanese surface force, led by Vice Admiral Nobutake Kondō, consisting of the destroyers Arashi and Nowaki, and the heavy cruiser Maya. As the cruiser stood by, the two Japanese destroyers closed and engaged Asheville at close range with their guns in position 12°50′S 111°20′E. After an intense 30-minute gun battle, the smoldering hulk of Asheville, her forecastle and bridge almost completely shot away, finally sank. Brown, an 18-year-old from Ft. Wayne, Indiana, had been in the gunboat's fire room when the surface force had overtaken the ship. Many men topside were dead by the time Brown arrived topside to abandon ship. After calling to ask if there was an officer among the swimmers, a sailor on board one of the enemy destroyers threw out a line, which Brown grasped and was hauled on board. Asheville's only known survivor perished in the Japanese Makassar prisoner-of-war camp on 18 March 1945, in the Celebes Islands of the Netherlands East Indies.

== Awards ==
- Second Nicaraguan Campaign Medal
- Yangtze Service Medal
- China Service Medal
- American Defense Service Medal with "FLEET" clasp
- Asiatic-Pacific Campaign Medal with one battle star
- World War II Victory Medal
- Philippine Defense Medal

== Notes ==
Citations
