= Larry Clark =

American filmmaker

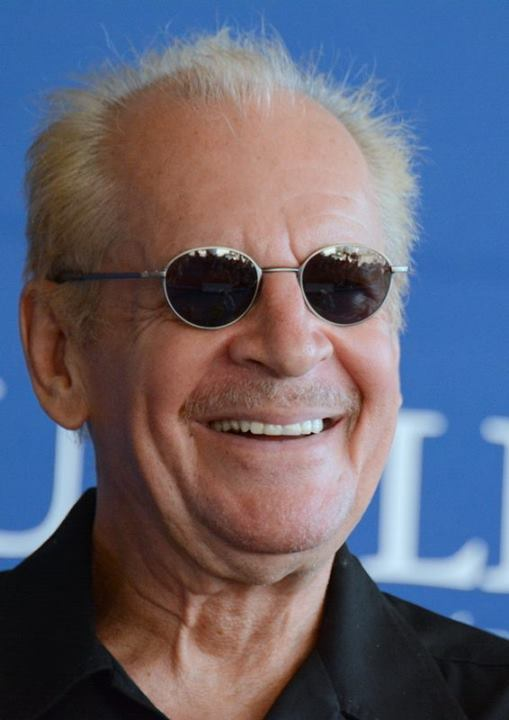
- Larry Clark in 2013 at the Deauville American Film Festival
- Born: Lawrence Donald Clark; January 19, 1943 (age 83); Tulsa, Oklahoma, U.S.
- Years active: 1962–present
- Children: 3

Lawrence Donald Clark (born January 19, 1943) is an American film director, photographer, writer and film producer who is best known for his controversial teen film Kids (1995) and his photography book Tulsa (1971). His work focuses primarily on youth who casually engage in illegal drug use, underage sex, and violence, and who are part of a specific subculture, such as surfing, punk rock, or skateboarding.

== Early life ==
Clark was born in Tulsa, Oklahoma. He learned photography at an early age. His mother was an itinerant baby photographer, and he was enlisted in the family business from the age of 14. His father was a traveling sales manager for the Reader Service Bureau, selling books and magazines door-to-door, and was rarely home. In 1959, Clark began injecting amphetamines with his friends.

Clark attended the Layton School of Art in Milwaukee, Wisconsin, where he studied under Walter Sheffer and Gerhard Bakker.

== Career ==
In 1964, he moved to New York City to freelance, but was drafted within two months into the United States Army. From 1964 to 1965, he served in the Vietnam War in a unit that supplied ammunition to units fighting in the north. His experiences there led him to publish the 1971 book Tulsa, a photo documentary illustrating his young friends' drug use in black and white.

Routinely carrying a camera, from 1963 to 1971 Clark produced pictures of his drug-shooting coterie that have been described by critics as "exposing the reality of American suburban life at the fringe and ... shattering long-held mythical conventions that drugs and violence were an experience solely indicative of the urban landscape."

His follow-up was Teenage Lust (1983), an "autobiography" of his teen past through the images of others. It included his family photos, more teenage drug use, graphic pictures of teenage sexual activity, and young male hustlers in Times Square, New York City. Clark constructed a photographic essay titled "The Perfect Childhood" that examined the effect of media in youth culture. His photographs are part of public collections at several art museums including the Whitney Museum of American Art, Museum of Photographic Arts, and the Museum of Fine Arts, Boston.

In 1993, Clark directed Chris Isaak's music video "Solitary Man". This experience developed into an interest in film direction. After publishing other photographic collections, Clark met Harmony Korine in New York City and asked Korine to write the screenplay for his first feature film Kids, which was released to controversy and mixed critical reception in 1995. Clark continued directing, filming a handful of additional independent feature films in the several years after this.

In 2001, Clark shot three features — Bully, Ken Park and Teenage Caveman — over a span of nine months. As of 2017, they are his last films to feature professional actors.

In 2002, Clark spent several hours in a police cell after punching and trying to strangle Hamish McAlpine, the head of Metro Tartan, the UK distributor for Ken Park. According to McAlpine, who was left with a broken nose, the incident arose from an argument about Israel and the Middle East, and he claims that he did not provoke Clark.

In a 2016 interview, Clark discussed his lifelong struggle with drug abuse, although stating he maintained total sobriety while filmmaking. He confessed that the only exception made to his practice of abstinence while filming was Marfa Girl. Clark explained that while filming that movie he used opiates for pain due to double knee replacement surgery.

== Films ==
=== Kids ===
In Kids (1995), his most widely known film, boys portrayed as being as young as 12 are shown to be casually drinking alcohol and using other drugs. The film received an NC-17 rating, and was later released without a rating when Disney bought Miramax.

=== Other work ===
Ken Park is a more sexually and violently graphic film than Kids, including a scene of auto-erotic asphyxiation and ejaculation by an emotionally rattled high-school boy (portrayed by James Ransone, then in his early 20s).

In Australia, Ken Park was banned for its graphic sexual content and a protest screening held in response was immediately shut down by the police. Australian film critic Margaret Pomeranz, co-host of At the Movies, was almost arrested for screening the film at a hall. The film was not released in the United States, but Clark says that it was because of the producer's failure to get releases for the music used.

In 2015, Clark collaborated alongside notable skateboard and clothing brand, Supreme, to celebrate the 20th anniversary of Kids with a collection of decks, T-shirts, and sweatshirts that feature stills from the iconic film. The collection was released on May 21, 2015, in Supreme's New York, Los Angeles, and London locations and on May 23 in its Japan location.

Clark has won the top prizes at the Cognac Festival du Film Policier (for Another Day in Paradise), the Stockholm Film Festival (for Bully) and the Rome Film Festival (for Marfa Girl). He has also competed for the Golden Palm (Kids) and Golden Lion (Bully).

== Filmography ==
| Year | Title | Director | Writer | Producer | Cinematographer | Note |
|---|---|---|---|---|---|---|
| 1995 | Kids | Yes | No | No | No | |
| 1998 | Another Day in Paradise | Yes | No | Yes | No | |
| 2001 | Bully | Yes | No | No | No | |
| 2002 | Teenage Caveman | Yes | No | No | No | Television film |
| 2002 | Ken Park | Yes | No | No | Yes | Co-directed with Edward Lachman |
| 2005 | Wassup Rockers | Yes | Yes | Yes | No | |
| 2006 | Destricted | Yes | No | No | No | Segment: "Impaled" |
| 2012 | Marfa Girl | Yes | Yes | No | No | |
| 2014 | The Smell of Us | Yes | Yes | No | Yes | French |
| 2018 | Marfa Girl 2 | Yes | Yes | No | No | |
