= USS Tulsa =

Two ships of the United States Navy has been named USS Tulsa, after Tulsa, Oklahoma. A third ship of this name was planned but never built.

- USS Tulsa (PG-22), a gunboat that served during World War II receiving two battle stars. Commissioned 3 December 1923 and renamed USS Tacloban 18 December 1944. The ship was decommissioned 6 March 1946.
- USS Tulsa (CA-129), assigned 27 November 1944 to be an Oregon City-class cruiser built at Quincy, Massachusetts, by the Bethlehem Steel Company's Fore River Plant. However, on 12 August 1945, before the ship's keel had been laid, the contract for her construction was cancelled due to cessation of hostilities in the Pacific Theater.
- USS Tulsa (LCS-16) is an Independence-class littoral combat ship and was built by Austal USA in Mobile, Alabama. Commissioned on 16 February 2019, the ship is now assigned to Littoral Combat Ship Squadron One.
