= USS Isabel =

Patrol vessel of the United States Navy

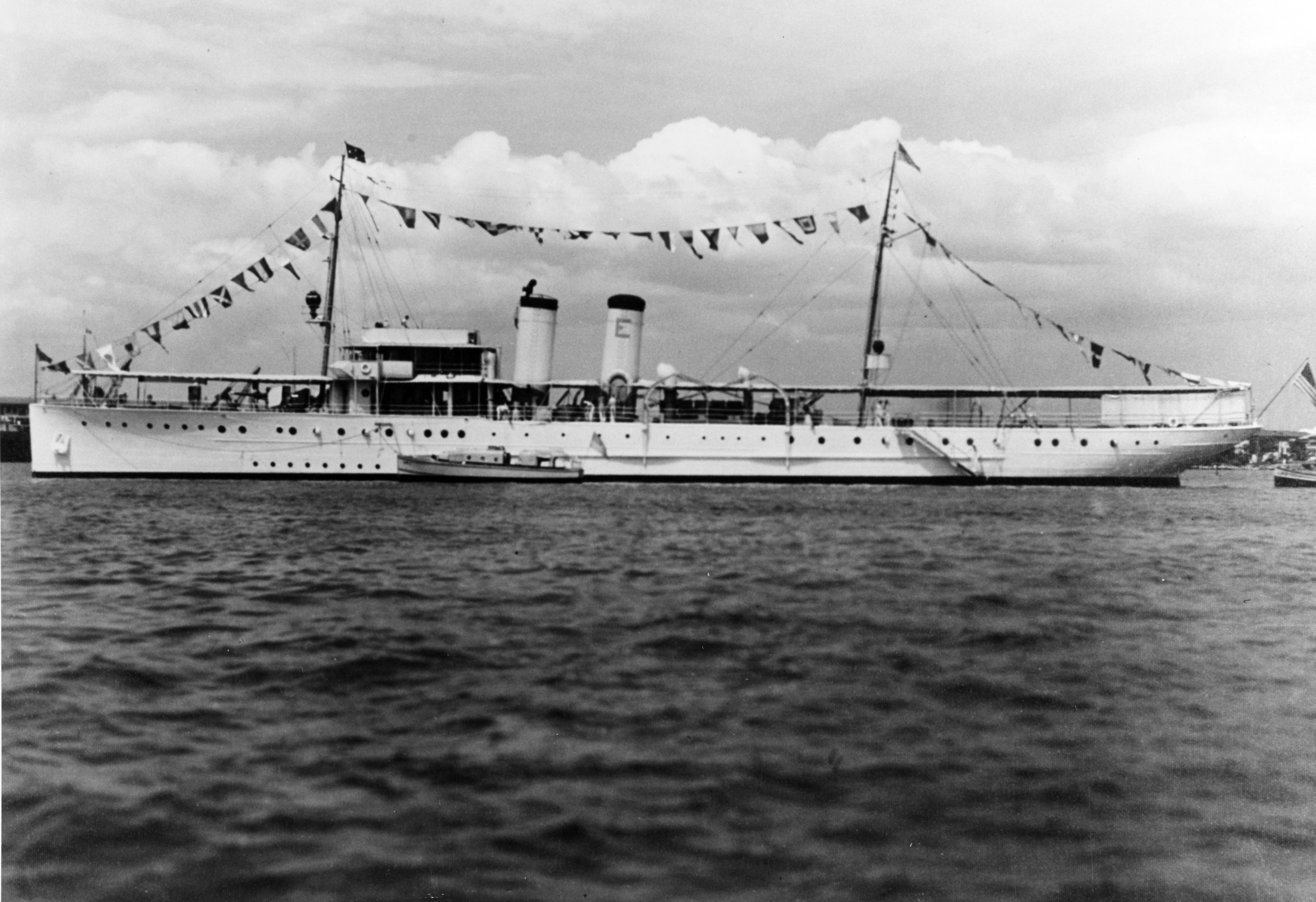
- USS Isabel (PY-10) at Hankou, China, in 1937, dressed overall for the coronation of King George VI of the United Kingdom

History

United States
- Name: Isabel
- Namesake: previous name retained
- Builder: Bath Iron Works, Bath, Maine
- Cost: $611,553 (USD) (purchase price)
- Completed: 1917
- Commissioned: 28 December 1917
- Decommissioned: 30 April 1920
- Recommissioned: 18 July 1921
- Decommissioned: 11 February 1946
- Reclassified: From destroyer (with patrol vessel designation "SP-521") to patrol yacht PY-10 17 July 1920
- Stricken: 26 February 1946
- Honours and awards: 1 Battle Stars
- Fate: Sold for scrapping, 2 March 1946

General characteristics
- Type: Destroyer 1917–1920; Patrol yacht 1920–1946
- Displacement: 710 tons
- Length: 245 ft 3 in (74.75 m) oa; 230 ft (70.10 m) pp
- Beam: 27 ft 9 in (8.46 m)
- Draft: 8 ft 6 in (2.59 m) or 9 ft 2 in (2.79 m)
- Propulsion: 2 × Norman boilers; Parsons Steam turbines; 2 shafts; 8,400 shp (6,300 kW)
- Speed: 26 knots or 28.8 knots
- Complement: 103
- Armament: 1917: 4 × 3-inch (76.2-millimeter) 50-caliber guns; 4 × 21-inch (533-millimeter) torpedo tubes; 1 × depth charge projector; 2 × .30-caliber (7.62-millimeter) Lewis machine guns; 1921: 2 × 3-inch (76.2-millimeter) 50-caliber guns; 2 × 3-inch (76.2-millimeter) 23-caliber antiaircraft guns; 1 × depth charge projector; 2 × .30-caliber (7.62-millimeter) Lewis machine guns

USS Isabel (SP-521), later PY-10, was a yacht in commission in the United States Navy as a destroyer from 1917 to 1920 and as a patrol yacht from 1921 to 1946.

== Construction, acquisition, and commissioning ==
Isabel was built as a private yacht in 1917 by Bath Iron Works, Bath, Maine for automobile manufacturer John North Willys of Toledo, Ohio. Willys had intended for the yacht to have qualities that would make her desirable for use by the U.S. Navy, and had contacted the Navy about the possibility of selling her into naval service. The Navy initially was uninterested. However, after the United States entered World War I on 6 April 1917, the Navy decided to buy Isabel, which it viewed as being not only highly suitable for use as a patrol vessel but also having characteristics similar to those of a destroyer. The Navy therefore acquired her in 1917 prior to completion, converted to Navy use as a destroyer, gave her the patrol vessel designation SP-521, (Note: Although classified as a destroyer, her hull number was that of a section patrol vessel.) and commissioned her as USS Isabel at the Boston Navy Yard in Boston, Massachusetts, on 28 December 1917.

== Service in World War I ==
Isabel departed on 28 January 1918 (Note: Cressman, p. 60, places the date at 29 January 1918) for France via Bermuda and the Azores. She reached Brest, France, on 20 February 1918 to begin convoy escort duties. While performing coastal convoy duty, she fought German submarines on four occasions. The first time was on 18 March 1918, when at 10:50 hours, while proceeding westward and escorting stores ship USS Rappahannock (AF-6) and transport USS President Grant (ID-3014), she and destroyer USS Reid (DD-21) spotted a German submarine (Note: Cressman, p. 60, says the submarine was UC-55, but Gröner, Erich, German Warships 1815–1945 Volume Two: U-Boats and Mine Warfare Vessels, Annapolis, Maryland:Naval Institute Press, 1991, ISBN 1-55750-301-X, p. 33, says that UC-55 was sunk in September 1917. U-55 (see Gröner, ppp 26 & 28) and UB-55 (see Gröner, p. 9), however, both were in commission in March 1918, and, given her English Channel operating area, UB-55 is likely the submarine to which Cressman is referring.) off Penmarc'h, France. Reid fired on the submarine and dropped two depth charges, while Isabel dropped one depth charge.

Her commanding officer, Lieutenant Commander Shoemaker, received the Navy Cross "for distinguished service... as commanding officer of... Isabel, engaged in the important, exacting and hazardous duty of transporting and escorting troops and supplies through waters infested with enemy submarines and mines." He was relieved by Lieutenant Lewis W. Comstock on 24 July 1918.

Isabel continued protecting convoys carrying troops and supplies to France until the end of the war and departed France on 16 December 1918.

== Post-World War I service 1919–1920 ==
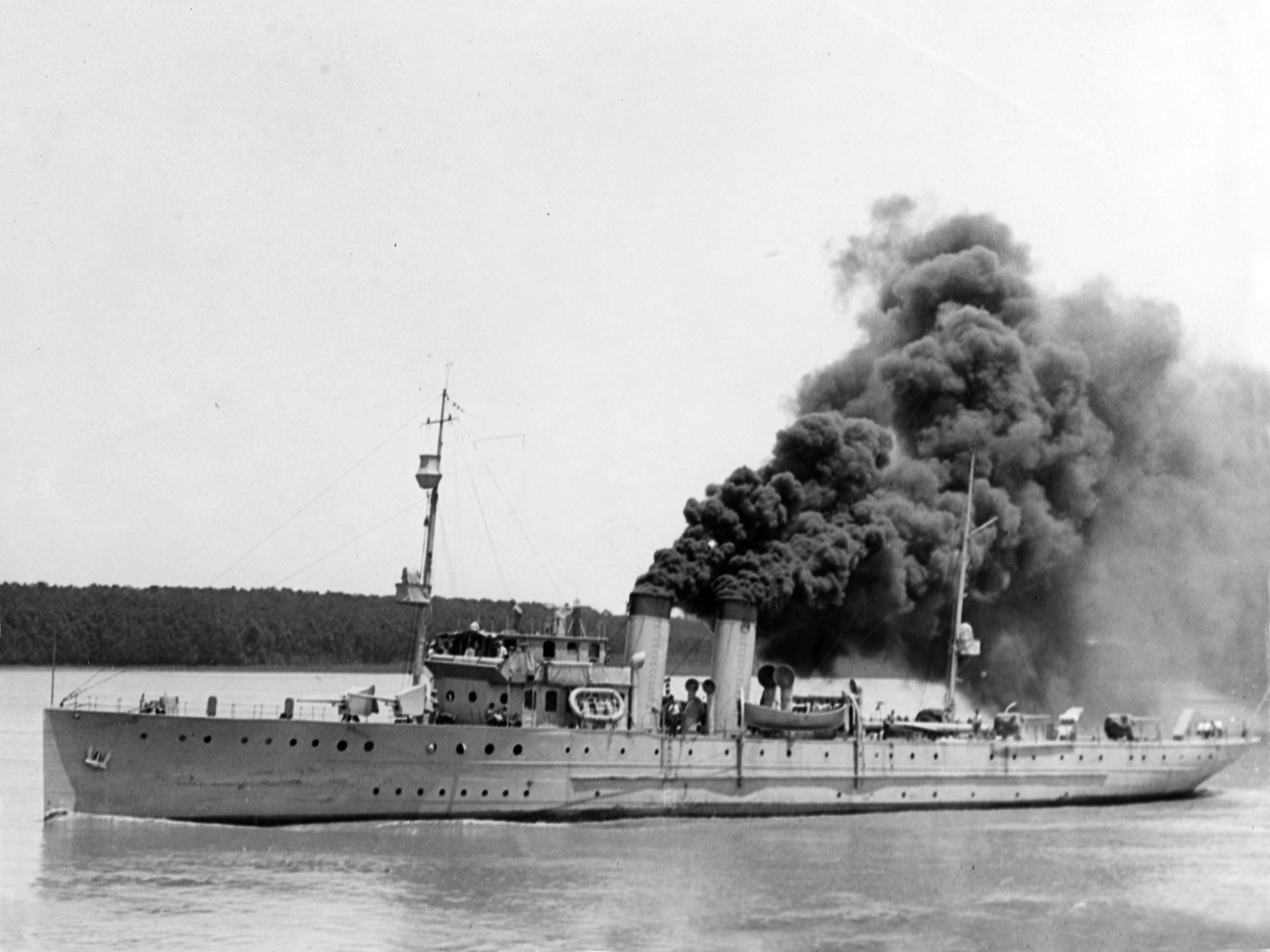
USS Isabel (SP-521) making smoke ca. 1919. (The photograph has also been identified as showing her on the Yangtze River in 1921).

Arriving at Boston, Massachusetts, on 2 January 1919, Isabel remained inactive at Philadelphia, Pennsylvania, until 25 April 1919, when she was ordered to Key West, Florida, to report to the commanding officer of submarine USS K-5 (SS-36) for duty as a tender to ships on the Mississippi River. Departing Key West on 14 May 1919, Isabel steamed up the Mississippi to St. Louis, Missouri, stopping at every major port on the river along the way to perform recruiting duties for the Navy.

Returning to New Orleans, Louisiana, on 20 August 1919, Isabel was soon underway for Rockaway Beach, Long Island, New York, for duty as a tender for the famous flying boats of the NC-4 flotilla. Reporting 18 September 1919, she cruised the United States East Coast with the aircraft from Maine to Florida before returning to Rockaway Beach on 4 January 1920.

Isabel decommissioned at Philadelphia 30 April 1920.

== Out of commission 1920–1921 ==
While Isabel was out of commission, her classification was changed from "destroyer" to "patrol yacht", and, under the Navy's new alphanumeric hull classification system instituted in 1920, her designation changed from SP-521 to PY-10 on 20 July 1920. Meanwhile, the Navy considered how best to employ her in the future. One idea was to convert her into a seaplane tender to support the NC flying boats; another was to send her to Constantinople in the Ottoman Empire to replace the gunboat USS Scorpion (PY-3) as station ship there. In the end, it was decided to send her to the Far East and employ her on the Yangtze Patrol. Two of her 3-inch (76.2-millimeter) single-purpose guns were removed and replaced by two 3-inch (76.2-millimeter) 23-caliber antiaircraft guns.

== The Yangtze Patrol 1921–1928 ==
Recommissioning at Philadelphia on 18 July 1921, Isabel departed for the Far East on 21 August 1921 to join the Yangtze Patrol on the Yangtze River. Transiting the Panama Canal, she arrived at Hong Kong on 7 November 1921. She became flagship of the patrol's commander, Rear Admiral William H. G. Bullard. She was further modified at Cavite Navy Yard in Cavite, Luzon, the Philippines, having a deckhouse installed aft.

During the tumultuous years that followed in China, Isabel served as a member of the patrol and as its flagship, charged with protecting American commerce from pirates. Based at Shanghai, Isabel spent the low-water period on the river at Hankou, returning to the coast in the summer. She and the other small gunboats of the U.S. Navy in China performed the arduous task of protecting American interests during numerous incidents and threats to American nationals. On many occasions the ship came under fire, as in October 1926 when she was caught between the rifle fire of opposing Chinese armies on the Yangtze. Isabel also took part in the Nanking Incident on 24 March 1927, when shelling and threats of force procured the release of a large group of American and British prisoners held by Chinese nationalists in Nanjing. She patrolled the 1,700 nautical miles (3,148 kilometers) of this dangerous river until 1928, when enough purpose-built river gunboats had arrived to serve in the Yangtze Patrol that she was no longer needed on the river. She then joined the Asiatic Fleet.

== Asiatic Fleet duty 1928–1941 ==
Her aft deckhouse removed, Isabel spent 1928 through 1941 with the Asiatic Fleet in the Philippines and China, much of the time at Manila as "relief flagship" for the fleet commander. In the 1933–1934 gunnery year, she finished first among patrol vessels mounting 3-inch (76.2-millimeter) 50-caliber guns.

In December 1941, as the threat of war with Japan grew ever larger, Isabel was given a secret mission by President Franklin D. Roosevelt to make a reconnaissance of the coast of Japanese-occupied French Indochina. Personally briefed on the plan by Asiatic Fleet commander Admiral Thomas C. Hart, Isabel's commanding officer, Lieutenant John W. Payne Jr., took her to sea on 3 December 1941, with all excess topside weight removed and her motorboat replaced by a pulling whaleboat, heavily fueled and provisioned, carrying additional life rafts, and with all of her codebooks except for one prearranged cipher left ashore. She left Manila under a cover story that she was searching for a PBY Catalina flying boat missing off the Indochinese coast. Payne was under orders to approach the coast under the cover of darkness, showing lights that would mislead observers to think that she was a fishing vessel, and report on Japanese ship movements; if forced to fight, he was to fight back as best he could and try to escape, but, if necessary, to destroy Isabel rather than allow the Japanese to capture her.

Isabel first sighted another ship on 5 December 1941, when she encountered a large, dark-gray ship flying no flag and apparently altering course frequently to try to move out of sighting range. On the morning of 6 December 1941, a Japanese Aichi E13A1 "Jake" reconnaissance floatplane from the seaplane tender Kamikawa Maru circled Isabel at an altitude of 1,000 feet (300 meters) and a range of 2,000 yards (1,800 meters). She was in sight of Cam Ranh Bay, French Indochina, later that day when she was ordered to return to Manila. While she was on her return voyage, she received word on 8 December 1941 (which was 7 December 1941 in the United States and at Hawaii), of the Japanese attacked Pearl Harbor and the beginning of U.S. participation in World War II.

== World War II service ==
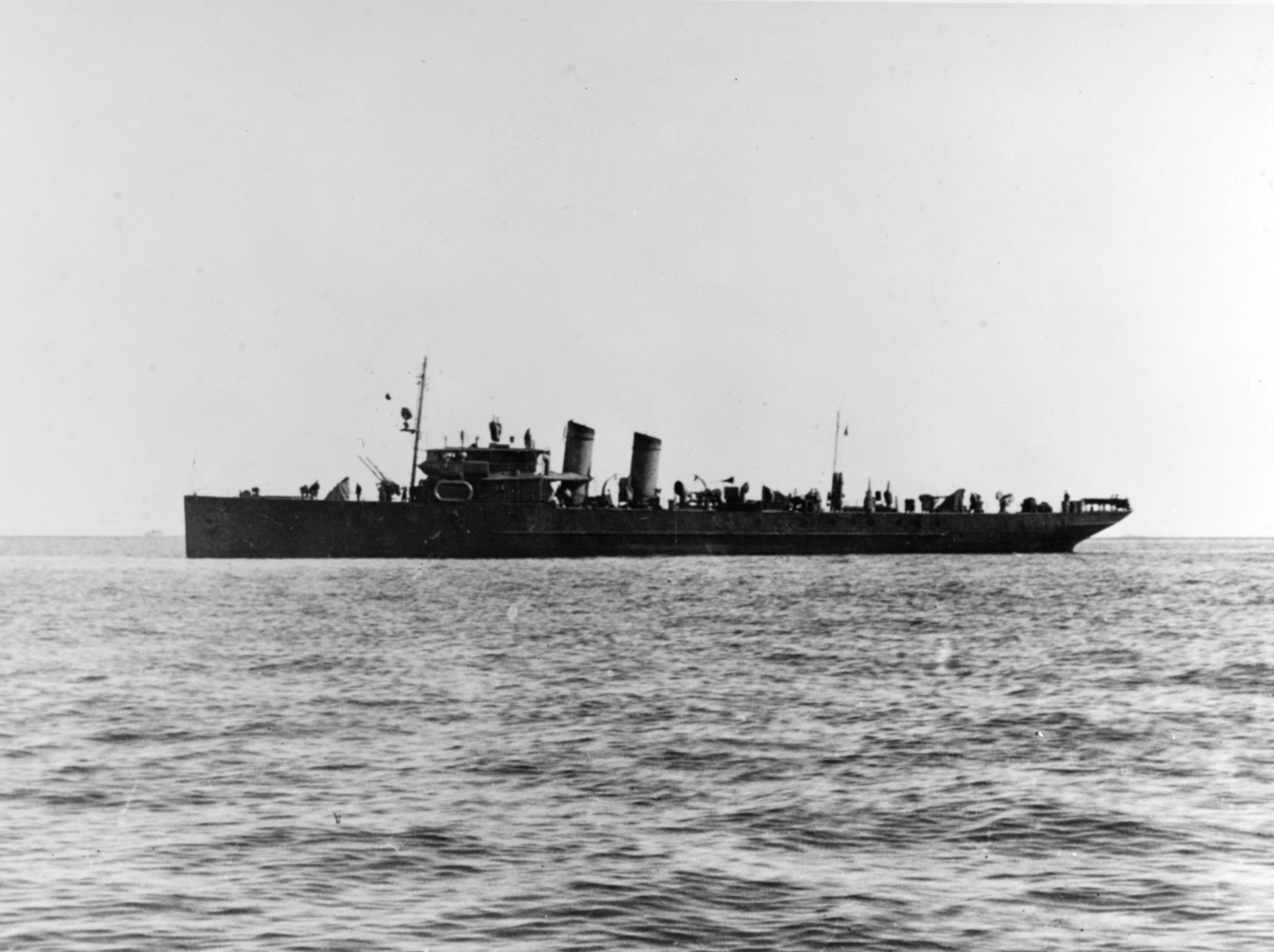
USS Isabel (PY-10) in the Southwest Pacific in 1942.

Isabel's first wartime duty was to escort U.S. Navy submarines through the minefields off Corregidor as they sortied from Manila Bay to defend the Philippines. She was at Cavite Navy Yard when Japanese aircraft made a devastating attack on the base on 10 December 1941. Eight bombs, all duds, ringed Isabel's fantail. She shot down one of the attackers. That evening Isabel and two destroyers escorted the submarine tenders Holland and Otus with the just relieved Commander of Submarines south to Borneo in order to set up an alternate command.

For the next month Isabel operated as an antisubmarine escort for convoys in the East Indies, as outnumbered American, British, Australian, and Dutch forces tried desperately to oppose the Japanese offensive. She underwent air raids at Batavia on Java, Palembang on Sumatra, and Tjilatap on Java, escaping from several ports only days ahead of invading Japanese forces. On 20 January 1942 the ship was part of the covering force at Ratai Bay on the Sunda Strait during the transfer of 3,456 personnel from the liner Aquitania, considered too valuable to risk within enemy land based air range, to smaller vessels for onward transport to Singapore. (Note: Other ships in the covering force were HMAS Canberra, HMAS Vampire, HMS Dragon, HMS Express, USS Stewart, USS Barker, HMIS Jumna, HNLMS Van Nes and HNLMS Soemba.)

On the way back from a convoy assignment on 7 February 1942, Isabel was sent to rescue survivors from the Dutch merchant ship Van Cloon, which had been sunk by torpedoes and gunfire from a Japanese submarine, near Surabaya, Java. As Isabel picked up 187 survivors of Van Cloon, the Japanese submarine which had sunk Van Cloon, probably I-55, fired a torpedo at Isabel and surfaced nearby. The torpedo missed, and Isabel quickly drove the submarine down with gunfire and assisted a patrolling Dutch Catalina flying boat in dropping depth charges to drive it from the area.

By the time all ships were ordered to leave Java strong Japanese forces under Admirals Kondō and Nagumo were operating south between the islands and Australia. Isabel was among the last American ships to leave Java before the island fell to the Japanese and avoided the fate of other ships, including an entire four ship convoy and its escort HMAS Yarra, transiting the Japanese operating area and arrived in Australia on 7 March 1942 after seeing gunboat USS Asheville (PG-21) sunk during numerous Japanese air raids on the ships south of Java during the voyage to Australia. (Note: A useful map diagram is on page 630 in Gill's Australia in the War of 1939–1945 (navy) volume 1 showing ships sunk and fleeing Australian naval vessels.)

Based at Fremantle in Western Australia, Isabel took up new duties as escort and training ship for the U.S. Navy submarines now also based there, serving as a target for submarines practicing torpedo approaches. She also helped train allied submarines. Isabel remained on this duty until 27 August 1945, twelve days after hostilities with Japan ceased.

Isabel received one battle star for World War II service.

== Post-World War II service ==
Isabel had been considered for post-war service as flagship for the Philippine Sea Frontier, but the United States Seventh Fleet commander deemed her to be in too poor condition for such use. Instead, she departed Fremantle on 27 August 1945 and Australia entirely on 5 September 1945, headed for the United States. She called at Port Moresby, New Guinea; Manus Island; Majuro; Johnston Island; and Pearl Harbor, Hawaii on the voyage home. Isabel arrived at San Francisco, California on 26 October 1945.

== Decommissioning and disposal ==
A month later, a Navy inspection team deemed Isabel to be in such poor condition that she should be decommissioned, towed to sea, and sunk. She was decommissioned on 11 February 1946 and struck from the Navy List on 26 February 1946, but rather than being sunk, she was sold for scrap on 2 March 1946. Scrapping began on 25 March 1946.

== Awards ==
- World War I Victory Medal with "Destroyer" clasp
- Yangtze Service Medal
- China Service Medal
- American Defense Service Medal with "FLEET" clasp
- Asiatic–Pacific Campaign Medal with one battle star
- World War II Victory Medal
- Philippine Defense Medal with star
