= Ken Park =

2002 psychological teen drama film by Larry Clark

- German festival release poster
- Directed by: Larry Clark; Edward Lachman
- Screenplay by: Harmony Korine
- Based on: stories and journals by Larry Clark
- Produced by: Kees Kasander; Jean-Louis Piel
- Starring: James Ransone; Tiffany Limos; James Bullard; Stephen Jasso; Adam Chubbuck; Maeve Quinlan
- Cinematography: Larry Clark; Ed Lachman
- Edited by: Andrew Hafitz
- Production companies: The Kasander Film Company; Cinéa
- Distributed by: Vitagraph Films (US); A-Film Distribution (Netherlands); Pan-Européenne (France); Fortissimo Films
- Release dates: August 31, 2002 (Telluride); September 10, 2002 (Toronto); April 3, 2003 (Netherlands); October 8, 2003 (France)
- Running time: 93 minutes
- Countries: United States; Netherlands; France
- Language: English
- Budget: $1.2 million

Ken Park is a 2002 psychological teen film directed by Larry Clark and Edward Lachman. Set in the city of Visalia, California, it revolves around the abusive and dysfunctional lives of four teenagers following the suicide of their mutual acquaintance, the eponymous Ken Park. It was written by Harmony Korine, who based it on Clark's journals and stories. The film premiered at the Telluride Film Festival on September 10, 2002, but has not been officially shown in the United States since. It was also banned in Australia due to its content.

== Plot ==
The title character Ken Park (nicknamed "Krap Nek": his name spelled and pronounced backward), is a teenager skateboarding across Visalia, California. He arrives at a skate park, where he casually sets up a camcorder, smiles, and shoots himself in the temple with a handgun. His death is used to bookend the film, which follows the lives of four other teenagers who knew him.

Shawn is the most stable of the four main characters. Throughout the story, he has an ongoing sexual relationship with his girlfriend's mother Rhonda, whom he tells that he fantasizes about being with while having sex with her daughter, Hannah. He casually socializes with their family, the rest of whom are completely unaware of the affair.

Claude fends off physical and emotional abuse from his alcoholic father, who detests him for not being masculine enough, all while he tries to care for his pregnant mother, who makes little to no attempt at defending him. However, after coming home drunk one night, he attempts to perform oral sex on Claude, prompting the boy to run away from home.

Peaches is a girl who lives alone with her obsessive and highly-religious father, who fixates on her as the innocent embodiment of her deceased mother. When he catches her having sex with her boyfriend Curtis – whom she has playfully tied to her bed – he beats the boy and savagely disciplines her, then forces her to participate in a quasi-incestuous wedding ritual with him.

Tate is an unstable and sadistic adolescent living with his grandparents, whom he resents and abuses verbally. He engages in autoerotic asphyxiation while masturbating to a video of a woman playing tennis. He eventually kills his grandparents, in retaliation for petty grievances, and finds that it arouses him sexually. He records himself on his tape recorder so that the police will know how and why he did it, puts his grandfather's dentures in his mouth, lies naked in his bed, and falls asleep; eventually being found and promptly arrested.

The film cuts frequently between these subplots, with no overlap of characters or events until the end, when Shawn, Claude, and Peaches meet and have a threesome. In a game of "who am I?" afterward, they refer to an unnamed person they know who is now dead. The film cuts to a title screen, followed by a flashback to before the opening scene. Ken has impregnated his girlfriend and taken a menial job. At the skate park, they discuss whether to abort the pregnancy, and she asks Ken rhetorically if he is glad his mother did not abort him; he does not answer.

== Cast ==
- James Ransone as Tate
- Tiffany Limos as "Peaches"
- James Bullard as Shawn
- Stephen Jasso as Claude
- Adam Chubbuck as Ken Park
- Maeve Quinlan as Rhonda
- Amanda Plummer as Claude's Pregnant Mother
- Wade Williams as Claude's Father
- Julio Oscar Mechoso as Peaches' Father
- Richard Riehle as "Murph" Murphy
- Bill Fagerbakke as Bob
- Eddie Daniels as Shawn's Mother
- Seth Gray as Shawn's Brother
- Patricia Place as Tate's Grandmother
- Harrison Young as Tate's Grandfather
- Zara McDowell as Zoe
- Mike Apaletegui as Curtis
- Larry Clark as Hot Dog Vendor

== Production ==
Clark attempted to write the first script for Ken Park, basing it on personal experiences and people with whom he had grown up. Dissatisfied with his own draft, he hired Harmony Korine to pen the screenplay.

Korine explained the writing of the film in a 2005 interview:

Ken Park was written right after Kids, before we had gotten the financing for Kids. Larry Clark realized I could write pretty well and that I understood a certain type of vernacular, the teenage vernacular. So he wrote down five things he wanted to see on a napkin in red ink. ... They were things that he wanted to see. Five images that he wanted to see, and with those images he wanted me to construct a basic narrative, like a certain kind of narrative. I wasn't interested in telling a kind of elliptical narrative, I wanted to deconstruct some stories. At that point, it was written literally right after I wrote Kids.

Clark ultimately used most of Korine's script. The arrangement was to film using digital video, but Clark and Lachman used 35mm film instead.

== Distribution ==
Although it was sold for distribution to some 30 countries, the film was not shown in the United Kingdom after director Larry Clark assaulted Hamish McAlpine, the head of the UK distributor for the film, Metro-Tartan. Clark alleged that McAlpine had said the September 11 attacks were "the best thing to ever happened to America" and that Israeli victims of Palestinian suicide bombers "deserved to die." McAlpine denied the accusations. Clark was arrested and spent several hours in custody, and McAlpine was left with a broken nose. The film has not been released in the United States since its initial showing at the Telluride Film Festival in 2002. Clark says that this is because of the producer's failure to get copyright releases for the music used. The film was banned in Australia due to its graphic sexual content and portrayals of underage sexual activity after it was refused a classification by the Australian Classification Board in 2003. A protest screening held in Sydney, hosted by film critic Margaret Pomeranz, was shut down by the police.

== Critical reception ==
Review aggregator website Rotten Tomatoes reports a 46% approval rating with an average score of 4.80/10 based on 13 reviews. Ed Gonzales of Slant Magazine noted some redeeming elements in an "otherwise familiar Kids procedural" in which "the parents are all monsters of some kind and there's an excuse for every teenager's bad behavior". Rob Gonsalves of eFilmCritic, wrote that the film "is about people lost in a haze of contempt and despair, trying to wrest some love or relief out of the situation." Michael Rechtshaffen of The Hollywood Reporter described it as "a ragingly controversial feature that makes it very tricky to distinguish between insightful and incite-ful." Todd McCarthy of Variety described it as "Beautifully crafted but emotionally dispiriting and alienating in its insistence on spotlighting only the negative aspects of life". Lee Marshall of Screen Daily wrote that "Clark, being Clark, pushes things a little too far; so a not entirely constructive tension is set up between the need to show and the desire to shock."

== Soundtrack ==
1. Bouncing Souls – "Lamar Vannoy"
2. Rancid – "Antennas"
3. Gary Stewart – "Out of Hand"
4. Tha Alkaholiks – "Likwit"
5. KMD – "What a Nigga Know"
6. Blackalicious – "Deception"
7. Merle Haggard – "Mom and Dad's Waltz"
8. Black Star – "Brown Skin Lady"
9. Jerry Lee Lewis – "Good Time Charlie's Got the Blues"
10. The Roots – "Do You Want More?!!!??!"
11. Gary Stewart – "Shady Streets"
12. Quasimoto – "Put a Curse on You"
13. Hank Ballard – "Henry's Got Flat Feet"
14. The Shaggs – "Who Are Parents?"

== See also ==
- Kids (film)
