= Tulsa (book) =

1971 book by Larry Clark

- Front cover
- Author: Larry Clark
- Subject: Non-fiction
- Publication place: United States

Tulsa is a collection of black-and-white photographs by Larry Clark of the life of young people in Tulsa, Oklahoma. Its publication in 1971 "caused a sensation within the photographic community", leading to a new interest in autobiographical work.

Later better known for directing the movie Kids, Clark was a Tulsa native and a drug addict during the period (1963–1971) when he took the photographs. The book is prefaced by the statement:

i was born in tulsa oklahoma in 1943. when i was sixteen i started shooting amphetamine. i shot with my friends everyday for three years and then left town but i've gone back through the years. once the needle goes in it never comes out. L.C.

Tulsa, Clark's first book, was published in 1971 by Lustrum Press, owned by Ralph Gibson. It has been claimed that thanks to Gene Pitney's 1960 song "Twenty Four Hours from Tulsa", Tulsa then represented "young love and family values"; Clark's book challenged this with scenes of young people having sex, shooting up drugs, and playing with guns.

Clark has said that he "didn't take these photographs as a voyeur, but as a participant in the phenomenon", and commentary on the book has emphasized how Clark did not just live with the teenagers portrayed but "did drugs with them, slept with them, and included himself in the photographs"; this conferred an authenticity on the work, which brought it great praise.

Criticism of Tulsa has not been limited to a visceral rejection of images of drugtaking, casual sex, and gunplay; Martin Parr and Gerry Badger say that the "incessant focus [of Tulsa and Clark's 1983 book Teenage Lust] on the sleazy aspect of the lives portrayed, to the exclusion of almost anything else — whether photographed from the 'inside' or not — raises concerns about exploitation and drawing the viewer into a prurient, voyeuristic relationship with the work."

== Photographic technique ==
Clark discusses his techniques in the book Darkroom, published in 1977 by Lustrum Press. Referring specifically to Tulsa he says: "I do a lot of burning and dodging when making a print and then use bleach. There's not a straight print in the TULSA book. when I'm photographing I always try to shoot against the light (refers to the cover image from Tulsa entitled 'Dead, 1970'). The film can't handle this and everything gets burned up, since I'm exposing for the shadows."

== Exhibitions and collections ==
- George Eastman House (Rochester, New York) possesses a complete set of the fifty prints used to make the original book.
- The International Center of Photography (New York) has shown the prints, together with others not included in the book.
- The Groninger Museum (Groningen) bought the series of prints in 1998 and exhibited them in January–April 2005.
- Maison européenne de la photographie (Paris) showed the series from October 2007 to January 2008.
- The Columbia Museum of Art shows the series from October 2009 till February 2009.
- The Whitney Museum holds 69 works by Clark including the cover image from Tulsa.
- The Chrysler Museum of Art owns the Tulsa series.
- The Zimmerli Art Museum at Rutgers University owns the Tulsa series.

== Editions ==
- Tulsa. New York: Lustrum Press, 1971. Paperback. OCLC 1074006958.
- Tulsa. New York: Larry Clark, [1979] ("1971"). Hardback.
- Tulsa. 1983.
- Tarusa (タルサ) / Tulsa. Tokyo: Taka Ishii Gallery. 1996. Hardback. Edition of 1000. OCLC 38442374.
- Tulsa. S.l.: Printed Matter, 1999. OCLC 82804556.
- Tulsa. New York: Grove, 2000.
  - Hardback in slipcase, with print. Edition of 250. ISBN 0-8021-1678-7.
  - Hardback. ISBN 0-8021-1677-9.
  - Paperback. ISBN 0-8021-3748-2.
