= USS Sacramento (PG-19) =

Gunboat of the United States Navy

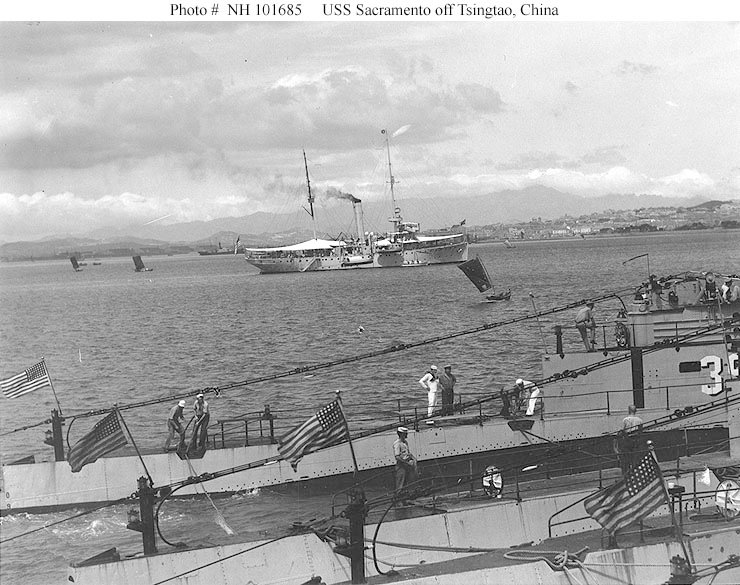
- USS Sacramento steaming off Tsingtao, China.

History

United States
- Name: USS Sacramento
- Namesake: Sacramento, California
- Builder: William Cramp & Sons, Philadelphia
- Yard number: 403
- Launched: 21 February 1914
- Commissioned: 26 April 1914
- Decommissioned: 6 February 1946
- Reclassified: PG-19, 17 July 1920
- Honors and awards: 2 battle stars (World War II)
- Fate: Sold for mercantile service, 23 August 1947

General characteristics
- Type: Gunboat
- Displacement: 1,425 long tons (1,448 t)
- Length: 226 ft 2 in (68.94 m)
- Beam: 40 ft 10.5 in (12.459 m)
- Draft: 12 ft 6.5 in (3.823 m)
- Speed: 12 kn (14 mph; 22 km/h)
- Complement: 171 officers and enlisted
- Armament: 3 × 4"/50 cal guns; 2 × 3-pounder guns; 2 × 1-pounder guns

The second USS Sacramento (PG-19) was a gunboat in the United States Navy.

Sacramento was launched on 21 February 1914 by the William Cramp & Sons Shipbuilding Company, Philadelphia; sponsored by Miss Phebe Briggs; and commissioned on 26 April 1914 at the Philadelphia Navy Yard under the command of Commander Luke McNamee.

== Construction and design ==
In 1911, it was decided to order a new gunboat as a cheaper alternative to the US Navy's Denver-class cruisers, designed to patrol in the Caribbean. The new ship would carry much less armament and not be able to carry troops, allowing a much smaller ship. Construction of the ship was authorized by Act of Congress on 4 March 1911, but no shipyard was willing to build the Navy's design for the target cost of $500,000, and the Navy was forced to further reduce the design, cutting speed and range, before it could be ordered.

The final design was 226 feet 2 inches (68.94 m) long overall and 210 feet (64.01 m) long between perpendiculars, with a beam of 40 feet 10 inches (12.45 m) and a draft of 11 feet 6 inches (3.51 m). The ship was of flush decked design and was made of steel. Displacement was 1,425 long tons (1,448 t) normal and 1,592 long tons (1,618 t) full load. A single three-cylinder triple expansion engine, rated at 950 indicated horsepower (710 kW), drove a single shaft, and were supplied with two Babcock & Wilcox coal-fired water-tube boilers feeding steam at 215 pounds per square inch (1,480 kPa). This gave a contract speed of 12.5 knots (23.2 km/h; 14.4 mph). 428 t of coal were carried, giving a range of 4,000 nautical miles (7,400 km; 4,600 mi).

The ship was armed with three 4-inch 50 calibre guns, with two 3-pounder saluting guns and two 1-pounder guns. The ship had a complement of 163 officers and men.

Sacramento (or Gunboat No. 19) was ordered from William Cramp & Sons at a contract price of $492,500, and was laid down at Cramp's Philadelphia shipyard on 30 April 1913. She was launched on 21 February 1914, and successfully met her contracted speed during sea trials on 31 March–1 April, reaching a maximum speed of 13.260 knots (24.558 km/h; 15.259 mph) and an average speed of 12.781 knots (23.670 km/h; 14.708 mph) on a 4-hour speed run. She was commissioned on 26 April 1914.

== Service history ==
=== World War I ===
Sacramento's first duty was in Mexican and Caribbean waters, and she arrived off Vera Cruz on 14 May 1914. Sacramento visited Dominican, Mexican, Nicaraguan, and Honduran ports repeatedly into 1916, protecting U.S. interests and observing uneasy local political conditions. Arriving at New Orleans on 17 March 1917, Sacramento's crew assisted U.S. Customs authorities in taking over the interned German merchant vessels Breslau, Andromeda, Anna, Louise, and Teresa after the U.S. entered World War I.

Departing New Orleans on 15 April, Sacramento proceeded to Newport, Rhode Island, to commence patrol and escort duty off the New England coast. She rescued the crew of the burning British motor ship Sebastian on 8 May and vainly attempted to tow her to Newport, receiving commendation from the British government for her efforts. In late June, she took part in refloating the grounded cruiser Olympia.

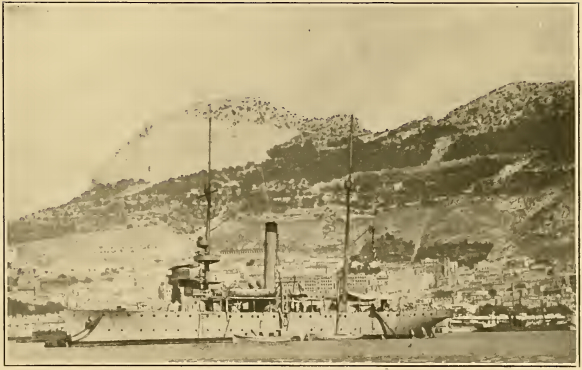
Sacramento at the base

Assigned to European waters, Sacramento departed New York on 22 July in company with a British mercantile convoy bound for Gibraltar, arriving on 6 August. As a unit of the U.S. Patrol Force based at Gibraltar, she performed continuous convoy escort duty to the British Isles with additional service along the North African and Italian coasts into 1918. Following the Armistice, Sacramento was ordered back to the U.S. She departed Gibraltar on 11 December 1918 for New Orleans.

=== Inter-war period ===
After completing repairs there, the gunboat steamed to New York prior to her next assignment with the U.S. Naval Forces, Northern Russia. Sacramento arrived at Murmansk on 22 May 1919; and, through July, served as a dispatch ship, distributed food and clothing, provided medical help, and assisted in the withdrawal of American forces from areas bordering the White Sea. Subsequently, sailing southward, Sacramento called at Norwegian, British, and French ports before arriving at Gibraltar on 20 September to assist in demobilizing the naval forces there. She returned to Hampton Roads, on 15 February 1920 to join the Atlantic Patrol Force and Special Service Squadron.

Designated PG-19 on 17 July 1920, Sacramento's new assignment took her back to Caribbean waters where she spent considerable time cruising off troubled Honduras.

==== Asiatic Squadron ====
She was reassigned to the Asiatic Squadron in 1922, and departed Charleston, South Carolina, on 12 June en route for the Philippine Islands. Passing through the Mediterranean and transiting the Suez Canal, Sacramento called at Bombay, Colombo, and Singapore while progressing eastward to Manila. Her Asiatic Fleet service was spent largely in Chinese and Japanese ports but included a visit to Vladivostok, Russia from 11 September-24 November 1922. She remained on station until 21 December 1928, when she departed Cavite for Caribbean duty.

She sailed first to Mare Island, California, then joined the Special Service Squadron and cruised the Caribbean, calling at Central American and West Indies ports, into 1932. She departed Balboa, Canal Zone, on 11 January 1932 bound for San Diego and San Francisco, preparatory to crossing the Pacific for duty with the Asiatic Fleet. She arrived at Shanghai, China, on 1 April 1932 and remained in adjacent waters throughout the gradually worsening crisis, just short of war, during the rest of the 1930s. With other U.S. forces, she helped to protect national interests during this period. Ordered home toward the end of the decade, the veteran gunboat departed Cavite on 12 January 1939 for New York, via the Mediterranean. She earned the nickname "the Galloping Ghost of the China Coast".

Sacramento served as a training ship for 9th Naval District Reservists, on the Great Lakes, from 20 November 1939 into 1940. Returning to the Boston Navy Yard for refitting, she subsequently departed the Norfolk Navy Yard en route to her next assignment in the Hawaiian Islands.

=== World War II ===
Entering Pearl Harbor on 15 August 1941, she was assigned to the Naval Coastal Force of the 14th Naval District, with fellow gunboat Niagara and U.S. Coast Guard patrol boats Reliance and Tiger. At the time of the Japanese attack on 7 December 1941, Sacramento was berthed in the Navy Yard's repair berth B-6, with destroyers Mugford and Jarvis nested beside her. Sacramento's battle stations were manned by 08:00; two minutes later, her gun crews opened fire on Japanese aircraft attacking "Battleship Row" off Ford Island. Her batteries assisted in destroying one enemy plane which crossed her bow 200 yd (180 m) ahead and later helped down another which was pressing home an attack on Nevada. Her boat crews participated in rescue and salvage operations throughout the aftermath of the battle.

Sacramento patrolled the Hawaiian Sea Frontier out of Pearl Harbor until 27 September 1942, when she commenced service as a tender for Torpedo Boat Unit 6, Division 2, of MTBRon 1, at Palmyra Island, south of Hawaii; with additional duty as air-sea rescue vessel for the Naval Air Station. She departed Palmyra on 25 November for San Diego and duty with the Western Sea Frontier patrol force. There she trained gun crews from December of that year to March 1945. Based at San Francisco thereafter, Sacramento operated on weather patrol and plane guard station for the remainder of World War II.

Sacramento was decommissioned on 6 February 1946 at Suisun Bay, California, and simultaneously transferred to the War Shipping Administration for disposal. She was sold on 23 August 1947 for mercantile service, initially operating under Italian registry as Fermina.

== Awards ==
- Mexican Service Medal 21 April 1914 to 23 April 1914
- Haitian Campaign Medal 9 July 1915 to 6 December 1915
- Dominican Campaign Medal 5 May 1916 to 4 December 1916
- Victory Medal
- Yangtze Service Medal
- Second Nicaraguan Campaign Medal 27 August 1926 and 2 January 1933
- China Service Medal
- American Defense Service Medal with "FLEET" clasp
- Asiatic–Pacific Campaign Medal with two battle stars (Dates: Code; 21 Jun 45 – 30 Jun 45 P34-1; 7 Dec 41 P1)
- American Campaign Medal
- World War II Victory Medal

- ***

== See also ==
- List of patrol vessels of the United States Navy
