= USS Lark (AM-21) =

Lapwing-class minesweeper

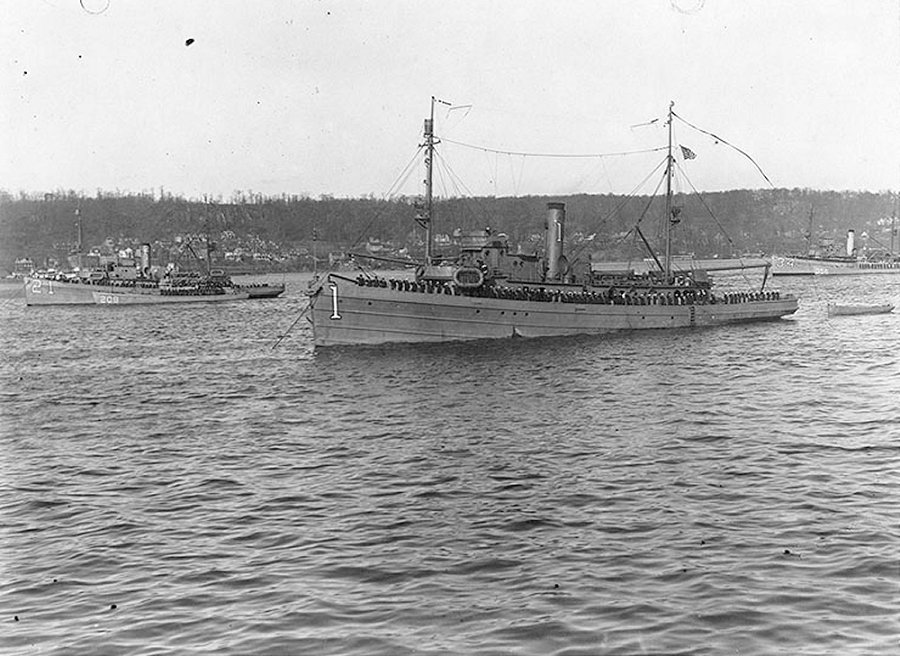
- USS Lark on left

History

United States
- Name: USS Lark
- Builder: Baltimore Dry Dock & Shipbuilding Co., Baltimore, Maryland
- Laid down: 11 March 1918
- Launched: 6 August 1918
- Commissioned: 12 April 1919, as Minesweeper No.21
- Decommissioned: 7 February 1946
- Reclassified: AM-21, 17 July 1920; AT-168, 1 March 1942; ATO-168, 15 May 1944
- Honours and awards: 2 battle stars (World War II)
- Fate: Transferred to the Maritime Commission for disposal, 15 January 1947

General characteristics
- Class & type: Lapwing-class minesweeper
- Displacement: 950 long tons (965 t)
- Length: 187 ft 10 in (57.25 m)
- Beam: 35 ft 6 in (10.82 m)
- Draft: 9 ft 9 in (2.97 m)
- Speed: 11.4 knots (21.1 km/h; 13.1 mph)
- Complement: 72
- Armament: 2 × .50 cal (12.7 mm) machine guns

The first USS Lark (AM-21) was a Lapwing-class minesweeper in the United States Navy. She was named for the lark.

Lark was laid down 11 March 1918 by Baltimore Dry Dock & Shipbuilding Co., Baltimore, Maryland; launched 6 August 1918; sponsored by Mrs. Henry A. Stanley; and commissioned 12 April 1919.

== World War I mine clearance duties ==
Lark departed Boston, Massachusetts 3 July 1919 to join the North Sea Minesweeping Detachment at Kirkwall, Orkney, Scotland. Reporting 15 July, she participated in the last three operations conducted to clear the more than 70,000 mines laid during World War I. The U.S. Navy had laid more than 80 percent of these mines and had accepted the responsibility of removing them. With the conclusion of the final sweep, 19 September, Lark returned to Kirkwall for a brief rest after the assignment, made more dangerous by the strong winds, rough seas, and poor visibility of the North Sea. She got underway for the United States 1 October and steaming via Plymouth, England, Brest, and Lisbon, and arrived in New York 19 November.

== Post-World War I operations ==
The minesweeper operated from Gloucester, Massachusetts, along the U.S. East Coast, with winter deployments in the Caribbean, until 1931. During that period she transited the Panama Canal twice, on a voyage to Hawaii for Fleet Problem V in 1925. On 2 February 1931 she departed the Massachusetts coast for the Pacific Ocean, arriving at Oahu 25 April. She operated out of Pearl Harbor for the next 10 years, making periodic cruises to Samoa.

In 1941, as tension increased in the Far East, Lark was ordered to the Philippines. Departing 8 May she headed for Manila, arriving 31 May and reporting for duty with Mine Division 9, Asiatic Fleet, at Cavite soon afterwards. There on 8 December (7 December east of the International Date Line) she received word of the Japanese attack on Pearl Harbor and prepared for a similar move on Cavite. The expected worst came on the 10th.

== Surviving Japanese attack on the Philippines ==
After aiding survivors of the bombing of the Navy Yard, Lark worked her way south to the Netherlands East Indies. Arriving in Javanese waters on the 22nd, she began minesweeping and antisubmarine patrol. At first operating out of Surabaya, she moved in February 1942 to Tjilatjap, the last Allied port in Java. On 1 March she was ordered to western Australia to protect the new logistics center at Exmouth Gulf, and for the next two years cruised the coast of Australia from Exmouth Gulf to Fremantle.

== Conversion to fleet tug ==
Redesignated twice, as fleet tug AT-168 on 1 March 1944, and again on 15 May as ATO-168, Lark arrived at Brisbane for overhaul and conversion 20 May. Conversion complete, Lark departed for the Admiralties on 6 July. She served there four months in towing and rescue activities, operating between Manus, Milne Bay, Hollandia, and Morotai. On 13 October Lark sailed from Melanesia and joined a convoy headed for San Pedro Bay, Philippine Islands. Dropping anchor on Leyte Gulf on the 25th, she remained off Leyte until 9 November rendering assistance to naval vessels and merchantmen damaged during the fighting and the typhoon winds which followed.

Standing out in convoy from Leyte Gulf on 9 November, Lark, with USS Vireo (AT-144) in tow, steamed for Hollandia. There she resumed towing and salvage duties, operating in the New Guinea-Admiralties area until 16 October 1945. She then departed Manus for Majuro en route Pearl Harbor, arriving 9 November.

== Decommissioning ==
Ordered to San Francisco, two weeks later, she decommissioned 7 February 1946, and 15 January 1947 was transferred to the Maritime Commission for disposal.

Lark received two battle stars for World War II service.
