= 26th Japan Film Professional Awards =

Japanese film awards in 2017

- Date: April 13, 2017
- Site: Theatre Shinjuku, Tokyo, Japan

The 26th Japan Film Professional Awards (第26回日本映画プロフェッショナル大賞) was the 26th edition of the Japan Film Professional Awards. It awarded the best of 2016 in film. The ceremony took place on April 13, 2017, at Theatre Shinjuku in Tokyo.

== Awards ==
- Best Film: Destruction Babies
- Best Director: Tatsuya Mori (Fake)
- Best Actress: Haru Kuroki (A Bride for Rip Van Winkle)
- Best Actor: Masaki Suda (Seto and Utsumi, Drowning Love)
- New Director: Hiroshi Shōji (Ken and Kazu)
- Emerging Actress: Mone Kamishiraishi (Drowning Love, Chihayafuru Part 1 / Part 2)
- Emerging Actress: Yuki Mamiya (Wet Woman in the Wind)
- Special: Kazuhiro Sano (But Only Love)
- Special Achievement: Genjiro Arato (For his many years of service.)

== 10 best films ==
1. Destruction Babies (Tetsuya Mariko)
2. Harmonium (Koji Fukada)
3. A Bride for Rip Van Winkle (Shunji Iwai)
4. Sharing (Makoto Shinozaki)
5. Fake (Tatsuya Mori)
6. Over the Fence (Nobuhiro Yamashita)
7. Himeanole (Keisuke Yoshida)
8. The Long Excuse (Miwa Nishikawa)
9. The Projects (Junji Sakamoto)
10. Seto and Utsumi (Tatsushi Ōmori)
