= Chaika: The Coffin Princess =

Japanese light novel series

- Cover art for Chaika - The Coffin Princess featuring Chaika Trabant.

棺姫のチャイカ (Hitsugi no Chaika)
- Genre: Action, fantasy
- Light novel
- Written by: Ichirō Sakaki
- Illustrated by: Namaniku ATK
- Published by: Fujimi Shobo
- Imprint: Fujimi Fantasia Bunko
- Original run: December 18, 2010 – March 10, 2015
- Volumes: 12
- Manga
- Written by: Shinta Sakayama
- Published by: Kadokawa Shoten
- English publisher: NA: Yen Press
- Magazine: Shōnen Ace
- Original run: October 26, 2011 – December 26, 2014
- Volumes: 5
- Manga

Hitsugi no Chaikakka
- Written by: Kanikama
- Published by: Kadokawa Shoten
- Imprint: Shōnen
- Magazine: 4-Koma Nano Ace (2011–2013); Shōnen Ace (2014)
- Original run: August 9, 2011 – May 2014
- Volumes: 1
- Manga

Gakuen Chaika!
- Written by: Seri Minase
- Magazine: Niconico Age Premium
- Original run: January 9, 2014 – December 11, 2014
- Volumes: 1
- Anime television series
- Directed by: Soichi Masui
- Produced by: Jun'ichirō Tamura
- Written by: Touko Machida
- Music by: Seikou Nagaoka
- Studio: Bones
- Licensed by: AUS: Hanabee; NA: Sentai Filmworks; UK: Animatsu Entertainment (former); Anime Limited (current)
- Original network: Tokyo MX, Sun TV, TVQ, CTC, TV Saitama, GBS, MTV, tvk, BS11
- English network: NA: Anime Network
- Original run: April 9, 2014 – December 10, 2014
- Episodes: 22 + OVA
- icon

Chaika: The Coffin Princess (Japanese: 棺姫のチャイカ, Hepburn: Hitsugi no Chaika) is a Japanese light novel series written by Ichirō Sakaki and illustrated by Namaniku ATK. Twelve volumes of the series have been published by Fujimi Shobo under their Fujimi Fantasia Bunko imprint. It has been adapted into three manga series. An anime adaptation was announced in July 2013 and aired from April 9, 2014, to June 25, 2014. A second season titled Chaika The Coffin Princess: Avenging Battle aired from October 8, 2014, to December 10, 2014.

== Plot ==
Five years ago, the 300-year-long war between the Alliance of Six Nations and the Gaz Empire finally came to an end when Emperor Arthur Gaz was killed by the Eight Heroes. The Empire's lands were then divided by the alliance, who later formed the Council of Six Nations to bring peace and order to the land. In addition, Gaz's remains, which possessed incredible magical energy, were divided up and granted to each of the Eight Heroes, who used their shares for various reasons.

In the present, Toru Acura is an unemployed Saboteur (乱破師(サバター), Sabatā) who is unable to settle in this peaceful era as there is no demand for his Saboteur skills, and thus he sees no meaning in his life. While out foraging in the forest, Toru encounters Chaika Trabant, a white-haired Wizard (魔法師(ウィザード), Wizādo) who travels with a coffin. After saving her from a man-eating unicorn, Toru, along with his sister Akari, are hired by Chaika to gather the scattered remains of Arthur Gaz. It is revealed that Chaika is the former Emperor's daughter, who managed to escape in the chaos following her father's death and wishes to find her father's remains so that she can give him a proper burial. Over the course of the series, the group faces difficulties while facing against each of the Eight Heroes. Frederika, a shape-shifting dragoon who belonged to one of the heroes, joins their party. Meanwhile, the six nations sends the Kleeman Agency's Gillette Corps to hunt down Chaika to obstruct their quest in order to prevent another war. Other groups led by girls claiming to be Chaika Gaz also pursue them to take the parts.

== Characters ==
=== Main characters ===
Toru Acura (トール・アキュラ, Tōru Akyura)
Voiced by: Junji Majima^{Ep. 1 credits} (Japanese); Leraldo Anzaldua^{Ep. 1 credits} (English)
The protagonist is a Saboteur from the village of Acura. He has dark hair and eyes,^{LN 1} but in the anime he has dark blue hair.^{Ep. 1} After the downfall of the Gaz Empire and the return of peace, he has lost his way of life. When introduced, he is jobless and poor, and initially mistaken by Chaika to be a bandit attempting to rob her. However they inadvertently encounter a man-eating Unicorn and they work together to defeat it.^{Ep. 1} He has the power of the mysterious Iron-Blood Form (also Iron-Blood Transformation) that when activated turn his hair red and cause crimson markings to appear on his body. He wields two short sword comblades that have retractable wires at their hilts. While he tries to keep their relationship as client and servant, Toru soon develops feelings for Chaika. He is named after Acura, the luxury automobile division of Honda.
Chaika Trabant (チャイカ・トラバント, Chaika Torabanto)
Voiced by: Chika Anzai^{Ep. 1 credits} (Japanese); Kira Vincent-Davis^{Ep. 1 credits} (English)^{Ep. 1 credits}
The titular character of the series, Chaika is a young magic-user with silver hair and purple eyes who lugs around a giant coffin.^{Ep. 2} She is the Princess of the Gaz Empire and Arthur Gaz's surviving heir.^{Ep. 2} She's also sensitive about the thickness of her eyebrows. For most of the series, she speaks a broken and disjointed form of the common language.^{Ep. 1} After their close-encounter with the unicorn she hires Toru and his sister Akari to help her gather the remains, but over the course of the series, she also develops feelings for Toru. Her weapon is a Gundo Sniper Rifle, which allows her to cast high-precision spells.^{Ep. 1} She is noted to be the Chaika that most resembles the one that Stephan Hartgen killed who was the girl whom Gaz used as a model for the Chaikas. Her first name is derived from the GAZ Chaika, while her last name refers to the East German Trabant.
Akari Acura (アカリ・アキュラ, Akari Akyura)
Voiced by: Yuko Hara^{Ep. 1 credits} (Japanese); Joanne Bonasso^{Ep. 1 credits} (English)
Toru's younger sister and a fellow Saboteur. She is tall with black hair styled in a ponytail and dark eyes,^{LN 1 ch 1} but in the anime, she has green hair and blue eyes.^{Ep. 1} Although she calls Toru her brother, she is unrelated to him by blood but they are originally from the same area.^{LN 1}, ^{Ep. 4} Akari does not hide the fact that she is in love with Toru and is jealous of any other girl who gets close to him.^{Ep. 4, 5} She also uses the Iron-Blood Transformation; however, her markings do not crisscross like Toru's and are much thinner. Her weapon is a large war hammer with a retractable handle and a spike on one side of the head.
Frederika (フレドリカ, Furedorika)
Voiced by: Chiwa Saito^{Ep. 1 credits} (Japanese); Krystal LaPorte^{Ep. 4 credits} (Season 1), Hilary Haag (Season 2) (English)
A dragoon, which are a race of magical armored dragons with the ability to shape-shift. She appears as a blonde haired girl with red eyes, and sometimes a grey cat.^{Ep. 4} She was formerly partnered with Dominica Skoda, a Cavalier who made a pact with her during the war with the Gaz Empire in order to gain fame and riches for Dominica's younger sister, Lucie. However, after the war, Dominica discovered that Lucie had been killed by the villagers she ruled over when she refused to sell their family's land to them. Dominica and Frederika avenged Lucie by killing the villagers responsible, but Dominica soon died, due to having lost the will to live without her sister. Due to the close bond they shared, Frederika has been unable to forget her former master and has taken on Dominica's form and has been living as Dominica.^{Ep. 4} After losing a battle with Toru's group, she takes on the form of Lucie Skoda in honor of her master's sister. She also joins Toru's group on their adventures with a new goal: to engage Toru in a fight to the death, although Toru continually postpones their fight, claiming that he must first accomplish his mission to assemble Emperor Gaz's remains for Chaika.^{Ep. 4} At the end of the Soara arc, she proposes that Toru make a pact with her so that he can become a Dragoon Cavalier.^{Ep. 12} In episode 10 of season 2, Toru finally agreed to the contract and is no longer a Saboteur but a Dragoon Cavalier.

=== Secondary characters and groups ===
==== Chaika Bohdan ====
Chaika Bohdan (チャイカ・ボフダーン, Chaika Bofudān) (Voiced by: Saeko Zogo^{Ep. 1 credits} (Japanese); Brittney Karbowski^{Ep. 5 credits} (English)), known as Red Chaika, is a silver-haired girl who is very similar in appearance to Chaika Trabant, but wears a red frilled headband, has shorter hair, and a more developed chest. Like Trabant, she speaks in the broken and disjointed form of the common language.^{Ep. 5} Her weapon is a snake blade.^{Ep. 5} While Trabant wishes to collect the remains of her father to give them a proper burial, Bohdan intends to enact revenge upon the Eight Heroes by killing them.^{Ep. 5} After seeing that Toru is a capable fighter, she tries to have him and his sister join her cause, but they turn her down after she reveals she intends to kill the Chaika in their company as she claims there can only be one Chaika Gaz in this world.^{Ep. 5-6} Another thing she seems to have in common with Trabant is her attraction to Toru.

Bohdan has two companions:

- David (ダヴィード, Davīdo) (Voiced by: Kiyoshi Katsunuma^{Ep. 1 credits} (Japanese); Scott Gibbs^{Ep. 5 credits} (English)) has brown hair and wears a metal plate covering his forehead. He fights with a spear. He prefers big-breasted girls.^{Ep. 5}
- Selma Kenworth (セルマ・ケンワース, Seruma Kenwāsu) (Voiced by: Sarah Emi Bridcutt^{Ep. 1 credits} (Japanese); Allison Sumrall^{Ep. 5 credits} (English)) is a Wizard with long red-braided hair. She uses a Gundo Sniper Rifle in the anime.^{Ep. 5} She is named after Kenworth, an American truck manufacturer.

==== Kleemann Agency ====
The Postwar Reconstruction Implementation Agency (戦後復興推進機関, Sengo Fukkō Suishin Kikan), or more commonly called Kleemann Agency, is a multinational organization tasked with supporting the postwar reconstruction. The organization also includes a number of small field units such as the Gillette Corps and the Campagna Corps whose duty is the capture of bandits and other criminals.

Konrad Steinmetz (コンラート・シュタインメッツ, Konrāto Shutainmettsu)
Voiced by: Tetsuo Kanao^{Ep. 1 credits} (Japanese); Rutherford Cravens^{Ep. 2 credits} (English)
The head of the Kleemann Agency.^{LN 1}^{Ep. 2} The Council of Six Nations do not heed Konrad's warnings that Chaika Gaz is still alive. They consider reports of her continued existence nothing more than a myth. However, after incident involving the Soara floating fortress, the Council begins taking the Chaika issue seriously. He got his name from Steinmetz, an aftermarket company specialized in Opel vehicles.
Karen Bombardier (カレン・ボンバルディア, Karen Bonbarudia)
Voiced by: Naomi Ōzora^{Ep. 1 credits} (Japanese); Molly Searcy^{Ep. 2 credits} (English)
Konrad's assistant.^{LN 1} In the anime she has short green hair and wears glasses.^{Ep. 2}. She got her name from Bombardier Inc..

===== Gillette Corps =====
A division of the Kleemann Agency who have been tasked with capturing Chaika. In season 2 their task switches to gathering the emperor's remains.^{S2 ep. 2}

Albéric Gillette (アルベリック・ジレット, Aruberikku Jiretto)
Voiced by: Yoshimasa Hosoya (Japanese); Blake Shepard^{Ep. 1 credits} (English)
The leader of the Gillette Corps. A cavalier from a noble family, he wishes to stop Chaika Trabant's quest of reclaiming Arthur's remains which he fears might lead to another war.^{Ep. 2} However, after learning of Trabant's reasons for her quest and the lack concrete information about Emperor Gaz from official sources, he starts to have doubts about his mission.^{Ep. 5} When the Floating Fortress Stratus is sent by the Council of Six Nations to destroy the floating fortress Soara, he tries to stop the council forces from attacking, as his comrades Vivi and Zita are still trapped inside the Soara. However, he is supposedly killed when a large magic beam from the Soara strikes the council forces.^{Ep. 12} Later it was revealed that he survives the attack, due to Guy's intervention and now serves as the bodyguard of Stephan Hartgen, one of the Eight Heroes. Under Hartgen's control, he fights Nikolai and Vivi, and during the fight, the latter cuts off his hand, breaking him free of Hartgen's control. He is named after Gillet, a Belgian automobile manufacturer.
Nikolai Avtotor (ニコライ・アフトトル, Nikorai Afutotoru)
Voiced by: Kensuke Satou^{Ep. 1 credits} (Japanese); Andrew Love^{Ep. 1 credits} (English)
A mercenary and the second-in-command of the Gillette Corps. His hair is shaved in a triangular brown mohawk.^{Ep. 2 credits} After the supposed death of Albéric, Nikolai is promoted to Captain of the Gillette Corps. He is named after Avtotor, a Russian automobile company.
Vivi Holopainen (ヴィヴィ・ホロパイネン, Vivi Horopainen)
Voiced by: Iori Nomizu^{Ep. 1 credits} (Japanese); Luci Christian^{Ep. 3 credits} (English)
An orange-haired assassin who is in love with Albéric.^{Ep. 3} Her weapons are throwing needles.^{Ep. 7} Vivi and Zita were sent inside the floating fortress of Soara after its ruler, Duke Gavarni, rebelled against the Six Nations. She reluctantly forms a temporary alliance with Toru so that both groups can escape the Soara,^{Ep. 11} but upon returning to the Gillette Corps and learning of Albéric's supposed death, Vivi becomes mad with grief. As she screams in anguish, her hair and eyes turn white and purple respectively, revealing Vivi to be another Chaika.^{Ep. 12} According to Guy, Vivi is a "half-Chaika" due to her friends preventing the completion of her transformation.^{Ep. 13}
Zita Brusasco (ズィータ・ブルザスコ, Zīta Buruzasuko)
Voiced by: Yumeha Kōda^{Ep. 1 credits} (Japanese); Caitlynn French^{Ep. 2 credits} (English)
A green-haired female Wizard with glasses^{Ep. 3} who is good at handling machines and drives April, the Corps magic vehicle. Like Vivi, she too has a crush on Albéric but is willing to support her friend.^{Ep. 5} When she and Vivi were trapped in the Soara, she formed an alliance with Toru and his group, despite Vivi's objections, believing it to be the best chance for both groups to escape.^{Ep. 11}
Matheus Callaway (マテウス・キャラウェイ, Mateusu Kyarawei)
Voiced by: Shuta Morishima^{Ep. 1 credits} (Japanese); Mike Yager^{Ep. 1 credits} (English)
A male Wizard who can control creatures. He is bald but has markings across his face.^{Ep. 5, 6} He is named after Callaway Cars, an American automotive tuner.
Leonardo Stola (レオナルド・ストーラ, Reonarudo Sutōra)
Voiced by: Kazutomi Yamamoto^{Ep. 1 credits} (Japanese); Shannon Emerick^{Ep. 1 credits} (English)
A catboy demihuman and the Corp's spy.^{Ep. 5} During the war, demihumans like Leonardo where created to perform dangerous tasks that humans wouldn't do. Since the war has ended, many humans look down on his race. Because Albéric treats him like an equal, Leonardo has a deep respect for him.^{Ep. 9} He is constantly coming up with theories as to why there are more than one Chaikas; his current theory suggests that are all half sisters whose mothers were the Emperor's many wives. His last name comes from Stola, an Italian automotive engineering firm.

==== Soara ====
Soara is a sky fortress that was knocked down in the war with Gaz. It had since been repaired and was active in the final storyline of the first anime season. The group attempts to start a war by destroying Cadwell, the capital of the Wiemac kingdom but the plans are foiled by Toru's group and the Gillette Corps.

Ricardo Gavarni (リカルド・ガヴァーニ, Rikarudo Gavāni)
Voiced by: Megumi Ogata^{Ep. 10 JP credits} (Japanese); Greg Ayres^{Ep. 10 credits} (English)
The youngest son of Duke Gavarni. He has blond hair and blue eyes. A sadistic young man, he enjoys cutting open his victims.^{Ep. 10} He killed his family^{Ep. 10} and used his father's name to obtain one part of Arthur Gaz's remains and secretly took control of the floating fortress, Soara, with the help of Layla and Grato. He is responsible for torturing and killing the women in the village.^{Ep. 11} He later fights Toru only to be critically injured. Before succumbing to his wounds as the Soara sinks to the bottom of a lake, he apologises to Layla for not fulfilling her dream but is glad to be with her.^{Ep. 12}
Grato Lancia (グラート・ランシア, Gurāto Ranshia)
Voiced by: Hiroki Tōchi^{Ep. 10 JP credits} (Japanese); David Wald^{Ep. 10 credits} (English)
A wizard and Ricardo's assistant, he pilots the Soara. A former veteran of the Gaz Empire war, he wishes to reignite the war so he can continue his forbidden experiments. Using his mind control weapon spells, he helps Ricardo and Layla gather the minions they need to control the Soara.^{Ep. 10-12} He is named after Lancia, an Italian automotibile brand.
Layla (レイラ, Reira)
Voiced by: Yui Makino^{Ep. 10 JP credits} (Japanese); Katelyn Barr^{Ep. 10 credits} (English)
First appearing as an escaping prisoner, Layla soon reveals to Trabant that she is a Chaika herself, themed in blue. She made use of her knowledge of chemistry and wits to enthrall rich men to do her bidding, until she learned that she and the other Chaikas are just tools used to collect Arthur Gaz's remains. As a result, she abandoned her original mission, and chose to take revenge for being manipulated by plunging the continent into renewed conflict.^{Ep. 11} Along with Ricardo and Grato, she uses Arthur Gaz's left leg and Soara to capture women in the village and using their tormented despairing souls to harvest their memories as fuel for the fortress.^{Ep. 11} After the Soara is knocked down, she tries to kill Trabant, but is distracted by Guy, allowing Trabant to shoot her with her magic rifle. Injured herself, Layla stays behind and comforts a dying Ricardo, choosing to die together with him.^{Ep. 12}

==== Eight Heroes ====
The eight warriors who killed Emperor Arthur Gaz and split his body among them. Many of them serve as episodic antagonists in the anime series.

Roberto Abarth (ロベルト・アバルト, Roberuto Abaruto)
Voiced by: Takaya Hashi (Japanese); Scotty Fults^{Ep. 1 credits} (English)
Ruler of the town of Delsorant. Despite coming from a cavalier family, Roberto became a wizard after he injured his sword arm. His Gundo is his mansion and can control objects in it by using Arthur Gaz's left hand as its power source. His name comes from Abarth, an Italian manufacturer of performance cars.
Dominica Skoda (ドミニカ・スコダ, Dominika Sukoda)
Voiced by: Chiwa Saito^{Ep. 3} (Japanese); Krystal LaPorte^{Ep. 3} (English)
A dragoon cavalier and ruler of Ipsom.^{Ep. 3} She has blonde hair and red eyes.^{Ep. 4} She had Arthur Gaz's eyes.^{Ep. 4} Coming from a proud but poor cavalier family, Dominica joined the war hoping to gain titles and riches for herself and her beloved younger sister, Lucie, so that she would have a better life. To increase her chances, she made a pact with the dragoon Fredrika, which blossomed into a very close bond. However, upon her return home after the war, Dominica discovered that Lucie had been murdered by the villagers they ruled who had attempted to force Lucie to sell off the Skoda lands to them. In her grief and anger, Dominica and Fredrika killed all of the villagers responsible for Lucie's death. With her sister dead, Dominica lost the will to live and died. However, unable to forget her master, Fredrika took Dominica's form and pretended to be her. In the anime, Dominica dies from an illness after the war.^{Ep. 4} She is named after Skoda, an automaker from the Czech Republic.
Simon Scania (シモン・スカニア, Shimon Sukania)
Voiced by: Hiroyuki Kinoshita (Japanese); Luis Galindo^{Ep. 7 credits} (English)
A wizard from the Kingdom of Koenigsegg, who kept Arthur Gaz's right leg. After the war, he was betrayed by his best friend and wife and left to die. In anger, Simon created a fog machine fueled by Arthur's leg which causes those affected to see illusions of their loved ones betraying them, so that they will feel the pain he felt. When Toru and his group destroy the machine, they discover that Simon has been dead for a long time. In the anime, Simon is discovered to still be alive but he has gone mad. He gets his name from Scania AB, a Swedish truck manufacturer.
Claudia Dodge (クローディア・ダッジ, Kurōdia Dajji)
Voiced by: Masako Katsuki^{Ep. 1 credits} (Japanese); Kelly Manison (English)
The wizard who kept Arthur Gaz's heart and now runs a vineyard and winery. After the war, Claudia involves herself in the wine business and hired out of work soldiers to work her vineyard. Despite having one of Arthur's body parts, Claudia has no interest in it, as it was only given to her as a token that she was one of the eight Heroes. It is noted that she is the only of the Eight Heroes who did not suffer any ill fortune after the war nor was she corrupted by the madness of the remains. She says that she always felt something draw her away from using the remains whenever she thought of it. Claudia is surprisingly friendly to Toru's group, especially to Chaika Trabant, despite being her father's killer, and agree to give them Arthur's heart to them provided that they fight her in a duel. After Chaika wins the duel, Claudia throws a tea party to celebrate and even gives Toru's group clues about Emperor Gaz and the locations of the other Heroes before they continue on their journey. As a wizard, she wields a Gundo shotgun and can cast and fire shorter spells which she later teaches to Chaika.^{S2 ep. 1-2} She is named after Dodge, an American car brand.
Glen Donkervoort (グレン・ドンカーブート, Guren Donkābūto)
Voiced by: Shigeru Ushiyama (Japanese); David Wald (English)
An archer who lives in a forest who kept Arthur Gaz's right arm. He gives up his remains to Chaika Bohdan's group after they defeat him.^{S2 ep. 2} He gets his name from Donkervoort, a Dutch sports car manufacturer.
Clay Morgan (クレイ・モーガン, Kurei Mōgan)
Voiced by: Hiroshi Iwasaki (Japanese); Mark X Laskowski (English)
A former halberd wielder who rules a coast town near the ocean who kept Arthur Gaz's ears. After the war he suffered from post-traumatic stress disorder and succumbed to near madness. He maintains a fragile grasp on his sanity by hiring people to perform comedy routines for him. When he sees Chaika his sanity crumbles and he flees with Toru and Akari in pursuit. They corner him and are able to persuade him that they will leave him alone in exchange for the remains in his possession. When Chaika goes to the secret island by herself, Toru and Akari pressure him to provide them a boat. He was likely named after the Morgan Motor Company, a British sports car manufacturer.
Alan Tramontana (アラン・トラモンターナ, Aran Toramontāna)
A Viscount whose remains ended up in Duke Gavanni's possession. He is named after the Tramontana, a Spanish supercar.

==== Secret Island Complex ====
Viktor Izhmash (ヴィクトル・イズマッシュ, Vikutoru Izumasshu)
Voiced by: Masayuki Omoro (Japanese); John Gremillion (English)
The former assistant director of the Gaz Empire Institute of Magic. During the last days of the war, Arthur Gaz assigned Viktor a special assignment in the event of his death and he was sent to a secret island hidden by magic where he and his staff attempted to mass produced and clone Fayla creatures and demihumans that they could control. Layla learned the horrible truth of her origins when she visited the island. When both White Chaika, Red Chaika and their companions travel to the island to find Arthur's hidden fortune, both girls are captured by Viktor's men. Viktor then tells them the horrible truth; Arthur never had a daughter and all of the girls who claim to be Princess Chaika were actually orphans from the war who were brainwashed into believing they were the princess and were made to look like Princess Chaika as part of Arthur's plan to gather his remains after his death. Viktor then attempts dissect both Chaikas as part of his experiments with Niva Lada, but the Chaikas escape and both of them and their companions fight his clone army. He is killed by the combined efforts of Chaika Trabant and Niva. Before succumbing to his wounds, he realizes Niva was created to help the Chaikas.
Kiril Tatra 47 (キリルタトラ47, Kiriru Tatora 47)
Voiced by: Kazuyuki Okitsu (Japanese); Gareth West (English)
Captain of the Island Complex's demi-human guards. Like most of the demi-humans stationed there, he is resentful of his employers due to the way they treat him, but this same resentment also drives him to do his best, so that neither he nor the other demi-humans come to harm.
Ursula Tatra 12 (ウルスラ・タトラ12, Urusura Tatora 12)
Voiced by: Nao Tōyama (Japanese); Cynthia Martinez (English)
A demi-human non-combat subordinate at the Island Complex. She has feelings for Kiril and befriends Chaika Trabant. She and Kiril are both named after Tatra, a Czech vehicle manufacturer.
Niva Lada (ニーヴァ・ラーダ, Nīvu~a Rāda)
Voiced by: Sachie Hirai (Japanese); Brittany Djie (English)
A living Gundo in the form of a young girl. She has the ability to transform to suit her user and seems to have been created by Izhmash at the Emperor's order to assist the Chaikas in gathering the Emperor's remains. When working with Chaika Trabant, Niva turns into a giant gundo cannon that casts very powerful magic. However in the Principality of Hartgen, she was retrieved by Guy who informs a chagrined Chaika Trabant that acquiring Niva was part of her "mission". She is named after the Lada Niva.

==== Principality of Hartgen ====
Stephan Hartgen (シュテファン・ハルトゲン, Shutefan Harutogen)
Voiced by: Jin Yamanoi (Japanese); Josh Morrison (English)
The King of the Principality of Hartgen and leader of the Eight Heroes who supposedly killed Princess Chaika during the war. He possesses Arthur Gaz's head and bored with the lack of strife that came with the end of the war, he decides to start a new war by assembling strong soldiers and gathering the remains under the guidance of Guy and Black Chaika. However, it is later revealed that he was being manipulated by them for their own ends and he is killed.
Alina and Irina Hartgen (アリーナ & イリーナ・ハルトゲン, Arīna & Irīna Harutogen)
Voiced by: Yui Ariga (Alina), Yū Shimamura (Irina) (Japanese); Shanae’a Moore (Alina), Robin Nennig (Irina) (English)
Also known as the Purple Chaikas, they are the adopted daughters of Stephan Hartgen and Princesses of the Principality of Hartgen. They are the only Chaika clones who are uninterested in gathering the remains, but are instead content with letting Black Chaika do the work with their father. After Stephan Hartgen's death, they laugh and proclaim that their "real father" had killed their "fake father", and stay with the newly resurrected Arthur Gaz as he launches his plan for a continental war. Stephan, Alina and Irina is named after Hartge, a German automotive tuner.
Chaika Kamaz (チャイカ・カマズ, Chaika Kamazu)
Voiced by: Sakura Tange (Japanese); Carli Mosier (English)
Also known as Black Chaika, she is the "eldest daughter" of Stephan Hartgen. She came to Hartgen's castle and manipulated him into thinking that he could become the second "Emperor Gaz" despite herself finding war-mongers to be simply "father's play things". She accomplishes the mission of gathering all of the remains through her manipulations and uses them to revive Arthur Gaz. Afterwards she proclaims herself to be the "Queen Bee Chaika" and that all other Chaikas are only "Worker Bees". She bears the most resemblance to Chaika Trabant. Her last name refers to Kamaz, a Russian truck manufacturer.
Shin Acura (シン・アキュラ, Shin Akyura)
Voiced by: Takahiro Sakurai (Japanese); Adam Gibbs (English)^{Ep. 1 credits}
Toru and Akari's mentor as a saboteur.^{Ep. 9} He is revealed to have been working for Stephan, but with the latter's death he is now unemployed.

==== Other characters ====
Arthur Gaz (アルトゥール・ガズ, Arutūru Gazu)
Voiced by: Hideaki Tezuka (Japanese); John Swasey (English)
The Emperor of the Gaz Empire. Arthur was a genius who created new technologies and magic that modernized the continent. Despite this, he was despised and feared by others which led to a 200-year-long war between an alliance of the Six Nations and the Gaz Empire. Due to his magic, Arthur was practically immortal and had lived for around 500 years before he was killed by the Eight Heroes. His body was divided among the Eight Heroes since they produced potent magic.^{LN 1} However, the remains affected all who used them implying that they were cursed in some way.^{Ep. 7} In the anime, Arthur Gaz is revealed to have let the Eight Heroes kill him and take his remains so that the magic he created, "Chaika", could revive him. "Chaika" is the general term for a revival magic he created, with each Chaika being programmed to hunt down the remains for different reasons, eat them and effect his revival. The memories of the Chaika clones come from a girl who was taken in by Arthur Gaz, but he claims to not be able to remember her name, though he notes that she resembled Chaika Trabant more than any of the other Chaikas. His plan came to fruition when Black Chaika resurrected him. His teenaged self was the basis for Guy. He is named after GAZ, a Russian automotive manufacturer.
Guy (ギイ, Gii)
Voiced by: Ayumu Murase^{Ep. 1 credits} (Japanese); Kalin Coates (English)
A mysterious young man who gives Chaika Trabant information on the whereabouts of Arthur's remains. He has short pink hair and blue eyes.^{Ep. 3} He appears as a hologram and helps Chaika and her companions, yet his goals and ambitions are ambiguous as he also helps their adversaries and all Chaikas in their search for the remains.^{Ep. 11-12, S2 ep. 1-2} Toru suspects that he had the Red and White Chaikas converge on the island with the intent that one would destroy the other and take all of the remains but the Head and Torso as well as the "emperor's fortune", Niva Lada. Guy also saved Albéric Gillette by mind controlling the soldiers to dogpile atop of him and so protecting him from the blast that should have killed him in the season 1 finale.
In fact "he" is a multiple hive-minded magical mechanism designed with the purpose of making sure that the remains and Niva Lada make their way to Black Chaika so that she can resurrect their "father", king Arthur Gaz. He is imaged after Arthur Gaz's youthful self roughly in his teenaged years.
Jasmine Orlo (ハスミン・ウーロ, Hasumin Wuro)
Voiced by: Akane Kohinata (Japanese); Amanda L. Baird (English)
A traveling merchant who associated with the Saboteurs of Acura Village. Toru and Akari knew her when they were younger and saw her as a big sister. Jasmine taught Toru to see himself not as a weapon of war but rather as a human who could help make the world better. One night, Jasmine and her caravan, including her parents and husband, were attacked by bandits. A young Toru tried to rescue Jasmine and her newborn baby but he was too late and he found them dying from their wounds. To avenge her death, the villagers of Acura hunted Jasmine's killers then hanged them and desecrated their corpses. Jasmine's teachings and death deeply affected Toru.^{Ep. 9}

== Media ==
=== Light novels ===
No.	Release date	ISBN
1	December 18, 2010	978-4-04-071051-8
2	May 20, 2011	978-4-04-071052-5
3	October 20, 2011	978-4-04-071053-2
4	March 17, 2012	978-4-04-071054-9
5	August 17, 2012	978-4-04-071055-6
6	January 19, 2013	978-4-04-071056-3
7	July 20, 2013	978-4-04-071057-0
8	January 18, 2014	978-4-04-070007-6
9	April 19, 2014	978-4-04-070090-8
10	September 20, 2014	978-4-04-070145-5
11	December 20, 2014	978-4-04-070148-6
12	March 10, 2015 (LE); March 20, 2015	978-4-04-070171-4 (LE); 978-4-04-070150-9

=== Manga ===
Shinta Sakayama launched a manga adaptation of the light novels in Kadokawa Shoten's Monthly Shōnen Ace magazine in 2011, and the series ran until December 2014. The series was licensed in English by Yen Press.

Two other manga have also been published: a four-panel manga Hitsugi no Chaikakka, by Kanikama in Kadokawa Shoten's 4-Koma Nano Ace magazine in 2011–2013 and then in Monthly Shōnen Ace in 2014, and Gakuen Chaika! by Seri Minase that ran in Kadokawa's Age Premium magazine in 2014.

==== Volumes ====
No.	Original release date	Original ISBN	English release date	English ISBN
1	March 17, 2012	978-4-04-120208-1	June 23, 2015	978-0316342070
Episode 1: "The Girl Toting a Coffin"; Episode 2: "Forgotten Memories"; Episode 3: "The Ties That Bind"; Episode 4: "Chaika's Request"; Episode 0: "The Beginning of the End"
2	August 21, 2012	978-4-04-120337-8	September 22, 2015	978-0316263788
Episode 5: "Proof of Being Alive, Proof of Having Lived"; Episode 6: "Uninvited Guest of Honor"; Episode 7: "Chance Encounter with the Past"; Episode 8: "The Hero's Gundo"; Episode 9: "Rejection and..."; Episode 10: "Justice for Whom"
3	May 22, 2013	978-4-04-120633-1	December 15, 2015	978-0316263795
Episode 11: "The Emperor's Remains"; Episode 12: "Connected Lives"; Episode 13: "The Devastation of Bygone Wars"; Episode 14: "Dominica"; Episode 15: "Immediate Concerns"; Episode 16: "Collaborator"; Episode 17: "An Unshakeable Feeling of Dissonance"
4	March 26, 2014	978-4-04-121061-1	March 22, 2016	978-0316263801
Episode 18: "The Dragoon Cavalier"; Episode 19: "Two-headed Dogs"; Episode 20: "Dominica"; Episode 21: "A Dragoon Cavalier Stands Aloof"; Episode 22: "Lucie"; Episode 23: "Banquet of Disaccord"; Episode 24: "Remembering the Lost"; Special: "Chaika Academy"
5	December 26, 2014	978-4-04-102461-4	September 27, 2016	978-0316272346
Episode 25: "Dominica's Heart"; Episode 26: "The Dreaded Dragon Cavalier"; Episode 27: "Dominica's Joy"; Episode 28: "Her Dying Wish Remains"; Episode 29: "The Battle Ends"; Episode 30: "A Reason to Live "; Last Episode: "A Wish to Believe In"

=== Anime ===
A two-season anime adaptation was produced by Bones. The first season aired in Japan from April 9, 2014, to June 25, 2014. For the first season, the opening theme song was "Darakena" ("Laden") by Iori Nomizu and the ending theme song was "Kairaku Genri" (快楽原理, "Pleasure Principle") by Coffin Princess, consisting of Chika Anzai, Saeko Zōgō, and Yui Makino.

The second season titled Chaika The Coffin Princess: Avenging Battle aired from October 8, 2014, to December 10, 2014. For the second season, the opening theme song was "Shikkoku o Nuritsubuse" (漆黒を塗りつぶせ, "Paint It Jet-Black") by Iori Nomizu and the ending theme song was "Watashi wa Omae no Naka ni Iru" (ワタシハオマエノナカニイル, "I Exist Within You") by Coffin Princess, consisting of Chika Anzai, Saeko Zōgō, and Iori Nomizu.

An OVA was bundled with the limited edition of the twelfth and final volume of the original novels, released on March 1, 2015.

The series was simulcast on Crunchyroll and licensed for home video release by Sentai Filmworks. Crunchyroll simulcast the second season in May 2016 and it was later picked up by Sentai.

==== Chaika The Coffin Princess ====
No.	Title (Note: All English titles are taken from Crunchyroll.)	Original release date
1	"The Girl who Bears the Coffin"; Transliteration: "Hitsugi Katsugu Shōjo" (Japanese: 棺かつぐ少女)	April 9, 2014
While foraging for food in the forest, an unemployed saboteur, Toru Acura, encounters Chaika Trabant, a young white-haired wizard who is carrying a coffin. Their encounter is interrupted by the appearance of a man-eating unicorn. As Toru and Chaika flee they come up with a plan: Toru will delay the beast to allow Chaika the time she needs to cast her spell using her magic Gundo sniper rifle. As gratitude, Chaika buys Toru a meal, only for Toru's sister, Akari, to show up and accuse him of slacking off. Meanwhile, Albéric Gillette and his men from the Gillette Corps meet with Roberto Abarth, a war hero who fought against the Gaz Empire five years previously, and ask Abarth for the item he acquired from the war but they are refused. Meanwhile, Chaika hires the Acura siblings to steal an item from Abarth's mansion. That night, Toru, Akari and Chaika sneak into Abarth's mansion but encounter Abarth himself, who mistakes them for thieves hired by Albéric to steal his item. As he's about to use his magic to eliminate them, Abarth is shocked when he recognizes Chaika.
2	"The Lazy Man's Choice"; Transliteration: "Namakemono no Sentaku" (Japanese: 怠け者の選択)	April 16, 2014
Abarth is shocked to see Chaika as he believed her to be dead. After escaping him, Chaika explains that Abarth's mansion is his Gundo which allows him manipulate any object within the mansion and the only way to stop it is to destroy its magic source. Toru distracts Abarth as Chaika and Akari search for the source. Eventually they find the item that Chaika is looking for, a severed left hand in a glass jar. As they leave the mansion, the trio are attacked by the Gillette Corps who demand that they hand over Chaika and the magical hand. Akari drags Chaika to safety while Toru, carrying the glass jar, leads the Corps in a chase around the city before fighting one of their members, Nikolay Autotor. Toru is soon cornered by Albéric, Vivi Holopainen and the Corps magic vehicle. Albéric reveals to him that Chaika is actually Chaika Gaz, the daughter of the dreaded Emperor, Arthur Gaz of the Gaz Empire, whose death at the hands of the Eight Heroes ended the war. Albéric and his organization fear that if knowledge of Chaika's existence were to spread, Gaz loyalists would attempt to reform the Gaz Empire with her as a figurehead, which would reignite the war. The emperor's remains are also powerful sources of magic power. Toru is unmoved by these arguments and Chaika uses her magic to allow him to escape. Once they are safe, she reveals that she is gathering her father's remains so he can be given a proper burial. Toru and Akari decide to help Chaika in her quest for which she is thankful.
3	"The Forest Where the Hero Lives"; Transliteration: "Eiyū no Sumu Mori" (Japanese: 英雄の棲む森)	April 23, 2014
The trio search for another of the Eight Heroes who has a part of Arthur's remains in the town of Ipsom. Unfortunately, Chaika's coffin is drawing unwanted attention, so Toru wraps it in cloth. Meanwhile, the Gillette Corps receives word from their superiors, the post-war Kleeman Agency, that reinforcements are unavailable. As they have lunch, Chaika and the others learn that the ruler of Ipsom, Dominica Skoda, a dragoon cavalier and one of the Eight Heroes, lives nearby in a dangerous forest. The Gillette Corps arrive in town and are hot on the trail of Toru, Akari and Chaika when Guy, a young man who appears as a hologram and is Chaika's informant, informs them of where Dominica lives and where they can find an abandoned magical vehicle as transport. Having fixed up one of the abandoned vehicles, Chaika reveals that she was out of the country when her father was killed and doesn't have memories of the war. The trio is soon attacked by Orthrus but is saved by a female knight.
4	"The Dragoon's Wish"; Transliteration: "Doragūn no Negai" (Japanese: ドラグーンの願い)	April 30, 2014
The female knight introduces herself as Dominica Skoda and allows the trio to stay in her mansion. Toru suggests that they ask Dominica to hand over Arthur's remains peacefully before using force if that fails, but Chaika is reluctant since Dominica saved their lives and has been kind to them. The next day, Toru asks Dominica for Arthur's remains. To their surprise, she agrees to hand them over if they can defeat her. As they prepare, the group realizes that there is something strange about Dominica since she didn't recognize Chaika, despite being one of the Eight Heroes. During their match, Toru and Akari fight Dominica in their Iron-Blood Transformation forms but are unable to overcome her. However, Toru realizes that the Dominica they are fighting is not human but rather her Dragoon taking her master's form and forces the dragon to reveal its true form. Using their skills together, Toru, Akari and Chaika are able to defeat the Dragoon. The Dragoon then reveals that Dominica died shortly after the war ended but due to their close bond, she was unable to forget her master. As promised, the Dragoon gives them Arthur's eyes and decides to follow Toru, Akari and Chaika on their journey in the form of a young girl by the name of Fredrika.
5	"The Pursuer and the Pursued"; Transliteration: "Ou Mono Owareru Mono" (Japanese: 追う者追われる者)	May 7, 2014
Heading to the town of Perimeral, Toru, Akari and Chaika are ambushed by a red armored sword fighter and her two companions. Toru captures the warrior and is shocked to discover that she looks like Chaika but with shorter hair. Chaika Trabant is taken captive by Red Chaika's companions and both groups are forced to flee when the Gillette Corps arrives. After bribing her with food, Red Chaika reveals her name to be Chaika Bohdan, and also claims to be Emperor Arthur's daughter. She also wants to gather her father's remains but, unlike their Chaika, Red Chaika wants to use the power of their father's remains to take revenge against the Eight Heroes and the subjects who abandoned their father during the war. Meanwhile, Red Chaika's companions reveal to Chaika that there are other girls named Chaika who are also claiming to be Emperor Arthur's daughter. Elsewhere, the wizard Mattheus Callaway and Catboy Leonardo Stola try to track Toru and Akari but instead find Red Chaika's companions. Eventually, the two groups agree to a prisoner exchange and the two Chaikas meet each other face to face.
6	"Red and White"; Transliteration: "Aka to Shiro to" (Japanese: 赤と白と)	May 14, 2014
Cockatrices controlled by Mattheus attack the prisoner exchange, forcing David and Selma Kenworth to escape with Chaika while Toru, Akari and Red Chaika fight. Returning to their vehicle with Red Chaika, where Fredrika is waiting for them, Toru and Akari plan their next meeting. Meanwhile, the Gillette Corps are ordered by the Council of Six Nations to deal with farm riots much to Gillett's frustration. As Toru and Fredrika wait for Akari to return from arranging the next exchange, Red Chaika asks Toru why he is helping White Chaika, and offers him a place in her group. Both groups meet in Perimeral where they exchange hostages and Toru declines Red Chaika's offer. As they leave town, Chaika wonders if she really is Chaika Gaz but Toru doesn't care as what matters is that she's real. Red Chaika and David reappear and suggest that they join forces so that they can find Arthur's remains quicker. But, when Red Chaika reveals there can only be one Chaika Gaz, implying that she wants to kill White Chaika, Toru and Akari fight, forcing them to flee. As they continue, Toru is concerned that they will now have to deal with both the Gillette Corps and the other Chaikas as well.
7	"The Valley of No Return"; Transliteration: "Kaerazu no Tani" (Japanese: 還らずの谷)	May 21, 2014
Guy informs Toru and his group that the Hero, Simon Scania, was last seen at The Valley of No Return four years previously. However, before they can move on the information, they are ambushed by the Gillette Corps and escape using Fredrika's Dragoon form. Arriving at the valley, they notice it is filled with magic fog. When Chaika starts climbing down the valley wall, the others follow. Unexpectedly, the rock gives way beneath them and they fall into the fog. Akari, Chaika and Frederika, safe in a protective barrier, watch as Toru reacts to an illusion: Frederika was only able to find and catch Chaika and Akari in the fog, thus leaving Toru to suffer from the magic. They wait and eventually Toru stumbles into their barrier, freeing him from the influence of the magic. Reunited, the group makes their way along the valley floor where they find and destroy the machine that is creating the magic fog. With the fog cleared, the group finds Simon, now mad and delusional. Simon reveals that he created the fog machine to force people encountering the fog to experience the betrayal he felt when his wife and best friend betrayed him. After getting Arthur's leg from the machine, the group leaves Simon in peace.
8	"Empire of Consolation"; Transliteration: "Nagusame no Teikoku" (Japanese: 慰めの帝国)	May 28, 2014
The head of the Kleeman Agency, Konrad Steinmeitz, ask Albéric to take a break from searching for Chaika Trabant. Albéric decides to research the Emperor Arthur, but the lack of reliable evidence has increased his suspicions about his mission. Elsewhere, Toru and his companions encounter a group who calls themselves the "Neo Gaz Empire', who aim to bring back the Gaz Empire under a blonde haired girl whom they call "Princess Chaika". While Chaika befriends the princess, Toru, Akari and Fredrika have suspicions about the group. That night the princess goes out to rob a nearby mansion but is caught in an ambush. Toru's suspicions are confirmed when they are attacked by Neo Gaz's men. Toru and the girls easily overpower the group who admit that they are actually former Gaz Empire citizens who turned to thievery after being abandoned by the Six Nations. While Toru wants to leave, Chaika begs him to save the fake Princess Chaika, whose real name is Julia. Toru and comrades rescue Julia, for which she and her companions are grateful. Toru is disappointed that even though they were citizens of Gaz, these people know next to nothing about their emperor. Meanwhile, the Council of Six Nations decides to deal with a rebellion by Duke Gillard Gavarni who controls a floating fortress.
9	"The Value of Memories"; Transliteration: "Kioku no Neuchi" (Japanese: 記憶の値うち)	June 4, 2014
Running low on magic fuel for their magic vehicle, Toru's group try to resupply, but find that the local shops have run out due to the people celebrating the Anniversary of the End of the War against the Gaz Empire. Despite Chaika offering to use her memories as a substitute magic fuel, Toru refuses after learning Chaika loses her memories after using them. Meanwhile, the Gillette Corps celebrate the Anniversary in their own way before being summoned for an emergency mission. While Toru's group searches for any shop still selling magic fuel, Toru tells Chaika about his childhood. Toru reveals he and Akari grew up in village called Acura where the people trained to become Saboteurs. Despite his eagerness to join the Gaz Empire War, his mentor Shin tells Toru he is reckless. Toru also tells of Jasmine, a woman who was part of a convoy of traveling merchants who traded with the Acura villagers, whom Toru regarded as a big sister figure. However, one night, the convoy was attacked by bandits who killed the merchants. Despite his efforts, Toru was only able to find a dying Jasmine, who comforted the boy in her last moments. Even though the villagers killed the bandits responsible, Jasmine's death deeply affected Toru, and shaped the man he is now. He tells Chaika to never forget her memories, both good and bad. Finally they find a shop that still has magic fuel to sell. Toru and Chaika learn from the shopkeeper that Duke Gavarni of Iveco has acquired one of Arthur's remains from one of the Eight Heroes and decide to head there.
10	"Fortress in the Sky"; Transliteration: "Ten Tadashi ku Yōsai" (Japanese: 天征く要塞)	June 11, 2014
Arriving at Iveco, Toru realizes that something is strange about town: there are no young girls. There is also an uprising lack of magic fuel given that this region is famous for its mines of magic fuel. They learn from a shopkeeper that Duke Gavarni has been using all of the town's magic fuel to power the floating fortress Soara and that his soldiers are kidnapping the town's girls and taking them to his fortress where they are never seen again. Toru's group sneaks into Soara by having Akari disguise herself as a girl from town. She is taken aboard the Soara and helps Toru, Chaika and Fredrika get in, unaware that Vivi and Zuita have sneaked in as well. Meanwhile, the Council decides to take action against Duke Gavarni by launching their own floating fortress, Stratus. Konrad warns Albéric to get Vivi and Zuita out before the Council forces destroy the Soara. Toru's group tries to find the Soara's magic engine only to be ambushed by the Duke's soldiers. Toru and Chaika escape, Fredrika is impaled and Akari is captured. Akari is brought before the wizard, Grad Lancia, and Ricardo, the Duke's youngest son, who reveals that he killed his father and family himself. Grad uses a mind control spell on Akari to force her to find and fight the others. Toru and Chaika encounter a girl named Layla whose asks for their help in rescuing the women captured by the Duke's men but leads them into a trap. She kidnaps Chaika while Toru faces off against a mind-controlled Akari.
11	"The False Princess"; Transliteration: "Itsuwari no Himegami" (Japanese: 偽りの姫君)	June 18, 2014
Vivi and Zuita rescue Toru and the three of them agree to work together to find the others and escape the Soara. Elsewhere, Layla leads Chaika to a room where she reveals that she knows who Chaika is. As they search the fortress, Toru, Vivi and Zuita learn the horrible truth of what happened to the girls captured by the Duke's men: they were all tortured by Ricardo (to sate his sadistic tendencies), and Grad is using their painful memories as magic fuel for the Soara. Meanwhile, Layla reveals that she too is a Chaika (Blue Chaika) and tells Chaika Trabant the terrible truth that neither she or any of the other Chaikas are the real Chaika Gaz. The Chaikas were created and implanted with false memories of being Arthur's daughter. Each girl was given a different personality and skills, and above all, the overriding need to gather Arthur's remains. Chaika refuses to believe Layla, who then says that after she learned the truth, she chose to follow her own path and has aided Ricardo in restarting a war to avenge herself against those who would have used her. Fredrika arrives to rescue Chaika only to be killed by one of Grad's abominations. Elsewhere, Albéric tries to convince the captain of the Council Forces to delay his attack so that his comrades can escape but when he refuses to do so, Albéric threatens his life. Cornered by a mind-controlled Akari and the Duke's men, Vivi and Zuita try to hold them off while Toru goes to rescue Chaika.
12	"Those Left Behind"; Transliteration: "Nokosareshi Mono" (Japanese: 遺されしもの)	June 25, 2014
The commander of the Stratus is unfazed by Albéric's pleas for time and orders the Stratus to fire on the Soara. As the Soara and Stratus fire at each other, Zuita is able to free Akari from Grad's mind control. The continued battle between the sky fortresses has severely damaged the Stratus and caused the Soara's cannon to misfire, with Albéric and the unfortunate ground forces of the Alliance caught in the misaimed blast. The only trace of Albéric that Leonardo is able to find is his sword. Despite the revelations of her true origins, Chaika resolves to continue her quest to gather's Arthur's remains. Unable to aim Soara's cannon, Layla suggests to Ricardo that they crash the Soara into Cadwell, the capital of the Wiemac kingdom. This plan is thwarted by the Stratus which rams the Soara, sending both of the fortresses into the lake below. On their way to rejoin Toru, Akari, Vivi and Zuita discover that Fredrika, having created a second body, is still alive. They split up to search and Akari heads to the bridge where she kills Grad, ending his control of his minions. Chaika, wandering the fortress in search of her companions, stumbles upon Layla and Ricardo and is about to suffer the same fate as the girls from the town when an injured Toru rescues Chaika, and they flee after retrieving Arthur's left leg. Layla, angered that Chaika has decided to continue her quest despite learning the truth, shoots Toru with a crossbow. She is about to shoot Chaika but is distracted by Guy, allowing Chaika to shoot her with her Gundo sniper rifle. Chaika rescues Toru from drowning, and with the help of Fredrika in her dragoon form, she, Toru, Akari, Vivi and Zuita escape the Soara before it sinks to the bottom. Layla, seriously injured, makes her way to a dying Ricardo so that they can die together. On rejoining their companions, Vivi and Zuita learn of Albéric's death. Vivi screams in grief and her hair and eyes turn white and purple, respectively. Back at their vehicle, Chaika reveals her true origins to Toru, Akari and Fredrika as well as her determination to continue her quest. The others agree to help her and they drive off to their next destination.

==== Chaika The Coffin Princess: Avenging Battle ====
No.	Title	Original release date
1	"The Princess Who Gathers the Remains"; Transliteration: "Itai Atsumeru Kōjo" (Japanese: 遺体あつめる皇女)	October 8, 2014
During the last days of the war, Emperor Arthur Gaz orders one of his official to be in charge of a secret project codenamed Chaika. A month after the events of the Soara, Toru, Akari, Chaika duels with Lady Claudia Dodge, another of the Eight Heroes and her men but Chaika loses to Claudia. Despite this, Claudia allows Chaika and her companions to stay at her estate. Toru and the others learn after the war, Claudia hired out of work soldiers to her vineyard and despite being one of the Heroes, she is willing to give Arthur's heart to Chaika if she and her companions beat her in a duel tomorrow. Taking Claudia's advice, Chaika tries to learn to shorten her incantations in order to fire her spells faster. Meanwhile, with the Council now taking the Chaika threat more seriously, Konrad orders the Gillette Corps to continue their mission with Nikolai promoted as Captain of the Corps after Albéric's death. Elsewhere, Vivi is confronted by Guy and refuses to believe him when he tells her she is another Chaika albeit one that did not transform completely. Despite being a half-Chaika, Guy believes Vivi can still help in gathering Arthur's remains. The next day, despite being unable to learn short incantations, Chaika insist on beating Claudia fair and square as she, Toru and Akari battle Claudia in their duel.
2	"A Wizard's Pride"; Transliteration: "Uizādo no kyōji" (Japanese: ウイザードの矜持)	October 15, 2014
As Chaika, Toru and Akari try to find a way to beat Claudia, elsewhere, Red Chaika and her group defeats another Hero, Glen Donkervoort, acquiring Arthur's right arm and heading towards an island as suggested by their informant Guy. Eventually, Chaika manages to shorten her spell and defeat Claudia after the latter is distracted by Fredrika in her cat form. Claudia congratulates the group by hosting a tea party to celebrate. Meanwhile, Konrad's secretary Karen Bombardier gives Vivi Albéric's investigation notes on Emperor Arthur before rejoining the Corps with Albéric's sword in hand. Back at Claudia's estate, she reveals to Toru's group why she has no interest with Arthur's remains and gave hers to Chaika and tells her secret. During the end of the war, the Eight Heroes learn one of Arthur's officials escape with Arthur's hidden fortune and most of his magic research work to a secret island, and despite the Council attempts, they could not find the island or Arthur's magic research. After giving Toru's group the location of the other Heroes, Claudia bids them farewell. Soon Toru's group learns Red Chaika has already claim one of Arthur's remains from Glen while Chaika wants to find the secret island to learn about her origins.
3	"The Harbor of Phantom Dreams Recollected"; Transliteration: "Meimu oboeshi minato" (Japanese: 迷夢覚えし港)	October 22, 2014
Arriving at a seaside town ruled by Clay Morgan of the Eight Heroes, Toru and group disguise themselves as a comedy troupe to enter Clay's mansion. When Clay learns the groups attentions and sees Chaika, he runs away screaming while Toru and Akari chases him. Chaika tries to find clues of where the secret island is which she finds a lead at the Evil Sea. Toru and Akari find and defeat Clay, learning he's been scared of Emperor Arthur after fighting him and Chaika since she was beheaded by the leader of the Eight Heroes, King Stephan Hartgen, so he gives up Arthur's ears so he won't have to see Chaika or the remains again. After acquiring Arthur's ears, Guy appears and tells Toru and Akari to head to the secret island but both of them are now wary since Guy knew about the other Chaikas. Meanwhile, Shin informs his master Stephan that all of Arthur's remains will soon be arriving which Stephan promises his daughters Irina and Alina they will get to see it. Meanwhile, Toru and Chaika have an argument as the latter wants to find the secret island which the former refuses believing it's too dangerous which leads her to firing Toru. After Akari convinces Toru to make amends with Chaika, they learn too late that Chaika has left to find the island with Fredrika. Both of them chase after her on Clay's ship where Red Chaika and her group have sneaked in but the ship is sunken by a Kraken. Chaika and Fredrika finally found the secret island but are attack by Dragoons.
4	"The Writhing Island"; Transliteration: "Ugomeku shima" (Japanese: 蠢く島)	October 29, 2014
Chaika, Red Chaika and her companions manage to make it to the island safely only to be later captured by demihuman led by Kiril under orders from his master Viktor Izhmash. As Akari is reunited with Fredrika, an imprisoned Chaika befriends one of the demihumans named Ursula before she is rescued by Toru who manages to sneak into the island's facility. Toru and Chaika finds themselves in an underground lake filled with the bodies of dead Fayla and a dying intelligent Kraken. The Kraken reveals how magic was first used by Fayla before humans did until Arthur Gaz revolutionized the use of magic and Viktor was trying to mass produced clones of demihumans and Fayla. The Kraken also warns Chaika that her quest to gather Arthur's remains will lead to something terrible in the future. Soon, Kiril captures Chaika and Toru. Meanwhile, the Gillette Corps learns that floating fortresses were made much earlier by the Gaz Empire during the war. Toru, White Chaika and Red Chaika are brought to Viktor in lab with a mysterious blue haired girl in a capsule. Viktor reveals the awful truth to the Chaikas that there never was a Princess Chaika and all of the girls who claim and look like Chaika are actually young girls orphaned from the war who were brainwashed and given skills as part of Arthur's plan to gather his remains. While Red Chaika refuses to believe it, White Chaika, remembering what Layla told her before, falls into despair after finally accepting the truth as Viktor plans to dissect the girls for his experiments.
5	"The Emperor's Fortune"; Transliteration: "Kōtei no isan" (Japanese: 皇帝の遺産)	November 5, 2014
As the Chaikas are taken away, Viktor orders Kiril and Ursula to be killed, seeing no use for them now that he can mass produce clones of demihumans. Toru and both Chaikas escape their captors which both girls decide to join forces to escape the island and rescue the blue haired girl, Niva Lada. When White Chaika asks Red Chaika how she feels about the truth of their origins, the latter refuses to believe it as its up to her to decide whether its true or not. Elsewhere Akari and Fredrika rescues David, Selma, Kiril and Ursula where they agree to work together to escape the island and stop Viktor. Later, Toru rescues the Chaikas and Niva from Viktor's clone army and escape outside where they reunite with the others. As Viktor heads to a magical tower to mind control his clone army personally, Toru and the others fight their way to the tower so White Chaika can try destroy the tower. However, her gundo is not powerful enough to break the tower's shield. Niva decides to help Chaika, revealing she is in fact a human gundo when she turns into a giant gundo cannon which Chaika uses to destroy the tower, killing Viktor in the process. With the tower gone and no one to give them orders, the clones will soon die and Toru, Kiril and Red Chaika and their companions decide to leave from the island separately and peacefully. Meanwhile, the Council of Six nations are suspicious of Stephan Hartgen hosting a fighting tournament where the winner gets his remains of Arthur Gaz so they send the Gillette Corps to investigate.
6	"The Castle of Madness"; Transliteration: "Kyōki no shiro" (Japanese: 狂気の城)	November 12, 2014
As Toru and his companions head to the Principality of Hartgen to get the last of Arthur's remains, the Gillette Corps arrived at the Secret Island and learn from Kiril and Ursula what happened on the island before they arrive. At Hartgen, Red Chaika and her companions enter the tournament after defeating other contestants in the preliminary rounds. Toru and his companions also enter the tournament as well, in order to win Arthur's remains should they fail to steal it. Zita and Matthäus meet with King Stephan in order to convince him to cancel the tournament but to their shock, not only do they discover the King's daughters, Alina and Irina, are also Chaikas, but the King refuses to cancel the tournament. Meanwhile, Vivi and Nikolai enter the tournament as well where they are shock that the tournament allows the contestants to kill. Guy visits Albéric, whom latter is revealed to have lost his memories, that Guy rescued him because of the hatred in his heart. As most of the contestants rest for the night, Toru and Akari attempts to sneak in the King's castle to steal the remains while Chaika sees Niva leaving with Guy voluntarily.
7	"Black Agenda"; Transliteration: "Kuroi omowaku" (Japanese: 黒い思惑)	November 19, 2014
Toru and Akari attempt to infiltrate the castle in order to steal the remains but their mentor Shin appears, forcing them to escape. Meanwhile, Guy brings Niva to Stephan Hartgen, who is eager to start a new war, as he believes that warriors like him can be only worthy in combat. The next day, the tournament begins, and while facing other contestants, Toru and Chaika meet Vivi and Nikolai, but instead of fighting, they decide to share information instead, and learn about the twin Chaikas that are always beside Hartgen. Little they know that the twin Chaikas answer to a third one, who has her own agenda. As the Council of the Six Nations discuss if they should launch an attack on Hartgen, Konrad is informed about the situation there while the pairs composed of Chaika and Toru, Boghdan and David, Akari and Fredrika, and Vivi and Nikolai advance to the next stage of the tournament, oblivious to the fact that Stephan is aware of their presence and is making arrangements for them to fight each other.
8	"The Bells of Contention"; Transliteration: "Tōsō no kane" (Japanese: 闘争の鐘)	November 26, 2014
Chaika, Toru, Vivi and Nikolai continue into the tournament but are arrested by Hartgen guards supposedly for cheating and force into a tunnel. Akari and Fredrika sneak into the castle to steal the Stephan's remains only to encounter a group of Chaika warriors led by Shin and captured. Meanwhile, Zita, Leonardo and Mattheus rescues one of King Stephan's advisors who revealed how the King became depressed after the war ended until Black Chaika arrived and promises him to bring the war back. Chaika, Toru, Vivi and Nikolai arrived in an arena watched over by Alina, Irina and Black Chaika, who orders them to fight certain opponents. Vivi and Nikolai are forced to fight Albéric, who doesn't recognize his comrades. Vivi is forced to chop Albéric's right hand to stop from killing Nikolai. Thanks to the pain, Albéric regains his memories. Next, Chaika and Toru fight Red Chaika and David but after David gets seriously injured, Red Chaika admits defeat. Despite winning, Black Chaika demands Toru and Chaika the rest of Arthur's remains to her. After a severe beating by Shin and Chaika captured, Toru is told to bring the rest of the remains if he wants to see Chaika again.
9	"The Throne That Invites War"; Transliteration: "Ikusa maneku gyokuza" (Japanese: 戦まねく玉座)	December 3, 2014
As Toru, Akari and Fredrika are kicked out of the castle, Red Chaika decides to give her remains to Chaika's group only to learn from Selma that Hartgen's men attack and stole if from her. Zita and Leonardo reunite with Vivi and Nikolai and learns Albéric is alive. With Fredrika weaken by Shin's poison, Toru and Akari have no choice but to give the rest of the remains to save Chaika. After informing his superiors on what happened, The Gillette Squad are ordered to take down King Stephan before any of the Six Nations attack, which will reignite the war. Toru and Akari arrive in Stephan throne room where Stephan, Alina, Irina, Black Chaika, Niva, Guy, Shin and Chaika awaits them with Albéric sneaking in. With all of the remains gathered, Black Chaika "consumes" the remains and starts giving birth with Guy's help, who reveals he is a magic mechanism to ensure the remains would be gathered. Black Chaika gives birth to a boy resembling Guy but with Fayla bodyparts who reveals himself to be none other than Arthur Gaz himself. Arthur thanks Black Chaika for using Fayla parts in her to resurrect him and kills Stephan with a spell without an incantation much to everyone shock. As Arthur sits on the throne and grows older, he explains to Chaika the truth that she and her "sisters" were never really his real daughters as the Chaikas were based on his mistress who was killed by Stephan during the war which he uses as a basis for all of the Chaikas looks. Arthur reveals his goal was to gather large amounts of magic fuel using several flying fortresses hidden in space to collect from people's emotions with war bringing out the most of their emotions. So he allowed himself to be killed and his remains scattered while the Chaikas fought to get them so the dread and fear about him would spread throughout the continent. To demonstrate his power, Arthur and Niva easily destroys a flying fortress sent to attack Hartgen.
10	"The Girl Who Carries the Gundo"; Transliteration: "Gando ninau shōjo" (Japanese: 機杖担う少女)	December 10, 2014
After destroying several of the Six Nations flying fortresses, Arthur heads to one of his space fortress along with Shin to begin his plans. Toru decides to make a pact with Fredrika by becoming a Dragoon Cavalier in order to fight Arthur while Akari, Vivi, Leonardo, Red Chaika and her companions face off against Black Chaika and her minions. Assisted by Chaika and her Gundo sniper rifle to enter the space fortress, Toru battles against Shin before finally defeating him. Red Chaika faces off against Black Chaika before giving her the finishing blow, ending the latter controls of Alina, Irina, and the Chaika warriors. Finally facing Arthur, the Emperor beckons Toru to join his side since he believes war is what all of humanity wants but Toru refuses and he and Fredrika are swiftly beaten. Before Arthur can kill them, Chaika casts a shield to protect Toru and Fredrika. Arthur tries to kill Chaika using Niva but Niva refuses and joins Chaika's side. With no more magic bullets to use, Chaika uses her memories as magic fuel for Niva's Cannon Gundo form where they finally kill Arthur and stopping his plans before Chaika loses conscious. In the aftermath, Albéric, now the new chief of the Kleeman Agency, reports to the Council of Six Nations that Arthur's plans were thwarted, Niva is under their custody and claims all of the Chaikas died. Elsewhere, Toru, Akari, Chaika, Fredrika and Red Chaika now live together where Toru helps a recovering Chaika.
11 (OVA)	Transliteration: "Hitsugi no Chaika: Nerawareta Hitsugi/Yomigaeru Iseki" (Japanese: 棺姫のチャイカ ねらわれた棺 / 蘇る遺跡)	March 10, 2015
