= Sukimasuki =

Japanese manga series

- Tankōbon volume cover, featuring Fumio (top) and Heisaku (bottom)

スキマスキ
- Genre: Coming-of-age; Romantic comedy
- Manga
- Written by: Yumi Unita
- Published by: Shogakukan
- Imprint: Ikki Comix
- Magazine: Monthly Ikki
- Original run: November 30, 2001 – April 25, 2003
- Volumes: 1
- Live-action film
- Directed by: Kōta Yoshida
- Written by: Kōta Yoshida
- Music by: Akira Matsumoto; Yue Ichizuka
- Studio: Stairway
- Released: February 7, 2015
- Runtime: 82 minutes
- icon

Sukimasuki (スキマスキ; 'Peephole Love') is a Japanese manga series written and illustrated by Yumi Unita. It was serialized in Shogakukan's seinen manga magazine Monthly Ikki from November 2001 to April 2003, and its ten chapters were published in a single tankōbon volume in July 2003. A live-action film adaptation premiered in February 2015.

== Synopsis ==
Hisaku is a college student who enjoys peeking through cracks to see what is on the other side. One day, he realizes that he can see into Fumio's room, the girl who lives next door, through the curtains in his own room. However, he is unaware that she is also looking into his room through the curtains.

== Characters ==
Heisaku (ヘイサク)
Portrayed by: Keita Machida
A second-year college student enrolled in the evening division of the architecture program. He works during the day at the Tomato Transport Distribution Center. He lives with his parents and has a younger brother who recently started dating a new girlfriend. His hobby is peering into gaps—such as those between buildings or in stone walls—and his greatest pleasure lately has been peeking into Fumio's room in the neighboring apartment through the gap in the curtains hanging at his window.
Fumio (文緒)
Portrayed by: Kokone Sasaki
A second-year college student majoring in law at the same university as Heisaku. She lives in a 30-year-old apartment building next door to Heisaku's house. Fumio notices Heisaku through the gap in the curtains and watches his room, taking photos and observing. Although she is attractive, her personal life is a bit disorganized, and the curtains in her room are always slightly open. She also gets drunk easily and spends her time at home in her underwear.
Hana (華)
Portrayed by: Eriko Nakamura
A fourth-year college student and friend of Fumio's who attends the same university. She has black hair and almond-shaped eyes and dresses in a boyish style. She works part-time at Nakanishi Photo Studio, where she developed the candid photos of Heisaku that Fumio took. She is averse to men, finding them repulsive, and harbors romantic feelings for Fumio.
Masaji (マサジ)
Portrayed by: Masayasu Yagi
A second-year college student who attends the evening division of the same university as Heisaku, majoring in architecture. During the day, he works as a carpenter and usually wears work clothes rather than casual attire. He is tall and has a stern face that makes him seem unapproachable, but he is very considerate and well-liked by his neighbors in the apartment building where he lives; he also looks out for Heisaku.
Kinta (キンタ)
Portrayed by: Miyabi Matsunoi
A second-year college student who attends the evening division of the same university as Heisaku, majoring in architecture. He has black, mushroom-cut hair and always wears button-up shirts, ties, and Mod suits. He is short and has androgynous features. During the day, he works as a sales representative for health foods. He is in a relationship with Satomi, a glamorous woman.
Satomi (サトミ)
Kinta's girlfriend. She has a seductive figure and always wears low-cut tops. She is deeply in love with Kinta and has a kind side. She is strong enough to lift Kinta with both hands.

== Media ==
=== Manga ===
Written and illustrated by Yumi Unita, Sukimasuki was serialized in Shogakukan's seinen manga magazine Spirits Zōkan Ikki (re-branded as Monthly Ikki in 2003) from November 30, 2001, to April 25, 2003. Shogakukan collected its ten chapters in a single tankōbon volume, released on July 30, 2003.

=== Live-action film ===
A live-action film adaptation was announced in October 2014. The film was directed and scripted by Kōta Yoshida and produced by Stairway. The music was composed by Akira Matsumoto and Yue Ichizuka. It stars Exile's member Keita Machida as Heisaku and Kokone Sasaki as Fumio. The film premiered in Japanese theaters on February 7, 2015.

== Reception ==
Carlo Santos of Anime News Network observed that the manga balances realism with absurdity, and that although the characters adhere to familiar archetypes, they possess distinctive traits that make them memorable. He noted that the central relationship develops into a credible romance, and that the artwork, while simple, effectively conveys character expressiveness through varied line work and panel layouts. However, Santos criticized the frequent absence of backgrounds, which resulted in a barren visual atmosphere. He also identified narrative shortcomings, including superfluous dialogue among supporting characters that distracted from the plot, and a romantic trajectory lacking meaningful conflict or obstacles, with one rival character remaining underutilized. Despite a sluggish middle section and a general lack of dramatic tension, Santos concluded that "there's plenty to like about the lively characters, confident artwork, and a sweet romantic ending."

== See also ==
- Bunny Drop, another manga series by the same author
