= Kōta Yoshida =

Japanese film director

- Occupation: Film director

Kōta Yoshida (吉田浩太, Yoshida Kōta) is a Japanese film director.

== Filmography ==
- Coming With My Brother (2006)
- Yuriko's Aroma (2010)
- Ochiki (2012)
- Black Report (2012)
- Usotsuki Paradox (2013)
- Onna no Ana (2014)
- The Torture Club (2014)
- Sukimasuki (2015)
- Even Though I Don't Like It (2016)
- Love Disease (2017)
- Sexual Drive (2021)
- Snowdrop (2025)
- The Girl at the End of the Line (2026)
