= Hello, My Dolly Girlfriend =

- Poster
- Directed by: Takashi Ishii
- Produced by: Takashi Achiwa; Ujikatsu Omori
- Starring: Tasuku Emoto; Kokone Sasaki; Naoto Takenaka; Rumi Kazama; Rina Sakuragi; Yuki Mamiya
- Distributed by: Kadokawa Pictures
- Release date: 15 June 2013
- Running time: 112 minutes
- Country: Japan
- Language: Japanese

Hello, My Dolly Girlfriend (フィギュアなあなた, Figyua na anata; lit. 'You are a figure') is a 2013 Japanese erotic romance film directed by Takashi Ishii and starring Tasuku Emoto, Kokone Sasaki and Naoto Takenaka.

== Plot ==
The film starts off with an introverted office boy named Kentaro, who is scapegoated for the company's huge revenue loss and fired from his job. Adding insult to injury, his office crush disgraces him for his pitiful reputation when he tries to find solace in her. Filled with sorrow, Kentaro goes to a strip bar and mumbles complaints as he loses control of himself in a drunken state. One incident involves him almost hitting a stripper and getting himself kicked out.

As he continues his pitiful state, he picks a fight with a butch and her girlfriend for bumping into him and gets beaten up. Terrified, he pushes her into broken glass, thus making her bleed, and escapes to a nearby building on the 4th floor. Angry with Kentaro and showing off her machoism, the butch continues to pursue him despite her girlfriend's protest. There he discovers a mannequin in a sailor suit that looks and feels like a real human from the softness of her skin to the realistic pubic hair. Releasing all his repressed feelings, he begins to stage a rape scene with the doll. Unfortunately for him, he is then found by the butch and her girlfriend resulting in another beating. After that, the butch and her girlfriend get aroused and decide to go to another room to get intimate. As they proceed to fill their desires, they discover three thugs who are running away from the yakuza, hiding and observing them. A fight ensues and the butch is shot twice. Thinking she has died, two of the men decide to rape the butch's girlfriend in the room where Kentaro is in. Sensing danger, Kentaro hides under the bed to avoid any conflict and observes the whole ordeal. After a while, the butch re-emerges only to be shot again. The thugs' leader then says that he will release the girl without shooting her, only if she manages to get out of their sights within ten seconds. When the girl rushes to find her belongings, the girl discovers Kentaro under the bed and decides to reveal his presence as a way to distract the thugs and escape. This proves useless as she ends up getting shot at. Knowing his presence, they proceed to drag him out and attempt to kill him. Before they are able to do so, the mannequin that he "raped" comes to life, saving him and killing the thugs. Kentaro is shocked by the events, faints and falls asleep as his strength ebbs away.

The next morning Kentaro wakes up to find the mannequin in a new set of clothes beside him. Feeling confused, he looks around for the dead bodies that were killed only to realize he hallucinated or dreamt of it the whole night. Looking at his "heroine", he thanks her by bringing her back home. After a troublesome day reaching home, he decides to name her Kokone. As days pass, he begins to form a relationship with Kokone, complaining about his sorrows and talking about his everyday life. Due to his solitude and disappointment, he starts experiencing weird things about her. One minute she begins to talk and move her like a real human, another minute, she remains stationary like a doll. This confusion leads him to madness as he then begins to have a raping fantasy with the doll.

Unable to find a job due to his bad reputation, he desperately borrows money from loan sharks and gambles. As he begins to lose a lot of money, he attempts to commit suicide only for Kokone to save him. This instills him with a desire to come back victorious, which he does when he wins a mahjong game with the impossible nine gates. Overjoyed, he rushes back to share the good news of his winnings only to discover that Kokone has disappeared. He gets very disappointed. This however, is short-lived when he hears Kokone's voice singing on the rooftop. Curious, he goes up and finds her in a wedding dress playing a piano. This becomes a blatant fantasy as he then marries her and the previous dead characters (the three thugs, butch and her girlfriend) come back to life and embrace his happiness. All of this occurs on the building's rooftop. Just as they take a picture for his wedding, the flash brings him back to reality whereby, on his journey back home after his winnings, he remembers jay-walking the street only to stop when he saw a woman who looked exactly like Kokone.

Although he was shocked and frozen, he realizes an oncoming truck was going to hit them and he rushes to protect the woman from the impact. This results in a blank and showed Kentaro in his subconscious mind still struggling to find Kokone. When he arrives at his apartment, in Kokone's place there is a messed up mannequin with no hair and tears in her eyes, revealing the whole experience as a fantasy of Kentaro.

== Cast ==
- Tasuku Emoto
- Kokone Sasaki
- Naoto Takenaka
- Rumi Kazama
- Rina Sakuragi
- Yuki Mamiya
- Mitsu Dan

== Reception ==
It was chosen as the 8th best film at the 23rd Japan Film Professional Awards and was runner-up in Kinema Junpo's 2013 top 10 Japanese films.

In Screen Daily, Mark Adams called it an "often uncomfortably perverse and exploitative film".
