= Sexual Drive (film) =

2021 Japanese anthology film

- Film poster
- Directed by: Kōta Yoshida
- Written by: Kōta Yoshida
- Produced by: Tsuyoshi Goto
- Starring: Manami Hashimoto; Ryo Ikeda; Honami Satō; Mukau Nakamura; Shogen; Rina Takeda; Tateto Serizawa
- Cinematography: Masafumi Seki
- Music by: Akira Matsumoto
- Production company: Shaiker
- Distributed by: Shaiker (Japan); Film Movement (United States)
- Release dates: February 4, 2021 (IFFR); April 29, 2022 (Japan); April 22, 2022 (United States)
- Running time: 70 minutes
- Country: Japan
- Language: Japanese

Sexual Drive is a 2021 Japanese anthology film written and directed by Kōta Yoshida. The film is a black comedy triptych that explores human desire, sexuality, and psychological obsession through the recurring metaphor of food—specifically natto, mapo tofu, and ramen. It stars Manami Hashimoto, Ryo Ikeda, Honami Satō, Mukau Nakamura, Tateto Serizawa, Shogen and Rina Takeda.

The film had its world premiere in the Big Screen Competition at the 50th International Film Festival Rotterdam (IFFR) on 4 February 2021, and was theatrically released in Japan by Shaiker on 29 April 2022. In the United States it was released by Film Movement in virtual cinemas and on VOD on 22 April 2022.

Fortissimo Films handles worldwide sales of Sexual Drive, which screened at a number of international festivals including the Taipei Golden Horse Fantastic Film Festival, the Moscow International Film Festival, New Horizons International Film Festival, the Hong Kong Summer International Film Festival, the Fantasia International Film Festival, the Thessaloniki International Film Festival, Offscreen Film Festival in Brussels, Asian Film Festival Barcelona and the Seoul International Food Film Festival.

== Plot ==
The film is divided into three distinct segments, each named after a dish and centered around a specific sexual or psychological complex. All three episodes are linked by the recurring character Kurita, a shabby, unsettling man who confronts each protagonist with a secret that exposes their repressed desires.

Natto

Enatsu (Ryo Ikeda), a designer leading a sexless married life, is approached by a strange man named Kurita (Tateto Serizawa), who claims to be investigating an extramarital affair involving Enatsu's wife Megumi (Manami Hashimoto). Over the course of their conversation, Kurita vividly describes Megumi eating sticky natto, turning the act of eating into an erotic performance. As the details grow increasingly intimate, Enatsu's jealousy and frustration surface, and the image of natto becomes a catalyst for unearthing his suppressed desires and anxieties about his marriage.

Mapo Tofu

Akane (Honami Satō), an office worker suffering from depression and panic attacks, is trying to overcome a crippling fear of driving after a past incident. Kurita inserts himself into her life by recounting an episode in which she nearly ran him over with her car, using the incident to taunt and manipulate her. Through a charged sequence involving the preparation of intensely spicy mapo tofu for her husband (Mukau Nakamura), Akane's bottled-up rage and latent sadistic impulses are brought to the surface, shifting the power dynamic between her and the men around her.

Ramen

Ikeyama (Shogen), a married advertising executive, maintains an affair with his younger lover Momoko (Rina Takeda). Hoping to end the relationship, he cancels a planned meeting with her. Kurita then calls Ikeyama, claiming to have abducted Momoko and describing in graphic detail how aroused she was while eating an extraordinarily greasy "back-fat" ramen with extra garlic. As Ikeyama slurps through his own bowl of ramen while listening to Kurita's narration, feelings of guilt, lust and gluttony become intertwined, driving him back toward an encounter he had intended to avoid.

== Cast ==
- Tateto Serizawa as Kurita
- Ryo Ikeda as Enatsu
- Manami Hashimoto as Megumi
- Honami Satō as Akane
- Mukau Nakamura as Akane's husband
- Shogen as Ikeyama
- Rina Takeda as Momoko

== Production ==
Sexual Drive was produced by the independent Japanese company Shaiker, with Tsuyoshi Goto credited as producer. The film's cinematography was handled by Masafumi Seki, with an electronic score composed by Akira Matsumoto.

Critics have noted Sexual Drive as a continuation of Yoshida's interest in erotic and fetishistic subject matter, following earlier works such as The Torture Club (2014) and Love Disease (2018).

== Release ==
The film had its world premiere in the Big Screen Competition section of the 50th International Film Festival Rotterdam, where it was nominated for the VPRO Big Screen Award. After Rotterdam, Sexual Drive travelled on the festival circuit, screening at the Taipei Golden Horse Fantastic Film Festival (Asian premiere), the Moscow International Film Festival, New Horizons International Film Festival in Wrocław, the Hong Kong Summer International Film Festival, the Fantasia International Film Festival in Montreal, the Thessaloniki International Film Festival, Offscreen Film Festival in Brussels, Asian Film Festival Barcelona and the Seoul International Food Film Festival, among others.

In Japan, the film was released by Shaiker on 29 April 2022, opening at Shinjuku Musashinokan in Tokyo before expanding to other theatres.

Film Movement acquired North American rights and released Sexual Drive in the United States on 22 April 2022 in virtual cinemas and on VOD platforms. The film has also been made available on curated streaming services such as MUBI in some territories.

== Reception ==
Sexual Drive received generally positive reviews from critics. On Metacritic, the film has a weighted average score of 66 out of 100, based on 4 critic reviews, indicating "generally favorable reviews."

David Ehrlich of IndieWire gave the film a B−, writing that "Yoshida's giddy fetishism makes for its own simple fun. For all of his movie's empty calories, there's still an aftertaste of truth to the idea that holds its predictably heteronormative trio of stories together." Natalia Winkelman of The New York Times found the film "consistently intriguing and occasionally hilarious," noting that "the movie does not depict sex itself. Instead, the characters eat food items that become objects of titillation, lust and pleasure: the sticky goo around soybeans, chili oil sizzling in a wok."

Dennis Harvey of 48 Hills wrote that "this peculiar exercise in the humor of mortification may make you squirm, but it will almost certainly also make you laugh." Rich Cline of Shadows on the Wall gave it 4 out of 5 stars, praising its "bonkers sensibility," calling the film "bright and often wickedly funny, cleverly exploring the shifting power of attraction." Panos Kotzathanasis of Asian Movie Pulse described it as "a very entertaining triptych that thrives on the ingenious ways Yoshida Kota uses to present the connection between food and sex."
