= Onna no Ana =

Japanese manga

女の穴
- Manga
- Written by: Fumiko Fumi
- Published by: Tokuma Shoten
- Imprint: Ryu Comics
- Published: September 13, 2011
- Volumes: 1
- Live-action film
- Directed by: Kōta Yoshida
- Released: June 28, 2014
- Runtime: 95 minutes

Onna no Ana (女の穴; lit. "Woman's Hole") is a Japanese manga written and illustrated by Fumiko Fumi and published by Tokuma Shoten on the Ryu Comics imprint on September 13, 2011. It was adapted into a live action youth erotic science fiction film directed by Kōta Yoshida and release on June 28, 2014.

== Plot ==
An alien female comes to the Earth, dressed as a schoolgirl, under the name of Suzuki-san, to get pregnant. She gets a boyfriend, but somehow gets pregnant from a teacher. Once she gives birth to a baby, she says goodbye to the teacher and to the boyfriend, and is pulled to the saucer, by which she flies back to her planet.

== Cast ==
- Naoho Ichihashi
- Yumi Ishikawa
- Yūkichi Kobayashi
- Noriyuki Fuse
