= Manami Hashimoto =

Japanese actress and gravure model (born 1984)

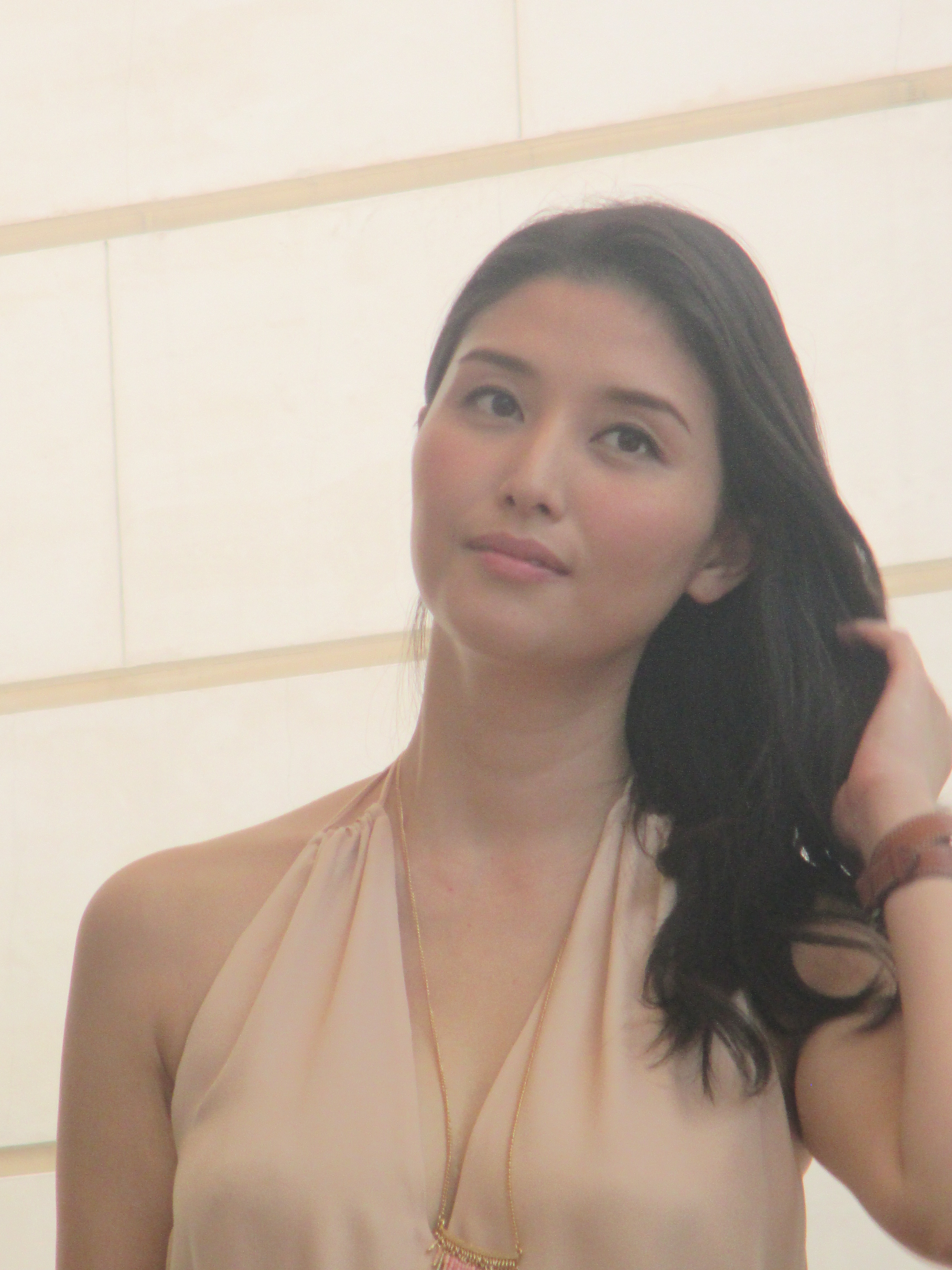
- Hashimoto in April 2016
- Born: Manami Hosokawa; August 8, 1984 (age 42); Yamagata, Yamagata, Japan
- Education: Yamagata-Jōhoku High School; Horikoshi High School
- Occupations: Gravure model; actress
- Years active: 1997–present
- Agents: Irving; Harmony Promotion (business alliance)
- Height: 1.68 m (5 ft 6 in) (2015)
- Spouse: Undisclosed (m. 2019)
- Children: 2

Japanese name
- Kanji: 橋本 マナミ
- Hiragana: はしもと まなみ
Transcriptions
- Romanization: Hashimoto Manami

Manami Hosokawa (細川 愛実, Hosokawa Manami; born August 8, 1984), better known by her stagename Manami Hashimoto (橋本 マナミ, Hashimoto Manami), is a Japanese gravure model and actress represented by Irving and her business alliance is Harmony Promotion.

Hashimoto is called by such unique catchphrases such as "Heisei no Danchi Tsuma," (The Apartment Complex Wife of the Heisei era), "Aijin ni Shitai Onna No. 1," (The Number-one Woman I Want as My Mistress), and "Kokumin no Aijin." (The Nation's Mistress) That is to say, she was one of the sex symbols in Japan during the 2010s.

== Personal life ==
On November 27, 2019, Hashimoto announced on her official blog that she has married a non-celebrity man, a physician, one year her junior.

On July 2, 2022, she gave birth to their first child, a son. On March 31, 2024, Hashimoto announced her second pregnancy on Instagram. On July 8, she announced the birth of her second child, a daughter.

== Filmography ==
=== Television series ===
Year	Title	Role	Notes	Ref.
2003	Musashi	Senhime	Taiga drama	
2006	Shimokita Glory Days	Mao Uehara		
2007	Boys Esté	Akagi Suzuka		
2007	Swan's Fool!:Love with a 30,000 Yen Allowance	Tomoko Kawai		
2009	The Emperor	Mai		
2013	Tokyo Toy Box	Shinako Kubouchi		
2015	All Esper Dayo!	Haruka		
2015	Mare	Kanae	Asadora	
2015	Save Our Town!	Chiaki Koda		
2015	Watashi no Aooni	Midori		
2015	Women in Distress	Reiko Toyama		
2016	Sanada Maru	Hosokawa Gracia	Taiga drama	
2016	Doctor-X: Surgeon Michiko Daimon	Harumi Kanazawa	Guest	
2016	I Love You so Much	Haruka Ogawa		
2016	The Three Brothers 2	Megumi Suzuki		
2017	Golden Lord: Back to the Nagoya	Kyoko	Episode 2	
2017	Female Prisoner Seven	Chizuruka Yajima		
2017	Hello Harinezumi	Nanako Nakamura	Episode 7	
2018	Manpuku	Megumi Hoshina	Asadora	
2018	Life for Sale	Ruriko Kishi		
2018	The Grass Is Always Greener Next Door	Rumi Hasebe		
2018	Abacus Samurai Kaze no Ichibei	Sawa		
2018	Smoking	Minami Makino		
2019	Maison De Police	Hitomi Otsuki	Episode 3	
2019	Two Homelands	Mariko Oda		
2019	Immoral Late-Night Snack	Hitomi Konno		
2020	E-Ki-S-T-R-A!!!	Yuko Iiyama	Episode 2	
2020	Alibi Destruction	Junko Kawatani	Episode 3	
2020	Papa Fell in Love Again	Nana Katase	Episode 4	
2020	The Man Who Didn't Lose to America: The Foolish Prime Minister Yoshida Shigeru	Torio Tsuruyo		
2020	100-character Idea Turned Into a Drama!	Yoshie		
2020	The Chef is a Detective	Misato Uehara		
2020	Manga Artist Lenaga's Complex Society Super Definition	Yamane Mirai		
2025	The Laughing Salesman		Episode 12	

=== Films ===
Year	Title	Role	Notes	Ref.
2016	Ninkyō Yarō	Kaoru		
2016	Unrequited Love	Misato	Lead role; "Eve no Okurimono" segment	
2017	Hamon: Yakuza Boogie	Remi		
2017	And Then There Was Light	Namiko Kurokawa		
2019	Hell Girl	Hone Onna		
2019	Masquerade Hotel	Hiroko Morikawa		
2020	Iyashi no Kokoromi	Sayaka Itō		
2020	Etsunen: Lovers	Aoi	Lead role; Taiwanese-Japanese film	
2021	The Blue Danube	Haruko		
2021	The Fable: The Killer Who Doesn't Kill	Ai		
2022	Tears of Persephone	Yōko		
2022	Sexual Drive	Masumi	Lead role; "Nattō" segment	
2023	Sin Clock	Yuka		
2024	Don't Lose Your Head!	Takao Dayū		
2024	The Ohara Family Rhapsody	Misa		
