= The Torture Club =

- Cover of Volume 1

ちょっとかわいいアイアンメイデン (Chotto Kawaii Aian Meiden)
- Genre: Comedy, erotica, yuri
- Manga
- Written by: Makoto Fukami
- Published by: Kadokawa Shoten
- Magazine: 4-Koma Nano Ace (2011-2013); Young Ace (2014-2015)
- Original run: 2011 – 2015
- Volumes: 4

The Torture Club (ちょっとかわいいアイアンメイデン, Chotto Kawaii Aian Meiden; "A Little Cute Iron Maiden") is a Japanese 4-Koma comic strip written by Makoto Fukami and illustrated by Alpha AlfLayla. It was published by Kadokawa Shoten in 4-Koma Nano Ace from April 2011 until the final issue in October 2013, it was then transferred to Young Ace from December 2013 onwards.

The Torture Club
- Poster for the Live Action movie
- Directed by: Kota Yoshida
- Written by: Kota Yoshida; Makoto Fukami
- Based on: Chotto Kawaii Aian Meiden by Makoto Fukami
- Starring: Noriko Kijima
- Cinematography: Masafumi Seki
- Edited by: Masayuki Narumi
- Music by: Akira Matsumoto
- Production company: Kadokawa Daiei Studios
- Distributed by: Kadokawa Corporation
- Release date: July 19, 2014
- Running time: 107 minutes
- Country: Japan
- Language: Japanese

== Live Action ==
A live action film based on the comic was directed by Kota Yoshida. It was released on 19 July 2014.

== Cast ==
- Noriko Kijima as Yuzuki Mutoh
- Haruna Yoshizumi as Aoi Funaki
- Yuki Mamiya as Yuuri Kobashi
- Mika Yano as Maika Shinzaki
