= Yuriko's Aroma =

- Film poster
- Kanji: ユリ子のアロマ
- Revised Hepburn: Yuriko no Aroma
- Directed by: Kōta Yoshida
- Written by: Kōta Yoshida
- Produced by: Takashi Hirota
- Cinematography: Akitoshi Minami
- Music by: Masayoshi Tomura; Shoji Ikenaga
- Production company: Ace Deuce Entertainment
- Release dates: February 2010 (Yubari); May 8, 2010 (Japan)
- Running time: 73 minutes
- Country: Japan
- Language: Japanese

Yuriko's Aroma (Japanese: ユリ子のアロマ, Hepburn: Yuriko no Aroma) is a 2010 Japanese erotic comedy-drama film directed by Kōta Yoshida.

== Cast ==
- Noriko Eguchi as Yuriko
- Shōta Sometani
- Saori Hara
- Noriko Kijima
- Jun Miho

== Reception ==
Tom Mes of Midnight Eye called the film "sexy as sin ... watchable and entertaining", and wrote that "Yoshida's handling of the material is impressive."
