= Yuki Mamiya =

Japanese actress and model

- 間宮 夕貴
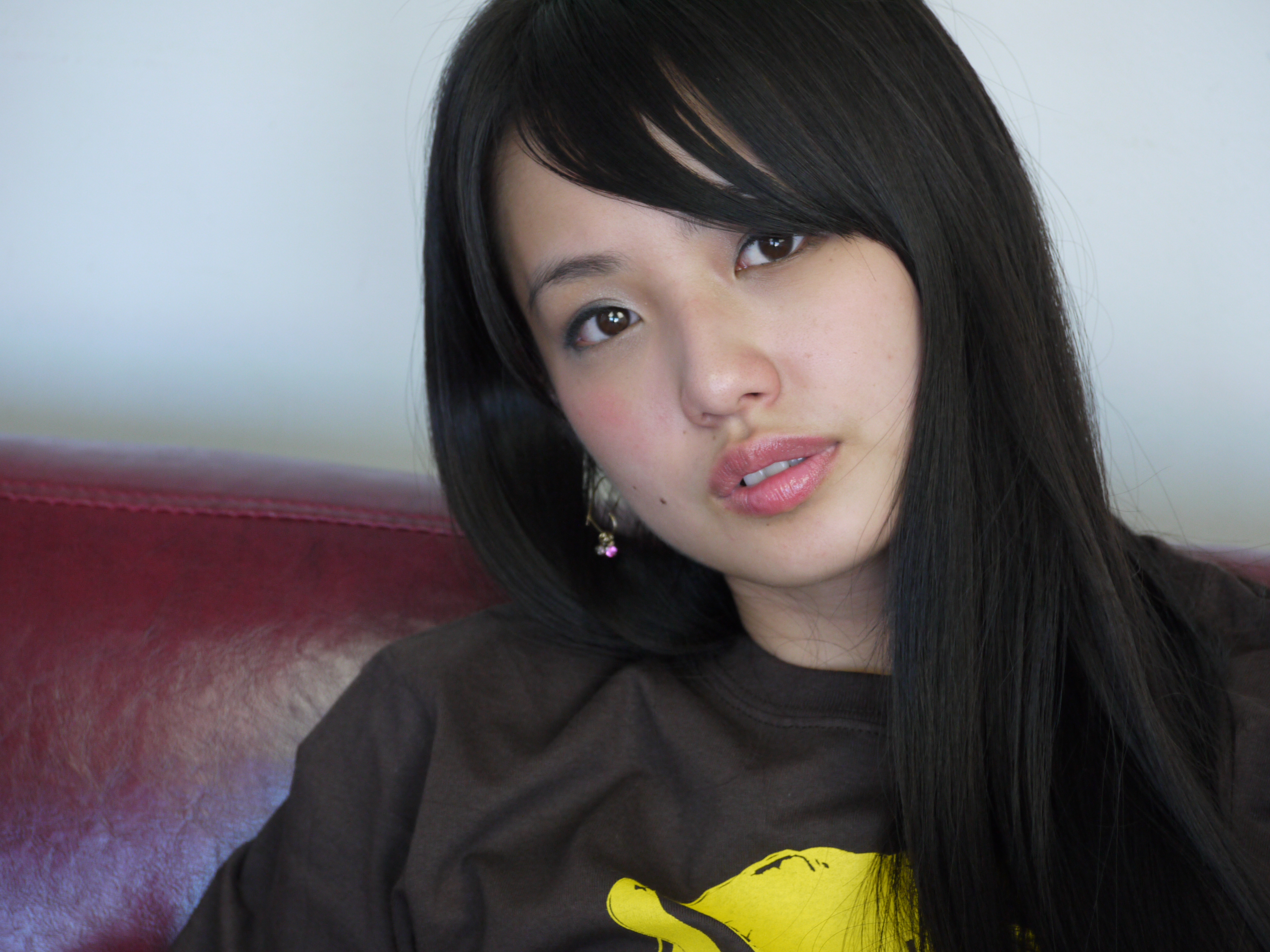
- Born: March 9, 1991 (age 35); Aichi Prefecture, Japan
- Other names: Yuki Mogami (最上 ゆき); Yuki Masuda (桝田 幸希)
- Occupations: Actress, model
- Years active: 2009–present
- Notable credits: Amai Muchi; The Torture Club; Wet Woman in the Wind
- Spouse: Tadashi Mizuno (m. 2026)
- Awards: Japanese Professional Movie Award

Yuki Mamiya (間宮 夕貴, Mamiya Yuki; born March 9, 1991), also known as Yuki Mogami (最上 ゆき, Mogami Yuki) and Yuki Masuda (桝田 幸希, Masuda Yuki), is a Japanese actress and gravure idol. She has appeared in numerous films, including Amai Muchi, The Torture Club, and the Nikkatsu film Wet Woman in the Wind, for which she received an Emerging Actress Award at the 26th Japanese Professional Movie Awards.

== Biography ==
Mamiya was born March 9, 1991, in Aichi Prefecture. Under the name Yuki Mogami she worked as a gravure idol starting in 2009, but changed her professional name in 2012 to pursue an acting career.

Mamiya started her film career with two Takashi Ishii films that were released in 2013. In the erotic thriller Amai Muchi she played the younger version of Naoko, with the older version of Naoko played by Mitsu Dan. She also appeared in the erotic romance film Hello, My Dolly Girlfriend, which was described by Mark Adams of Screen Daily as a "bizarre blend of voyeuristic sexuality and rather brutal violence". The next year she appeared in The Torture Club, an adaptation of Makoto Fukami's erotic comedy manga about a bondage club in a prestigious girls' school. In 2015 her photobook Trip was published by Takeshobo.

Mamiya starred in the 2016 erotic suspense film The Crawler in the Attic (屋根裏の散歩者, Yaneura no Sanposha), an adaptation of an Edogawa Ranpo story. That same year she played the lead role of Shiori in the Akihiko Shiota film Wet Woman in the Wind (風に濡れた女, Kaze ni nureta onna), one of five films commissioned by Nikkatsu as a new take on the roman porno films of the 1970s and 1980s. Glenn Kenny, writing for The New York Times, remarked that Mamiya had "a smoldering quality that fit the bill" but suggested that "the 'roman porno' reboot project should have rebooted its sexual politics". Slant Magazine noted the film's resemblance to "vintage American screwball comedy, in which a rigid man is freed of his reservations by the uninhibited behavior of a beautiful and intelligent woman". Mamiya received an Emerging Actress Award at the 26th Japanese Professional Movie Awards for her performance in Wet Woman in the Wind.

Mamiya appeared in a 2017 V-cinema spin-off of the Super Sentai television series Uchu Sentai Kyuranger and in the 2017 Yu Irie film Vigilante (ビジランテ). She played a villain with psychokinetic powers in the 2018 live-action TV Tokyo adaptation of the ONE manga Mob Psycho 100, then played the role of Maiko in Manabu Oda's feature debut film Simon and Tada Takashi, a "gay romance" about two friends on their way to meet an older woman for a date.

In 2018 she changed her professional name to Yuki Masuda.

On May 30, 2026, she announced her marriage to actor Tadashi Mizuno.

== Filmography ==
=== Films ===
- Amai Muchi, 2013
- Hello, My Dolly Girlfriend, 2013
- The Torture Club, 2014
- The Crawler in the Attic, 2016
- Wet Woman in the Wind, 2016
- Vigilante, 2017
- Simon and Tada Takashi (サイモン＆タダタカシ), 2018
- The Key: Professor's Pleasure, 2022
- Naomi: Reversed, 2024

=== Television ===
- Uchu Sentai Kyuranger: Episode of Stinger (V-Cinema), TV Asahi, 2017
- Mob Psycho 100, TV Tokyo, 2018

== Photobooks ==
- Amai muchi (甘い鞭), Kadokawa, 2013, ISBN 9784041105702
- Trip, Takeshobo, 2015, ISBN 9784801903913
