= Amai Muchi =

- Poster
- Directed by: Takashi Ishii
- Based on: Amai Muchi by Kei Ōishi
- Starring: Mitsu Dan; Yuki Mamiya; Tsuyoshi Nakano; Hiroko Nakajima; Naoto Takenaka; Hiroko Yashiki
- Music by: Gorō Yasukawa
- Distributed by: Kadokawa Pictures
- Release date: 21 September 2013 (Japan)
- Running time: 118 minutes
- Country: Japan
- Language: Japanese

Amai Muchi (Japanese: 甘い鞭) is a 2013 Japanese erotic drama film directed by Takashi Ishii, based on a novel of the same name by Kei Ōishi and starring Mitsu Dan, Yuki Mamiya and Tsuyoshi Nakano. It was released on 21 September 2013.

== Plot ==
While working as a doctor that treats infertility, Naoko is also the Celica, a masochist girl at SM clubs. She treats patients who adore Naoko like a virgin, and men who want Celica like a true masochistic girl who arouses sadistic feelings. Her double life began when she was 17 years old and endured a terrible incident.

== Cast ==
- Mitsu Dan as Naoko Misaki
  - Yuki Mamiya as 17-year-old Naoko

When she was 17 years old, Naoko was abducted and held captive by a man who lived next door, and after being toyed with for a month, killed him and barely escaped. She grew up with tremendous trauma and now, while she is gaining recognition as a doctor specializing in infertility treatments, she is also Celica, the popular masochist girl at SM clubs.

- Tsuyoshi Nakano as Takeo Fujita

He kidnapped 17-year-old Naoko and locked her in the basement of his house. He treated her as a sex slave for a month but was ultimately killed by her.

- Hiroko Nakajima as Kayoko Misaki

Naoko's mother. At first, she was worried for Naoko's safety, but after the case was resolved, she was unable to accept the reality of the violence her daughter had suffered, causing a rift in their relationship.

- Hiroko Yashiki as Keiko Kinoshita

Owner of the SM club that Naoko works at as Celica.

- Shun Nakayama as Narumi

A bouncer at the SM club and Kinoshita's right-hand man.

- Naoto Takenaka as Daigo

A top customer at the SM club.

- Yōzaburō Itō as Kamiyama

Customer of the SM club.

== Reception ==
=== Accolades ===
Year	Award	Category	Recipient	Result	Ref.
2014	Yokohama Film Festival	Best Music	Gorō Yasukawa	Won	
2014	Japan Academy Film Prize	Newcomer of the Year	Mitsu Dan	Won	
