= Wet Woman in the Wind =

2016 Japanese film by Akihiko Shiota

- Film poster
- Japanese: 風に濡れた女
- Directed by: Akihiko Shiota
- Written by: Akihiko Shiota
- Produced by: Keizo Yuri; Naoko Komuro; Tadashi Tanaka
- Starring: Tasuku Nagaoka; Yuki Mamiya
- Cinematography: Hidetoshi Shinomiya
- Edited by: Takashi Sato
- Music by: Shunsuke Kida
- Production company: Nikkatsu
- Distributed by: Nikkatsu
- Release date: 17 December 2016 (Japan)
- Running time: 78 minutes
- Country: Japan
- Language: Japanese

Wet Woman in the Wind (Japanese: 風に濡れた女, Hepburn: Kaze ni nureta onna) is a 2016 Japanese pink drama film written and directed by Akihiko Shiota and starring Tasuku Nagaoka and Yuki Mamiya. It was released on 17 December 2016.

== Plot ==
Dissipated Tokyo playwright, Kosuke has retreated to the countryside after deciding that he’s done with women, but the indefatigable cat-in-heat Shiori has other ideas, clinging to Kosuke like his shadow.

== Cast ==
- Tasuku Nagaoka as Kosuke Takasuke
- Yuki Mamiya as Shiori
- Ryushin Tei as Kubouchi
- Michiko Suzuki as Kyoko
- Hitomi Nakatani as Yuko
- Takahiro Katou as Yuzawa

== Production ==
In 2016, the films was announced by Nikkatsu as part of Roman Porno Reboot Project.

== Release ==
The film was screened at the 69th Locarno Film Festival, 21st Busan International Film Festival, and New York Asian Film Festival.

== Reception ==
On the review aggregator website Rotten Tomatoes, 82% of 11 critics' reviews are positive, with an average rating of 7.2/10. Chuck Bowen of Slant Magazine rated the film 3/5 stars. James Marsh of South China Morning Post rated the film four out of five stars.

The film was reviewed by Jonathan Romney for Screen Daily, Neil Young for The Hollywood Reporter and Glenn Kenny for The New York Times.

=== Accolades ===
Date	Award	Category	Recipients	Result	Ref.
2017	Japanese Professional Movie Awards	Emerging Actress	Yuki Mamiya	Won	
