= Mitsu Dan =

Japanese actress, model, and writer (born 1980)

- 壇 蜜
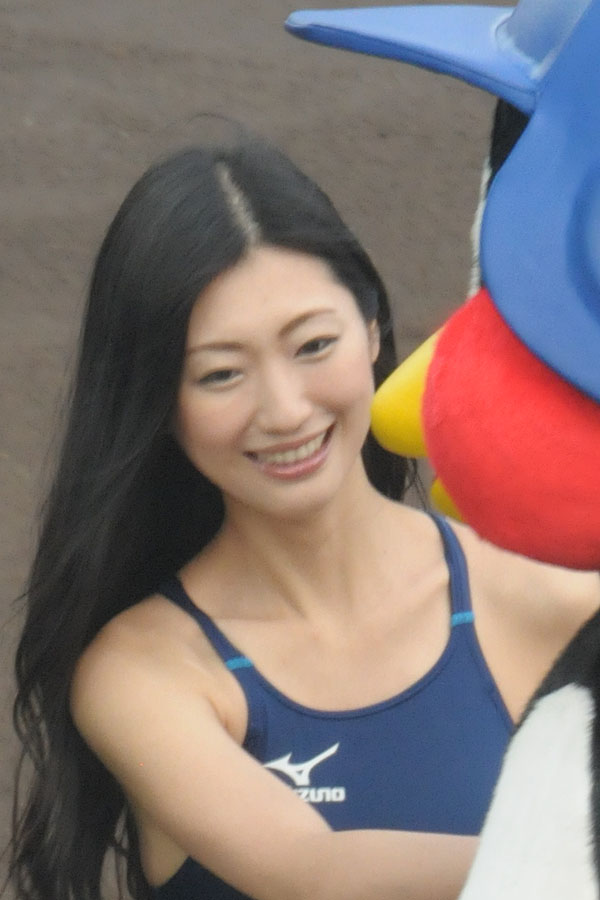
- Mitsu Dan at a baseball game in 2013
- Born: 齋藤 支靜加; December 3, 1980 (age 45); Yokote, Akita, Japan
- Education: Showa Women's University
- Occupations: Actress, gravure idol, writer
- Years active: 2010–present
- Notable work: Be My Slave; Amai Muchi
- Spouse: Tōru Seino (m. 2019)
- Awards: 37th Japan Academy Prize
- Website: dan-mitsu.jp

Mitsu Dan (壇 蜜, Dan Mitsu; born December 3, 1980) is the professional name of Shizuka Saitō (齋藤 支靜加), a Japanese actress, gravure idol, and writer. She has played multiple lead roles in television and film, including Naoko in the 2013 erotic thriller Amai Muchi, for which she received a Newcomer of the Year award at the 37th Japan Academy Prize ceremony.

== Early life and education ==
Mitsu Dan was born on December 3, 1980, in Akita Prefecture, Japan. After graduating from Showa Women's University, she earned a teaching certificate, worked in a funeral parlor, tried but failed to start a sweets shop, and worked as a hostess in a Ginza club before becoming a gravure idol in 2010.

== Career ==
Dan became known for her role in the BDSM-themed erotic thriller movie Be My Slave (2012), a performance that Giovanni Fazio of The Japan Times summarized as "a starlet is born." The next year she played a lead role in the 2013 erotic thriller Amai Muchi (甘い鞭, Sweet Whip), which was directed by Takashi Ishii. At the 37th Japan Academy Prize ceremony Dan was recognized as a Newcomer of the Year for her performance in Amai Muchi.

Over the next few years Dan appeared in numerous television dramas, variety programs, movies, and advertising campaigns, including the kaiju parody Chikyû bôei mibôjin (地球防衛未亡人, Earth Defense Widow), the 90th NHK asadora Hanako to Anne, a 2015 recruiting commercial for the Japan Self-Defense Forces, the 2016 Hulu Japan drama Crow's Blood, and the 2017 film Sekigahara. In 2018 Dan became a weekly host of the radio program Makoto Ōtake Golden Radio! The next year she appeared in the 99th NHK asadora Manpuku.

In July 2017 Dan starred in an official tourism promotion video for Miyagi Prefecture that was created using 2011 Tōhoku earthquake and tsunami reconstruction funds and published online. Female members of the Miyagi Prefectural Assembly, along with members of the public, claimed that the video was sexually suggestive and demanded that it be taken down. Miyagi governor Yoshihiro Murai initially defended the video on the grounds that it successfully brought attention to the prefecture, but after receiving hundreds of complaints in a month he ordered the video withdrawn. Later that year the Japanese Ministry of the Environment appointed Mitsu Dan as a public ambassador to promote home energy conservation.

Dan has written books in multiple genres, including the autobiographical book Mitsu no aji (蜜の味, A Taste of Honey), advice books Erosu no osahō (エロスのお作法, The Rules of Love) and Dōshiyō (どうしよう, What Should I Do?), and the food essay collection Tabetai no (たべたいの, I Want to Eat). She made her fiction debut in 2016 with a story in the Bungeishunjū literary magazine Ooru Yomimono (オール読物, All Reading). Since April 2017 she has written a monthly advice column for Otokemachi, an online publication of Yomiuri Shimbun. In March 2018 her story "Takumiharahara" (タクミハラハラ) was published in the literary magazine Bungakukai.

== Personal life ==
In a January 2013 interview with Shukan Post, Mitsu Dan confirmed her bisexuality, stating she had affections for a woman before her first relationship with a man and expressing ongoing attraction to both men and women.

Dan married manga artist Tōru Seino in November 2019.

== Recognition ==
- 2014: 37th Japan Academy Prize for Newcomer of the Year

== Works ==
- Mitsu no aji (蜜の味, A Taste of Honey), Shōgakukan, 2013, ISBN 9784093637350
- Erosu no osahō (エロスのお作法, The Rules of Love), Daiwashobō, 2013, ISBN 9784479771845
- Dōshiyō (どうしよう, What Should I Do?), Magajinhausu, 2016, ISBN 9784838728329
- Tabetai no (たべたいの, I Want to Eat), Shinchosha, 2017, ISBN 9784106107412

== Filmography ==
=== Films ===
- Be My Slave, 2012
- Amai Muchi, 2013
- Taishibōkei Tanita Shain Shokudō, 2013
- Figure na Anata, 2013
- Hello, My Dolly Girlfriend,
- Chikyū Bōei Mibōjin, 2014
- Sanbun no Ichi, 2014
- Sekigahara, 2017
- Hoshimeguri no Machi, 2018
- Eating Women, 2018
- Mashin Sentai Kiramager the Movie, 2021
- A Dog Named Palma, 2021
- Bad City, 2023

=== Television ===
- Tokumei Tantei, TV Asahi, 2012
- Otenki Oneesan, TV Asahi, 2013
- Hanzawa Naoki, TBS, 2013
- Hanako to Anne, NHK, 2014
- Coffee-ya no Hitobito, NHK, 2014
- Black President, Fuji TV, 2014
- Ore no Dandyism, TV Tokyo, 2014
- Arasa-chan Mushūsei, TV Tokyo, 2014
- Crow's Blood, Hulu Japan, 2016
- Manpuku, NHK, 2019
- Mikazuki, NHK, 2019
