= 4-Koma Nano Ace =

Japanese yonkoma manga magazine

- Cover of the September 2013 issue of 4-Koma Nano Ace, published by Kadokawa Shoten on August 9, 2013
- Categories: Yonkoma shōnen/seinen manga
- First issue: 9 March 2011
- Final issue: 9 September 2013
- Company: Kadokawa Shoten
- Country: Japan
- Based in: Tokyo
- Language: Japanese
- Website: www.kadokawa.co.jp/ace/4koma/

4-Koma Nano Ace (4コマnanoエース) was a Japanese yonkoma shōnen/seinen manga magazine published by Kadokawa Shoten. The magazine existed between 2011 and 2013.

== Series ==
- Aiura (Chama)
- Black Rock-chan (Ringo) (April 2011 – March 2012)
- Chotto Kawaii Iron Maiden (Makoto Fukami, Alpha Alf Layla)
- Eureka Seven nAnO (2012 – January 2013)
- G's Under Ground (Purapa)
- G-Sen Rough Sketch (Sakyū Tottori)
- Lucky Star (Kagami Yoshimizu)
- The Melancholy of Haruhi-chan Suzumiya (Puyo) (2007–present)
- Magical Record Lyrical Nanoha Force Dimension
- Nichijō (Keiichi Arawi)
- Chima R-15 (Nenga Ninomiya)
- Sora no Kyūsoku (Suka)
- Strike Witches Gekijōban: 501 Butai Hasshin Shimasu-! (Makoto Fujibayashi)
- Upotte!! (Kitsune Tennouji)
