= Kokone Sasaki =

Japanese actress (born 1990)

- 佐々木 心音
- Born: 22 May 1990 (age 36); Tokyo, Japan
- Occupations: Actress; singer-songwriter; tarento; gravure idol
- Agents: FilMoa; Ongaku Koubou You
- Spouse: Yusuke Kano (m. 2024)

Kokone Sasaki (佐々木 心音, Sasaki Kokone; born 22 May 1990, in Tokyo) is a Japanese actress, singer-songwriter, tarento and gravure idol.

== Personal life ==
On 7 July 2024, she announced her marriage with actor Yusuke Kano. They chose Tanabata, the anniversary of their grandfather's death, to submit their marriage registration.

== Filmography ==
=== Films ===
Year	Title	Role	Notes	Ref.
2013	Hello, My Dolly Girlfriend	Kokone		
2015	Sukimasuki	Fumio	Lead role	
2017	The Lowlife	Ayano	Lead role	
2016	Maria's Breast	Mao	Lead role	
2018	Call Boy	Noriko		
2021	Made in Heaven			
2023	Qualia	Yūko Tanaka	Lead role	

=== Television ===
Year	Title	Role	Notes	Ref.
2016	Ushijima the Loan Shark	Mina Yūki	Season 3	

=== Stage ===
Year	Title	Role	Notes	Ref.
2023	Ju-On the Live	Kayako Saeki		

== Bibliography ==
=== Photo albums ===
Year	Title	Book code
2012	One	ISBN 978-4-86084-873-6
2013	Figure na anata	ISBN 978-4-04-110463-7
2013	Tsurete itte	ISBN 978-4-06-352840-4
2014	Art Camera vol. 1	ISBN 978-4-575-30747-4
2016	Kairaku no Yakata	ISBN 978-4-06-220292-3

=== Talk collections ===
Year	Title	Book code
2015	Ima, Kōfuku ni tsuite Katarou Shinji Miyadai "Kōfuku-gaku" Taidan-shū	ISBN 978-4-864-36599-4
