= 1971 Cannes Film Festival =

- Official poster of the 24th Cannes Film Festival, an original illustration by French artist René Ferracci.
- Opening film: Gimme Shelter
- Closing film: The Married Couple of the Year Two
- Location: Cannes, France
- Founded: 1946
- Awards: Palme d'Or: The Go-Between
- No. of films: 26 (In Competition)
- Festival date: 12 May 1971 – 27 May 1971
- Website: festival-cannes.com/en

Cannes Film Festival
- 1972 1970

The 24th Cannes Film Festival took place from 12 to 27 May 1971. French actress Michèle Morgan served as jury president for the main competition. The Grand Prix du Festival International du Film, then the festival's main prize, was awarded to The Go-Between by Joseph Losey.

This edition paid tribute to Charlie Chaplin and honored him with the title of Commander of the national order of the Legion of Honor.

The festival opened with Gimme Shelter by David Maysles, Albert Maysles and Charlotte Zwerin, and closed with The Married Couple of the Year Two by Jean-Paul Rappeneau.

== Juries ==
=== Main Competition ===
- Michèle Morgan, French actress - Jury President
- Pierre Billard, French journalist and film critic
- Michael Birkett, British producer
- Anselmo Duarte, Brazilian filmmaker
- István Gaál, Hungarian filmmaker
- Sergio Leone, Italian filmmaker
- Aleksandar Petrović, Yugoslav filmmaker
- Maurice Rheims, French art historian and novelist
- Erich Segal, American author

=== Short Films Competition ===
- Véra Volmane, Franch journalist - Jury President
- Charles Duvanel, Swiss
- Etienne Novella, Franch

== Official selection ==
=== In Competition ===
The following feature films competed for the Grand Prix du Festival International du Film:

English title	Original title	Director(s)	Production country
Apokal		Paul Anczykowski	West Germany
Between Miracles	Per grazia ricevuta	Nino Manfredi	Italy
The Boat on the Grass	Le Bateau sur l'herbe	Gérard Brach	France
Death in Venice	Morte a Venezia	Luchino Visconti	Italy, France
Drive, He Said		Jack Nicholson	United States
Family Life	Życie rodzinne	Krzysztof Zanussi	Poland
The Flight	Бег	Aleksandr Alov and Vladimir Naumov	Soviet Union
The Go-Between		Joseph Losey	United Kingdom
Goya, a Story of Solitude	Goya, historia de una soledad	Nino Quevedo	Spain
Joe Hill		Bo Widerberg	Sweden, United States
Johnny Got His Gun		Dalton Trumbo	United States
Lady Caliph	La Califfa	Alberto Bevilacqua	France, Italy
Loot		Silvio Narizzano	United Kingdom
Love	Szerelem	Károly Makk	Hungary
The Married Couple of the Year Two (closing film)	Les mariés de l'an II	Jean-Paul Rappeneau	France, Italy, Romania
Mira		Fons Rademakers	Netherlands, Belgium
Murmur of the Heart	Le souffle au cœur	Louis Malle	France, Italy, West Germany
The Panic in Needle Park		Jerry Schatzberg	United States
Pindorama		Arnaldo Jabor	Brazil
Raphael, or The Debauched One	Raphaël ou le débauché	Michel Deville	France
Sacco & Vanzetti	Sacco e Vanzetti	Giuliano Montaldo	Italy, France
Sick Animals	Animale bolnave	Nicolae Breban	Romania
A Soul to Devils	闇の中の魑魅魍魎	Kō Nakahira	Japan
Taking Off		Miloš Forman	United States
Wake in Fright	Outback	Ted Kotcheff	Australia, United Kingdom, United States
Walkabout		Nicolas Roeg	United Kingdom, Australia, United States

=== Out of Competition ===
The following films were selected to be screened out of competition:

- Le Chasseur by François Reichenbach
- The Deadly Trap (La Maison sous les Arbres) by René Clément
- The Friends (Les amis) by Gérard Blain
- Gimme Shelter by David Maysles, Albert Maysles, Charlotte Zwerin
- The Hellstrom Chronicle by Walon Green
- Narcissus by Peter Foldes
- The Sacred Fire (Le feu sacré) by Vladimir Forgency
- The Trojan Women by Michael Cacoyannis

=== Short Films Competition ===
The following short films competed for the Short Film Palme d'Or:

- Astronaut Coffee Break by Edward Casazza
- Centinelas del silencio by Robert Amram
- Fair Play by Bronislaw Zeman
- Hans Hartrung by Christian Ferlet
- I mari della mia fantasia by Ernesto G. Laura
- Jardin by Claude Champion
- La fin du jeu by Renaud Walter
- Le coeur renverse by Maurice Frydland
- Memorial by James Allen
- Mixed-Double by Bent Barfod
- Patchwork by Georges Schwizgebel, Claude Luyet, Daniel Suter, Manolo Otero, Gérald Poussin
- Paul Delvaux, ou les femmes défendues by Henri Storck
- Star Spangled Banner by Roger Flint
- Stuiter by Jan Oonk
- Une statuette by Carlos Vilardebo

== Parallel Sections ==
=== International Critics' Week ===
The following feature films were screened for the 10th International Critics' Week (10e Semaine de la Critique):

- Breathing Together: Revolution of the Electric Family by Morley Markson (Canada)
- Bronco Bullfrog by Barney Platts-Mills (United Kingdom)
- Expédition punitive by Magyar Dessö (Hungary)
- Ich liebe dich, ich töte dich by Uwe Brandner (West Germany)
- Loving Memory by Tony Scott (United Kingdom)
- A Matter of Life (Question de vie) by André Théberge (Canada)
- Le Moindre geste by Jean-Pierre Daniel, Fernand Deligny (France)
- Les Passagers by Annie Tresgot (Algeria)
- Trash by Paul Morrissey (United States)
- Viva la muerte by Fernando Arrabal (Tunisia, France)

=== Directors' Fortnight ===
The following films were screened for the 1971 Directors' Fortnight (Quinzaine des Réalizateurs):

- Acadia, Acadia (L'Acadie, L'Acadie?!?) by Michel Brault and Pierre Perrault (Canada)
- Are You Afraid? (Er i bange?) (doc.) by Henning Carlsen (Denmark)
- Badou Boy by Djibril Diop Mambety (Senegal)
- Bang Bang by Andréa Tonacci (Brazil)
- Birds, Orphans and Fools (Vtáčkovia, siroty a blázni) by Juraj Jakubisko (France, Czechoslovakia)
- Brother Carl by Susan Sontag (Sweden)
- The Ceremony (Gishiki) by Nagisa Oshima (Japan)
- Cleopatra by Michel Auder (United States)
- The Cow (Gāv) by Dariush Mehrjui (Iran)
- Cuadecuc, vampir by Pere Portabella (Spain)
- Don't Deliver Us from Evil (Mais ne nous délivrez pas du mal) by Joël Séria (France)
- Du Cote D'Orouet by Jacques Rozier (France)
- Dziura w ziemi by Andrzej Kondratiuk (Poland)
- Agnus dei (Égi bárány) by Miklós Jancsó (Hungary)
- Equinox (Equinozio) by Maurizio Ponzi (Italy)
- A Fable by Al Freeman Jr. (United States)
- Fata Morgana by Werner Herzog (West Germany)
- Festival panafricain d'Alger 1969 (doc.) by William Klein (Algeria)
- La fin des Pyrénées by Jean-Pierre Lajournade (France)
- Four Nights of a Dreamer (Quatre nuits d'un rêveur) by Robert Bresson (France)
- Goin' Down the Road by Donald Shebib (Canada)
- How Tasty Was My Little Frenchman (Como era gostoso o meu francês) by Nelson Pereira Dos Santos (Brazil)
- It Is Necessary to Be Among the Peoples of the World to Know Them (Faut aller parmi l'monde pour le savoir) by Fernand Dansereau (Canada)
- Lea in Winter (Léa l'hiver) by Marc Monnet (France)
- Lenz by George Moorse (West Germany)
- The Machine by A. Shermann, J. Rozenberg (Switzerland)
- Le Maître du temps (doc.) by Jean-Daniel Pollet (France)
- Makin' It by Simon Hartog (United Kingdom)
- Mare's Tail by David Larcher (United Kingdom)
- Mathias Kneissl by Reinhard Hauff (West Germany)
- México, la revolución congelada by Raymundo Gleyzer (Argentina)
- O Capitão Bandeira Contra o Dr. Moura Brasil (Moi, Schizo) by Antônio Calmon (Brazil)
- Ni vainqueurs, ni vaincus by A. Cabado, N. Spoliansky (Argentina)
- Of Gods and the Undead (Os Deuses e os Mortos) by Ruy Guerra (Brazil)
- The Past That Lives by Philo Bregstein (Netherlands)
- Prea mic pentru un razboi atît de mare by Radu Gabrea (Romania)
- Puntos suspensivos o Esperando a los bárbaros by Edgardo Cozarinsky (Argentina)
- Rape (Voldtekt) by Anja Breien (Norway)
- The Salamander (La salamandre) by Alain Tanner (Switzerland, France)
- Sex Jack (Seikozu) by Kōji Wakamatsu (Japan)
- Staféta by András Kovács (Hungary)
- The Sudden Wealth of the Poor People of Kombach (Der plötzliche Reichtum der armen Leute von Kombach) by Volker Schlöndorff (West Germany)
- Los testigos by Charles Elsesser (Chile)
- Those Damned Savages (Les maudits sauvages) by Jean Pierre Lefebvre (Canada)
- THX 1138 by George Lucas (United States)
- Tokyo senso sengo hiwa by Nagisa Oshima (Japan)
- Umut by Yılmaz Güney (Turkey)
- Valparaiso, Valparaiso by Pascal Aubier (France)
- Voto más fusil by Helvio Soto (Chile)
- W.R. - Misterije organizma by Dušan Makavejev (Yugoslavia)
- Wanda by Barbara Loden (United States)

==== Short films ====
- Apotheosis by John Lennon, Yoko Ono (United Kingdom)
- Cannes, 70... by Jean-Paul Jaud (France)
- Essai à la mille by Jean-Claude Labrecque (Canada)
- Estado de sitio by Jaime Chávarri (Spain)
- Grumes by Jean-Pierre Bonneau (France)
- Habitude by Dan Wolman (Israel)
- La belleza by Arturo Ripstein (Mexico)
- La Pierre qui flotte by Jean-Jacques Andrien (Belgium)
- Le Cri by Paul Dopff (France)
- Le Vampire de la Cinémathèque by Roland Lethem (Belgium)
- Le voyage du Lieutenant Le Bihan by László Szabó (France)
- Les bulles du cardinal by Ody Roos (Luxembourg)
- Meatdaze by Jeff Keen (United Kingdom)
- Mégalodrame by Alain Colas (France)
- Moment by Stephen Dwoskin (United Kingdom)
- Monangambeee by Sarah Maldoror (Angola)
- Mortem by Adam Schmedes (Denmark)
- Okasareta hakui by Kōji Wakamatsu (Japan)
- Please Don't Stand On My Sunshine by Ned McCann (Australia)
- R.S.V.P. by W. Pinkston, J. Mason V. (United States)
- Rosée Du Matin by Jean Dasque (France)
- Sex by David Avidan (Israel)
- Sur les traces de Baal by Abdellatif Ben Ammar (Tunisia)
- Underground Again by Laure Guggenheim (France)
- Venceremos by Pedro Chaskel (Chile)
- Viva Cariri by Geraldo Sarno (Brazil)

== Official Awards ==
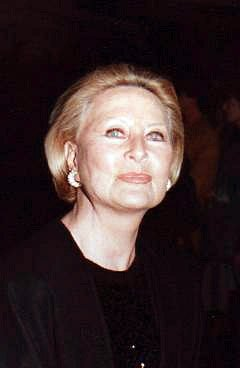
Michèle Morgan, Jury President

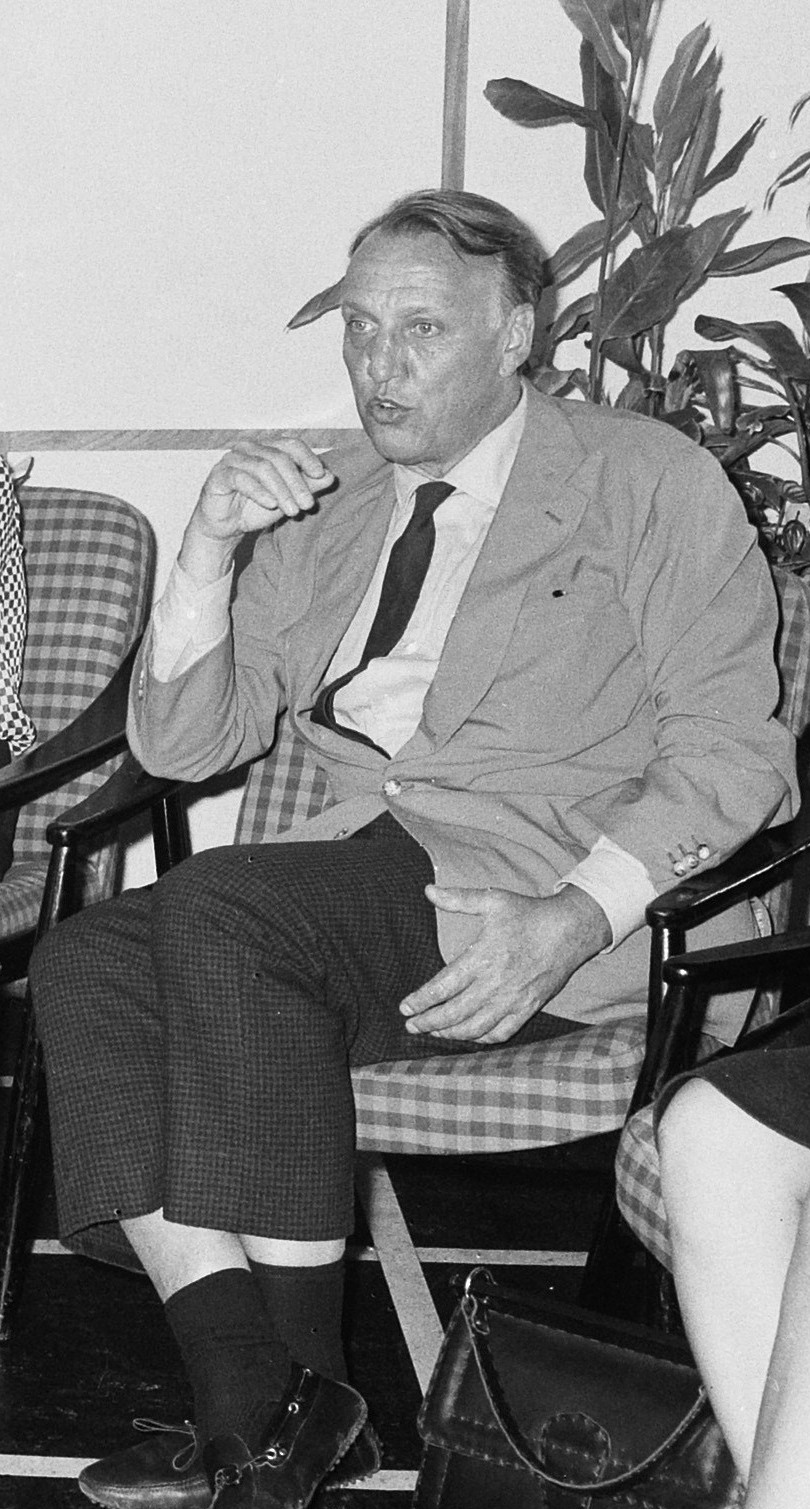
Joseph Losey, Palme d'Or winner

=== Main Competition ===
- Grand Prix du Festival International du Film: The Go-Between by Joseph Losey
- Grand Prix Spécial du Jury:
  - Johnny Got His Gun by Dalton Trumbo
  - Taking Off by Miloš Forman
- Best Actress: Kitty Winn for The Panic in Needle Park
- Best Actor: Riccardo Cucciolla for Sacco & Vanzetti
- Jury Prize:
  - Joe Hill by Bo Widerberg
  - Love by Károly Makk
- Best First Work: Between Miracles by Nino Manfredi
- 25th Anniversary Prize: Death in Venice by Luchino Visconti

=== Short Films Competition ===
- Prix spécial du Jury: Star Spangled Banner by Roger Flint
- Special Mention:
  - Stuiter by Jan Oonk
  - Une Statuette by Carlos Vilardebó

== Independent Awards ==
=== FIPRESCI Prize ===
- Johnny Got His Gun by Dalton Trumbo

=== Commission Supérieure Technique ===
- Technical Grand Prize: The Hellstrom Chronicle by Walon Green

=== OCIC Award ===
- Love by Károly Makk

=== Other Awards ===
- Special Mention: Lili Darvas and Mari Törőcsik, the lead actresses in Szerelem

== Media ==
- INA: 25th Cannes Film Festival (commentary in French)
- INA: Michèle Morgan, president of the 1971 jury (commentary in French)
- INA: About the film The Go-Between by Joseph Losey (interview in French and English)
