= Humbert Allen Astredo =

American actor (1929–2016)

Humbert Allen Astredo, Jr.
- Born: April 4, 1929; Pasadena, California, U.S.
- Died: February 19, 2016 (aged 86); Guilford, Connecticut, U.S.
- Burial place: Woodlawn Memorial Park Cemetery
- Education: Pasadena Playhouse
- Occupation: Actor
- Years active: 1948–1990
- Television: Dark Shadows (1968–1971)

Humbert Allen "Bud" Astredo, Jr. (April 4, 1929 – February 19, 2016) was an American stage, film, and television actor. He made several notable Broadway and Off-Broadway theatrical performances, but was best known for the numerous roles he performed on the daytime Gothic horror soap opera Dark Shadows, most notably that of the warlock Nicholas Blair.

== Early life ==
Astredo was born on April 4, 1929, in Pasadena, California to Humbert Allen and Bess Houston (née Alley) Astredo. His early childhood was spent in Pasadena, before the family moved to San Francisco. His mother taught him to play the piano, and he often performed at parties hosted by friends. His father took him sailboating, hunting, and fishing, and inculcated in him a passion for the arts. From an early age, his nickname was "Bud".

After graduating from high school, Astredo studied law at the University of San Francisco, but dropped out after discovering he hated public speaking. He then sold home-care products for the Fuller Brush Company door-to-door. A woman he'd contacted during a sales pitch suggested he go into acting. She arranged for him to meet a talent agent, who took him on a tour of the 20th Century Fox studio. The tour convinced Astredo that acting was something he wanted to do, and in 1950 he enrolled at the Pasadena Playhouse.

Astredo was drafted into the U.S. Army during the Korean War, and served in the Special Services division of the 8th Army, an entertainment unit. Astredo became well known in the Army for his acting, song and dance skills, particularly for his comedy routines.

== Early career ==
He left the military after the war ended, and returned to Los Angeles to take up acting. In 1957, he helped co-found the Hollywood Center Theatre there. He later managed the Los Angeles Repertory Theater Company from 1962 to 1963.

== Broadway and Dark Shadows ==
Astredo made his Broadway debut in the role of Cassio in Othello at the Off-Broadway Martinique Theater in 1964, in which James Earl Jones played the title role. He then studied at the Actors Studio under Lee Strasberg. His big break came in June 1967, when he played Sergius in Joseph Papp's Shakespeare in the Park production of Arms and the Man. Later that same year, he appeared Off-Broadway with Gene Hackman in Murray Schisgal's comedy Fragments at the Cherry Lane Theater.

Astredo auditioned for the highly popular Gothic soap opera Dark Shadows in either December 1967 or January 1968. The producers didn't hire him for the role he tried out for, but were so impressed with him that they decided to write a bigger part for him to play. On June 25, 1968, Astredo made his first appearance on Dark Shadows, performing the role of the warlock Nicholas Blair. He appeared in 100 episodes, also appearing as the character Charles Dawson (who lived, in the show's timeline, in the 1840s) and as the character Evan Hanley (who lived, in the show's timeline, in the 1890s). His last appearance on the series was on January 25, 1971. During his time on Dark Shadows, Astredo was known for his backstage wit, and he became close friends with his co-star, Lara Parker. Astredo played the role of "Dr. Forbes" in the 1970 Dark Shadows feature film, House of Dark Shadows.

While continuing to appear on Dark Shadows, Astredo also performed the role of the Belgian doctor in Lorraine Hansberry's Les Blancs, produced on Broadway at the Longacre Theatre, and starring James Earl Jones, Lili Darvas, and Earle Hyman. It was a triumphant performance for him. Theater critic Walter Kerr called Astredo's performance "impressively dimensional, rich in overtone". Critic Clayton Riley praised his performance as "the finest work among the secondary players", and "splendidly conceived and executed". At the end of the year, Kerr named Astredo as the "Most Promising Newcomer on Broadway".

== After Dark Shadows ==
After leaving Dark Shadows (the series left the air on April 2, 1971), Astredo appeared in Gore Vidal's An Evening with Richard Nixon on Broadway in May 1972 at the Shubert Theater as the Vidal-like character, for which critic Clive Barnes had positive remarks. Throughout the 1970s, Astredo appeared in a number of television commercials and stage productions throughout the country, as well as short runs in various roles in the daytime soap operas One Life to Live, Another World, The Edge of Night, The Guiding Light, Love of Life, and Loving.

In 1981, Astredo appeared in the Broadway cast of The Little Foxes, appearing with Elizabeth Taylor, and traveled to London for the West End production in 1982.

In 1985, Astredo performed the role of Dr. Abraham Van Helsing in the national touring company production of Dracula, opposite Martin Landau in the title role.

== Retirement and death ==
Astredo continued acting in plays on Broadway, Off-Broadway, and in regional productions until his retirement in 1990. After leaving acting, he indulged his passion for boating by sailing up and down the East Coast of the United States for several years before retiring in 2000 to a home in Guilford, Connecticut.

Humbert Allen Astredo, Jr. died in Guilford on February 19, 2016, at the age of 86.

== Personal life ==
Astredo married Jane M. Small in 1960. They divorced in 1968.

Astredo's daughter, Jennifer MacFarland Astredo, was born in 1961. She died of breast cancer in 2008.

== Bibliography ==
- Benshoff, Harry M. (2011). Dark Shadows. Detroit: Wayne State University Press. ISBN 9780814334393.
- Browning, John Edgar; Picart, Caroline Joan (2011). Dracula in Visual Media: Film, Television, Comic Book and Electronic Game Appearances, 1921-2010. Jefferson, N.C.: McFarland & Co. ISBN 9780786433650.
- O'Donnell, Monica M. (1984). Contemporary Theatre, Film, and Television. Detroit: Gale Research Co. ISBN 9780810320642.
- Hamrick, Craig; Jamison, R.J. (2012). Barnabas and Company: The Cast of the TV Classic 'Dark Shadows'. Bloomington, Ind.: iUniverse. ISBN 9781475910346.
- Kashner, Sam; Schoenberger, Nancy (2010). Furious Love: Elizabeth Taylor, Richard Burton, and the Marriage of the Century. London: JR Books. ISBN 9781907532221.
- Kolin, Philip C. (2002). "Blackness Made Visible: A Survey of Othello in Criticism, on Stage, and on Screen". Othello: Critical Essays. New York: Garland Press. ISBN 9780815335740.
- Walker, Alexander (1990). Elizabeth: The Life of Elizabeth Taylor. New York: Grove Press. ISBN 9780802137692.
- Willis, John (1992). Theatre World, 1990-1991 Season. New York: Applause Theatre Book Publishers. ISBN 9781557831255.
