= Goya, a Story of Solitude =

1971 Spanish film

- Film poster
- Directed by: Nino Quevedo
- Written by: Juan Cesarabea; Alfonso Grosso; Nino Quevedo
- Produced by: Carlos García Muñoz; Nino Quevedo; José Saguar
- Starring: Francisco Rabal; Irina Demick
- Cinematography: José F. Aguayo; Luis Cuadrado
- Edited by: Pablo González del Amo
- Release date: 1971
- Running time: 110 minutes
- Country: Spain
- Language: Spanish

Goya, a Story of Solitude (Spanish: Goya, historia de una soledad) is a 1971 Spanish historical drama film directed by Nino Quevedo. It was entered into the 1971 Cannes Film Festival. The film was heavily cut by censors before its release. It portrays the life of the Spanish artist Francisco Goya.

== Cast ==
- Francisco Rabal - Goya
- Irina Demick - Duchess of Alba
- Jacques Perrin
- José María Prada
- Teresa del Río
- Hugo Blanco
- María Asquerino
- Merche Abreu
- Barta Barri
- Enriqueta Carballeira
- Manuel de Blas - Duke of Alba
- Inma de Santis
- José Espinosa
- Rosario García Ortega
- Montserrat Julió
- Gerardo Malla
- Sergio Mendizábal
- Ricardo Merino
- Jeannine Mestre
- Luis Morris
- Marisa Paredes
- Teresa Rabal

== Bibliography ==
- Bentley, Bernard. A Companion to Spanish Cinema. Boydell & Brewer 2008.
