= Morley Markson =

Morley Markson is a Canadian industrial designer, film director and cinematographer from Toronto, Ontario. He is most noted for his 1974 film Monkeys in the Attic, which was a Canadian Film Award nominee for Best Picture at the 26th Canadian Film Awards in 1975, and his 1988 documentary film Growing Up in America, which was a Genie Award nominee for Best Feature Length Documentary at the 10th Genie Awards in 1989.

His 1971 film Breathing Together: Revolution of the Electric Family was a selection of the International Critics' Week at the 1971 Cannes Film Festival.

== Filmography ==
- Exploration (1967)
- Kaleidoscope (1967)
- America Simultaneous: The Electric Family (1968)
- Electrocution of the World (1968)
- Eyebang (1968)
- Light Year (1968)
- Retinal Capsule (1968)
- Zero (1968)
- The Tragic Diary of Zero the Fool (1969)
- Breathing Together: Revolution of the Electric Family (1971)
- Monkeys in the Attic (1974)
- Off Your Rocker (1982)
- Growing Up in America (1988)
