= Love (1971 film) =

- Directed by: Károly Makk
- Written by: Péter Bacsó
- Based on: Szerelem (1956); Két asszony(1962) by Tibor Déry
- Starring: Lili Darvas; Mari Törőcsik
- Cinematography: János Tóth
- Edited by: György Sívó
- Music by: András Mihály
- Distributed by: Ajay Film Company (USA)
- Release date: 21 January 1971
- Running time: 84 minutes
- Country: Hungary
- Languages: Hungarian; German

Love (Hungarian: Szerelem) is a 1971 Hungarian drama film directed by Károly Makk. Based on two short stories by Tibor Déry, Szerelem (1956) and Két asszony (1962), it stars Lili Darvas and Mari Törőcsik. The film was selected as the Hungarian entry for the Best Foreign Language Film at the 44th Academy Awards, but was not accepted as a nominee.

The film was selected for screening as part of the Cannes Classics section at the 2016 Cannes Film Festival. It was also chosen to be part of the New Budapest Twelve, a list of Hungarian films considered the best in 2000.

== Plot ==
The film is set in Hungary during the Stalinist era in the early 1950s. During an operation against dissidents, János, a film director, was arrested and sentenced to ten years in prison. His wife, Luca, has not seen her husband since and is kept in the dark about his condition. She is dismissed from her teaching position as politically unreliable. She ekes out a living as a newspaper cashier, under constant surveillance and harassment. Her friends are also paralyzed with fear. The state moves subtenants into her large city apartment. In order to survive, she must gradually sell off her valuable furniture and clothes.

Her ninety-year-old mother-in-law, frail and bedridden, lives in a small suburban house in a room with her books and a hodgepodge of dishes, blankets, and pictures from bygone eras, being looked after by a housekeeper. Luca visits her daily and regularly brings fresh flowers and small surprises; they play a game of supposedly not wanting to receive gifts. Her mother-in-law is attached to János, her youngest son; she expects great things from him. As a child, he was stubborn and mischievous, just like herself. She is very pleased with her daughter-in-law and her beauty, and the two are on good terms.

However, Luca has not told her about her son's arrest and conviction a year ago, instead leading her to believe that he has traveled to the USA to make a film. She ensures that her mother-in-law receives forged letters from her son in America, in which he writes about his successes, intentionally outlandish and fanciful to appeal to her vanity, but also that production difficulties prevent him from returning immediately. These supposed successes evoke memories from the mother's own upper-class past. Luca, on the other hand, is teetering on the brink of a nervous breakdown under the weight of worrying about János and the act she has to continue to perform. Her mother-in-law waits for János's return, but visibly deteriorates, having to be cared for day and night by the housekeeper and Luca. In her pride, she rejects a stranger's caregiver. She deteriorates and dies, not dying in her son's arms as she had expected.

A few months after her death, János is abruptly released from prison as a result of the Khruschev thaw. When Luca returns home that evening, János is waiting for her in her room. They reassure each other of their continued love.

== Cast ==
- Lili Darvas – The old woman
- Mari Törőcsik – Luca
- Iván Darvas – János
- Erzsi Orsolya – Irén
- László Mensáros – The doctor
- Tibor Bitskey – Feri (as Bitskei Tibor)
- András Ambrus – Börtönőr
- József Almási – Tanár
- Zoltán Bán – Borbély
- Éva Bányai – Feriék szolgálója
- Ágnes Dávid – Feriék szolgálója
- Mária Garamszegi – Feriék szolgálója
- Alíz Halda – Tanárnő
- Magda Horváth – Kissné
- Nóra Káldi – Az öregasszony fiatalon (as Káldy Nóra)

== Reception ==
Love won three prizes, including the Jury Prize at the 1971 Cannes Film Festival.

Derek Malcolm of The Guardian wrote, "The film is tough as old boots and completely unsentimental, but catches precisely what its characters face and how they feel. But it is sometimes quite difficult to bear because of the nature of the truths it tells. During the prisoner's journey home, for instance, Makk and his actor express perfectly not just the joy of freedom but the fear of finding that those he loves have forgotten or somehow freed themselves from him."

Stanley Kauffmann of The New Republic called Love 'a treasure'.

== See also ==
- List of submissions to the 44th Academy Awards for Best Foreign Language Film
- List of Hungarian submissions for the Academy Award for Best Foreign Language Film
