= Jess Walton =

Canadian actress

- Born: Grand Rapids, Michigan, U.S.
- Occupation: Actress
- Years active: 1969–present
- Spouses: Bruce Davison (m. 1972; ann. 1973) John James (m. 1980; died 2021)

Jess Walton is a Canadian-American actress. She is best known for her role as Kelly Harper in CBS soap opera Capitol and as Jill Abbott on the CBS soap opera, The Young and the Restless.

== Early life ==
Walton was born in Grand Rapids, Michigan, but raised in Toronto, Canada, where she attended Loretto Abbey Catholic Secondary School. She left home at the age of 17 and joined a Toronto theater company. In 1969, she moved to Hollywood and the next year signed with Universal Studios.

== Career ==
In 1970s, Walton guest-starred in a number of television shows, such as Medical Center; Kojak; Marcus Welby, M.D.; Ironside; The Rockford Files; Gunsmoke; Cannon; and Barnaby Jones. She co-starred in film The Strawberry Statement (1970), and portrayed the female lead roles of The Peace Killers (1971) and Monkeys in the Attic (1974). She also appeared in The Hunted Lady (1977) starring Donna Mills. During that time her social life also heated up and she was briefly wed to actor Bruce Davison from 1972–73; the marriage was annulled within the year. However, her life began to spiral out of control when she turned to alcohol and drugs. In 1980, she completed rehab.

In 1984, Walton returned to acting with the role of Kelly Harper on the CBS daytime soap opera, Capitol. The show was cancelled in 1987. Later in that year, Walton joined the cast of another CBS soap opera, The Young and the Restless, in the role as Jill Foster Abbott. The role was originally portrayed by Brenda Dickson, who departed in 1980, and the role was first recast with Deborah Adair. In 1983, Dickson returned to the role, and though she stated that she would never leave, she was replaced by Walton in 1987. Walton won a Daytime Emmy Award in 1997 for Lead Actress in a Drama Series for her portrayal of Jill, and was nominated in 1996, 2000, and 2017. She also won the Daytime Emmy for Outstanding Supporting Actress in 1991, after a nomination in 1990. In 2018, she starred alongside Patrick Duffy in the Netflix film, Christmas with a View.

== Personal life ==
Walton was married to John James, an author and founder of The Grief Recovery Institute from 1980 until his death in August 2021.

Walton briefly dated one of the managers for Joni Mitchell and Crosby, Stills, Nash & Young, and for a time, she associated with them and other musicians, including Laura Nyro and Neil Young. In an interview, Walton recalled a memorable occasion where Nyro taught Walton and Mitchell how to belly dance. Walton says that one of the houses featured on Joni Mitchell's Ladies of the Canyon cover belonged to her.

Walton was good friends with her Y&R co-star Jeanne Cooper, who portrayed her character Jill's arch-rival Katherine Chancellor, from 1973 until her death in May 2013.

== Filmography ==
Year	Title	Role	Notes
1969	The Guns of Will Sonnett	Abbey Garcia	Episode: "Robber's Roost"
1970	The Strawberry Statement	Student	
1970	The Young Lawyers	Clara Smith	Episode: "MacGillicuddy Always Was a Pain in the Neck"
1971	Montserrat		Television film
1971	The F.B.I.	Mary Douglas	Episode: "The Last Job"
1971	The Peace Killers	Kristen	
1971	Medical Center	Nancy	Episode: "Martyr"
1972	Young Dr. Kildare	Libby Cabot	Episode: "Death of Innocents"
1972	The Sixth Sense	Lilly Warren	Episode: "Coffin, Coffin in the Sky"
1972	The Victim	Susan Chappel	ABC Movie of the Week
1972	Marcus Welby, M.D.	Naomi Sobel	Episode: "Unto the Next Generation"
1972–1973	The Bold Ones: The New Doctors	Sharon McGraw	Episodes: "Short Flight to a Distant Star" and "The Night Crawler"
1973	Owen Marshall, Counselor at Law	Sheila Arnold	Episode: "Seed of Doubt"
1973	You'll Never See Me Again	Vicki Bliss	ABC Movie of the Week
1973	Gunsmoke	Patricia Colby	Episode: "Patricia"
1973	Ironside	Debbie	Episode: "The Ghost of the Dancing Doll"
1973	Cannon	Melanie	Episode: "Arena of Fear"
1974	Griff	Penny Coyle	Episode: "All the Lonely People"
1974	Kojak	Cheryl Pope	Episode: "Die Before They Wake"
1974	Toma		Episode: "Indictment"
1974	Rex Harrison Presents Stories of Love	Angelique	Television film
1974	Sierra	Gail	Episode: "Cruncher"
1974	Monkeys in the Attic	Elaine	
1974	Marcus Welby, M.D.	Dr. Janet Oliver	Episode: "The Fatal Challenge"
1974	Ironside	Jennifer	Episode: "The Lost Cotillion"
1975	The Six Million Dollar Man	E.J. Haskell	Episode: "Taneha"
1975	Cannon	Janet Coin	Episode: "Missing at FL307"
1975	Movin' On	Olivia	Episode: "Ammo"
1975	The Rockford Files	Laura Smith	Episode: "The Four Pound Brick"
1975	Gunsmoke	Kattalin Larralde	Episode: "Manolo"
1975	S.W.A.T.	Carole Ritchie	Episode: "Hit Men"
1975	Cannon	Janice Elder	Episode: "The Victim"
1975	Starsky & Hutch	Theresa Defusto	Episode: "Shootout"
1976	Jigsaw John		Episode: "Thicker Than Blood"
1976	Baretta	Muriel	Episode: "Soldier in the Jungle"
1976	The Streets of San Francisco	Lois Flynn	Episode: "In Case of Madness"
1977	Switch	Angela Mendarez	Episode: "Three for the Money"
1977	Barnaby Jones	Doris Carson	Episode: "The Killer on Campus"
1977	The Hunted Lady	Kate	Television film
1979	The Return of Mod Squad	Kate	Television film
1979	Mrs. Columbo	Judy Arno	Episode: "A Chilling Surprise"
1980	Insight	Joanna	Episode: "Thea"
1984–1987	Capitol	Kelly Harper	Series regular Nominated — Soap Opera Digest Award for Outstanding Lead Actress in a Daytime Drama (1986, 1988)
1987–present	The Young and the Restless	Jill Abbott	Series regular Daytime Emmy Award for Outstanding Lead Actress in a Drama Series (1997); Daytime Emmy Award for Outstanding Supporting Actress in a Drama Series (1991); Soap Opera Digest Award for Outstanding Lead Actress in a Daytime Drama (1994); Nominated — Daytime Emmy Award for Outstanding Lead Actress in a Drama Series (1996, 2000, 2017); Nominated — Daytime Emmy Award for Outstanding Supporting Actress in a Drama Series (1990); Nominated — Online Film & Television Association Award for Best Actress in a Daytime Serial (1997, 2003); Nominated — Online Film & Television Association Award for Best Supporting Actress in a Daytime Serial (1998, 2009); Nominated — Soap Opera Digest Award for Outstanding Lead Actress in a Daytime Drama (1996, 2000); Nominated — Soap Opera Digest Award for Outstanding Villainess in a Drama Series – Daytime (1989)
1999	Wasted in Babylon	Hellen Cook	
2005	Paper Bags	Margaret Rose	Short film
2006	The Return of the Muskrats	Soap Actress	Short film
2018	Christmas with a View	Jackie Haven	Television film
