= Breathing Together: Revolution of the Electric Family =

1971 Canadian documentary film

- Directed by: Morley Markson
- Written by: Morley Markson
- Produced by: Morley Markson
- Cinematography: Morley Markson
- Edited by: Morley Markson; John N. Smith
- Production companies: Morley Markson & Associates
- Distributed by: New Line Cinema
- Release date: April 15, 1971
- Running time: 84 minutes
- Country: Canada
- Language: English

Breathing Together: Revolution of the Electric Family is a Canadian documentary film, directed by Morley Markson and released in 1971. The film is a profile of many of the politically and culturally radical figures who established and defined counterculture in the 1960s.

Figures appearing in the film include Donald L. Cox, Buckminster Fuller, Allen Ginsberg, Fred Hampton, John Lennon, Abbie Hoffman, William Kunstler, Timothy Leary, Jerry Rubin and John Sinclair.

The film premiered on April 15, 1971, at the Whitney Museum in New York City, as part of the New American Filmmakers Series. It was subsequently screened in the International Critics' Week program at the 1971 Cannes Film Festival, and had its Canadian premiere at Toronto's Poor Alex Theatre's summer screening series of Canadian films in June 1971.

A sequel, Growing Up in America, was released in 1988 to profile the ways in which many of the figures profiled in the original film had evolved from "yippies" into "yuppies".
