= Growing Up in America =

1988 Canadian documentary film

- Directed by: Morley Markson
- Written by: Morley Markson
- Produced by: Morley Markson; Don Haig
- Cinematography: Morley Markson
- Edited by: Morley Markson
- Production companies: Morley Markson & Associates
- Release date: September 15, 1988 (TIFF)
- Running time: 84 minutes
- Country: Canada
- Language: English

Growing Up in America is a Canadian documentary film, directed by Morley Markson and released in 1988. A sequel to his 1971 film Breathing Together: Revolution of the Electric Family, the film profiles many of the same 1960s radical figures who had been featured in the original film, and the "yippies to yuppies" transformation that many of them had undergone by the 1980s.

Figures appearing in the film include Donald L. Cox, Allen Ginsberg, Fred Hampton, Fred Hampton Jr., Abbie Hoffman, William Kunstler, Timothy Leary, Jerry Rubin and John Sinclair.

The film premiered in the Canadian Perspective stream at the 1988 Toronto International Film Festival. In conjunction with the film's premiere, Hoffman performed a two-night stand-up comedy stint at Toronto's Horseshoe Tavern.

The film received a Genie Award nomination for Best Feature Length Documentary at the 10th Genie Awards in 1989. The film had its television premiere on First Choice in June 1989.
