= Les Blancs =

1970 play written by Lorraine Hansberry

- Original language: English
- Written by: Lorraine Hansberry
- Characters: Tshembe Matoseh; Charlie Morris; Madame Neilsen; Major George Rice; Abioseh Matoseh; Eric; Peter (aka Ntali); Ngago; Dr. Marta Gotterling; Dr. Willy DeKoven; The Woman
- Subject: Africa, colonialism, revolution
- Setting: Ztembe, a fictional sub-Saharan African country

Premiere
- Date: November 15, 1970
- Place: Longacre Theatre, New York City

Les Blancs ("The Whites") is an English-language play by American playwright Lorraine Hansberry. It debuted on Broadway on November 15, 1970 and ran until December 19, 1970. The play was Lorraine Hansberry’s final work and she considered it her most important, as it depicts the plights of colonialism in the late 19th and early 20th centuries. It is her only play that takes place in Africa, and it uses both dance and music as signifiers of black and African cultures, a concept called the Black Aesthetic.

The play is about the experience of settlers, natives, and an American journalist in an unnamed African country in the waning days of colonial control.

The title is an echo reference to Jean Genet's 1959 play Les Negres (The Blacks), which Hansberry saw, and critically reviewed, during its 1960 U.S. premiere run.

== Text ==
First performed in late 1970, nearly six years after Hansberry’s death, the play was compiled and edited by her ex-husband Robert Nemiroff from her incomplete drafts. Hansberry considered Les Blancs her most important play. It is the only play of many left behind after her death that Nemiroff finished and adapted into a final version. The text was first published in 1972, in a volume called Les Blancs: The Collected Last Plays of Lorraine Hansberry, which also includes The Drinking Gourd and What Use are Flowers?.

A revised text of the play was created in 2016 for the UK's National Theatre by director Yaël Farber, dramaturg Drew Lichtenburg, and Nemiroff's stepdaughter Joi Gresham, director and trustee of the Lorraine Hansberry Literary Trust.

== Development ==
Hansberry began writing Les Blancs in 1960 after having what her husband called a “visceral response” upon seeing the U.S. production of Jean Genet's Les Nègres (The Blacks). Feeling the Frenchman’s view of colonialism was too rooted in a romantic exoticism of Africa, she hoped to write a more realistic account of African colonialism and the issues of power, politics, and identity that came with it. The title Les Blancs is a reference to this play.

She attributed her interest in colonialism as beginning when she watched newsreel footage of the Italian conquest of Ethiopia, and her mother telling her that the Pope had ordained the invasion. After taking courses on African history and culture under WEB DuBois, she went on to work for Paul Robeson’s newspaper Freedom. There she worked alongside Africans and African Americans working towards liberation, influencing the ideas that would later become Les Blancs.

She spent years working on Les Blancs, constantly rewriting and editing, taking it with her to and from hospital visits as her health deteriorated. She took what would later become Act I scene iii to the Actors Studio Writer's Workshop where, encouraged by the response, she witnessed the only performance of Les Blancs to happen in her lifetime. Using Nemiroff as her sounding board and editor, she almost completed the play before her death. Using notes from her collection, discussions they’d had about the work together, and at times creating some of his own dialogue to fill the gaps, her husband spent years working on it before release.

Hansberry originally planned to have a female protagonist, but revised the play so the only black woman has no name and no lines, referred to only as "The Woman". She used the independence movements of Ghana and Kenya as inspiration for her background, using Jomo Kenyatta as a template for the revolutionary leader in the play.

Written as part of the Black Arts Movement, Les Blancs grapples with the ideas of pan-Africanism and the global nature of colonialism seen in many of the other works coming out at the time.

== Synopsis ==
=== Act 1 ===
A white American journalist, Charlie Morris, arrives at the mission – a remote and very rustic Protestant medical missionary outpost in Africa. He meets the idealistic and slightly naive young Dr. Marta Gotterling and the cynical much older Dr. Willy DeKoven. He also meets a wise and kindly old now-blind Norwegian woman, Madame Neilsen, the wife of Reverend Torvald Neilsen, who is currently away performing baptisms and a funeral across the river. The Neilsens have been at the mission for 40 years, and Madame Neilsen knows and loves the Africans and understands their traditions – but tells Charlie that for many years now "the trouble" has distanced the Africans from the Neilsens.

Major George Rice appears, dragging a young African man by a noose a young African man and possible terrorist he refers to as "it", and informs Charlie of the ongoing conflict between the Colonial Reserve and terrorist members of the African resistance. After leaving the mission, the Major shoots the young man off-stage. Charlie and Dr. DeKoven discuss Amos Kumalo, the leader of the non-violent independence movement, who has been in Europe negotiating and has returned to the country.

Tshembe Matoseh, a former villager who has become a world-travelled businessman with a white wife and biracial son, returns from his home in London to the village only one day too late to see his dying father, Old Abioseh. Tshembe tells his much younger, biracial half-brother Eric, whom he hasn't seen in seven years, of his family in England, and they discuss the struggle for independence. Their oldest brother Abioseh Matoseh returns to the village from a Catholic educational institution, St Cyprian's, wearing clerical garb, and reveals that he is in the process of being ordained as a priest. Tshembe rejects Abioseh's capitulation to Roman Catholicism, and Abioseh rejects the traditional African funeral ceremony being held for their father, creating a conflict of cultures between the two brothers.

Charlie is attempting to convince Dr. Gotterling to join him for a walk when Major Rice arrives and tells them of a peaceful white family nearby that has just been murdered by terrorists. Tshembe arrives to renew his friendship with Madame Neilsen, but Major Rice calls him a "kaffir" before he identifies himself, and afterwards searches him for the tattoo sign of the terrorist group. He continues to belittle Tshembe, calling him "boy", and asking him why "you educated chaps" don't "talk sense" to the terrorists.

In a conversation full of tension, Charlie expresses to Tshembe a desire to transcend ingrained race relations and to deeply understand and possibly publicize the Africans and their struggle, but Tshembe points up Charlie's unspoken paternalism, his unconscious internalized superiority, and his and other whites' need to find salvation or fulfillment at Africa's expense.

Tshembe confronts his confused, directionless, and misguided biracial teenage half-brother Eric about wearing makeup given to him by Dr. DeKoven and "turning into a white woman", and about his excessive drinking. Tshembe wants to take Eric to live with him in London, but Abioseh wants him to go to the boarding school at St Cyprian's.

Tshembe learns that Peter (who goes by his birth name Ntali in the village), the African longtime head servant at the medical mission, is part of the terrorist group. He also learns that his own father, the now-deceased Old Abioseh, had started the resistance movement several years previously. Peter, along with a militant villager named Ngago, try to recruit Tshembe to the terrorist group, but he tells Peter that Kumalo has returned to the country for negotiations and that he will go to Kumalo and deliver the people's messages to him, instead. Peter believes that strategy to be ineffectual and says the terrorists are determined to rule by whatever means necessary. Tshembe is distraught and reminds himself, "I have renounced all spears!"

=== Act 2 ===
Charlie questions Dr. Gotterling about Reverend Neilsen, trying to explore his motives in coming to Africa to found a mission, but she idolizes the reverend, and rejects the notion that his mission exploited the villagers in any way or took advantage of the deprivation in the area. She also tells Charlie that the Africans "haven't earned the right to criticize yet" about the way they are treated by white settlers.

Major Rice appears at the mission, saying that "this colony has always depended on the sacredness of a white life", and that because of the terrorist groups and because Kumalo has been arrested and killed, he is assuming full command at the mission. He states full-scale military operations, including internment camps for all African males and relocation of all African females and children, will be implemented. Troops will be quartered at the mission.

Tshembe arrives at the mission, and is told Kumalo is dead. Charlie again attempts to engage Tshembe, but in another heated exchange he tells Charlie he is tired of words and tries to explain to him that nothing can come of their talking. Charlie wants Tshembe, as an educated and successful African expat businessman, to speak to the West on behalf of Africa, but Tshembe explains that for generations, lip service by white colonizers, governments, and apparent sympathizers have yielded no results but only the continued exploitation, oppression, mutilation, and murder of Africans. He says innumerable non-violent negotiations and protests have accomplished nothing. In his mind Tshembe sees The Woman (a non-speaking, symbolic role), a symbol of the urge he feels to rejoin his African roots by way of the resistance, and murmurs, "She has come for me now", but when internally impelled to choose sides he shouts in anguish, "I am just one man!"

When Eric expresses his desire to join the terrorists, Abioseh reminds him he is half-white. Eric accidentally reveals to him that Peter is part of the terrorist group, which Abioseh condemns. When Tshembe appears Abioseh appeals to him as an upright, educated African like himself to wait till "the terror" has passed or is suppressed so that the two of them and others like them can step in afterwards and be peaceful leaders. Tshembe calls Abioseh an Uncle Tom and a Judas, but Abioseh is determined to report Peter to Major Rice, even though Peter was a village elder who helped raise the two brothers.

Dr. DeKoven tells Charlie that the charitable medical work done at the unmodernized, unelectrified mission actually enables colonialism because keeping the villages and tribes uneducated and poor promotes subservience, white paternalism, and colonialism. He recounts that Reverend Neilsen had poured scorn on the villagers' proposal and petition for proportionate native representation in the legislature, which they had planned to take to the government in the capital. After that the villagers stopped coming to the mission except for medical needs. After their petitions went unheard in the capital and in Europe, the resistance movement was born. The natives stopped paying taxes, and the colonial government sent in soldiers, which then led to the terrorist groups.

Tshembe goes to the mission to warn Peter that his cover has been blown, but Major Rice and Abioseh arrive first. The Major announces that Reverend Neilsen has been killed in a terrorist raid and that he has called in fresh troops, helicopters, jets, and mechanized units for a new coordinated military offensive. He calls for Peter and, after humiliating him by making him grovel and praise white rule, he shoots and kills him when upon being confronted he admits to cutting the flare system at the mission compound.

Speaking to Charlie, Major Rice calls the country "my country" and exults over "our beautiful hills", concluding, "We wish the blacks no ill, Mr. Morris. But they are our hills." After he leaves, Dr. DeKoven tells Charlie that Major Rice is Eric's father, having raped Tshembe's and Abioseh's mother Aquah, who died in childbirth; he adds, "they say, from shame".

Ngago calls the Kwi people together and describes the three centuries of murders, massacres, rapes, land grabs, oppression, and imprisonment committed by white colonizers. He calls on the men to kill and drive out the invaders.

As the country erupts in chaos, the whites are told to evacuate from the mission within 24 hours. As Charlie and the doctors leave, Dr. Gotterling and Madame Neilsen each separately tell Charlie to write the truth of what he has seen and knows.

Madame Neilsen tells Tshembe that, at 68, she is too old to leave and that Africa is her home and her final resting place. She reveals that Reverend Neilsen unfortunately believed that God intended that the races must remain separate, and that he wanted Aquah's unborn biracial child (Eric) to die and Aquah with it. Tshembe tells her he doesn't know what to do, regarding the terrorist movement. She tells him that Africa needs warriors and that colonialism will go on unchecked if not stopped. When they part, Tshembe kills his brother Abioseh and cries out in anguish.

Madame Neilsen sits quietly by her husband's casket inside the mission that night, and blows out her candle, sitting in the dark. As villagers enter the compound, Eric sets fire to the mission.

== Productions ==
The play premiered on November 15, 1970, in a Broadway production at the Longacre Theatre, and ran through December 19, 1970. It was nominated for two Tony Awards, for Best Costumes and Lili Darvas was nominated for Best Featured Actress in a Play her performance as Madame Neilsen. James Earl Jones received a Drama Desk Award for his performance.

A revised production of Les Blancs directed by Yaël Farber played at the National Theatre in London between 22 March and 2 June 2016. The new text was developed by Farber, dramaturg Drew Lichtenburg, and Nemiroff's stepdaughter Joi Gresham, director and trustee of the Lorraine Hansberry Literary Trust. A film of the production was made available to watch for free online for one week on YouTube in July 2020 as part of the National Theatre at Home project during COVID-19 lockdown.

=== Cast and characters ===
Character	1970 Broadway	2016 National Theater	Description
Tshembe Matoseh	James Earl Jones	Danny Sapani	Former villager who lives in London; second son of Old Abioseh and Aquah
Madame Neilsen	Lili Darvas	Siân Phillips	68-year-old wife of Reverend Neilsen; they came to Africa from Norway 40 years previously to found the medical mission
Charlie Morris	Cameron Mitchell	Elliot Cowan	An American journalist researching a piece on the Neilsen's medical mission
Major George Rice	Ralph Purdum	Clive Francis	A white settler who came to the country as a boy and grew up in Africa, and who has assumed military command of the area
Abioseh Matoseh	Earle Hyman	Gary Beadle	Oldest son of Old Abioseh and Aquah; brother of Tshembe and Eric
Eric	Harold Scott	Tunji Kasim	Biracial teenage half-brother of Tshembe and Abioseh; son of Aquah
Dr. Willy DeKoven	Humbert Allen Astredo	James Fleet	Cynical older doctor at the mission, who tends to defy Major Rice
Dr. Marta Gotterling	Marie Andrews	Anna Madeley	Idealistic young doctor who has been at the mission seven years
Peter	Clebert Ford	Sidney Cole	Head servant at the mission and secretly a member of the terrorist group; former elder of the village
Ngago	George Fairley	Roger Nsengiyumva	A warrior in the village and a militant leader of the terrorist group
The Woman	Joan Derby	Sheila Atim	A non-speaking role symbolizing the Pan-African resistance movement

== Characters and character relationships ==
- The Woman: The abstract, non-speaking representation of the growing conflict in Africa and the growing conflict within the heart of the main protagonist, Tshembe. She appears only to Tshembe as a decorated spear-bearing warrior; dancing rhythmically to war drums. She appears to him on two different occasions when he is confronted with the choice to join the conflict or not. She first appears in the first scene dancing to the drums. Tshembe confronts her directly at the end of a scene in which he has a tense conversation with Charlie Morris. He tries to rebuke her, saying, "I have renounced all spears!"
- Tshembe Matoseh: The protagonist. He is the son of a Kwi chief and is returning to attend his father's funeral who had died before he could arrive. He is returning from England where he immigrated and gained a formal English education. He is married to an English woman and they have had a child together. Throughout the story Tshembe tells everyone, including the Woman, that he simply wants to honor his father and return home to his family. However, the conflict in Africa, including the Woman, will not let him go and he is inevitably dragged into the mounting revolution.
- Abioseh Matoseh: Tshembe's brother. He has fully embraced the culture of the west as he is training to be an ordained Catholic priest. He hopes that taking on this lifestyle will allow him to share in the power held by the white settlers. He argues with Tshembe over the well-being of their much younger brother Eric; Tshembe wants Eric to return to England with him, while Abioseh wants Eric to come with him to potentially join the priesthood. The story uses Abioseh as a symbol of full assimilation as he has denounced his heritage to the point of betraying his own people. Tshembe conversely symbolizes his own inevitable joining of the revolution by executing him for his betrayal.
- Eric/Ngedi: The teenage, biracial brother of Tshembe and Abioseh, the result of their mother's rape by Major Rice. He is a rash young man with an affinity for alcohol usually provided to him by Dr. Willy DeKoven. Eric is an impressionable youth who is also caught up in the mounting conflict. He was the only one of the brothers to be with their father (Old Abioseh) when he died. He confronts Tshembe about this when they meet after his older brother's time in England and they have an amusing conversation about Tshembe’s red-headed white wife. Essentially orphaned, Eric is caught between his two older brothers who argue over who shall take responsibility for him.
- Madame Neilsen: A sharp and intelligent older woman and the wife of Reverend Neilsen who started the Mission 40 years prior when they were in their late 20s. Many of the members of the Kwi tribe look up to her as a mother figure, including Tshembe and his brothers. When they were all young, she taught them and acted towards them as a surrogate mother. She is outraged by the encroaching colonial military, led by Major George Rice and pushes Tshembe into joining the revolution. This leads to her untimely death during the initial hostilities.
- Dr. Willy DeKoven: A doctor in his mid to late forties who has been part of the mission for twelve years. He carries himself with a lofty air as he is hyper-aware of how terrible the situation is and has essentially numbed himself to it. Though he is prone to drinking, he is one of the wisest characters in the play. He shows himself to be very brave and compassionate while also seeming like he has given up. He acknowledges that the mission, though working with good intentions is actually part of the problem. Hansberry uses Dr. DeKoven as a device for background on the setting: such as that colonial delegations that visited when he had first started working there. He reacts towards Major Rice and his military forces with vehemence and bitter passive-aggressiveness.
- Dr. Marta Gotterling: A young doctor who is passionate about her job. She is the newest member of the Mission and has only been there seven years. Besides The Woman she is the first character shown on the stage. She has an outspoken pride for the creative thriftiness of the Mission Hospital, which Dr. DeKoven considers to be a naïve obliviousness of the discrimination against the African natives as a white hospital only 75 miles away is top of the line. She finds her life to be very fulfilling and she is very protective of the hospital and the Reverend. She has a couple of conversations with Charlie Morris, which are rife with clever quips and sexual tension.
- Charlie Morris: A middle-aged journalist from America whom we see first in the opening scene with Marta Gotterling. He is there to report on the growing conflict. He is very idealistic and as such, he is very naïve to the growing conflict between the African natives and the English settlers. He has a penchant for overgeneralizations that Tshembe dismantles in a conversation about the truth behind hate and racism. He looks down on the hospital’s poverty while also being fascinated by it. He carries himself with an air of enlightened superiority while also being very willing to help. He reacts towards Major Rice with blatant defiance. He and Tshembe have a few tense conversations but they manage to find common ground before he leaves.
- Major George Rice: The antagonistic element of the play. He is a leader of the colonial military forces. He represents both the oppressive colonial regime and is a symbol for blatant racism as he is always using racial slurs. He honestly and openly refers to the whites as superior to the Africans and treats them like idiot children. We see this clearly when he is treating Peter like a servant. He is deeply suspicious of anyone who sympathizes with the African natives. Hansberry uses Major Rice to fulfill a few different roles. One is that of exposition, as he relates action that takes place off-stage, and the other is that of a focus of rising tension. Every scene featuring Major Rice leads to escalation of the conflict in some way; whether blatantly accusing Dr. DeKoven of harboring “terrorists” or by informing the characters of an 8:30 curfew. Although he may be the antagonist, he is doing everything that he believes is right for the people of Africa. As he mentions in his monologue in Act 1, he is doing this because the times are in demand of a leader against the "terrorists".
- Peter/Ntali: The middle-aged cousin of Tshembe and his brothers, a servant at the Mission, and a member of the resistance. While speaking with Tshembe, he speaks completely normally but while dealing with white characters such as Charlie and Rice he uses varying degrees of speech stereotypical of natives; such as replacing “Th” with “D” for example, and calling the whites "Bwana". He confronts Tshembe while he is attempting to sort cloth and tries to encourage him, not only to join the resistance but to lead it. He also informs Tshembe that his father was part of the resistance before his death. Whether this is true or not, it has a profound effect on Tshembe. In the end Peter, dies at the hand of Major Rice and a firing squad. This is one of the turning points that leads to Tshembe joining the resistance.
- Ngago: A charismatic war leader first seen in the scene in which Peter confronts Tshembe. The sixth scene of act two is composed completely of Ngago’s monologue. This monologue serves two purposes: one is it is a war cry for the people narratively speaking, the other is to inform the reader (or audience member), that the escalation has reach a turning point. The monologue takes place immediately after the death of Peter.

=== Influential off-stage characters ===
- Old Abioseh: Newly deceased father of Abioseh and Tshembe, and husband of the deceased Aquah. He had always been a devoted friend of the Neilsen's compound, until he left and joined the resistance.
- Aquah (deceased): The best friend in Africa of the young Madame Neilsen, and wife of Old Abioseh, she had died giving birth to Eric.
- Amos Kumalo: Charismatic leader of the violent insurgency, who had traveled to England to negotiate. One of the turning points of the play is when he is arrested off-stage under the charge of “conspiracy” and killed whilst in police custody.
- Reverend Neilsen: The leader of the mission and the husband of Madame Neilsen. It is revealed towards the end of the play that he has been killed off stage by terrorists.
- Modingo (He Who Thinks Carefully Before He Acts): The main protagonist of a children’s fable told to Tshembe by Peter in an attempt to recruit him. In the fable, Modingo is a Hyena who is caught in a conflict between Hyenas and Elephants. Modingo decides to listen to both sides before he takes one. He was too slow to act and the Elephants forced the Hyenas out of their home as a result. This is why the Hyena has such a bitter laugh, being the butt of a joke played on them. Peter is drawing a comparison between Tshembe and Modingo.

== Sources ==
- Hansberry, Lorraine. Les Blancs: The Collected Last Plays. Random House, 1972.
- Barrios, Olga (June–December 1996). "The Intellectual Spear: Lorraine Hansberry's Les Blancs". Atlantis. 18 (1/2). AEDEAN: Asociación Española de Estudios Anglo-americanos: 28–36. JSTOR 41054811.
