= Sick Animals =

1970 Romanian film

- Directed by: Nicolae Breban
- Written by: Nicolae Breban
- Starring: Mircea Albulescu
- Cinematography: Aurel Kostrachievici
- Release date: 1970
- Country: Romania
- Language: Romanian

Sick Animals (Romanian: Printre colinele verzi) is a 1970 Romanian film directed by Nicolae Breban. It was entered into the 1971 Cannes Film Festival.

== Cast ==
- Mircea Albulescu
- Ion Dichiseanu
- Emilia Dobrin
- Dan Nutu
