= Monkeys in the Attic =

1974 Canadian film directed by Morley Markson

- Directed by: Morley Markson
- Written by: Morley Markson; John Palmer
- Produced by: Morley Markson
- Starring: Jackie Burroughs; Victor Garber; Louis Del Grande; Jess Walton; Jim Henshaw
- Cinematography: Henri Fiks
- Edited by: Eric Johannessen; Morley Markson
- Music by: John Wyer
- Production companies: Morley Markson and Associates
- Distributed by: Ambassador Film Distributors
- Release date: October 2, 1974
- Running time: 80 minutes
- Country: Canada
- Language: English

Monkeys in the Attic is a Canadian drama film, directed by Morley Markson and released in 1974. The film centres on the psychological and sexual games engaged in by two bohemian couples sharing a townhouse in Toronto, Ontario.

Wanda (Jackie Burroughs) and Eric (Victor Garber) are a couple who lead a wild sex life, while Elaine (Jess Walton) and Frederick (Louis Del Grande) have a troubled marriage on the verge of divorce. Into the mix comes Gus (Jim Henshaw), a pizza delivery man who gets drawn into the two couples' power games.

Martin Knelman of The Globe and Mail dismissed the film, writing that "Markson doesn't seem to think he has to give the audience any reason to care about these people or bother structuring his ideas. He assumes that there is some inherent fascination in a home movie about self-dramatizing exhibitionist freaks who are hip to drugs and old movies and contemporary furniture. He thinks a Lana Turner vehicle about a destroyed glamorpuss can work now if it's radicalized with a post avant-garde rehash of shtick from Warhol and Genet and renovated with a posh decorating job for the Age of Aquarius." A. Ibranyi-Kiss of Cinema Canada was more positive, writing that "The production value is extremely high, Henri Fiks' camerawork is magnificent, the acting is excellent. Over-all the 'craft' is beautiful."

The film was a Canadian Film Award nominee for Best Picture at the 26th Canadian Film Awards in 1975. It won the award for Best Foreign Film at the 1974 Rencontre internationale du jeune cinema in Toulon.
