= Long Distance Call =

- The Twilight Zone episode
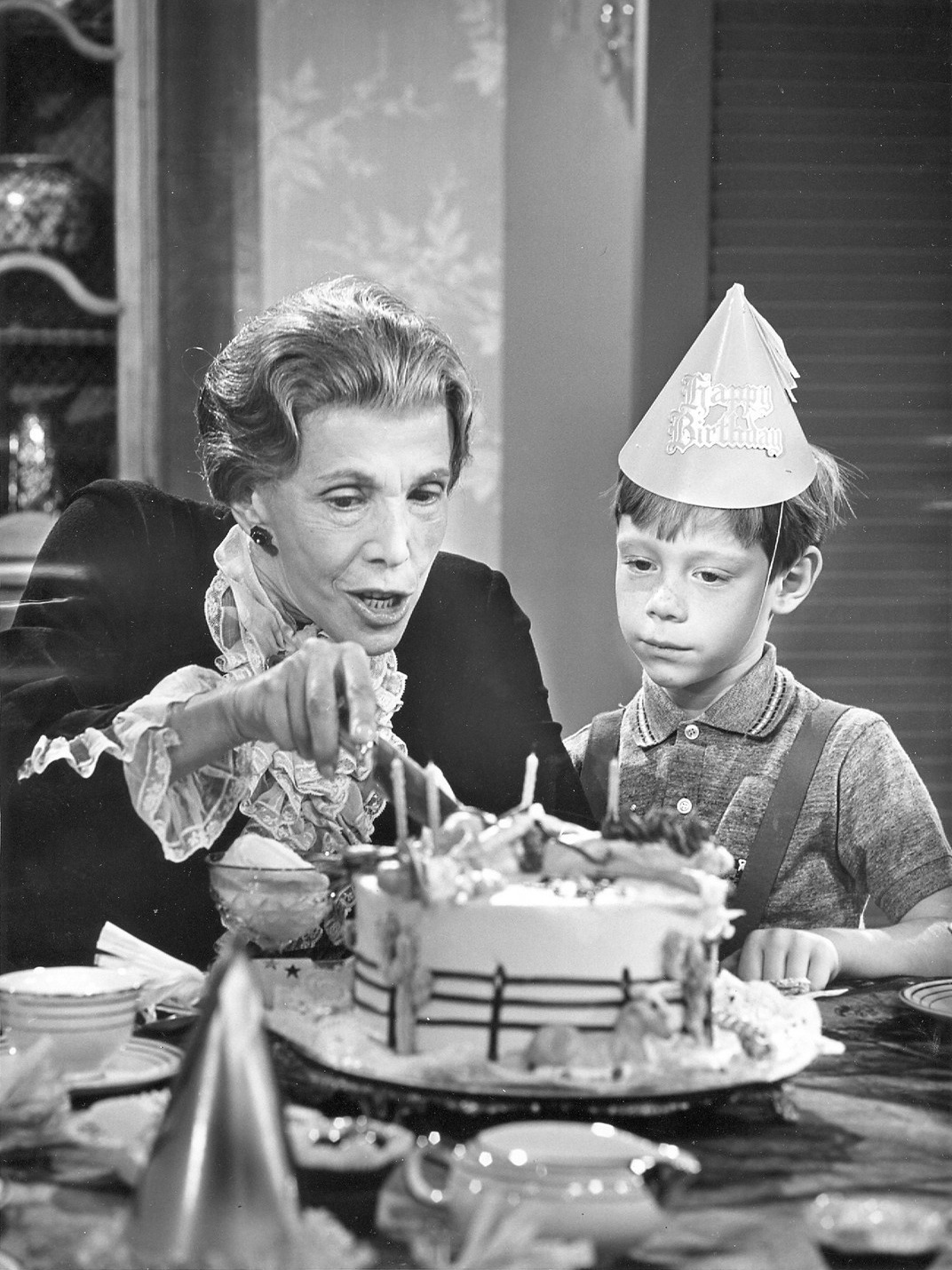
- Lili Darvas as Grandma Bayles and Billy Mumy as Billy Bayles.
- Episode no.: Season 2 Episode 22
- Directed by: James Sheldon
- Written by: Maxwell Sanford (uncredited); Charles Beaumont; William Idelson
- Production code: 173-3667
- Original air date: March 31, 1961

Guest appearances
- Philip Abbott as Chris Bayles; Lili Darvas as Grandma Bayles; Patricia Smith as Sylvia Bayles; Bill Mumy as Billy Bayles; Jenny Maxwell as Shirley; Reid Hammond as Mr. Peterson; Henry Hunter as Dr. Unger; Lew Brown as Fireman; Arch Johnson as Fireman; Jutta Parr as Nurse

Episode chronology
← Previous "The Prime Mover"	Next → "A Hundred Yards Over the Rim"
- The Twilight Zone (1959 TV series, season 2)

"Long Distance Call" is episode 58 of the American television anthology series The Twilight Zone. It originally aired on March 31, 1961, on CBS. In the episode, a 5-year-old boy named Billy communicates with his dead grandmother using a toy telephone that she gave him on his birthday. It was one of the six episodes of the second season which was shot on videotape in a short-lived experiment aimed to cut costs.

== Opening narration ==
The narration begins a few minutes into the episode:

As must be obvious, this is a house hovered over by Mr. Death, that omnipresent player to the third and final act of every life. And it's been said, and probably rightfully so, that what follows this life is one of the unfathomable mysteries, an area of darkness which we, the living, reserve for the dead—or so it is said. For in a moment, a child will try to cross that bridge which separates light and shadow. And, of course, he must take the only known route – that indistinct highway through the region we call the Twilight Zone.

== Plot ==
Billy's beloved grandmother visits for his fifth birthday party, despite being deathly frail. She gives the boy a toy telephone, telling him that he can always talk to her on it. She then becomes gravely weak and delusional, failing to recognize her son Chris and imagining that Billy is her son instead, before dying.

Billy's parents, especially his mother Sylvia, become concerned when he spends all his time on the toy telephone. He tells them he is talking to his grandmother, which they dismiss as his way of grieving. He says that she tells him she is lonely and misses him. While the parents are at her funeral, Billy runs out in front of a car. The driver, who barely manages to swerve out of the way, reports that Billy said someone told him to do it. When his father asks him why he did it, Billy says he does not know. Chris tries to explain that Grandma has died, and asks that he not use the toy phone in front of his mother. He discusses with Sylvia how his mother had two children before him, both of whom died, which is why she was so attached to him and especially Billy, who reminded her of Chris and helped her forget years of loss.

That night, Sylvia is awakened by the sound of Billy talking and laughing. Going to his room, she grabs the phone out of his hands, but is shocked when she hears Grandma on it and drops it, inadvertently breaking it in the process. Upset, Billy runs out of the room. Chris and Sylvia look for him only to find him face down in their garden pool.

An ambulance attendant informs the parents that Billy's chances are not good. Chris goes upstairs to Billy's room, picks up the toy phone, and begs his mother to give Billy back and allow him to experience life. He pleads that if she really loves him, she will let him live. Downstairs, the attendants' efforts to revive Billy succeed, and when Chris joins them, he and Sylvia embrace, relieved.

== Closing narration ==
A toy telephone, an act of faith, a set of improbable circumstances, all combine to probe a mystery, to fathom a depth, to send a facet of light into a dark after-region, to be believed or disbelieved, depending on your frame of reference. A fact or a fantasy, a substance or a shadow—but all of it very much a part of The Twilight Zone.

== Production ==
As The Twilight Zone's second season began, the production was informed by CBS that at about $65,000 per episode, the show was exceeding its budget. By November 1960, 16 episodes, more than half of the projected 29, were already filmed, and five of those had been broadcast. It was decided that six consecutive episodes (production code #173-3662 through #173-3667) would be videotaped at CBS Television City in the manner of a live drama and then transferred to 16-millimeter film for future syndicated TV transmissions. Eventual savings amounted to only about $30,000 for all six entries, which was judged to be insufficient to offset the loss of depth of visual perspective that only film could offer. The shows wound up looking little better than set-bound soap operas and as a result the experiment was deemed a failure and never tried again. "Long Distance Call" was the last of these six episodes to be aired.

The episode originated as a spec script by Maxwell Sanford entitled "Party Line" that was submitted to the producers via Sanford's friend, Richard Matheson (who in 1953 had written an unrelated short story titled "Long Distance Call," about a woman who receives mysterious telephone calls from a cemetery). Charles Beaumont offered to undertake revisions and ended up taking a joint credit on-screen with Bill Idelson instead. Sanford, (full name Maxwell Sanford Miller) was also an entertainment attorney and he successfully contested the credit through the Writers Guild. Thereafter the writing credit was changed on some prints in strip syndication to Maxwell Sanford. According to Martin Grams Jr in his book on the series, the episode was subject to at least two separate plagiarism claims regarding the authorship.

== See also ==
- List of The Twilight Zone (1959 TV series) episodes
