= Nino Quevedo =

Spanish writer

- Born: 1929
- Died: July 24, 2006 (aged 76–77); Madrid, Spain
- Occupations: Film director Screenwriter
- Years active: 1966-1985

Nino Quevedo (1929 – 24 July 2006) was a Spanish screenwriter and film director. He wrote for 17 films between 1966 and 1985.

== Filmography ==
- Futuro imperfecto (1985)
- Vivir mañana (1983)
- Como la uña de la carne (1978)
- Suave, cariño, muy suave (1978)
- Silos, siglos (1977)
- Canción de la trilla (1975)
- Castilla eterna (1975)
- Oh tierra triste y noble (1975)
- Goya, a Story of Solitude (1971)
- Crónica en negro y oro (1970)
- Caminos de Castilla (1968)
- Encuentro con Tolaitola. Toledo árabe (1968)
- Fiesta de nieve en Castilla (1968)
- Fiesta en el Sella (1968)
- Voz y silencio del Sella (1968)
- La busca (1966)
