= Nicolae Breban =

Romanian writer

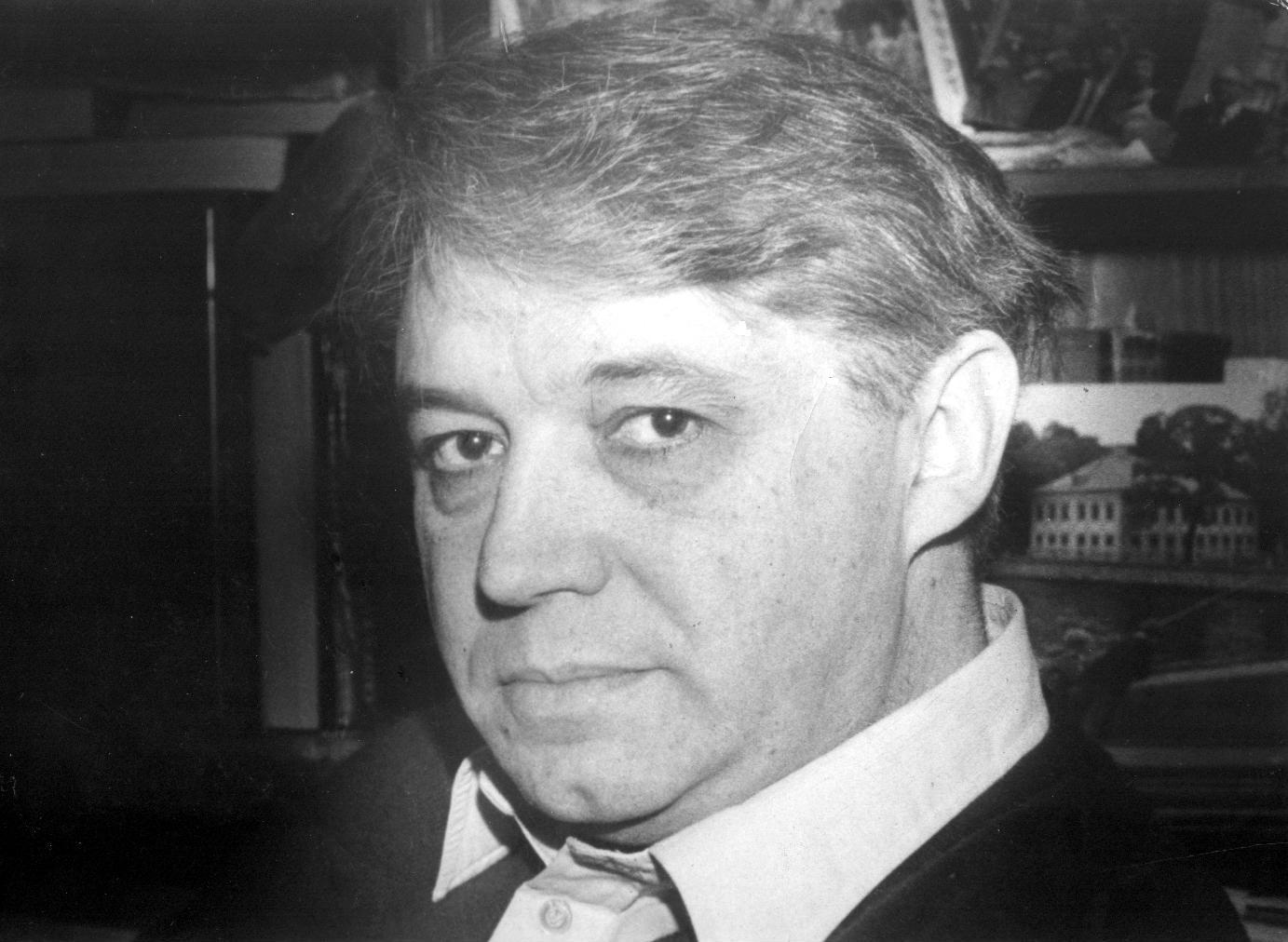
- Born: 1 February 1934 (age 92); Baia Mare
- Occupations: novelist, essayist
- Writing career
- Period: 1957–present
- Genre: Romanian literature

Nicolae Breban (Romanian pronunciation: [nikoˈla.e breˈban]; born 1 February 1934) is a Romanian novelist and essayist of partial German descent.

== Biography ==
Breban was born in Baia Mare, Maramureș County, Transylvania, Socialist Republic of Romania, the son of Vasile Breban, a Greek Catholic priest in the village of Recea. His mother, Olga Constanţa Esthera Breban, born Böhmler, descended from a family of German merchants who emigrated from Alsace-Lorraine. In 1951, he was expelled from school on account of his social origin when in the penultimate year at the „Coriolan Brediceanu” High School in Lugoj. He worked as an office clerk in Oradea, and finally passed the graduation exams at the „Oltea Doamna” High School. As he intended to study at the Polytechnical Institute, he had to work first as an apprentice at the "23 August” Works in Bucharest. He enrolled in the Faculty of Philosophy by „forging personal documents” as he candidly admitted in Confesiuni violente ("Violent Confessions"). His reading of Nietzsche and Schopenhauer made him, in fact, suspicious in the eyes of Dean Athanase Joja. He made his literary debut in „Viaţa studenţească” (no. 5, May 1957), with the sketch Doamna din vis ("The Lady in the Dream").

At the 10th Congress of the Romanian Communist Party, held between 6 and 12 August 1969, Breban was elected a substitute member of the Central Committee. Beginning with issue no. 20 of 14 May 1970, he was editor-in-chief of the literary review România literară, around which he attracted some of Romania's most important writers. In 1971, the première of the movie Printre colinele verzi/Among the Green Hills (written and directed by Nicolae Breban), the film version of Sick Animals, took place. The communist authorities were quite annoyed by this movie, but it was nevertheless included in the official selection for the International Festival of Cannes. While in Paris, Nicolae Breban remained shocked by the so-called "July Theses”, by means of which Nicolae Ceauşescu, following the Maoist model, was trying to start some kind of Cultural Revolution. The writer publicly repudiated the cultural policy of the Romanian regime in a number of interviews published in the Western media, and, in protest, resigned his position as editor-in-chief of "România literară”. Back home, in 1972, the communist authorities regarded him as an outcast. He was therefore marginalized, watched by the police, and not allowed to travel abroad again until 1975, despite having also acquired German citizenship that year. Without actually becoming an exile, he lived mostly in Paris with his wife, Cristina, between 1986 and 1989. He returned to Romania, and in 1990 launched a new series of the literary review "Contemporanul. Ideea europeană". On 24 October 1997, he became a corresponding member of the Romanian Academy, and on 14 January 2009, a full member.

== Published works ==
=== Novels ===
- Francisca, 1965
- În absenţa stăpânilor (When the Masters are Away), 1966
- Animale bolnave (Sick Animals), 1968
- Îngerul de gips (The Plaster Angel), 1973
- Bunavestire (The Annunciation), 1977
- Don Juan, 1981
- Drumul la zid (The Back to the Wall), 1984
- Pândă şi seducţie (Still hunt and Seduction), 1991
- Amfitrion (Amphitryon), vol. I, Demonii mărunţi/The Lesser Demons, vol. II, Procuratorii/The Procurators, vol. III, Alberta, 1994
- Ziua şi noaptea (The Day and the Night), 1998
- Voinţa de putere (The Will to Power), 2001
- Puterea nevăzută (The Unseen Power), 2004
- Jiquidi, 2007
- Singura cale (The Only Path), 2011

=== Novels translated in other languages ===
- Franciska, translated by Huszár Sándor, Bucharest, Irodalom Könyvkiádó, 1968
- Franciska, translated by Ivan Krstev Vlah, Sofia, Profizdet, 1968
- Franciska, translated by Jurij Koževnikov, Moscow, Progress, 1969
- Franciska, translated by Juozas Vaisnoras, Vilnius, Vaga, 1970
- Franciska, translated by Janis Bunduls, Riga, Liesma, 1971
- Kranke Tiere (Sick Animals), translated by Georg Scherg, Bucharest, Kriterion, 1973
- When the Masters are Away (Ebbi en Kvinna med karaktär), translated by Barbro Andersson into Swedish, René Coeckelberghs' Publishing House, 1975
- When the Masters are Away (En l'absence des maîtres), translated by Virgil Tănase into French, Paris, Publishing House Flammarion, 1983
- Annunciation (L'Annonciation), translated by Dorina Radu and Marcel Péju, Paris, Publishing House Flammarion, 1985
- Don Juan, translated by Marcel Péju and Daniel Pujol, Paris, Publishing House Flammarion, 1993
- When the Masters are Away (In assenza dei padroni), translated by Maria Floarea Pop, Siena, Edizioni Cantagalli, 2013

=== Short stories ===
- Orfeu în infern (Orpheus in the Underwold), 2008

=== Essays, diaries ===
- Confesiuni violente (Violent Confessions), 1994
- Riscul în cultură (Taking Chances in Culture), 1997
- Spiritul românesc în faţa unei dictaturi (The Romanian Spirit Facing Dictatorship), 1997
- Stricte amintiri literare (Rigorous Literary Memoirs), 2001
- Sensul vieţii (Memorii I-IV) (The Meaning of Life), 2003–2007
- Friedrich Nietzsche, Maxime comentate (Commented Morals), 2004
- Vinovaţi fără vină (Innocent Culprits), 2006

=== Plays ===
- Bătrâna doamnă şi fluturele (The Old Lady and the Butterfly), 1984
- Culoarul cu şoareci (A Corridor Ridden with Mice), 1990 (the première of the play is performed at „Vasile Alecsandri” National Theater in Iaşi in 1993)
- Ursul şi ştiuca (The Bear and the Pike), 2000

=== Poems ===
- Elegii parisiene (Parisian Elegies), 1992
- Gesänge, 2021 - Übersetzt von Christian W. Schenk, mit Kupferstichen von den Erste deutschen Künstlern, XVI-XVIII, Dionysos Verlag, Boppard am Rhein Germany, Erste deutsche Ausgabe, ISBN 9798574797365

=== Translation ===
- Rainer Maria Rilke, Duino Elegies, 2006; 2008

=== Filmography ===
(as screenplay writer)

- Răutăciosul adolescent (A Woman for a Season) (directed by: Gheorghe Vitanidis), 1969

(as screenplay writer and director)

- Printre colinele verzi (Among the Green Hills, the film version of Sick Animals), 1971

== Awards ==
- The „Ion Creangă” Award of the Romanian Academy (1965)
- The Romanian Writers' Union Award (1968)
- The Romanian Writers' Union Award (1994)
- The Romanian Writers' Union Award „Opera Omnia” (2000)
