= Lili Darvas =

Hungarian actress (1902-1974)

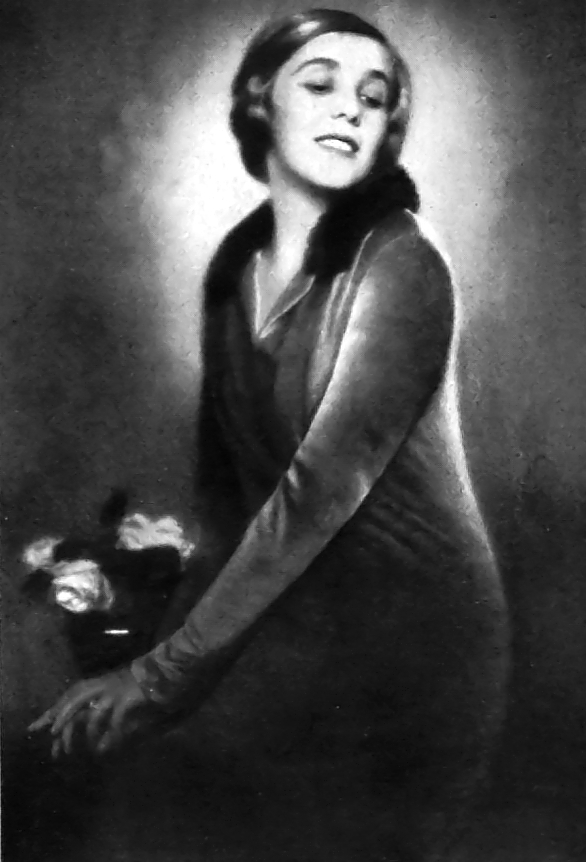
- Darvas, c. 1926
- Born: Lili Sára Darvas; April 10, 1902; Budapest, Austria-Hungary
- Died: July 22, 1974 (aged 72); New York City, New York, U.S.
- Occupation: Actress
- Years active: 1926–1974
- Spouse: Franz Molnar (m. 1925; died 1952)

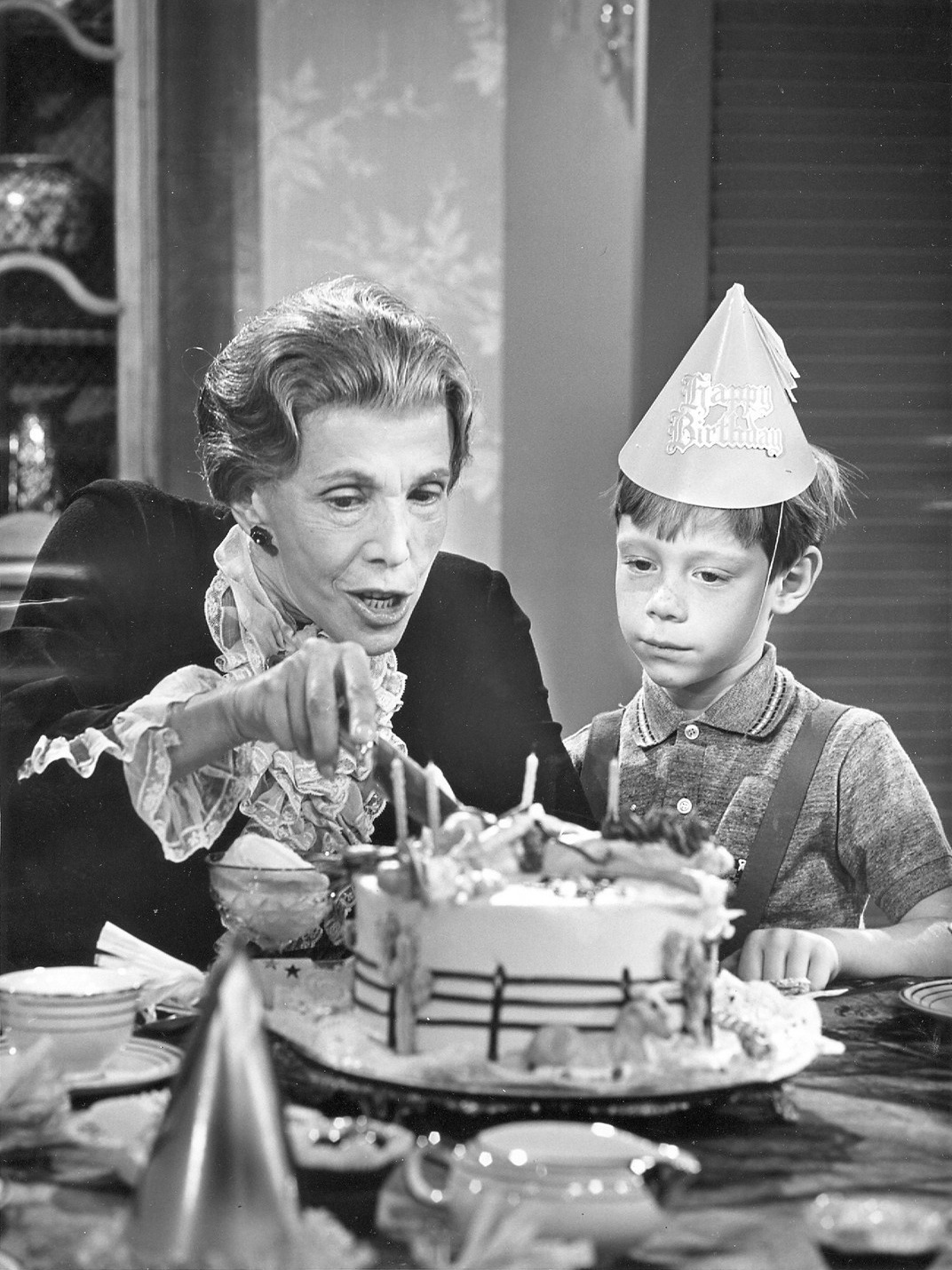
With Billy Mumy in episode of The Twilight Zone, "Long Distance Call" (1961)

Lili Sára Darvas, also known as Lili Darvas (April 10, 1902 – July 22, 1974) was a Hungarian actress known for her stage performances throughout Europe and the United States, as well as her later appearances in films and television.

She was nominated for the Tony Award for Best Featured Actress in a Play in 1971 for her performance in Les Blancs. She received critical acclaim for her performance in the 1971 film Love, for which she was given a special award at the Cannes Film Festival and a runner-up mention by the National Society of Film Critics. Her additional film appearances include Meet Me in Las Vegas (1956) and the 1960 remake of Cimarron.

== Life and career ==
Darvas was born in Budapest in 1902, the daughter of Berta (née Freiberger) and Sándor Darvas. She studied at the Budapest Lyceum, and had her professional acting debut when she was 20.

In 1925, she married the playwright Ferenc Molnar and became a member of Max Reinhardt's theater group, learning German and joining the Theater in der Josefstadt, from 1925 until the Anschluss in 1938, when they were forced to flee. Her peers during this time included Luise Rainer and Lotte Lenya. She was the first "Olympic" as the daughter "Vivie" in George Bernard Shaw's Mrs. Warren's Profession or Genia Hofreiter in Arthur Schnitzler's The Vast Domain. Her husband accompanied her on her tours to Berlin, Vienna and Salzburg. In 1926 she played in Molnar's Játék a kastélyban and Riviera. The former piece was performed on all the major European stages in the same year performed on Broadway. In 1927 she played Titania in Reinhardt's production of A Midsummer Night's Dream.

In New York theater directors and publishers bombarded the couple with offers and invitations. They were even received by President Calvin Coolidge at the White House, and Molnár's 50th birthday was celebrated lavishly.

Darvas received American citizenship in 1944. Because of the subsequent long periods of separation and Darvas' travelling, the couple separated amicably, but remained married and friends until Molnár's death in 1952.

Darvas appeared in the Goodyear Television Playhouse episode "My Lost Saints" in 1955. She played Grandma Bayles in The Twilight Zone episode "Long Distance Call" (Season 2 - Episode 22) in 1961. In 1970 she was in Károly Makk's Hungarian film Love (Szerelem).
